= Sogn og Fjordane =

County of Norway (1919–2019)

Sogn og Fjordane County Sogn og Fjordane fylke
- Former County
- Nordre Bergenhus amt (historic name)
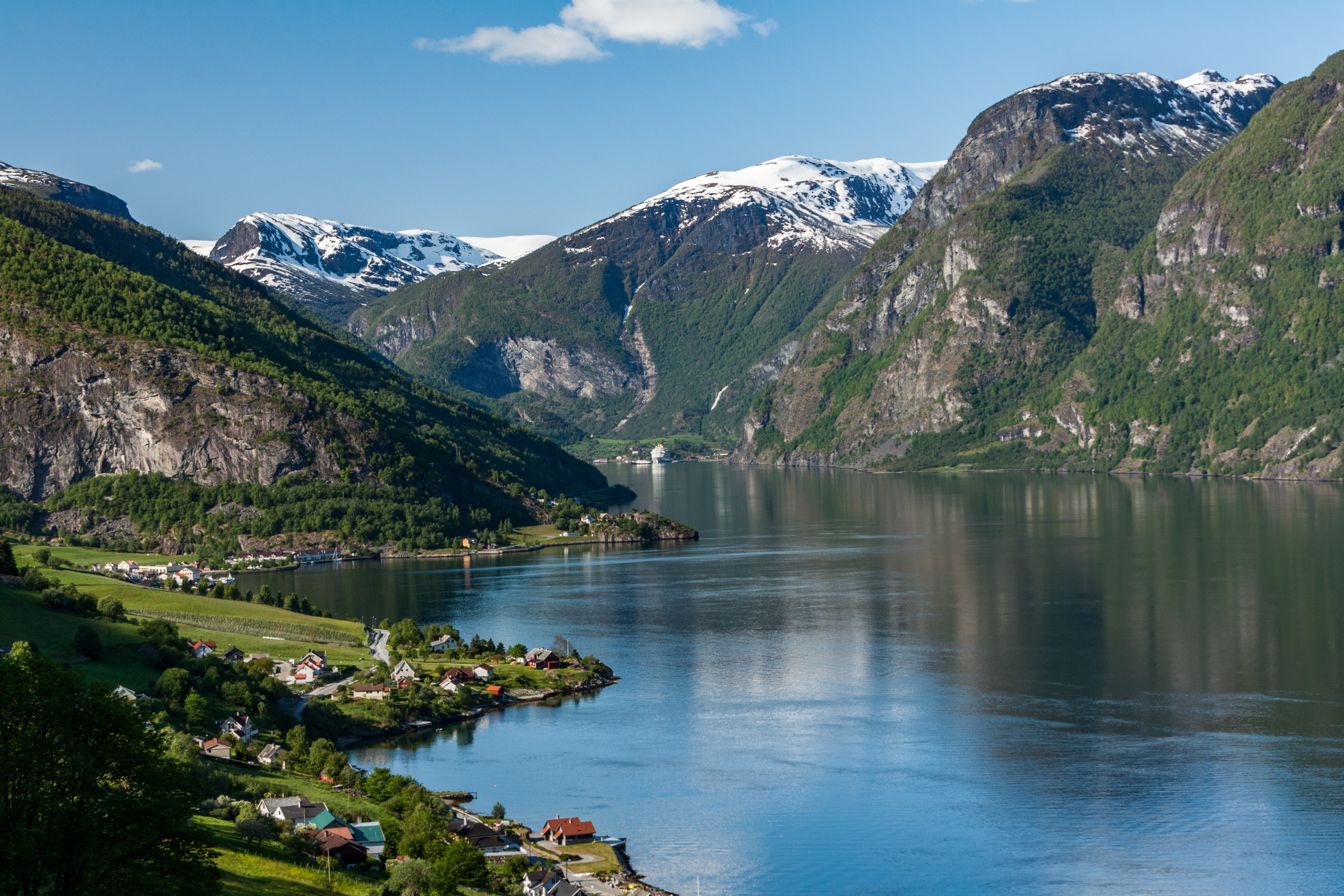
- Aurlandsfjord

- Flag Coat of arms

- Location within Sogn og Fjordane Location within Norway
- Coordinates: 61°20′N 05°50′E
- Country: Norway
- County: Sogn og Fjordane
- District: Western Norway
- Established: 1763
  - Preceded by: Bergenhus amt
- Disestablished: 1 Jan 2020
  - Succeeded by: Vestland county
- Administrative centre: Hermansverk

Government
  - Body: Sogn og Fjordane County Municipality
  - Governor (2019): Lars Sponheim
  - County mayor (2015-2019): Jenny Følling (Sp)

Area (upon dissolution)
  - Total: 18,623 km^{2} (7,190 sq mi)
  - Land: 17,709 km^{2} (6,837 sq mi)
  - Water: 914 km^{2} (353 sq mi) 4.9%
  - Rank: #8 in Norway

Population (2018)
  - Total: 110,230
  - Rank: #18 in Norway
  - Density: 6.2245/km^{2} (16.121/sq mi)
  - Change (10 years): ▲ +3.74%
- Demonym(s): Sogning and Fjording

Official language
  - Norwegian form: Nynorsk
- Time zone: UTC+01:00 (CET)
  - Summer (DST): UTC+02:00 (CEST)
- ISO 3166 code: NO-14
- Income (per capita): 134,400 kr (2001)
- GDP (per capita): 231,982 kr (2001)
- GDP national rank: #16 in Norway (1.63% of country)

Sogn og Fjordane (Urban East Norwegian: [ˈsɔŋn ɔ ˈfjûːrɑnə]; literally "Parish and the Fjords") was a county in western Norway, from 1 January 1919 to 31 December 2019, after it was merged to become part of Vestland county. It was surrounded by Møre og Romsdal, Oppland, Buskerud, and Hordaland counties. The county administration was in the village of Hermansverk in Leikanger Municipality. The largest town in the county was Førde.

Although Sogn og Fjordane has some industry, predominantly hydroelectricity and aluminium, it is predominantly an agricultural area. Sogn og Fjordane is also home to the Urnes Stave Church and the Nærøyfjord, which are both listed by UNESCO as World Heritage Sites.

The Western Norway University of Applied Sciences has campuses in Sogndalsfjøra and Førde.

== Name ==
The name Sogn og Fjordane was created in 1919; a literal translation is: Sogn and the fjords. The first element is the name of the region of Sogn, located in the southern part of the county. The last element is the plural definite form of fjord, which refers to the two regions in the county called Nordfjord and Sunnfjord in the northern and central parts of the county.

Prior to 1919, the name of the county was Nordre Bergenhus amt which meant "(the) northern (part of) Bergenhus amt". (The old Bergenhus amt, created in 1662, was divided into northern and southern halves in 1763.)

== Coat of arms ==
The coat of arms of Sogn og Fjordane was granted on 23 September 1983. The arms show the geographical layout of the county: three large blue fjords protruding into the white colored land. The three fjords represent the three regions of the county: Nordfjord (surrounding Nordfjorden), Sunnfjord (with Førdefjorden), and Sogn (surrounding Sognefjorden). Nearly all villages and towns are situated along one of these fjords and the name of the county is based on the fjords.

== Written standard ==
Sogn og Fjordane is the only county in Norway in which all municipalities have declared Nynorsk to be their official written form of the Norwegian language.

== History ==
Historical population
Year	Pop.	±%
1951	97,714	—
1961	99,957	+2.3%
1971	100,933	+1.0%
1981	105,924	+4.9%
1991	106,614	+0.7%
2001	107,590	+0.9%
2011	107,742	+0.1%
Source: Statistics Norway

The county consisted of the two historic counties: Firdafylke (now the Fjordane region; Nordfjord-Sunnfjord) and Sygnafylke (now the Sogn region). These both were formed in the Middle Ages under the Gulating government. They were merged with Hordafylke (now Hordaland) and Sunnmørafylke (now Sunnmøre) to form the Bergenhus len in the late Middle Ages. The Bergenhus len was one of four len in Norway. It was administered from the Bergenhus Fortress in the city of Bergen.

On 19 February 1662, a royal decree changed the name to Bergenhus amt. The Sunnmøre region was moved to Romsdalen amt in 1689. Later, in 1763, the amt was divided in half creating: Nordre Bergenhus and Søndre Bergenhus (Northern and Southern Bergenhus). Later, on 1 January 1919, Nordre Bergenhus amt was renamed Sogn og Fjordane fylke during a period of time when many location names in Norway were changed. In 2017, the Norwegian government announced the merger of this county as well as Hordaland into a new county called Vestland.

== Government ==
A county (fylke) is the chief local administrative area in Norway. The country is divided into 19 counties. A county is also an election area, with popular votes taking place every 4 years. The Sogn og Fjordane County Municipality was the government that oversaw the county. It was a group of 39 members who were elected to form a county council (Fylkesting). Heading the Fylkesting was the county mayor (fylkesordførar). The last county mayor for the Sogn og Fjordane County Municipality was Åshild Kjelsnes, the county mayor. She replaced Nils R. Sandal, who was county mayor from 2003 until 2011.

The county also had a County Governor (fylkesmann) who was the representative of the King and Government of Norway. Anne Karin Hamre was the last County Governor of Sogn og Fjordane. She replaced Oddvar Flæte, who was county governor from 1994 until 2011.

The municipalities of Sogn og Fjordane were divided among three district courts (tingrett): Sogn, Fjordane, and Nordhordland. Sogn og Fjordane was also part of the Gulating Court of Appeal district based in Bergen.

- Sogn District Court: Aurland, Balestrand, Leikanger, Luster, Lærdal, Sogndal, Vik, and Årdal
- Fjordane District Court: Askvoll, Bremanger, Eid, Fjaler, Flora, Førde, Gaular, Gloppen, Hornindal, Hyllestad, Høyanger, Jølster, Naustdal, Selje, Solund, Stryn, and Vågsøy
- Nordhordland District Court: Gulen (and the rest of the Nordhordland district of the county of Hordaland)

All of the municipalities of Sogn og Fjordane except Gulen and Solund were part of the Sogn og Fjordane police district. Gulen and Solund were part of the Hordaland police district.

== Geography ==
It is mainly a rural area with a scattered population. Sogn og Fjordane includes the largest glacier in mainland Norway, Jostedalsbreen, in the Breheimen mountain range, and the deepest lake, Hornindalsvatnet. There are also many famous waterfalls located in the area. Ramnefjellsfossen (previously called Utigardfossen) is the tallest in Norway and third tallest in the world and Vettisfossen is one of Norway's highest waterfalls with a vertical drop of 275 metres (902 ft). Both are located in the Jotunheim mountains. Cruise ships visit Sogn og Fjordane all summer because of the unique vistas of high mountains and deep blue fjords.

The famous Nærøyfjord is located in the south of the county. This is a UNESCO listed fjord area. There are several archipelagos, including Bulandet, Bremangerlandet and islands around Florø. The westernmost point in Norway proper is Holmebåen in Solund municipality. The island of Unst, part of Shetland Islands is around 300 kilometres (190 mi) west of Holmebåen.

The terrain changes quite rapidly with mostly smaller mountains on the coastline, gradually increasing to mountains reaching more than 2,000 metres (6,600 ft). Because of the steep rise in elevation and fjords cutting through the terrain, the amount of precipitation is very high. Low pressure systems come in from the west and meet the mountains (a phenomenon known as orographic lifting) and cause rain and snowfall.

== Transport ==
Transport is made more difficult because of the fjords and the mountains. The fjords have to be crossed by ferries or rounded, often a large detour. There are four airports in the county, at Florø, Førde, Sandane and Sogndal. There is only one railway station, Flåm. The county contracts bus and boat companies for bus and boat routes in the county, under the new (2015) brand name Kringom.

== Districts ==
The county is conventionally divided into three traditional districts. These are Sogn (in the south), Sunnfjord (in the centre), and Nordfjord (in the north). Sogn surrounds Sognefjorden from Solund Municipality on the offshore island of Sula in the North Sea to the village of Skjolden in Luster Municipality along Lustrafjorden, a branch of the Sognefjord. The total length is 204 kilometres (127 mi). The middle district of Sunnfjord actually has two main fjords: Førdefjorden and Dalsfjorden. The northern district surrounds the Nordfjord.

== Municipalities ==
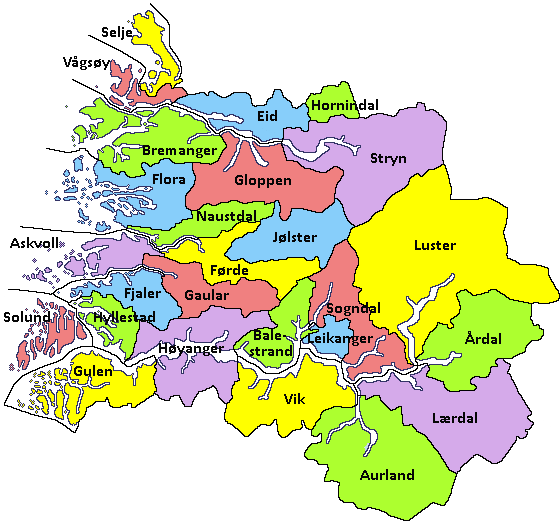
Map of the former municipalities in Sogn og Fjordane county (2014)

In 1837, the counties were divided into local administrative units, each with their own governments. The number and borders of these municipalities have changed over time, and before the dissolution of the county, there were 26 municipalities in Sogn og Fjordane. Originally the municipalities were the same as the old Church of Norway parishes.

1. Askvoll Municipality
2. Aurland Municipality
3. Årdal Municipality
4. Balestrand Municipality
5. Bremanger Municipality
6. Eid Municipality
7. Fjaler Municipality
8. Flora Municipality
9. Førde Municipality
10. Gaular Municipality
11. Gloppen Municipality
12. Gulen Municipality
13. Hornindal Municipality
14. Hyllestad Municipality
15. Høyanger Municipality
16. Jølster Municipality
17. Leikanger Municipality
18. Luster Municipality
19. Lærdal Municipality
20. Naustdal Municipality
21. Selje Municipality
22. Sogndal Municipality
23. Solund Municipality
24. Stryn Municipality
25. Vik Municipality
26. Vågsøy Municipality

== Cities ==
- Florø
- Førde
- Måløy

== Parishes ==
- Arnafjord
- Askrova
- Askvoll
- Aurland
- Bakka
- Balestrand (Tjugum)
- Batalden
- Berle
- Bjordal
- Borgund
- Old Borgund
- Breim
- Brekke
- Bremanger
- Bremangerpollen
- Bru (Svanø)
- Bygstad (Svanø)
- Bulandet
- Bø
- Dale i Fjaler
- Dale i Luster
- Davik
- Eid
- Eikefjord
- Ervik
- Farnes
- Feios (Rinde)
- Fet
- Fjaler (Ytre Holmedal)
- Fjærland (Mundal)
- Florø
- Flåm
- Folkestad
- Fortun
- Fresvik
- Frøya
- Førde
- Gaular
- Old Gaupne
- Gaupne
- Gimmestad
- Old Gimmestad
- Gjemmestad
- Gloppen
- Guddal
- Gulen (Evindvik)
- Hafslo
- Hauge
- Heggjabygda
- Helgheim
- Haukedalen
- Hellevik
- Hersvik
- Hestad
- Holmedal
- Holsen
- Hopperstad
- Hornindal
- Hove
- Husøy (Husø)
- Hyen
- Hyllestad
- Høyanger
- Indre Holmedal, see Gaular
- Innvik
- Joranger
- Jostedal
- Jølster
- Kaupanger
- Kinn (Kinden)
- Kirkebø, see Kyrkjebø
- Kjølsdalen
- Kvamsøy
- Kyrkjebø
- Lavik
- Leikanger
- Leikanger (Leganger) i Selje
- Ljosheim
- Loen
- Luster (Lyster)
- Lærdal
- Midtgulen
- Mjømna (Mjømen)
- Mundal (Fjæreland)
- Naustdal (Nøssedal)
- Nedstryn
- Nes
- Nordal
- Norddalsfjord
- Nord-Vågsøy
- Nordsida
- Norum
- Olden
- Old Olden
- Oppstryn
- Ortnevik
- Randabygd
- Rinde
- Rugsund
- Sandane
- Sande
- Selje
- Sogndal
- Solund (Sulen)
- Solvorn
- Stavang
- Stedje
- Stongfjorden
- Stryn (Innvik)
- Stårheim
- Sulen, see Solund
- Svanøy
- Svelgen
- Sæle
- Sør-VågsøySør-Vågsøy
- Tjugum (Balestrand)
- Totland
- Tønjum
- Undredal
- Urnes
- Utvik
- Vangen
- Vangsnes
- Vassenden
- Veitastrond
- Vereid
- Vereide
- Vevring (Vefring)
- Vik
- Vik (Hopperstad, Hove)
- Viksdalen
- Vilnes
- Værlandet
- Ytre Holmedal, see Fjaler
- Ølmheim
- Øn
- Ålfoten
- Ålhus
- Årdal

== Villages ==
- Arnafjord
- Askvoll
- Aurlandsvangen
- Austreim
- Bakka
- Balestrand
- Barekstadlandet
- Barmen
- Barmøya
- Berle
- Bjordal
- Borgund
- Brandsøy
- Brekke
- Bremanger
- Bruland
- Brulandet
- Bryggja
- Bygstad
- Byrkjelo
- Byrknes
- Dale
- Dalsøyra
- Davik
- Degnepoll
- Deknepollen
- Dingja
- Eikefjord
- Eimhjellen
- Eivindvik
- Egge
- Ervik
- Espedal
- Feios
- Fimreite
- Fjærland
- Flatraket
- Flekke
- Flo
- Flåm
- Fortun
- Fresvik
- Frønningen
- Gaupne
- Gimmestad
- Grodås
- Grov
- Guddal
- Gudvangen
- Hafslo
- Hardbakke
- Haukedalen
- Heggjabygda
- Helgheim
- Helle
- Hermansverk
- Hersvikbygda
- Hestad
- Holvik
- Holmedal
- Holsen
- Hopland
- Hovden
- Hyen
- Hyllestad
- Håvik
- Høyanger
- Indre Offerdal
- Indrevevring
- Innvik
- Instefjord
- Isane
- Jostedal
- Kalvåg
- Kandal
- Kaupanger
- Kjølsdalen
- Kjørnes
- Kolgrov
- Kvalheim
- Kvammen
- Kvamsøy
- Kyrkjebø
- Langenes
- Langhaugane
- Lavik
- Leikanger
- Leikanger
- Leirvik
- Loen
- Losnegard
- Lote
- Luster
- Lærdalsøyri
- Midtgulen
- Mjømna
- Mogrenda
- Myrdal
- Naustdal
- Nedstryn
- Nes
- Nese
- Norane
- Norddalsfjord
- Nordfjordeid
- Nornes
- Nordsida
- Nyttingnes
- Olden
- Oppstryn
- Ornes
- Ortnevik
- Randabygda
- Raudeberg
- Re
- Reed
- Refvik
- Rognaldsvåg
- Roset
- Rugsund
- Rutledal
- Rygg
- Sandane
- Sande
- Seimsdalen
- Selje
- Silda
- Skei
- Skjolden
- Skorpa
- Sogndalsfjøra
- Solvorn
- Stavang
- Steinhovden
- Stongfjorden
- Straume
- Stryn
- Stårheim
- Svanøya
- Svelgen
- Sørbøvågen
- Sørstranda
- Systrond
- Tennebø
- Totland
- Tjugum
- Tønjum
- Undredal
- Urnes
- Utvik
- Vadheim
- Vangsnes
- Vassenden
- Vedvik
- Veitastrond
- Vereide
- Vik
- Vikøyri
- Vågsvåg
- Ytre Oppedal
- Øvre Årdal
- Ålfoten
- Ålhus
- Årdalstangen

== Former Municipalities ==
- Borgund Municipality
- Breim Municipality
- Brekke Municipality
- Bru Municipality
- Davik Municipality
- Eikefjord Municipality
- Florø Municipality
- Hafslo Municipality
- Innvik Municipality
- Jostedal Municipality
- Kinn Municipality
- Kyrkjebø Municipality
- Lavik Municipality
- Lavik og Brekke Municipality
- Nord-Vågsøy Municipality
- Sør-Vågsøy Municipality
- Vevring Municipality

== Gallery ==
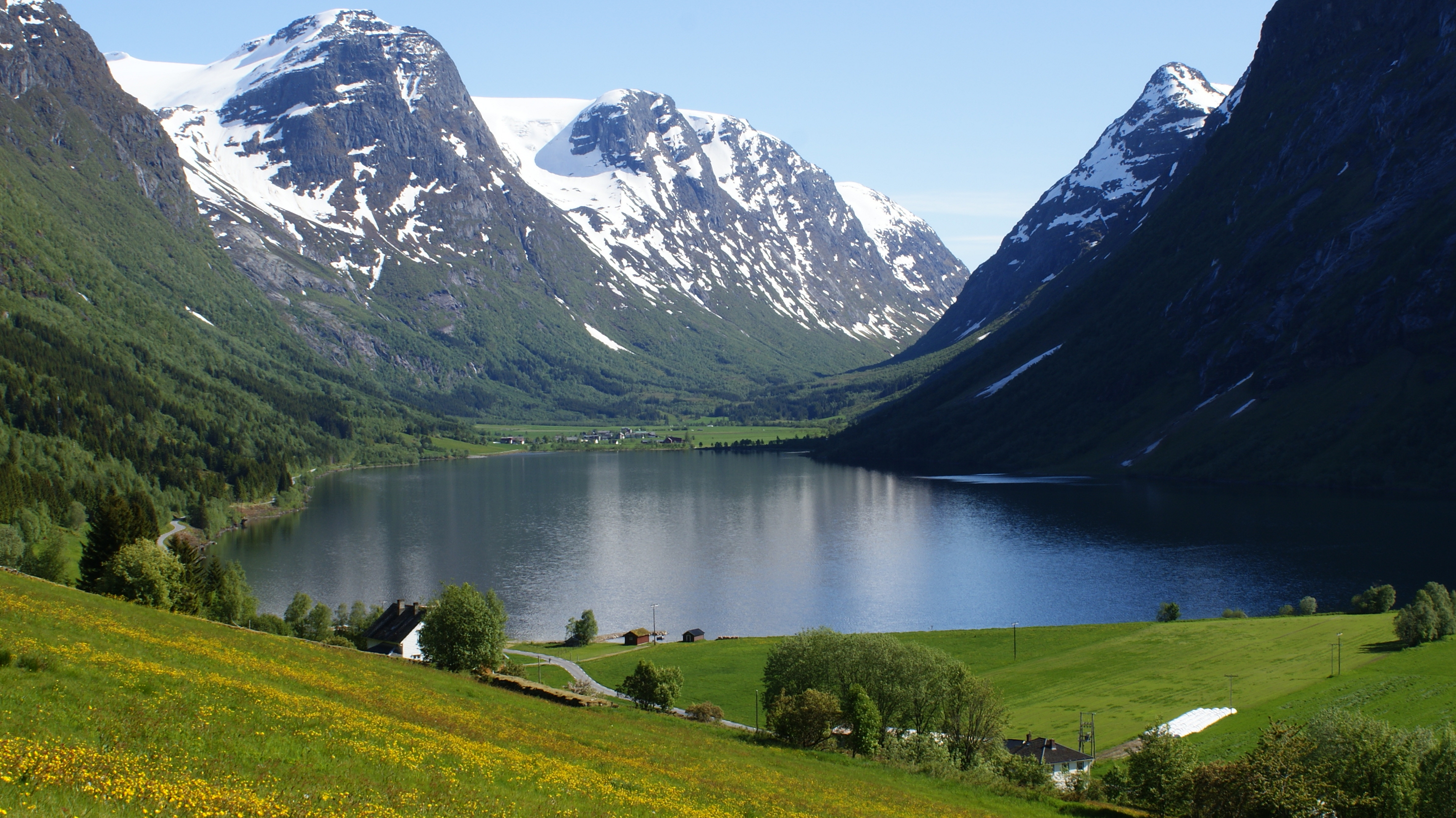
Myklebustdalen valley east of Byrkjelo

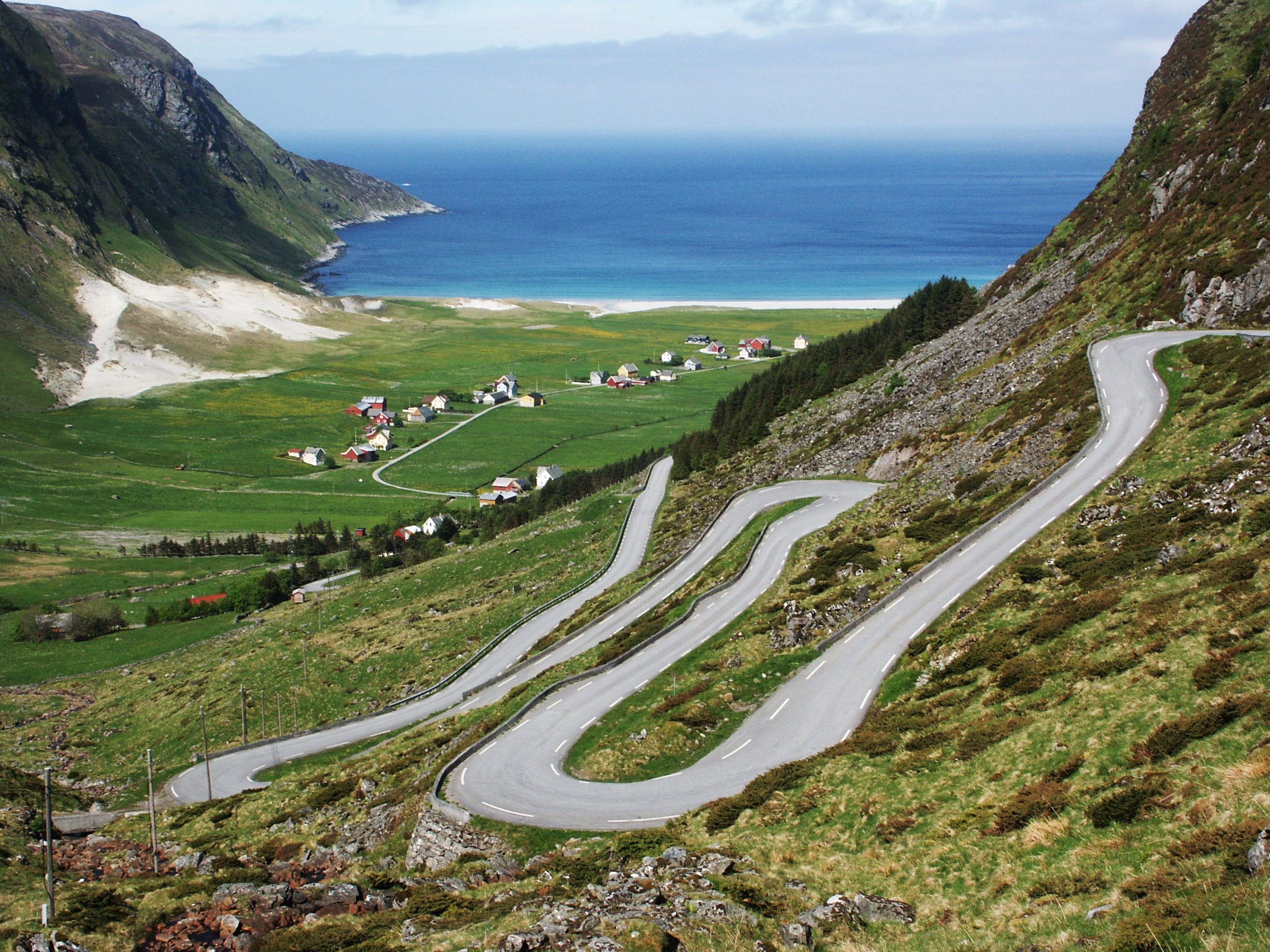
The village of Hoddevik on the Stad peninsula in Selje Municipality

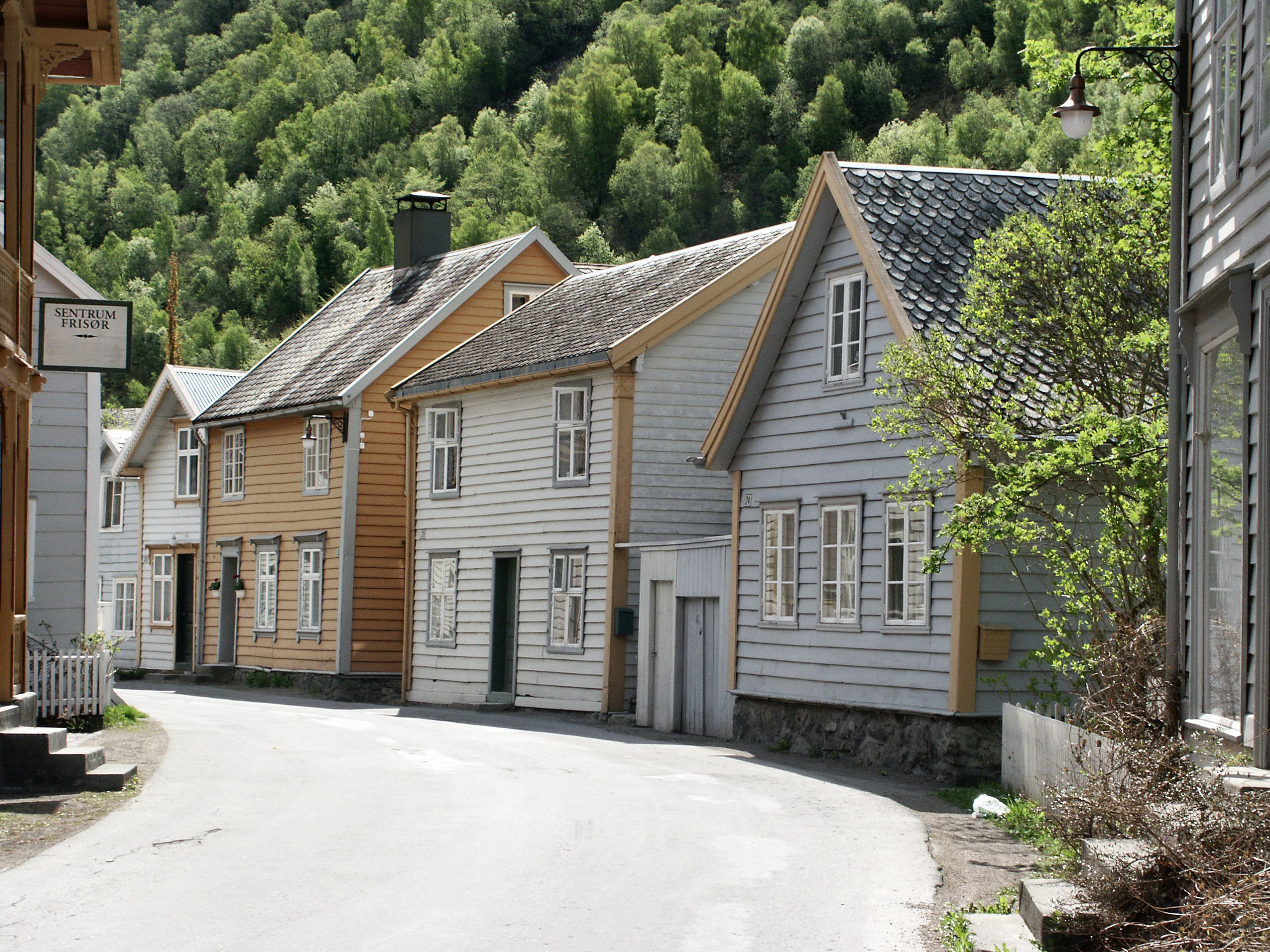
Some old houses in Lærdalsøyri in Lærdal Municipality

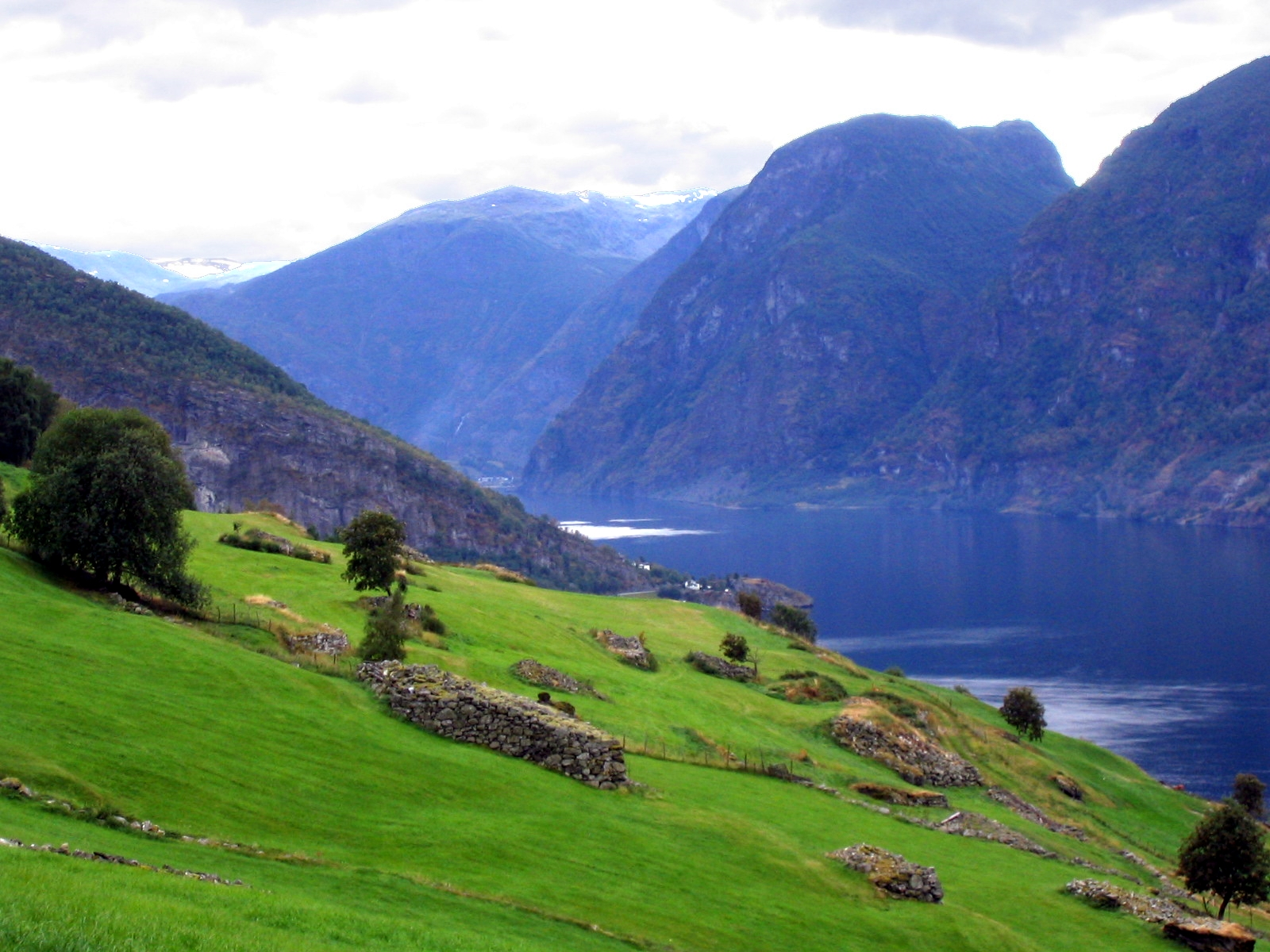
View from Aurland Municipality

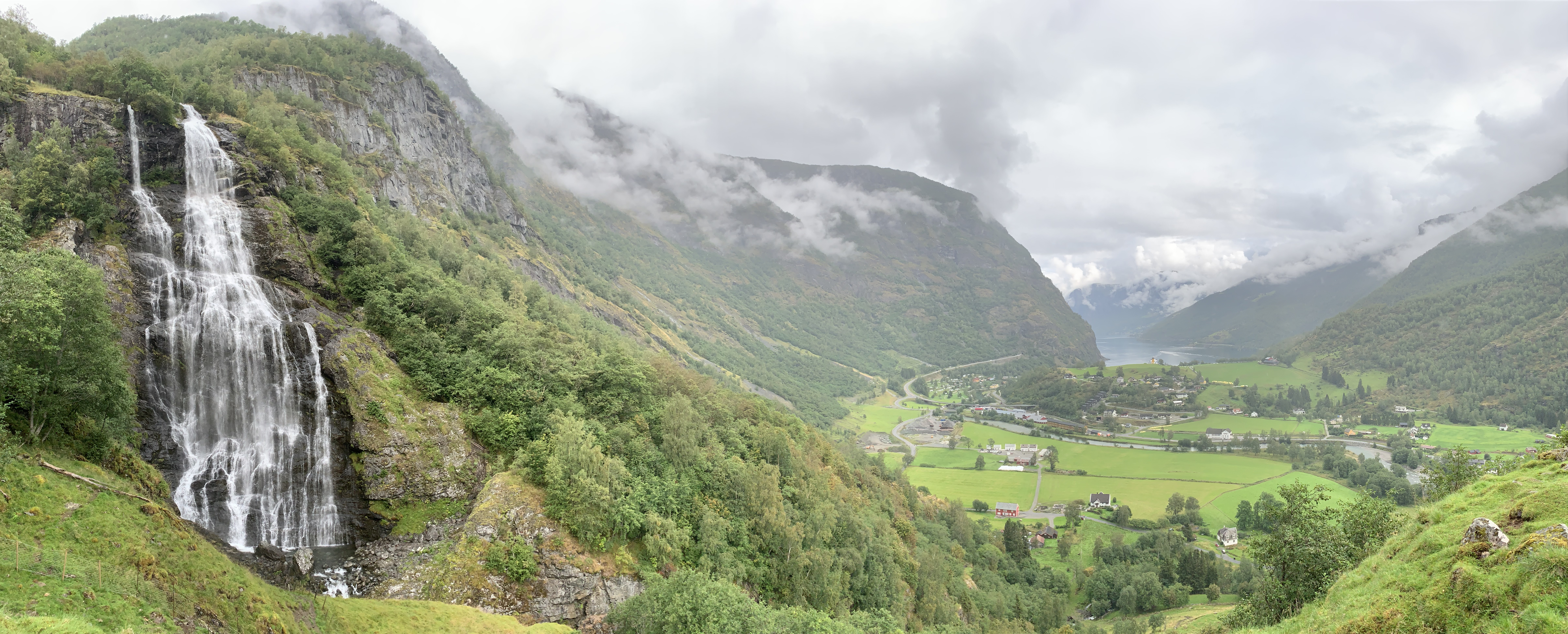
Aurlandsfjord in August 2019

== See also ==
- List of villages in Sogn og Fjordane
- List of churches in Sogn og Fjordane
