= Alden, Norway =

Island in Askvoll, Norway

Alden
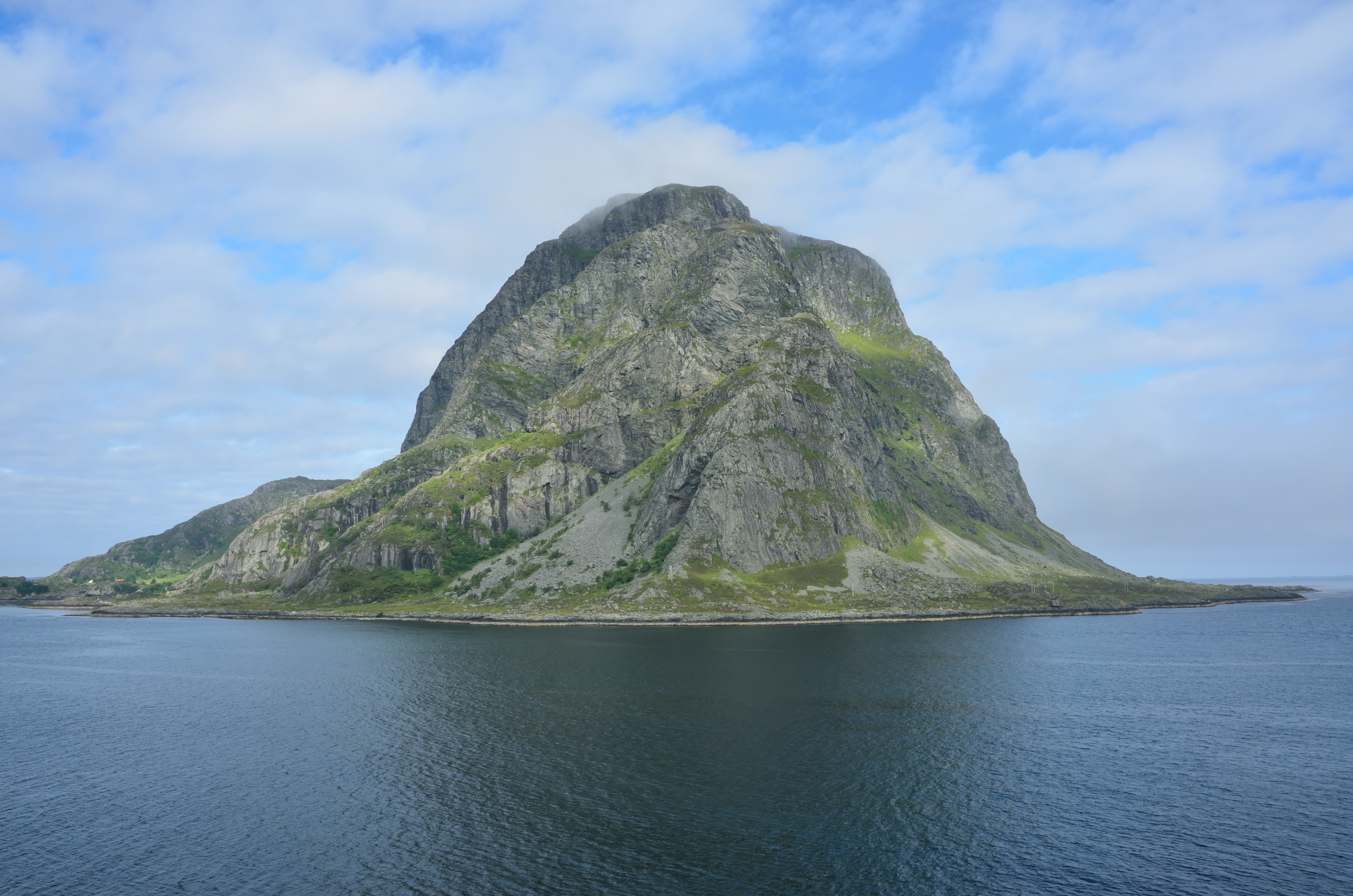
- View of the mountainous island of Alden
- Interactive map of Alden

Geography
- Location: Vestland, Norway
- Coordinates: 61.3256°N 4.7623°E
- Area: 3.4 km^{2} (1.3 sq mi)
- Length: 2.2 km (1.37 mi)
- Width: 2.2 km (1.37 mi)
- Highest elevation: 460 m (1510 ft)
- Highest point: Norskehesten

Administration
- Norway
- County: Vestland
- Municipality: Askvoll Municipality

Alden is an island in Askvoll Municipality in Vestland County, Norway. The 3.4-square-kilometre (1.3 sq mi) island lies off the mainland coast of the Sunnfjord region. The island sits a few kilometers west of the mouth of the Dalsfjorden, 2 kilometres (1.2 mi) to the east of the Værlandet islands and about 5 kilometres (3.1 mi) west of the island of Atløyna. The residents of the island live on the southern shore of the island. The only access to the island is by boat. There are no regular ferries that stop at the island. The nearest ferry stop is on Værøyna, the main island in the Værlandet group, about 2.2 kilometres (1.4 mi) to the southwest. The ferry from Værlandet travels to the mainland village of Askvoll about 20 kilometres (12 mi) to the east.

The island is most notable for its 460-metre (1,510 ft) tall mountain called Norskehesten. The mountain dominates the island, giving it very steep coastlines. The only habitable area is on a small flat coastal area on the southern shore. The towering mountain is a familiar landmark to the fishermen who have sailed the local waters for centuries.

== See also ==
- List of islands of Norway
