= Bulandet =

Island group in Askvoll, Norway

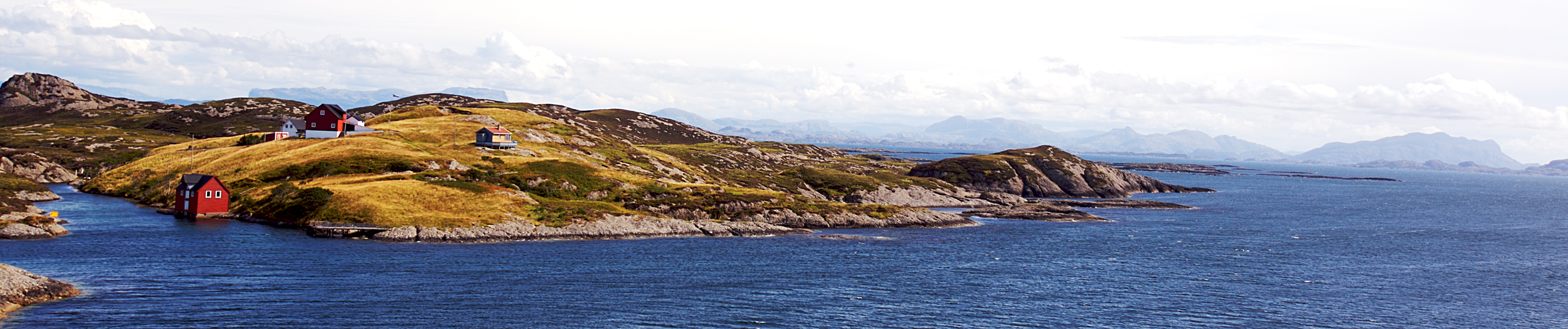
- View of Bulandet
- Interactive map of Bulandet

Geography
- Location: Vestland, Norway
- Coordinates: 61.2972°N 4.6221°E
- Total islands: 300
- Major islands: 15
- Highest elevation: 43 m (141 ft)

Administration
- Norway
- County: Vestland
- Municipality: Askvoll Municipality

Demographics
- Population: 260

Bulandet is an archipelago in the sea off the mainland coast of Western Norway. The island group is part of Askvoll Municipality in Vestland county, Norway. It sits about 20 kilometres (12 mi) west of the mainland coast of Askvoll.

Bulandet is a group of about 300 small islands, although most are uninhabited. The islands of Værlandet and Alden lie immediately east of Bulandet. There is a road that connects most of the inhabited islands of Bulandet to the ferry quay in the Værlandet islands. The Geita Lighthouse lies about 10 kilometres (6.2 mi) southeast of Bulandet.

Bulandet is Norway's westernmost fishing village with a fish packing plant that has freezing and cooling systems. Bulandet Chapel is located at Kjempeneset on one of the main islands. The islands are connected to nearby Værlandet island by a series of bridges and roads. There is a regular ferry stop at Værlandet, connecting all of these islands to the mainland village of Askvoll.

During World War II, Bulandet was used as a port for sailings between Norway, Shetland, and Scotland. The settlement at Bulandet was ravaged by punitive German attacks.

== See also ==
- List of islands of Norway
