= Norm (given name) =

Norm is a masculine given name, most often a short form (hypocorism) of Norman. People named Norm include:

- Norm Abram (born 1949), carpenter on the television show This Old House
- Norm Cash (1933–1986), American baseball player
- Norm Chow (born 1946), American football coach
- Norm Cox (American football) (1925–2008), American football quarterback
- Norm Cox (designer) (born 1951), American interaction designer
- Norm Daniels (born 1942), American healthcare and public health ethicist
- Norm Glockson (1894–1955), American baseball and football player
- Norm Harvey (1899–1941), American football player
- Norm Kelly (born 1941), Canadian politician
- Norm Kelly (Australian politician) (born 1959)
- Norm Macdonald (disambiguation), multiple people
- Norm Maciver (born 1964), Canadian National Hockey League executive and former player
- Norm McBride (born 1947), American football player
- Norm Miller (politician) (born 1956), Canadian politician
- Norm Miller (baseball) (born 1946), American Major League baseball player
- Norm Neeson (1934–2020), Australian rules footballer
- Norm Nixon (born 1955), American basketball player
- Norm Oliver (footballer, born 1885) (1885–1938), Australian rules footballer
- Norm Oliver (footballer, born 1922) (1922–1944), Australian rules footballer
- Norm Peterson, fictional character in the U.S. TV series Cheers
- Norm Sherry (1931–2021), American catcher, manager, and coach in Major League Baseball
- Norm Smith (1915–1973), Australian rules football player and coach
- Norm Smith (footballer born 1946), Australian rules footballer
- Norm Smith (rugby union) (c. 1899–1971), Australian rugby union player
- Norm Wells (born 1957), American football player
