= Holmedal Church =

Church in Vestland, Norway

- Holmedal kyrkje
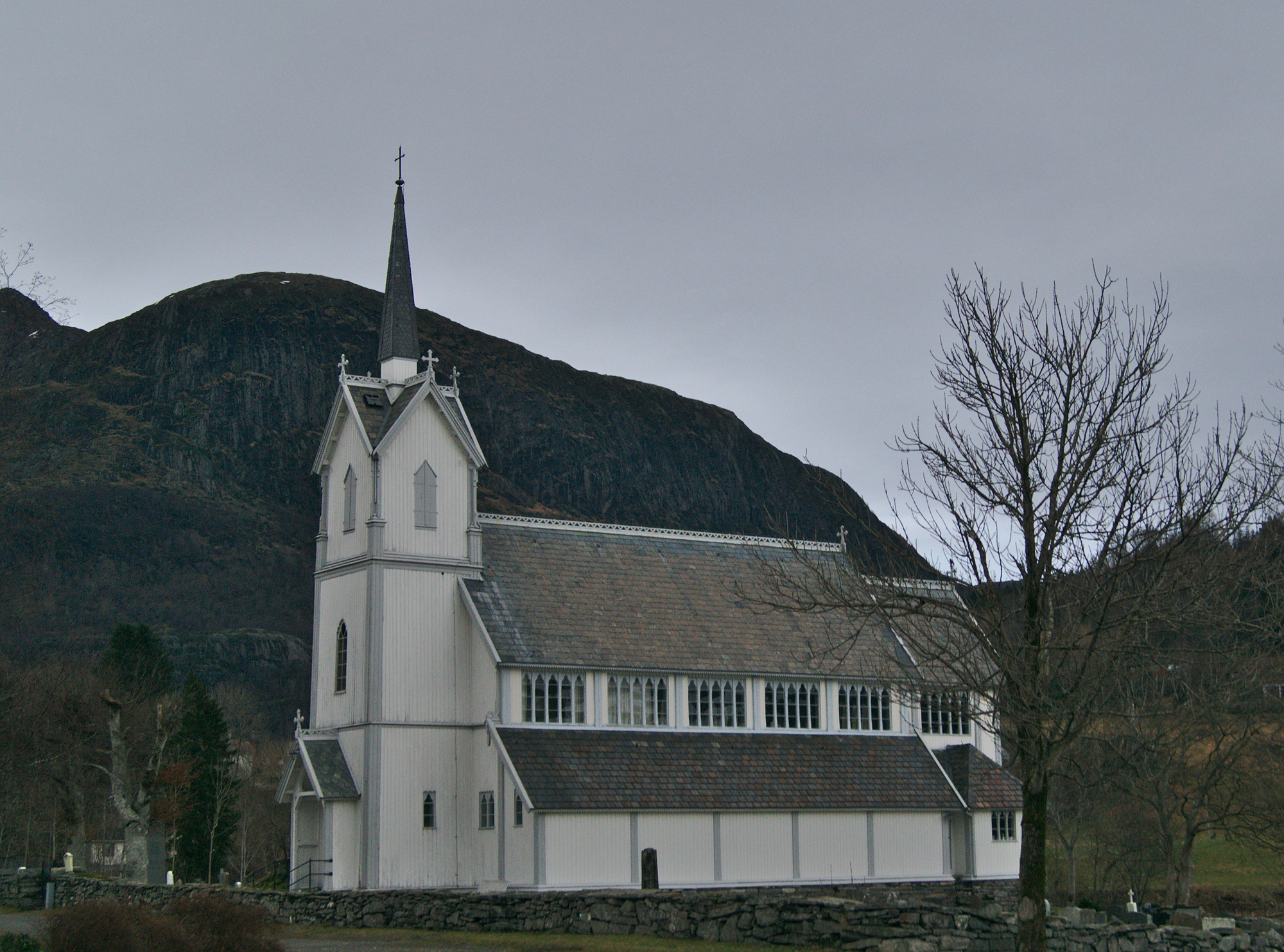
- View of the church
- Holmedal Church
- 61°21′32″N 5°11′18″E
- Location: Askvoll Municipality, Vestland
- Country: Norway
- Denomination: Church of Norway
- Churchmanship: Evangelical Lutheran

History
- Status: Parish church
- Founded: 13th century
- Consecrated: 24 November 1868

Architecture
- Functional status: Active
- Architect: Christian Christie
- Architectural type: Long church
- Completed: 1868 (158 years ago)

Specifications
- Capacity: 400
- Materials: Wood

Administration
- Diocese: Bjørgvin bispedømme
- Deanery: Sunnfjord prosti
- Parish: Askvoll
- Norwegian Cultural Heritage Site
- Type: Church
- Status: Listed
- ID: 84605

Holmedal Church (Norwegian: Holmedal kyrkje) is a parish church of the Church of Norway in Askvoll Municipality in Vestland county, Norway. It is located in the village of Holmedal, on the northern shore of the Dalsfjorden. It is one of several churches for the Askvoll parish which is part of the Sunnfjord prosti (deanery) in the Diocese of Bjørgvin. The white, wooden church was built in a long church style in 1868 using plans drawn up by the architect Christian Christie. The church seats about 400 people.

== History ==
Holmedal is an ancient church site, which in former times was the parish centre for a relatively large area. The earliest existing historical records of the church date back to the year 1305, but the church was not new that year. The first known church was a wooden stave church that was likely built during the 13th century. This church was the main church for the old Holmedal parish, which once covered the length of the Dalsfjorden and further up the river Gaula to the Gaularfjellet mountains. Around the year 1600, the medieval church was torn down and a new, timber-framed church was built on the same site. The new church included a nave that measured about 13.2 by 8.2 metres (43 ft × 27 ft) and a choir that measured about 5.3 by 6 metres (17 ft × 20 ft). The main entrance to the church was through the church porch which measured about 2.2 by 3.8 metres (7 ft 3 in × 12 ft 6 in). In 1868, after more than 150 years of use, the church was torn down and replaced with a new building on the same site. This new church was consecrated on 24 November 1868 by bishop Peter Hersleb Graah Birkeland.

In 1814, this church served as an election church (Norwegian: valgkirke). Together with more than 300 other parish churches across Norway, it was a polling station for elections to the 1814 Norwegian Constituent Assembly which wrote the Constitution of Norway. This was Norway's first national elections. Each church parish was a constituency that elected people called "electors" who later met together in each county to elect the representatives for the assembly that was to meet at Eidsvoll Manor later that year.

Since Holmedal Church was such an important regional church, that in 1838 when municipalities were created in Norway, the two municipalities for this area were named Indre Holmedal Municipality and Ytre Holmedal Municipality. Over time, the old parish was split up into two parishes and then in 1990, this part of Fjaler Municipality was transferred to Askvoll Municipality. The church is now one of the churches in the Askvoll parish.

== Building ==
The nave is about 16 metres (52 ft) long and 11 metres (36 ft) wide, including the side aisles with a total width of 4 metres (13 ft). Furthest to the east, the chancel is rounded off with an apse-inspired three-sided wall encircling the beautiful altarpiece from the 17th century and the altar table. The octagonal altar rail complements the architectural lines in this part of the church. On the eastern wall above the altarpiece there is a square window put on edge showing a dove motif in coloured glass. In the central nave there are five big windows in the upper part of the walls, but none on the walls in the side aisles. All the windows are divided into five sections with a clover-leaf pattern on top. This clover-leaf form is repeated in many places in the interior, for example as a decorative element on the organ, and carvings in the partition corners between the main and side aisles.

== See also ==
- List of churches in Bjørgvin
