= Norum =

Norum is a surname. Notable people with the surname include:

- John Norum (born 1964), Swedish hard rock guitarist of Norwegian background
- Kaare R. Norum (1932–2019), Norwegian physician and professor
- Kaja Norum (born 1989), Norwegian model and painter
- Kåre Norum (1907–1981), Norwegian educator and resistance member
- Karl Norum (1852–1911), Norwegian architect
- Tone Norum (born 1965), Swedish pop artist

== See also ==
- Norm (given name)
