= Vilnes Church =

Church in Vestland, Norway

- Vilnes kyrkje
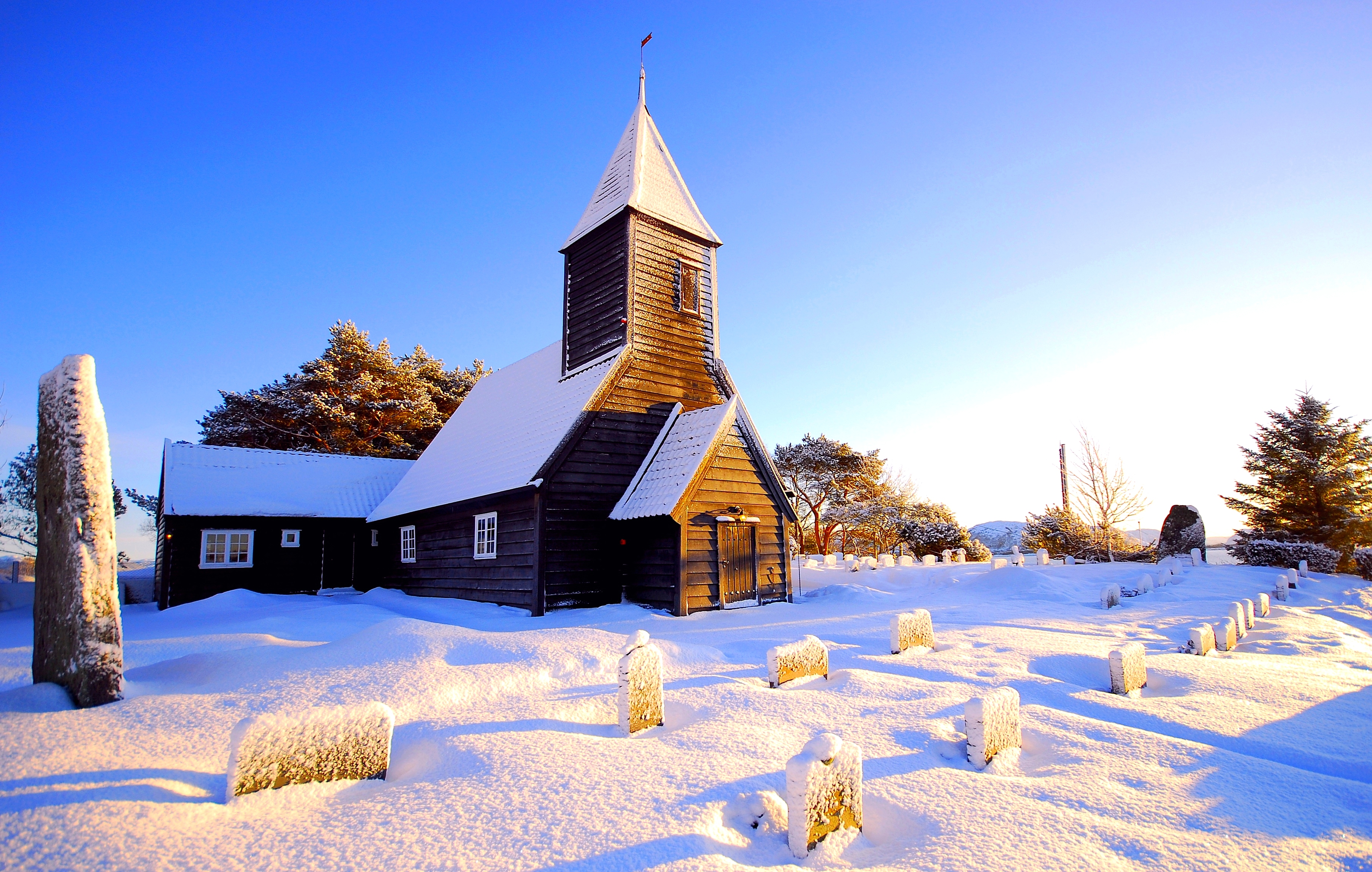
- View of the church
- Vilnes Church
- 61°19′08″N 4°57′46″E
- Location: Askvoll Municipality, Vestland
- Country: Norway
- Denomination: Church of Norway
- Churchmanship: Evangelical Lutheran

History
- Status: Parish church
- Founded: 13th century
- Consecrated: 1674

Architecture
- Functional status: Active
- Architect: Otthe Jonassøn
- Architectural type: Long church
- Completed: 1674 (352 years ago)

Specifications
- Capacity: 130
- Materials: Wood

Administration
- Diocese: Bjørgvin bispedømme
- Deanery: Sunnfjord prosti
- Parish: Askvoll
- Norwegian Cultural Heritage Site
- Type: Church
- Status: Automatically protected
- ID: 85848

Vilnes Church (Norwegian: Vilnes kirke) is a parish church of the Church of Norway in Askvoll Municipality in Vestland county, Norway. It is located in the village of Vilnes on the south side of the island of Atløyna. It is one of several churches for the Askvoll parish which is part of the Sunnfjord prosti (deanery) in the Diocese of Bjørgvin. The brown, wooden church was built in a long church style in 1674 using designs by the local parish priest, Otthe Jonassøn. The church seats about 130 people.

== History ==
The earliest existing historical records of the church date back to the year 1330, but the church was not new that year. The original church at Vilnes was likely a wooden stave church. The altarpiece is dated as 1250 AD, so it is very likely the church was built around that time. The old medieval church stood for centuries until 1673 when it was struck by lightning and burned to the ground.

The following spring and summer, the parish residents quickly built a new church using plans by the local parish priest, Otthe Jonassøn. Not being an architect, the church was completed, but there were some areas of the design that were lacking. In 1686, the church had to replace part of the roof that had not been built correctly. The church was cold and drafty, and often on a windy and snowy day, some snow was able to find its way into the church. One particular story that is recorded by the priest Heiberg in the parish register was that the Sunday after Easter in 1817 he could not hold a worship service because "the church was so full of snow that you waded into it, and on the altar was probably 3 inches (76 mm) thick with snow".

After World War II, the architects Johan Lindstrøm and his son Claus Lindstrøm were hired to renovate, restore, and upgrade the church. The project lasted throughout the 1950s, and they took care to maintain the historical look of the church. They rebuilt the roofs, insulated the walls, and added lights and heating. They also added a sacristy on the north side of the chancel.

== See also ==
- List of churches in Bjørgvin
