= Værlandet =

Island in Vestland, Norway

- Interactive map of Værlandet

Geography
- Location: Vestland, Norway
- Coordinates: 61.3021°N 4.7010°E
- Area: 9 km^{2} (3.5 sq mi)
- Length: 4.4 km (2.73 mi)
- Width: 3.5 km (2.17 mi)
- Highest elevation: 163 m (535 ft)
- Highest point: Høgkletten

Administration
- Norway
- County: Vestland
- Municipality: Askvoll Municipality

Demographics
- Population: 200 (2001)

Værlandet is an island in Askvoll Municipality in Vestland county, Norway. The 9-square-kilometre (3.5 sq mi) island lies immediately east of the Bulandet island group. The island of Alden lies about 2 kilometres (1.2 mi) northeast of Værlandet. The island lies about 16 kilometres (9.9 mi) west of the mainland coast of Askvoll, and it is only accessible by boat. There is a regular ferry route connecting Værlandet to the mainland village of Askvoll. There is a series of bridges that connect Værlandet to the islands of Bulandet to the west. Værlandet Chapel is located on the island. In 2001, there were about 200 residents on the islands.

The Værlandet LORAN-C transmitter was located on the island, but demolished on 19 Sep 2017.

== See also ==
- List of islands of Norway
