= Askvoll Municipality =

Municipality in Vestland, Norway

Askvoll Municipality Askvoll kommune
- Municipality
- Askvold herred (historic name)
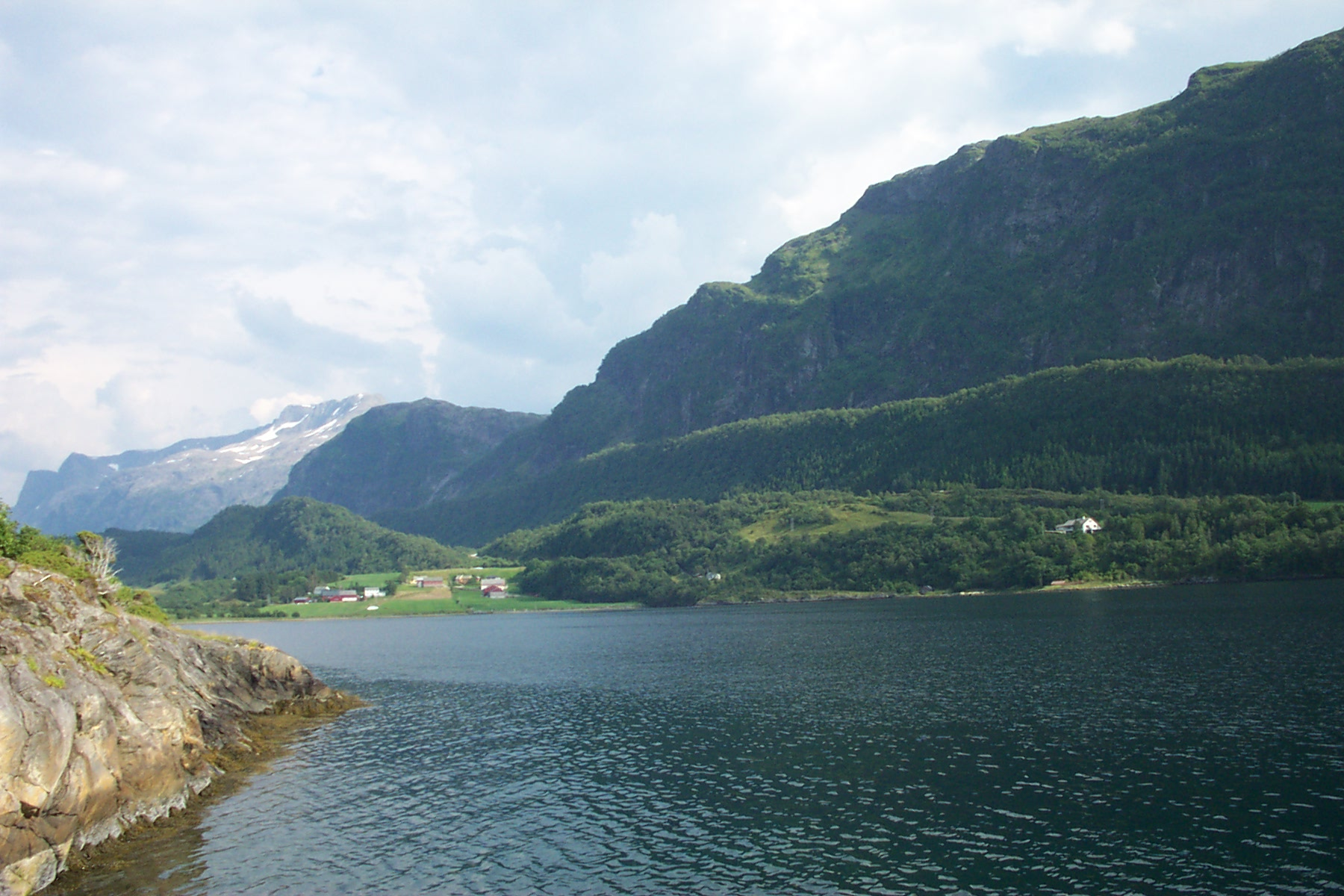
- View of the village of Gjelsvik along the Førdefjorden

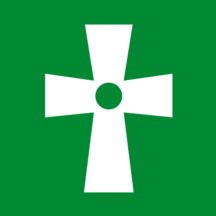
- Flag Coat of arms

- Vestland within Norway

- Askvoll within Vestland
- Coordinates: 61°24′21″N 05°14′32″E
- Country: Norway
- County: Vestland
- District: Sunnfjord
- Established: 1 Jan 1838
  - Created as: Formannskapsdistrikt
- Administrative centre: Askvoll

Government
  - Mayor (2017): Ole André Klausen (H)

Area
  - Total: 326.24 km^{2} (125.96 sq mi)
  - Land: 312.92 km^{2} (120.82 sq mi)
  - Water: 13.32 km^{2} (5.14 sq mi) 4.1%
  - Rank: #255 in Norway
- Highest elevation: 1,303.69 m (4,277.2 ft)

Population (2025)
  - Total: 2,930
  - Rank: #232 in Norway
  - Density: 9/km^{2} (23/sq mi)
  - Change (10 years): ▼ −0.8%
- Demonym: Askvolling

Official language
  - Norwegian form: Nynorsk
- Time zone: UTC+01:00 (CET)
  - Summer (DST): UTC+02:00 (CEST)
- ISO 3166 code: NO-4645
- Website: Official website

Askvoll is a municipality in Vestland county, Norway. It is located in the traditional district of Sunnfjord. The administrative centre is the village of Askvoll. Other villages in the municipality include Holmedal, Kvammen, and Stongfjorden. The most important industries in Askvoll today are Helle Knivfabrikk (a knife factory), Bulandet Fiskeindustri (fish industry), and Sigurd Løkeland Hermetikkfabrikk (a producer of crabs).

The 326.24-square-kilometre (125.96 sq mi) municipality is the 255th largest by area out of the 357 municipalities in Norway. Askvoll Municipality is the 232nd most populous municipality in Norway with a population of 2,930. The municipality's population density is 9 inhabitants per square kilometre (23/sq mi) and its population has decreased by 0.8% over the previous 10-year period.

The municipality stretches from the Bulandet islands in the west and Sunnfjord Municipality in east. The highest peak is the 1,304-metre (4,278 ft) high mountain Blegja. Alden Mountain (known as the "Norwegian Horse") is located on the island of Alden in Askvoll Municipality. It rises almost vertically out of the sea to a height of 481 metres (1,578 ft) above sea level and is visible from more than 100 kilometres (62 mi) out at sea.

In 2016, the chief of police for Vestlandet formally suggested a reconfiguration of police districts and stations. He proposed that the police station in Askvoll be closed.

== General information ==
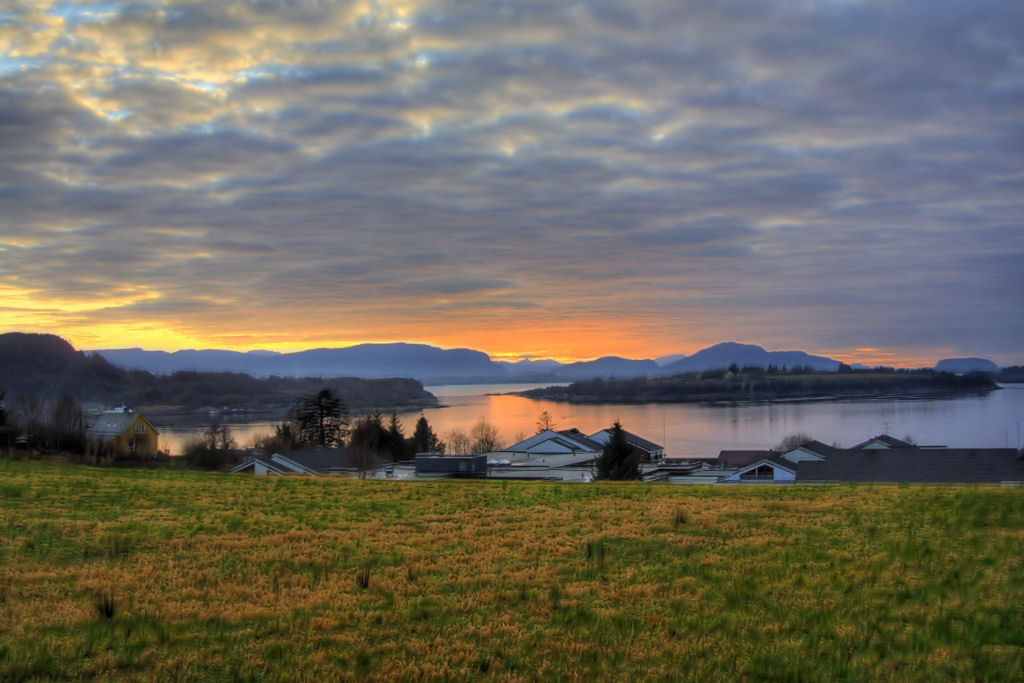
View of Prestmarka

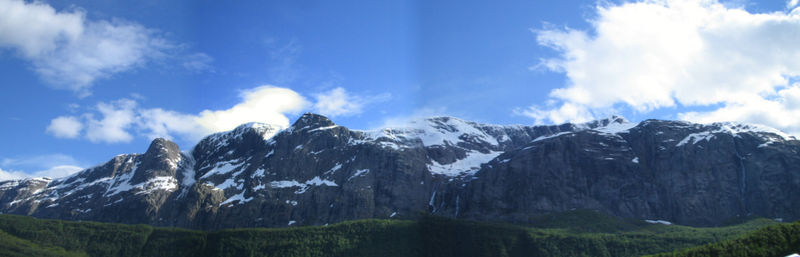
View of the Heilefjell mountains

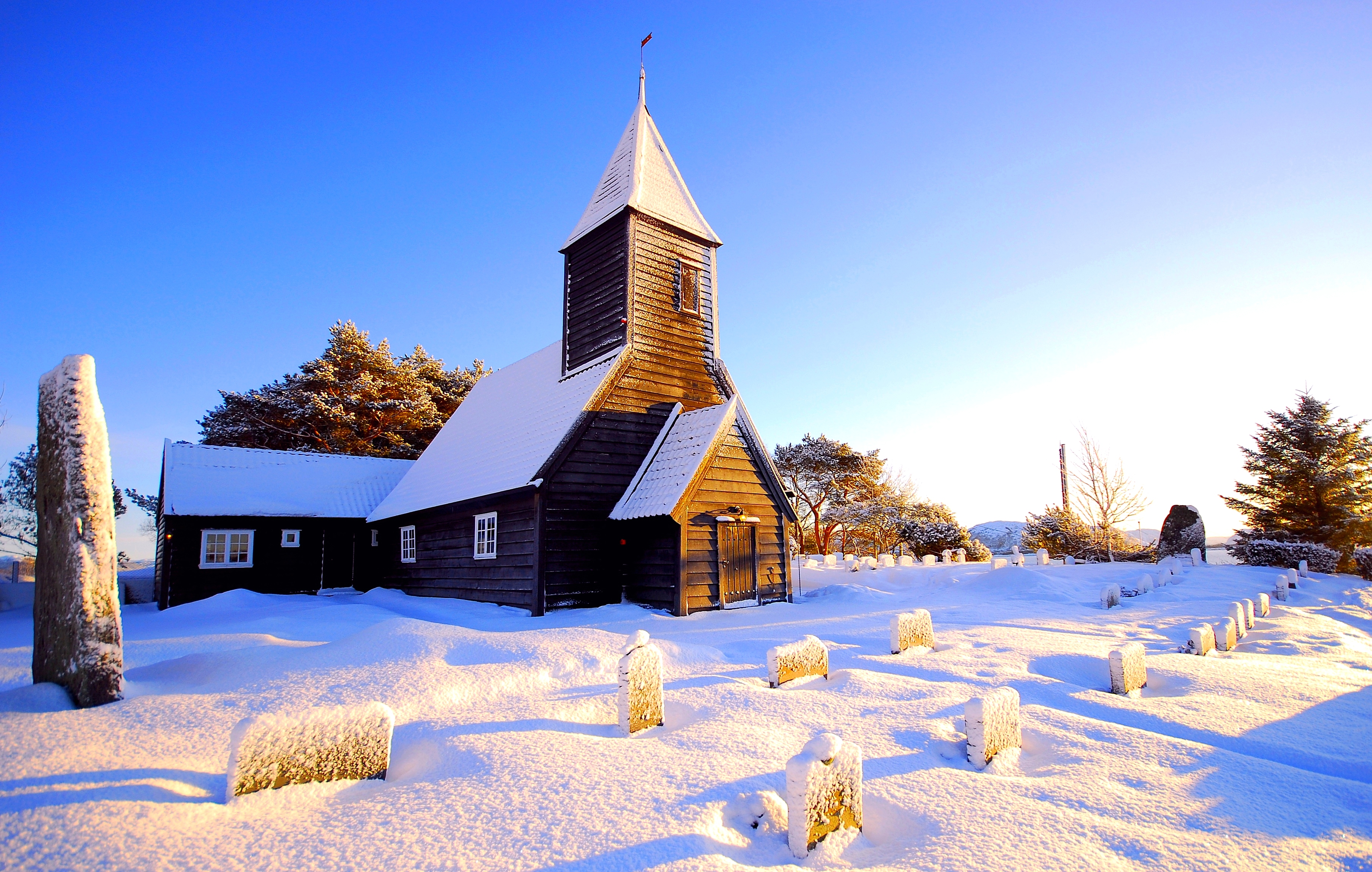
View of Vilnes Church

Askvoll was established as a municipality on 1 January 1838 (see formannskapsdistrikt law). The original municipality was identical to the Askvoll parish (prestegjeld) with the sub-parishes (sokn) of Askvoll, Vilnes, Øn, and Hyllestad.

In 1862, the two southernmost sub-parishes of Øn and Hyllestad (population: 2,475) were separated from Askvoll Municipality and (along with the Bø sub-parish from Lavik Municipality) formed the new Hyllestad Municipality. This left Askvoll Municipality with 2 sub-parishes and a population of 3,065.

On 1 January 1888, several farms in the Hersvikbygda area on the northern part of the island of Sula and the smaller surrounding islands (population: 317) were transferred from Askvoll Municipality to the neighboring Utvær Municipality.

During the 1960s, there were many municipal mergers across Norway due to the work of the Schei Committee. On 1 January 1964, the parts of Vevring Municipality (population: 407) and Bru Municipality (population: 92) that were located south of the Førdefjorden were merged into Askvoll Municipality. This gave Askvoll Municipality a population of 3,585.

On 1 January 1990, Askvoll Municipality and Fjaler Municipality did a land trade: the farms of Vårdal, Holmedal, Rivedal, and part of Hestad (population: 731) were transferred from Fjaler Municipality to Askvoll Municipality; and the farms of Fure, Folkestad, and Våge (population: 482) were transferred from Askvoll Municipality to Fjaler Municipality.

Historically, this municipality was part of the old Sogn og Fjordane county. On 1 January 2020, the municipality became a part of the newly-formed Vestland county (after Hordaland and Sogn og Fjordane counties were merged).

=== Name ===
The municipality (originally the parish) is named after the old Askvoll farm (Old Norse: Askvǫllr) since the first Askvoll Church was built there. The first element is askr which means "ash tree". The last element is vǫllr which means "meadow" or "field". Historically, the name of the municipality was spelled Askvold. On 3 November 1917, a royal resolution changed the spelling of the name of the municipality to Askvoll.

=== Coat of arms ===
The coat of arms was granted on 5 January 1990. The official blazon is "Vert, a pierced Latin cross pattée argent" (Norwegian: På grøn grunn ein utskrådd gjennombora sølv kross). This means the arms have a green field (background) and the charge is a latin cross with a cross pattée design and a circular hole in the centre. The cross has a tincture of argent which means it is commonly colored white, but if it is made out of metal, then silver is used. The design was chosen to symbolize the Korssundkrossen, an old medieval stone cross found in the municipality. The old cross is connected to several stories of St. Olav. The arms were designed by Kåre Ness. The municipal flag has the same design as the coat of arms.

=== Local Churches ===
The Church of Norway has one parish (sokn) within Askvoll Municipality. It is part of the Sunnfjord prosti (deanery) in the Diocese of Bjørgvin.

Churches in Askvoll Municipality
Parish (sokn)	Church name	Location of the church	Year built
Askvoll	Askvoll Church	Askvoll	1863
Askvoll	Bulandet Chapel	Musøya in Bulandet	1905
Askvoll	Holmedal Church	Holmedal	1868
Askvoll	Kvammen Chapel	Kvammen	1977
Askvoll	Stongfjorden Chapel	Stongfjorden	1908
Askvoll	Vilnes Church	Vilnes on Atløyna	1674
Askvoll	Værlandet Chapel	Værlandet	1960

== Government ==
Askvoll Municipality is responsible for primary education (through 10th grade), outpatient health services, senior citizen services, welfare and other social services, zoning, economic development, and municipal roads and utilities. The municipality is governed by a municipal council of directly elected representatives. The mayor is indirectly elected by a vote of the municipal council. The municipality is under the jurisdiction of the Sogn og Fjordane District Court and the Gulating Court of Appeal.

=== Municipal Council ===
The municipal council (Kommunestyre) of Askvoll Municipality is made up of 21 representatives that are elected to four year terms. The tables below show the current and historical composition of the council by political party.

Askvoll kommunestyre 2023–2027
Party name (in Nynorsk)	Number of representatives
Labour Party (Arbeidarpartiet)	2
Conservative Party (Høgre)	9
Christian Democratic Party (Kristeleg Folkeparti)	1
Centre Party (Senterpartiet)	4
Socialist Left Party (Sosialistisk Venstreparti)	3
Liberal Party (Venstre)	2
Total number of members:	21

Askvoll kommunestyre 2019–2023
Party name (in Nynorsk)	Number of representatives
Labour Party (Arbeidarpartiet)	2
Conservative Party (Høgre)	7
Centre Party (Senterpartiet)	6
Socialist Left Party (Sosialistisk Venstreparti)	2
Liberal Party (Venstre)	4
Total number of members:	21

Askvoll kommunestyre 2015–2019
Party name (in Nynorsk)	Number of representatives
Labour Party (Arbeidarpartiet)	3
Conservative Party (Høgre)	8
Centre Party (Senterpartiet)	4
Socialist Left Party (Sosialistisk Venstreparti)	1
Liberal Party (Venstre)	5
Total number of members:	21

Askvoll kommunestyre 2011–2015
Party name (in Nynorsk)	Number of representatives
Labour Party (Arbeidarpartiet)	4
Conservative Party (Høgre)	6
Christian Democratic Party (Kristeleg Folkeparti)	2
Centre Party (Senterpartiet)	4
Liberal Party (Venstre)	5
Total number of members:	21

Askvoll kommunestyre 2007–2011
Party name (in Nynorsk)	Number of representatives
Labour Party (Arbeidarpartiet)	6
Progress Party (Framstegspartiet)	1
Conservative Party (Høgre)	3
Christian Democratic Party (Kristeleg Folkeparti)	2
Centre Party (Senterpartiet)	5
Socialist Left Party (Sosialistisk Venstreparti)	1
Liberal Party (Venstre)	5
Total number of members:	23

Askvoll kommunestyre 2003–2007
Party name (in Nynorsk)	Number of representatives
Labour Party (Arbeidarpartiet)	5
Progress Party (Framstegspartiet)	1
Conservative Party (Høgre)	3
Christian Democratic Party (Kristeleg Folkeparti)	2
Centre Party (Senterpartiet)	4
Socialist Left Party (Sosialistisk Venstreparti)	2
Liberal Party (Venstre)	6
Total number of members:	23

Askvoll kommunestyre 1999–2003
Party name (in Nynorsk)	Number of representatives
Labour Party (Arbeidarpartiet)	5
Conservative Party (Høgre)	4
Christian Democratic Party (Kristeleg Folkeparti)	2
Centre Party (Senterpartiet)	7
Socialist Left Party (Sosialistisk Venstreparti)	1
Liberal Party (Venstre)	4
Total number of members:	23

Askvoll kommunestyre 1995–1999
Party name (in Nynorsk)	Number of representatives
Labour Party (Arbeidarpartiet)	6
Conservative Party (Høgre)	5
Christian Democratic Party (Kristeleg Folkeparti)	3
Centre Party (Senterpartiet)	12
Socialist Left Party (Sosialistisk Venstreparti)	2
Liberal Party (Venstre)	1
Total number of members:	29

Askvoll kommunestyre 1991–1995
Party name (in Nynorsk)	Number of representatives
Labour Party (Arbeidarpartiet)	6
Conservative Party (Høgre)	3
Christian Democratic Party (Kristeleg Folkeparti)	4
Centre Party (Senterpartiet)	11
Socialist Left Party (Sosialistisk Venstreparti)	2
Liberal Party (Venstre)	2
Local list for Værlandet (Bygdeliste for Værlandet)	1
Total number of members:	29

Askvoll kommunestyre 1987–1991
Party name (in Nynorsk)	Number of representatives
Labour Party (Arbeidarpartiet)	7
Conservative Party (Høgre)	5
Christian Democratic Party (Kristeleg Folkeparti)	5
Centre Party (Senterpartiet)	6
Socialist Left Party (Sosialistisk Venstreparti)	2
Liberal Party (Venstre)	3
Local list for Værlandet (Krinsliste for Værlandet)	1
Total number of members:	29

Askvoll kommunestyre 1983–1987
Party name (in Nynorsk)	Number of representatives
Labour Party (Arbeidarpartiet)	8
Conservative Party (Høgre)	7
Christian Democratic Party (Kristeleg Folkeparti)	4
Centre Party (Senterpartiet)	6
Liberal Party (Venstre)	3
Local list Hestvik-Stavestrand (Bygdeliste Hestvik-Stavestrand)	1
Total number of members:	29

Askvoll kommunestyre 1979–1983
Party name (in Nynorsk)	Number of representatives
Labour Party (Arbeidarpartiet)	5
Conservative Party (Høgre)	3
Christian Democratic Party (Kristeleg Folkeparti)	3
Centre Party (Senterpartiet)	6
Liberal Party (Venstre)	2
Local list for the islands (Bygdeliste for Øyane)	7
Local list of Stavenes-Størdal-Hestvik area (Bygdeliste for området Stavenes-Størdal-Hestvik)	3
Total number of members:	29

Askvoll kommunestyre 1975–1979
Party name (in Nynorsk)	Number of representatives
Labour Party (Arbeidarpartiet)	5
Conservative Party (Høgre)	3
Christian Democratic Party (Kristeleg Folkeparti)	3
Centre Party (Senterpartiet)	9
Joint list of the Liberal Party (Venstre) and New People's Party (Nye Folkepartiet)	2
Local list for the islands (Bygdeliste for Øyane)	7
Total number of members:	29

Askvoll kommunestyre 1971–1975
Party name (in Nynorsk)	Number of representatives
Labour Party (Arbeidarpartiet)	5
Conservative Party (Høgre)	1
Christian Democratic Party (Kristeleg Folkeparti)	4
Local List(s) (Lokale lister)	19
Total number of members:	29

Askvoll kommunestyre 1967–1971
Party name (in Nynorsk)	Number of representatives
Labour Party (Arbeidarpartiet)	5
Conservative Party (Høgre)	4
Christian Democratic Party (Kristeleg Folkeparti)	4
Liberal Party (Venstre)	6
Joint List(s) of Non-Socialist Parties (Borgarlege Felleslister)	6
Local List(s) (Lokale lister)	4
Total number of members:	29

Askvoll kommunestyre 1963–1967
Party name (in Nynorsk)	Number of representatives
Labour Party (Arbeidarpartiet)	6
Joint List(s) of Non-Socialist Parties (Borgarlege Felleslister)	20
Local List(s) (Lokale lister)	3
Total number of members:	29

Askvoll heradsstyre 1959–1963
Party name (in Nynorsk)	Number of representatives
Labour Party (Arbeidarpartiet)	4
Liberal Party (Venstre)	10
Joint List(s) of Non-Socialist Parties (Borgarlege Felleslister)	7
Local List(s) (Lokale lister)	4
Total number of members:	25

Askvoll heradsstyre 1955–1959
Party name (in Nynorsk)	Number of representatives
Labour Party (Arbeidarpartiet)	3
Conservative Party (Høgre)	3
Joint List(s) of Non-Socialist Parties (Borgarlege Felleslister)	12
Local List(s) (Lokale lister)	7
Total number of members:	25

Askvoll heradsstyre 1951–1955
Party name (in Nynorsk)	Number of representatives
Labour Party (Arbeidarpartiet)	7
Conservative Party (Høgre)	3
Joint List(s) of Non-Socialist Parties (Borgarlege Felleslister)	14
Total number of members:	24

Askvoll heradsstyre 1947–1951
Party name (in Nynorsk)	Number of representatives
Labour Party (Arbeidarpartiet)	4
Joint List(s) of Non-Socialist Parties (Borgarlege Felleslister)	20
Total number of members:	24

Askvoll heradsstyre 1945–1947
Party name (in Nynorsk)	Number of representatives
Labour Party (Arbeidarpartiet)	5
Joint List(s) of Non-Socialist Parties (Borgarlege Felleslister)	11
Local List(s) (Lokale lister)	8
Total number of members:	24

Askvoll heradsstyre 1937–1941*
Party name (in Nynorsk)	Number of representatives
Labour Party (Arbeidarpartiet)	5
Joint List(s) of Non-Socialist Parties (Borgarlege Felleslister)	19
Total number of members:	24
Note: Due to the German occupation of Norway during World War II, no elections were held for new municipal councils until after the war ended in 1945.

=== Mayors ===
The mayor (Nynorsk: ordførar) of Askvoll Municipality is the political leader of the municipality and the chairperson of the municipal council. Here is a list of people who have held this position:

- 1838–1839: Georg Prahl Harbitz
- 1840–1841: Kolbein B. Rødseth
- 1842–1857: Rev. Carl Johan Christie
- 1858–1863: Mons Andersen Askevold
- 1864–1867: Rev. Carl Johan Christie
- 1868–1871: Mathias Villumsen Rødsæth
- 1872–1873: Jens Olsen Askevold
- 1874–1879: Kolbein Sørensen Fismen
- 1880–1907: Ole Sjursen Nordeide
- 1908–1934: Mathias Kristiansen Stubseid (V)
- 1934–1942: Olai Einen
- 1942–1945: Harald Slåttelid (NS)
- 1945–1945: Olai Einen
- 1946–1955: Sverre Ringstad (Bp)
- 1956–1963: Mads Flokenes (V)
- 1964–1971: Magne Loftheim
- 1972–1988: Kåre Ness (Sp)
- 1988–1993: Jorunn Ringstad (Sp)
- 1993–2003: Kjellaug Veivåg Høyvik (Sp)
- 2003–2011: Aud Kari Steinsland (Ap)
- 2011–2017: Frida Melvær (H)
- 2017–present: Ole André Klausen (H)

== Geography ==
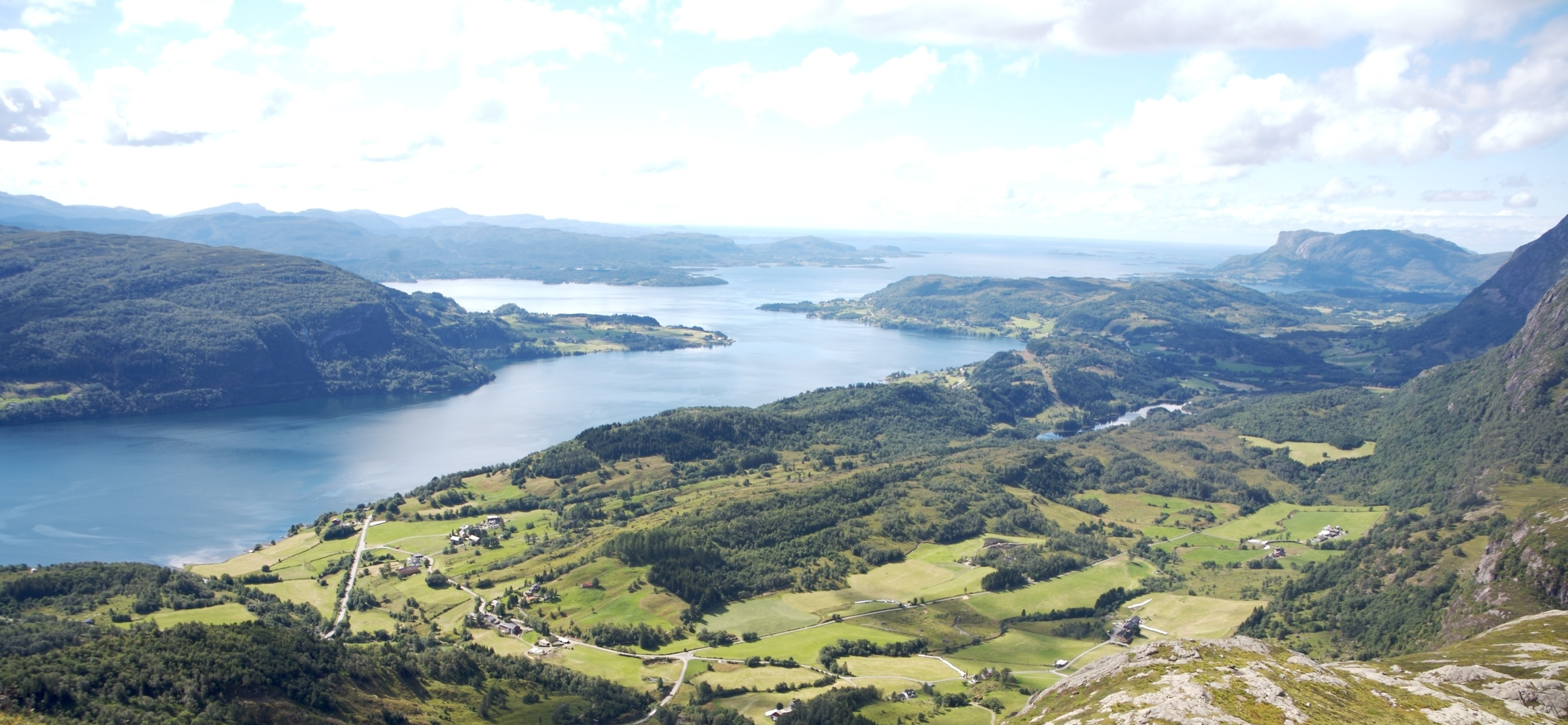
View of Rivedal (and Fjaler municipality on the left side of the fjord)

Askvoll Municipality covers an area of 321 square kilometres (124 sq mi). Of this, 254 square kilometres (98 sq mi) are on the mainland while the remaining 67 square kilometres (26 sq mi) are made up of islands and skerries along its 52 kilometres (32 mi) coastline. The highest point in the municipality is the 1,303.69-metre (4,277.2 ft) tall mountain Blægja, located on the border with Sunnfjord Municipality.

To the west, lies the North Sea, to the north is Kinn Municipality, to the northeast and east is Sunnfjord Municipality, and to the south are Fjaler Municipality and Solund Municipality. The majority of the municipality is on the mainland between the Førdefjorden (in the north) and the Dalsfjorden (in the south). The Bulandet archipelago lies in the westernmost part of the municipality. There are many other islands between Bulandet and the mainland, notably Værlandet, Alden, and Atløyna. Geita Lighthouse lies on a very small island off the coast of Askvoll Municipality.

== Attractions ==
=== Birdlife ===
Askvoll has many seabird reserves within the municipality. Otherwise mainland Askvoll provides habitat that is typical for the region. These however have restrictions, especially during the breeding season. One area that is good for birding is the Askvika nature reserve. This wetland area has a rich bird life with 69 recorded species.

=== Bulandet ===
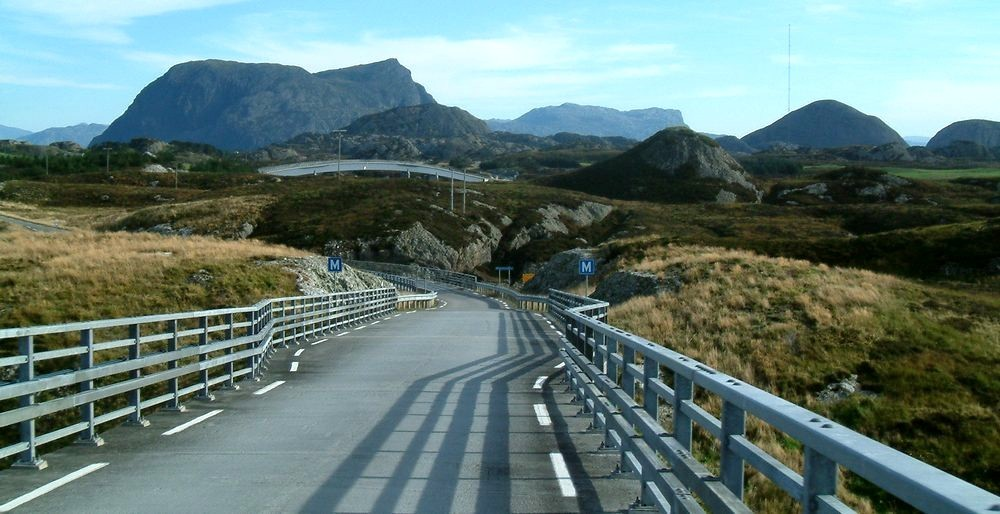
Part of the road between Bulandet and Vaerlandet that opened in 2003. The mountain at the left is Alden.

Bulandet is Norway´s westernmost fishing community. Bulandet includes 365 islands and has approximately 270 inhabitants. During the summer, Bulandet is a favourite spot for boaters and tourists staying in cottages and fisherman cabins. The name "Bulandet" comes from the numerous wharf-side cabins here, known as "bu". Bulandet are linked together to the neighbour community Værlandet by six bridges and 5,240 metres (17,190 ft) of road. The Nordsjøporten road is not only important for traffic and communication in the area but also allows for a fantastic journey through the islands.

=== Værlandet ===
At the mouth of the fjord, near Alden Mountain, is Værlandet island. Værlandet has a population of approximately 200 people. Fishing and fish farming are the most important industries, but both tourism and the export of high quality stone (breccia) to Italy are expanding. There is a collection of picturesque small houses on the water's edge in Værøyhamna harbour.

=== Alden ===
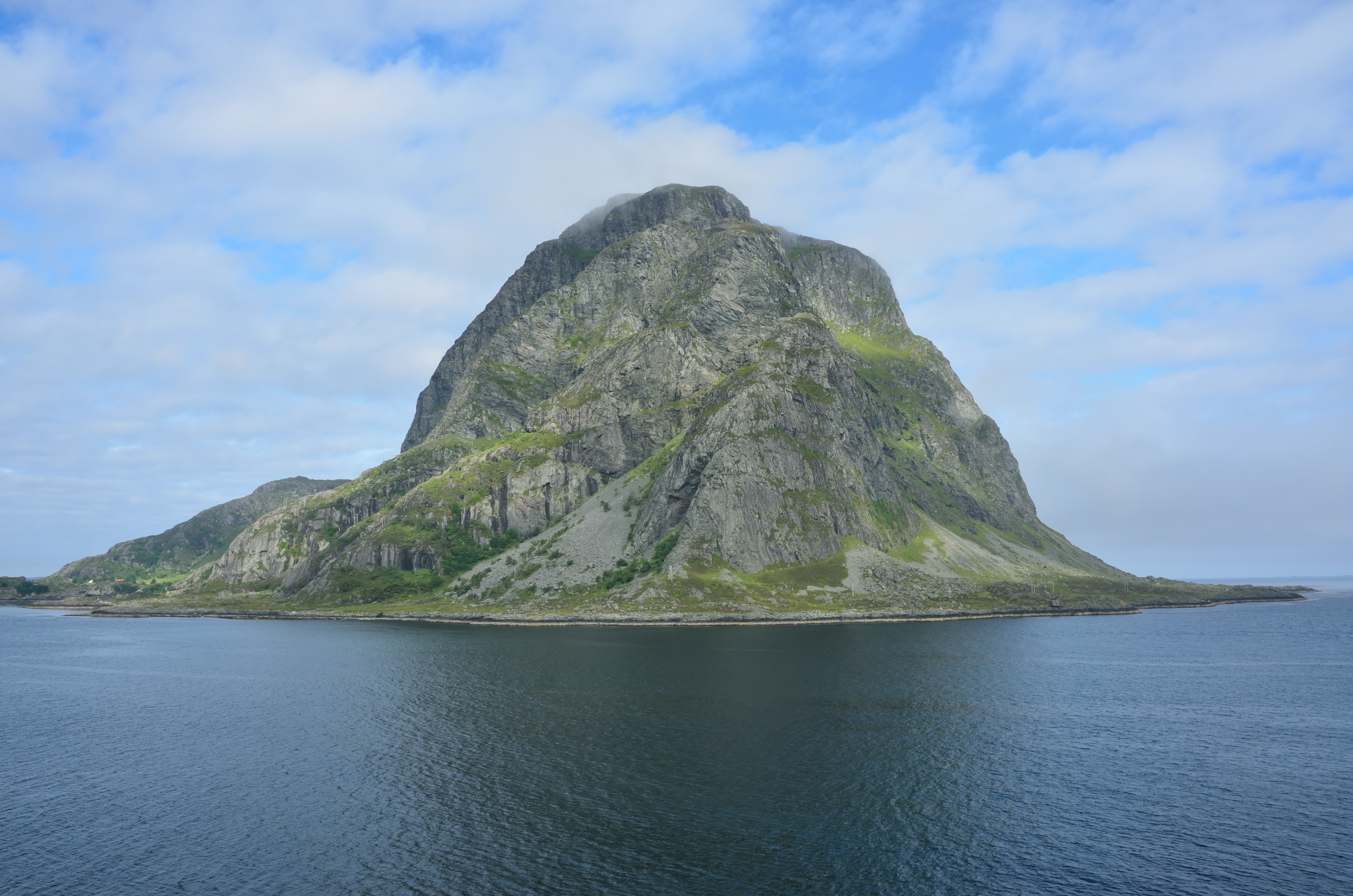
View of Alden

Also known as the "Norwegian Horse", Alden Mountain is an old and pronounced landmark for sailors along the coast. It rises almost vertically out of the sea to a height of 481 metres (1,578 ft) above sea level and is visible from more than 100 kilometres (62 mi) out at sea. There is a marked path to the top, accessible using the scheduled boat service from Askvoll.

=== Blegja ===
The 1,304-metre (4,278 ft) high Blegja mountain in Askvoll has views from the top, and hikers can see the Jostedal Glacier to the east and as far as Snønipa and the Ålfotbreen glacier in Bremanger Municipality.

=== Stongfjord Industries ===
Stongfjord Industries is Norway's oldest aluminium factory, and it is located in the village of Stongfjorden. British Aluminium Company started hydropower plant development in 1906, and produced aluminium from 1908 to 1945. Traces of the English industry are still apparent in the form of private houses, tennis courts, and football fields.

=== Vilnes Church ===
The Vilnes Church on the island of Atløyna is a medieval wooden church constructed in 1674.

=== Ingólfur Arnarson ===
The Ingólfur Arnarson statue in Rivedal is a monument to the pioneer spirit in the Dalsfjorden prior to the year 1000. Together with his brother, Ingólfur Arnarson he discovered Iceland, and laid the groundwork for the first Norwegian settlement there.

== Notable people ==
- Anders Askevold (1834 in Askvoll – 1900), a painter of landscapes and animal paintings
- Nikolaus Gjelsvik (1866 in Vevring – 1938), a Norwegian jurist and law professor
- Arve Furset (born 1964 in Askvoll), a composer, jazz musician (piano, keyboards), and music producer
- Alexander Breidvik (born 1986 in Askvoll), a TV3 talent contest winner and retired Norwegian footballer
