= Stongfjorden =

Village in Askvoll Municipality, Norway

- Village
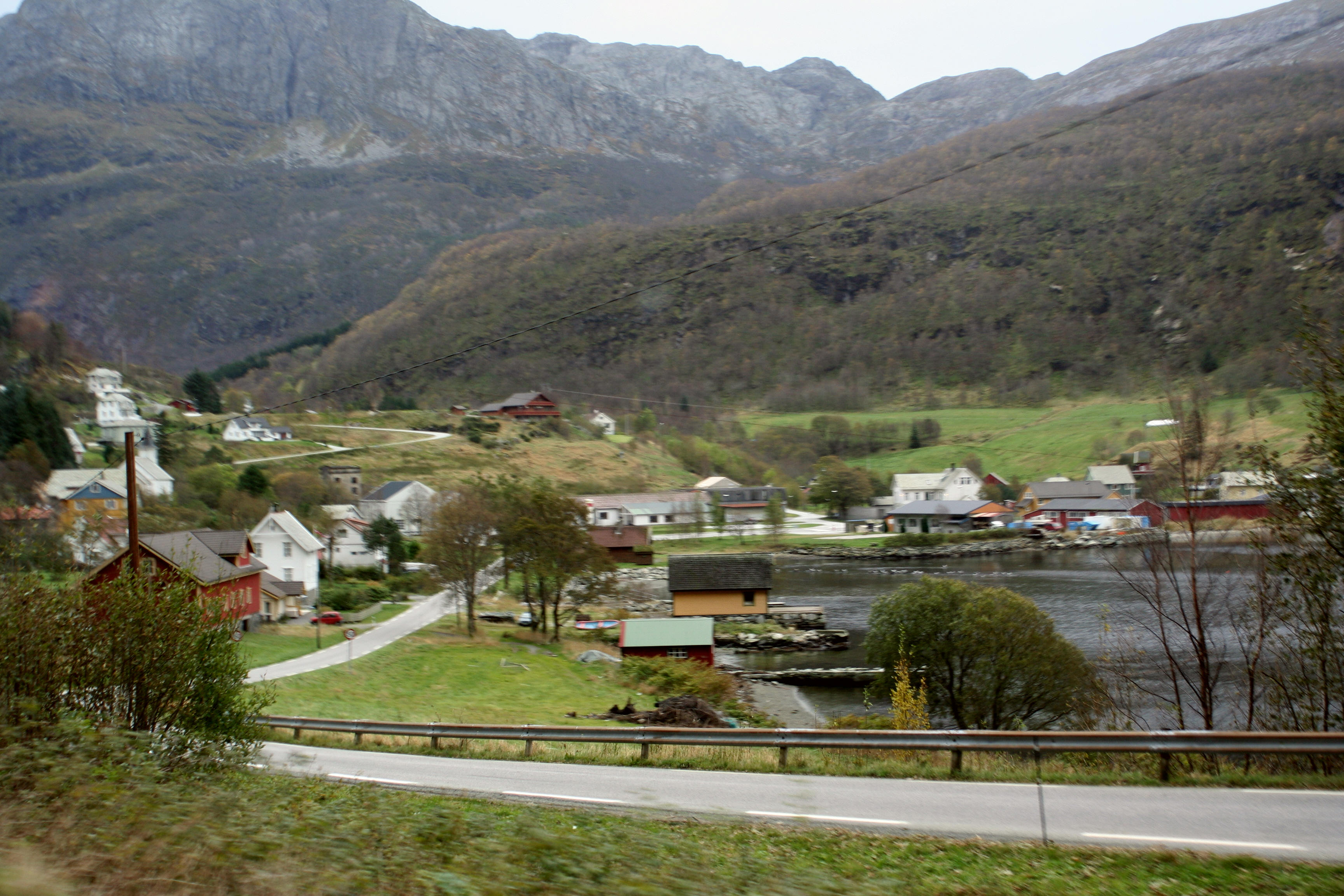
- View of the village
- Interactive map of Stongfjorden
- Location within Vestland Location within Norway
- Coordinates: 61.42772°N 5.16743°E
- Country: Norway
- Region: Western Norway
- County: Vestland
- District: Sunnfjord
- Municipality: Askvoll Municipality
- Elevation: 3 m (9.8 ft)
- Time zone: UTC+01:00 (CET)
  - Summer (DST): UTC+02:00 (CEST)
- Post Code: 6984 Stongfjorden

Stongfjorden is a village in Askvoll Municipality in Vestland county, Norway. The village is located at the head of the Stongfjorden, about 15 kilometres (9.3 mi) northeast of the village of Askvoll and about 15 kilometres (9.3 mi) southwest of the village of Kvammen. The village is an industrial area that was home to the first aluminum manufacturing plant in Scandinavia, Stangfjorden Elektrokemiske Fabriker from 1908 to 1946. The Stongfjorden Chapel is located in the village.
