= Holmedal =

Village in Askvoll Municipality, Norway

- Village
- Interactive map of Holmedal
- Location within Vestland Location within Norway
- Coordinates: 61.35712°N 5.18573°E
- Country: Norway
- Region: Western Norway
- County: Vestland
- District: Sunnfjord
- Municipality: Askvoll Municipality
- Elevation: 5 m (16 ft)
- Time zone: UTC+01:00 (CET)
  - Summer (DST): UTC+02:00 (CEST)
- Post Code: 6982 Holmedal

Holmedal is a village in Askvoll Municipality in Vestland county, Norway. The village is located on the northern shore of the Dalsfjorden, about 7 kilometres (4.3 mi) east of the village of Askvoll. The village has some industries, such as knife factory, Helle Fabrikker. Holmedal Church is also located here.

== History ==
The village is the namesake of the old Indre Holmedal Municipality and Ytre Holmedal Municipality (later renamed Gaular Municipality and Fjaler Municipality respectively). The village of Holmedal was a part of Fjaler Municipality before 1990 when it was administratively transferred to Askvoll Municipality.
