= Alexander Breidvik =

Norwegian footballer (born 1986)

Personal information
- Date of birth: 17 March 1986 (age 40)
- Position: Midfielder

Youth career
- –2002: Askvoll/Holmedal

Senior career*
Years	Team	Apps	(Gls)
2003–2007	Sogndal	19	(1)

International career
2002	Norway u-16	4	(1)
2003	Norway u-17	9	(0)
2004	Norway u-18	3	(0)
- * Club domestic league appearances and goals

Alexander Breidvik (born 17 March 1986) is a retired Norwegian football midfielder.

Hailing from Askvoll Municipality, he first became known in 2002, when he won a talent contest held by the television channel TV3. He then joined Sogndal Fotball, and got one Norwegian Premier League game in 2003 and two in 2004. Sogndal were then relegated.

In early 2007, Breidvik suffered a serious head trauma at La Manga, effectively ending his professional career. In 2008 his former teammates arranged a fundraiser for him.
