= Geita Lighthouse =

Lighthouse in Norway

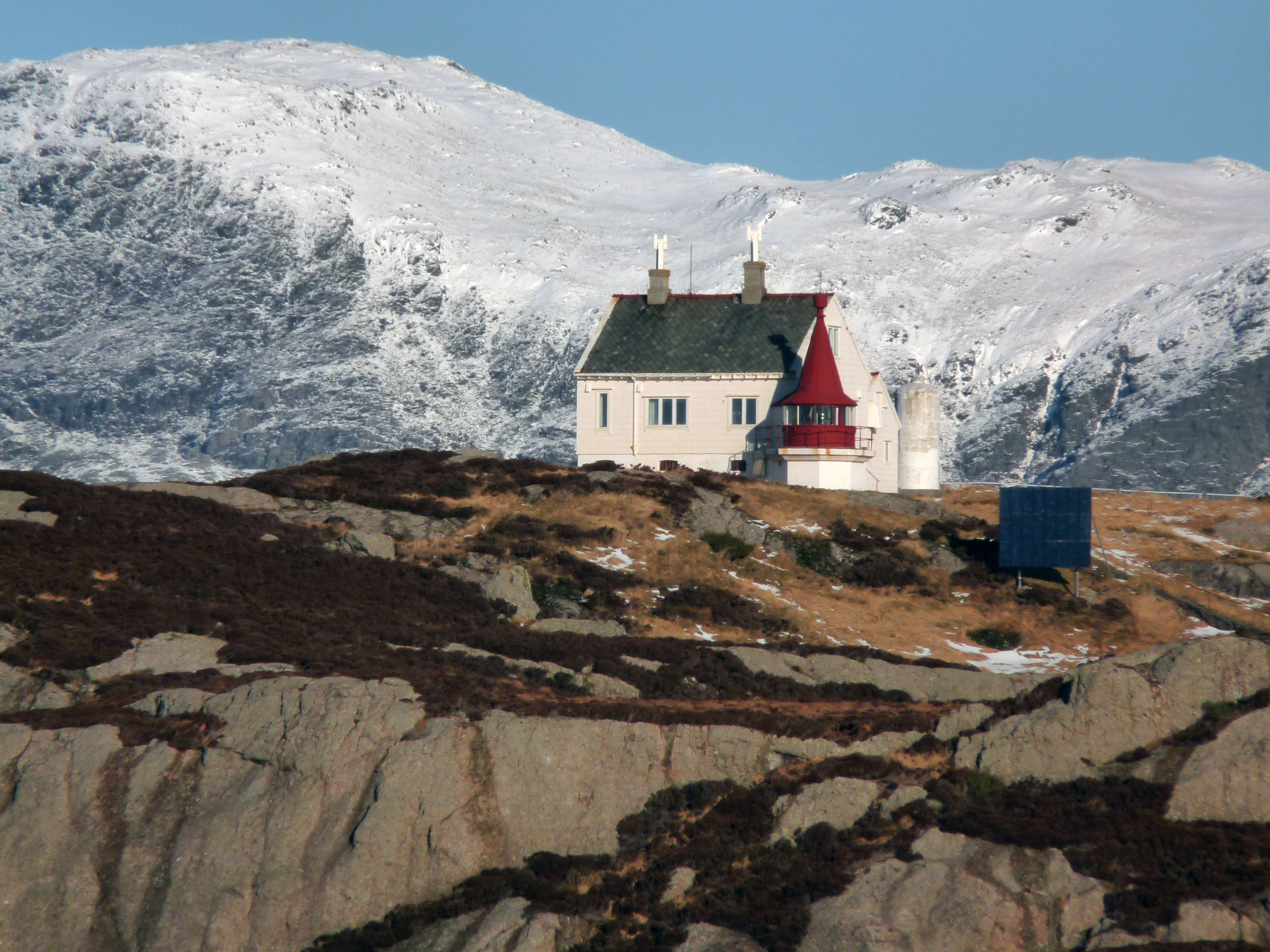
- View of the lighthouse
- Location: Askvoll Municipality, Norway
- Coordinates: 61°16′09″N 4°48′40″E

Tower
- Constructed: 1897
- Automated: 1980
- Height: 10 m (33 ft)
- Markings: red lantern
- Operator: Nordisk Kunstnarsenter Dale
- Heritage: cultural property

Light
- Focal height: 43 m (141 ft)
- Range: 13 nmi (24 km; 15 mi)
- Characteristic: Iso WRG 6s

Geita Lighthouse (Norwegian: Geita fyr) is a coastal lighthouse located in Askvoll Municipality in Vestland county, Norway. It was first lit in 1897 and it was automated from 1980–1982. It was listed as a protected site in 1999.

The 10-metre (33 ft) tall tower emits a white, red, or green light, depending on direction, occulting once every 6 seconds. The red tower is attached to a white lighthouse. The building is available for vacation rental during the summer and is leased to artists at other times. It is located on a small island in the Aspefjord about 8 kilometres (5.0 mi) west of the mainland. The site is accessible only by boat.

== See also ==
- List of lighthouses in Norway
- Lighthouses in Norway
