= Hersvik Church =

Church in Vestland, Norway

- Hersvik kyrkje
- Hersvik Church
- 61°10′18″N 4°53′41″E
- Location: Solund Municipality, Vestland
- Country: Norway
- Denomination: Church of Norway
- Churchmanship: Evangelical Lutheran

History
- Status: Parish church
- Founded: 1891
- Consecrated: 10 November 1891

Architecture
- Functional status: Active
- Architect: Jacob Wilhelm Nordan
- Architectural type: Long church
- Completed: 1891 (135 years ago)

Specifications
- Capacity: 168
- Materials: Wood

Administration
- Diocese: Bjørgvin bispedømme
- Deanery: Nordhordland prosti
- Parish: Solund
- Norwegian Cultural Heritage Site
- Type: Church
- Status: Not protected
- ID: 84563

Hersvik Church (Norwegian: Hersvik kyrkje) is a parish church of the Church of Norway in Solund Municipality in Vestland county, Norway. It is located in the village of Hersvikbygda, on the northern part of the island of Sula. It is one of the three churches for the Solund parish which is part of the Nordhordland prosti (deanery) in the Diocese of Bjørgvin. The white, wooden church was built in a long church design in 1891 using plans drawn up by the architect Jacob Wilhelm Nordan. The church seats about 168 people.

== History ==
In 1888, the prestegjeld (parish) of Solund was established, when it was separated from the large parish of Gulen Municipality. At that time, the new parish did not have enough churches for the number of people in the parish, so they began to plan for a new church in the northern part of the municipality. The church was designed by the architect Jacob Wilhelm Nordan, and it was modeled after the nearby Fedje Church, located to the south of Solund. The church was to be a wooden long church with a 10.4-by-7.8-metre (34 ft × 26 ft) nave and a 4.4-by-4.4-metre (14 ft × 14 ft) choir. The parish hired Peter Gabrielsen as the lead builder for the church. Construction began in the spring of 1891 and it lasted for several months. The new church was consecrated on 10 November 1891 by Bishop Fredrik Waldemar Hvoslef. The new church cost about 8500 kr. In 1915, the church received its first wood stove (it had no heat source before that time). In 1962, electric lighting and heat were installed in the church. From its consecration in 1891 until 1 January 2000, the church was the main church for the Hersvik parish. On 1 January 2000, the three parishes in the municipality of Solund were merged into one large parish with three churches.

== See also ==
- List of churches in Bjørgvin
