= Bulandet Chapel =

Church in Vestland, Norway

- Bulandet bedehuskapell
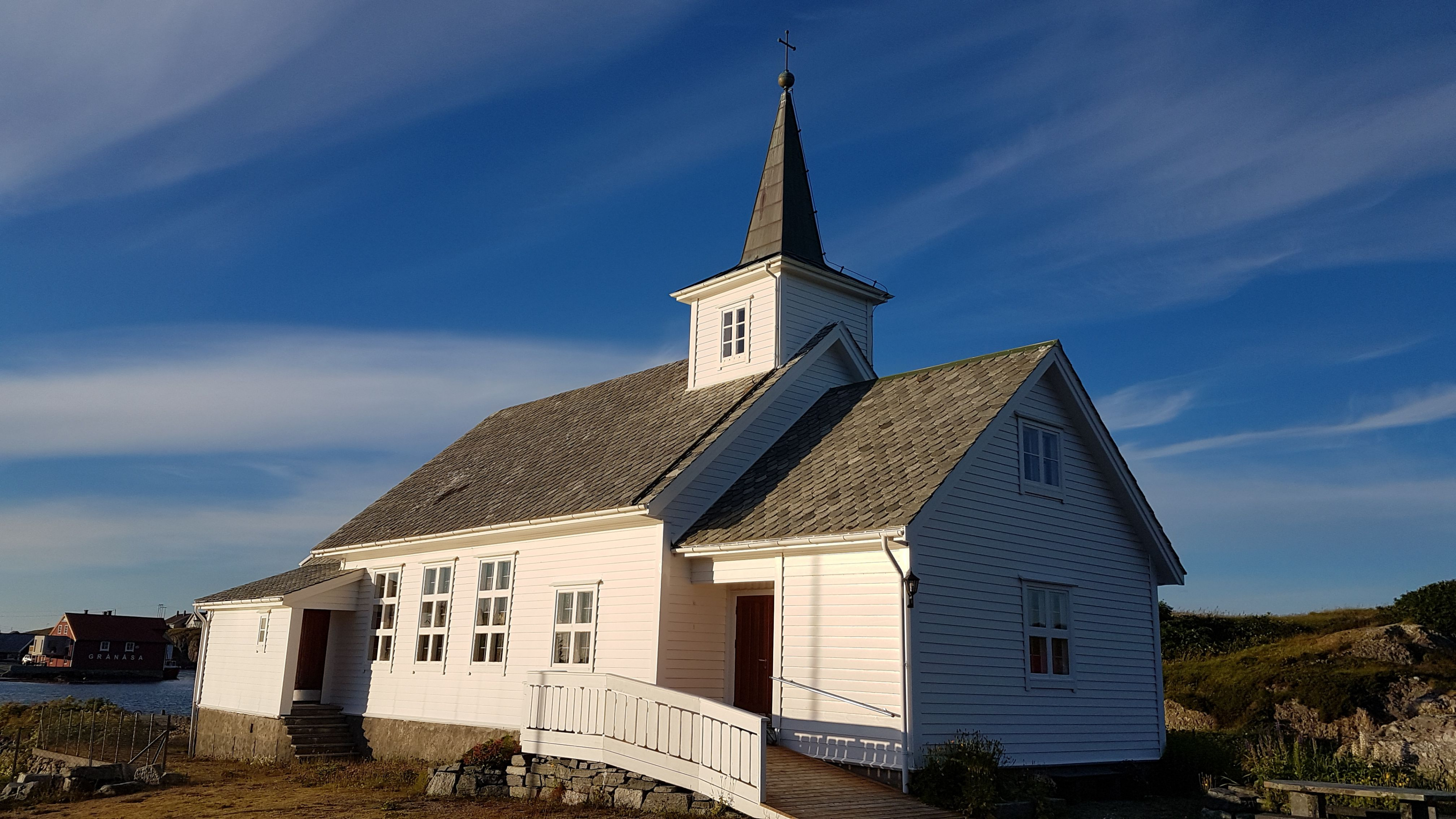
- View of the chapel
- Bulandet Chapel
- 61°17′02″N 4°37′38″E
- Location: Askvoll Municipality, Vestland
- Country: Norway
- Denomination: Church of Norway
- Churchmanship: Evangelical Lutheran

History
- Status: Chapel
- Founded: 1905
- Consecrated: 27 July 1909

Architecture
- Functional status: Active
- Architectural type: Long church
- Completed: 1905 (121 years ago)

Specifications
- Capacity: 170
- Materials: Wood

Administration
- Diocese: Bjørgvin bispedømme
- Deanery: Sunnfjord prosti
- Parish: Askvoll
- Norwegian Cultural Heritage Site
- Type: Church
- Status: Not protected
- ID: 83974

Bulandet Chapel (Norwegian: Bulandet bedehuskapell) is a chapel of the Church of Norway in Askvoll Municipality in Vestland county, Norway. It is located on the Kjempeneset point on the island of Musøya in the Bulandet islands. It is one of three annex chapels in the Askvoll parish which is part of the Sunnfjord prosti (deanery) in the Diocese of Bjørgvin. The white, wooden chapel was built in 1905 in a long church design. It was consecrated as a chapel on 27 July 1909 by the dean for the Sunnfjord prosti, Henrik Borchgrevink. The chapel seats about 170 people.

== History ==
Bulandet has been the site of a church since the Middle Ages. There was once an old chapel on the island of Gjelsa in the Bulandet islands, but that was torn down in 1813. Before that church was built, records show that there once was a church on the nearby island of Kyrkøyna (lit. "the Church Island"). The present chapel sits on the Kjempeneset peninsula on the island of Musøya. This is a very suitable location choice for the third church building since it was the centre of the village area for the islands. In addition to the chapel, there are homes, an inn, and a shop at that site. The small wooden prayer house was constructed in 1905. In 1909, the building was enlarged by adding a chancel and tower, and then it was consecrated as an annex chapel on 27 July 1909 by the local Provost Henrik Borchgrevink. During the 1960s, the chapel was extensively renovated. During this rebuilding project, a new sacristy was built and the church porch with a new coatroom and bathroom, as well as adding a small kitchen on the second floor. The church was re-opened on 27 July 1966.

== See also ==
- List of churches in Bjørgvin
