= Norm Macdonald (disambiguation) =

Norm Macdonald (1959–2021) was a Canadian comedian and actor.

Norm Macdonald, or similar, may also refer to:

- Norm McDonald (footballer, born 1898) (1898–1976), Australian rules footballer for Footscray
- Norm McDonald (footballer, born 1925) (1925–2002), Australian rules footballer for Essendon
- Norm Macdonald (politician), Canadian politician
- Norman McDonald's Country Drive-Inn, restaurant in Philpot, Kentucky, U.S.
