= Askvoll (village) =

Village in Askvoll Municipality, Norway

- Village
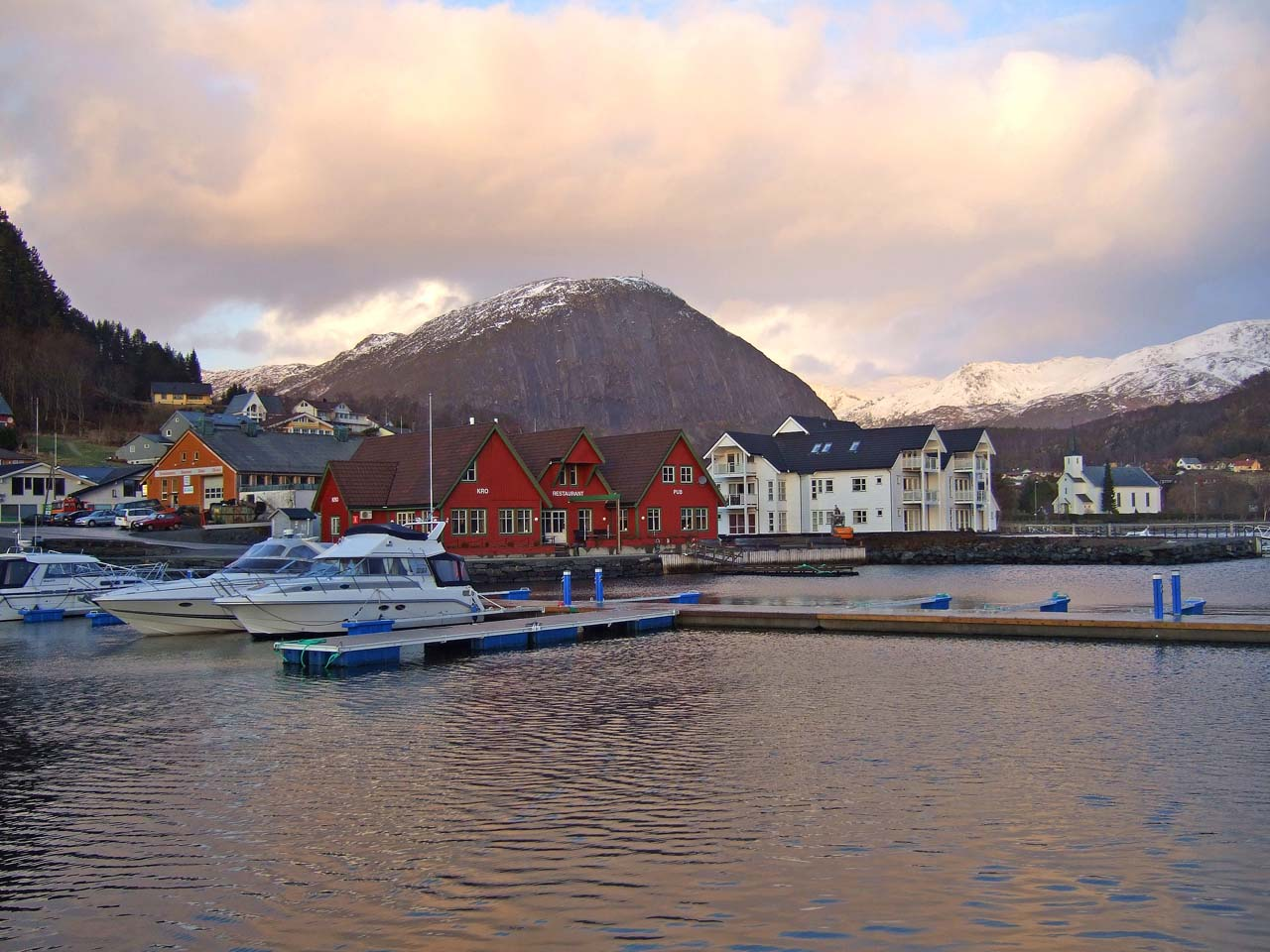
- View of the village
- Interactive map of Askvoll
- Location within Vestland Location within Norway
- Coordinates: 61.34673°N 5.06224°E
- Country: Norway
- Region: Western Norway
- County: Vestland
- District: Sunnfjord
- Municipality: Askvoll Municipality

Area
  - Total: 0.72 km^{2} (0.28 sq mi)
- Elevation: 4 m (13 ft)

Population (2025)
  - Total: 717
  - Density: 996/km^{2} (2,580/sq mi)
- Time zone: UTC+01:00 (CET)
  - Summer (DST): UTC+02:00 (CEST)
- Post Code: 6980 Askvoll

Askvoll is the administrative centre of Askvoll Municipality in Vestland county, Norway. The village is located on the western coast of the mainland, just north of the mouth of the Dalsfjorden in the Sunnfjord region of the county. The village lies about 6 kilometres (3.7 mi) west of the village of Holmedal and about 15 kilometres (9.3 mi) south of the village of Stongfjorden. The island of Atløyna lies a couple kilometres west of the village of Askvoll.

The 0.72-square-kilometre (180-acre) village has a population (2025) of 717 and a population density of 996 inhabitants per square kilometre (2,580/sq mi).

Askvoll village is the site of the municipal administration as well as a primary and secondary school. The local police office, dental care, nursing care, and veterinary care are all located here. The village also features various shops, hotels, banks, and pharmacies. Askvoll Church, built in 1863, is located in the village. Askvoll has been a church site since the Middle Ages.

The village has regular ferry connections to Fure (across the Dalsfjorden), to the island of Atløyna, and to the Værlandet-Bulandet islands.
