= Dalsfjorden (Sunnfjord) =

Fjord in Vestland county, Norway

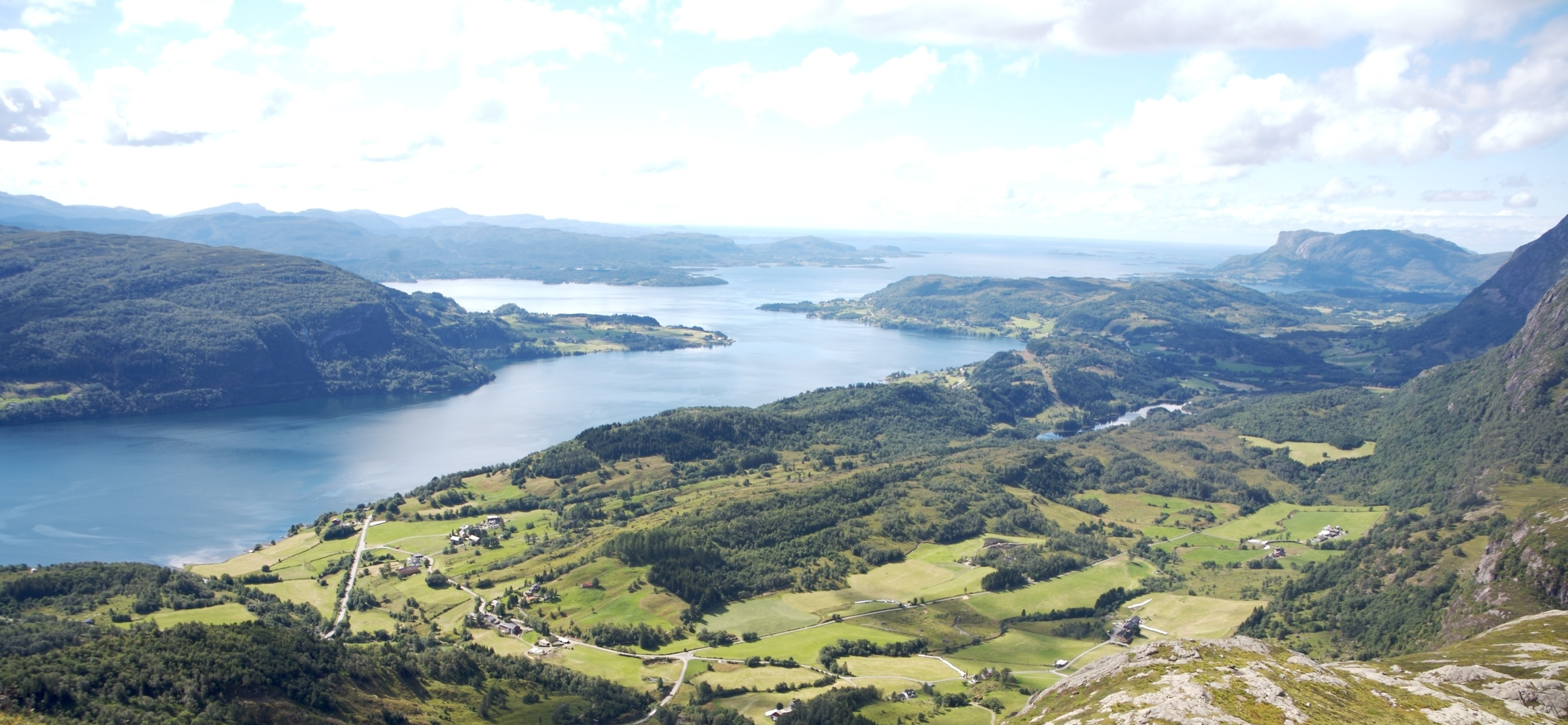
- View of the fjord from Rivedal, looking west
- Interactive map of the fjord
- Location: Sunnfjord, Vestland
- Coordinates: 61.3523°N 5.2081°E
- Primary inflows: Gaula
- Primary outflows: North Sea
- Basin countries: Norway
- Max. length: 40 kilometres (25 mi)
- Max. width: 3.5 kilometres (2.2 mi)
- Settlements: Bygstad, Dale, Holmedal

Dalsfjorden is a fjord in Vestland county, Norway. It is located in the municipalities of Askvoll, Fjaler, and Sunnfjord. It is one of the two main fjords that comprise the Sunnfjord region of the county. The fjord is about 40 kilometres (25 mi) long and it is generally about 0.5 to 1 kilometre (0.31 to 0.62 mi) wide.

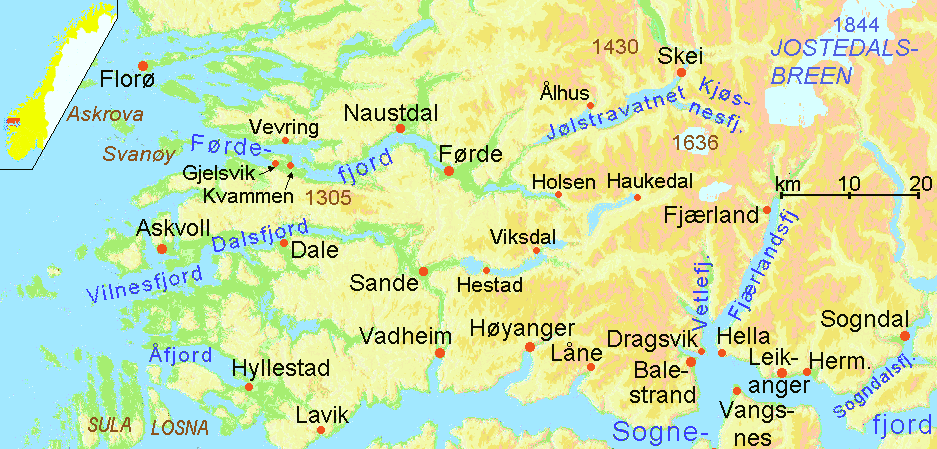
Map

The Dalsfjorden is a narrow fjord that cuts into roughly eastwards from the village of Vilnes on the island of Atløyna in Askvoll Municipality. The outer part of the fjord is also known as the Vilnesfjorden. The mouth of the fjord by Vilnes has a width of approximately 3.5 kilometres (2.2 mi), but at the village of Holmedal the fjord narrows quite a bit. The rest of the fjord going east has a width of 0.5 to 1 kilometre (0.31 to 0.62 mi). The mouth of the river Gaula is located at the innermost part of the fjord. On the south side of the fjord lies the village of Dale, the administrative centre of Fjaler Municipality.

There is one ferry operated by Fjord1 Nordvestlandske travelling the Askvoll-Gjervik-Fure route on the western end of the fjord. The Dalsfjord Bridge, connecting Dale and Askvoll, opened in December 2013.

== See also ==
- List of Norwegian fjords
