= Atløyna =

Island in Vestland, Norway

Atløyna Atløy
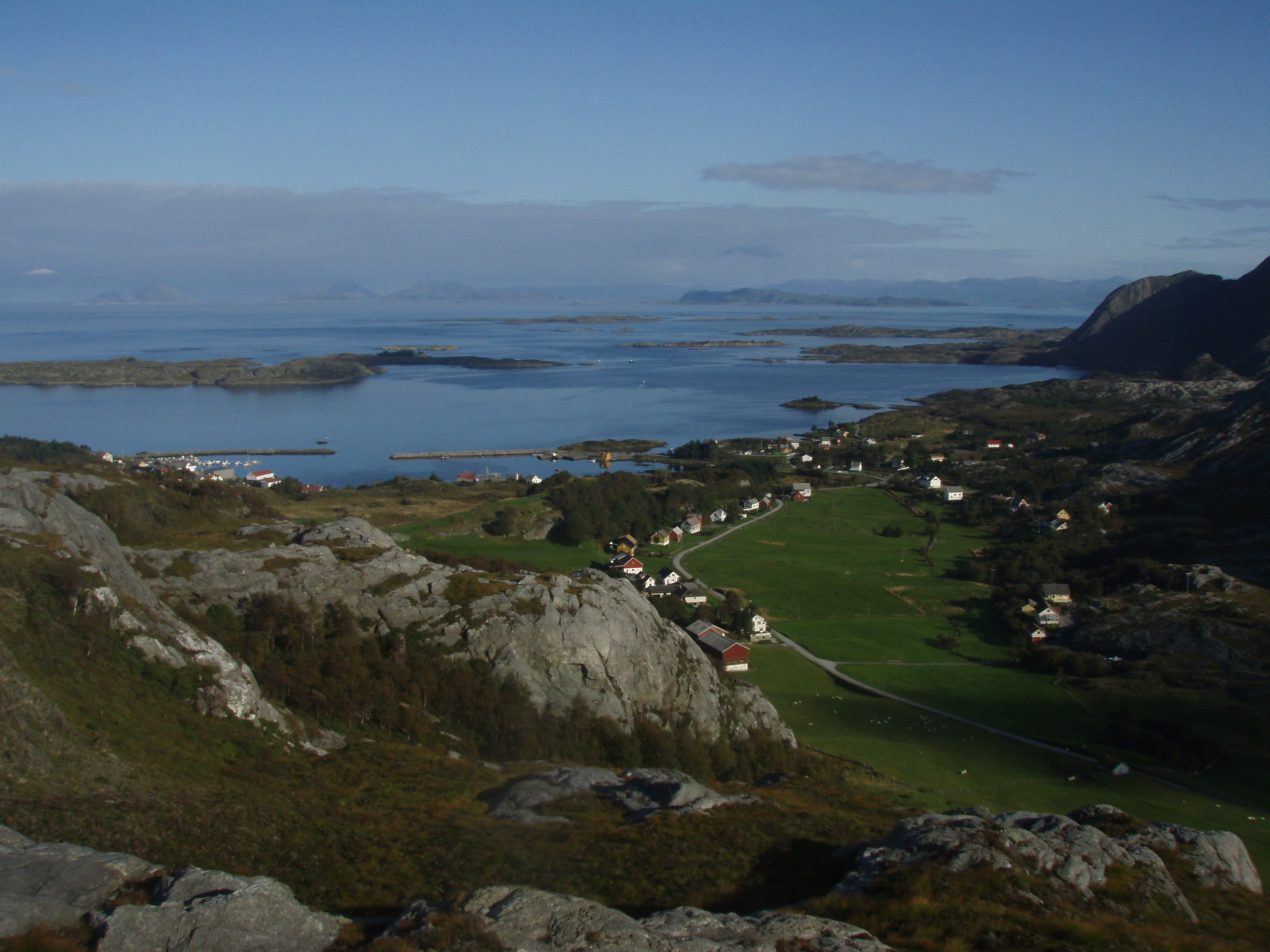
- View of the island
- Interactive map of Atløyna; Atløy

Geography
- Location: Vestland, Norway
- Coordinates: 61.3333°N 4.9677°E
- Area: 37.7 km^{2} (14.6 sq mi)
- Length: 8 km (5 mi)
- Width: 7.8 km (4.85 mi)
- Highest elevation: 636 m (2087 ft)
- Highest point: Skredvarden

Administration
- Norway
- County: Vestland
- Municipality: Askvoll Municipality

Demographics
- Population: 480 (2001)

Atløyna is an island in Askvoll Municipality in Vestland county, Norway. In 2001, there were 480 residents on the island.

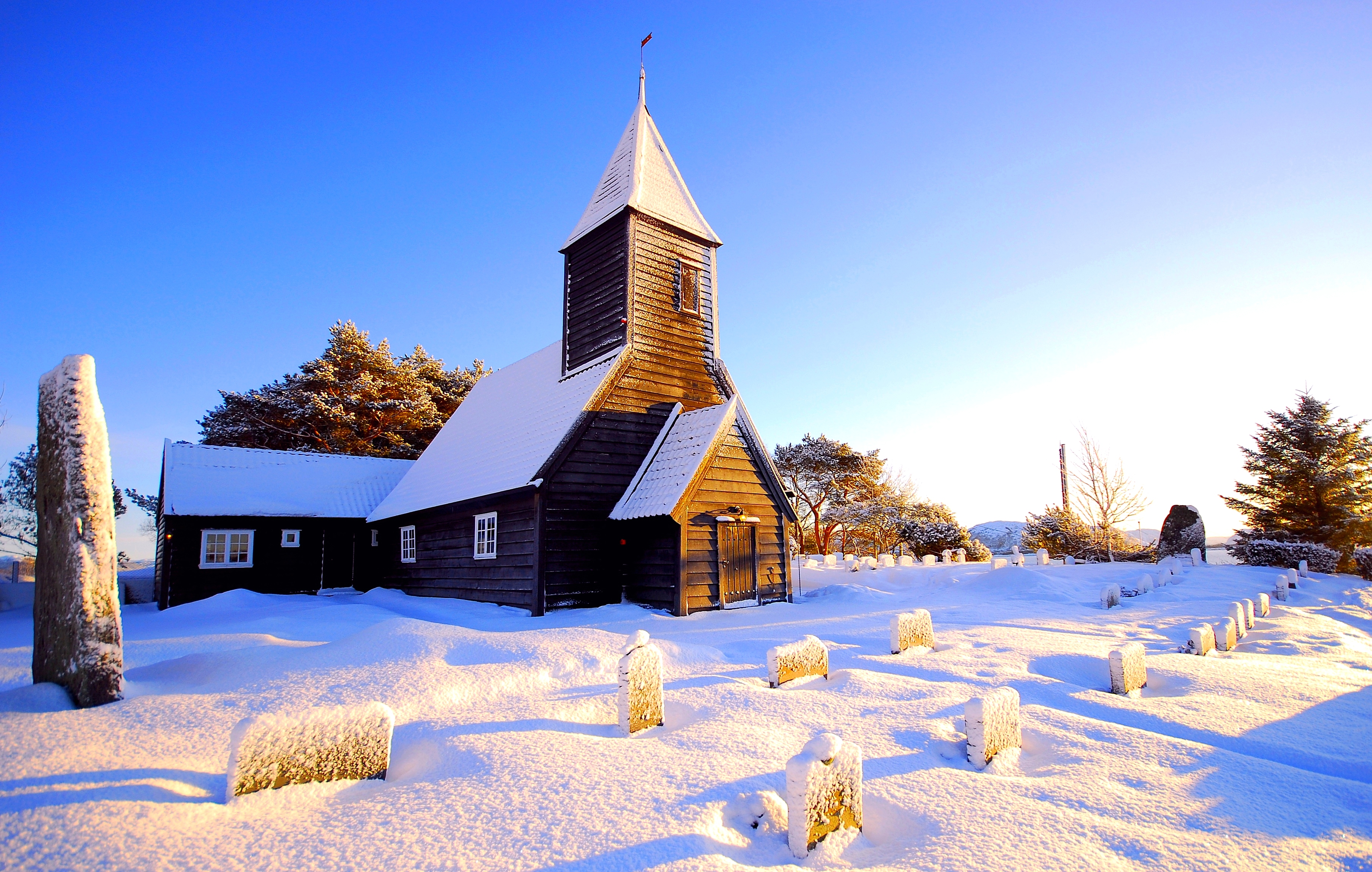
Vilnes Church

The island lies about 700 metres (2,300 ft) west of the mainland coast, just west of the village of Askvoll on the mainland. The 37.7-square-kilometre (14.6 sq mi) island has no road connections to the mainland, but there is a regular ferry route. Most of the inhabitants on the island live right along the coast. The largest population centres on the island are Vilnes on the southwestern coast, Sauesund on the southeastern coast, and Hærland on the northwestern coast.

Vilnes Church (Vilnes kyrkje) is a medieval wooden church located in the village of Vilnes. It was constructed in 1674 and has a seating capacity of 130. The church was built following plans drawn by architects Johan and Claus Lindstrøm. Restoration was carried out during the 1950s.

== See also ==
- List of islands of Norway
