= Sunnfjord =

- District
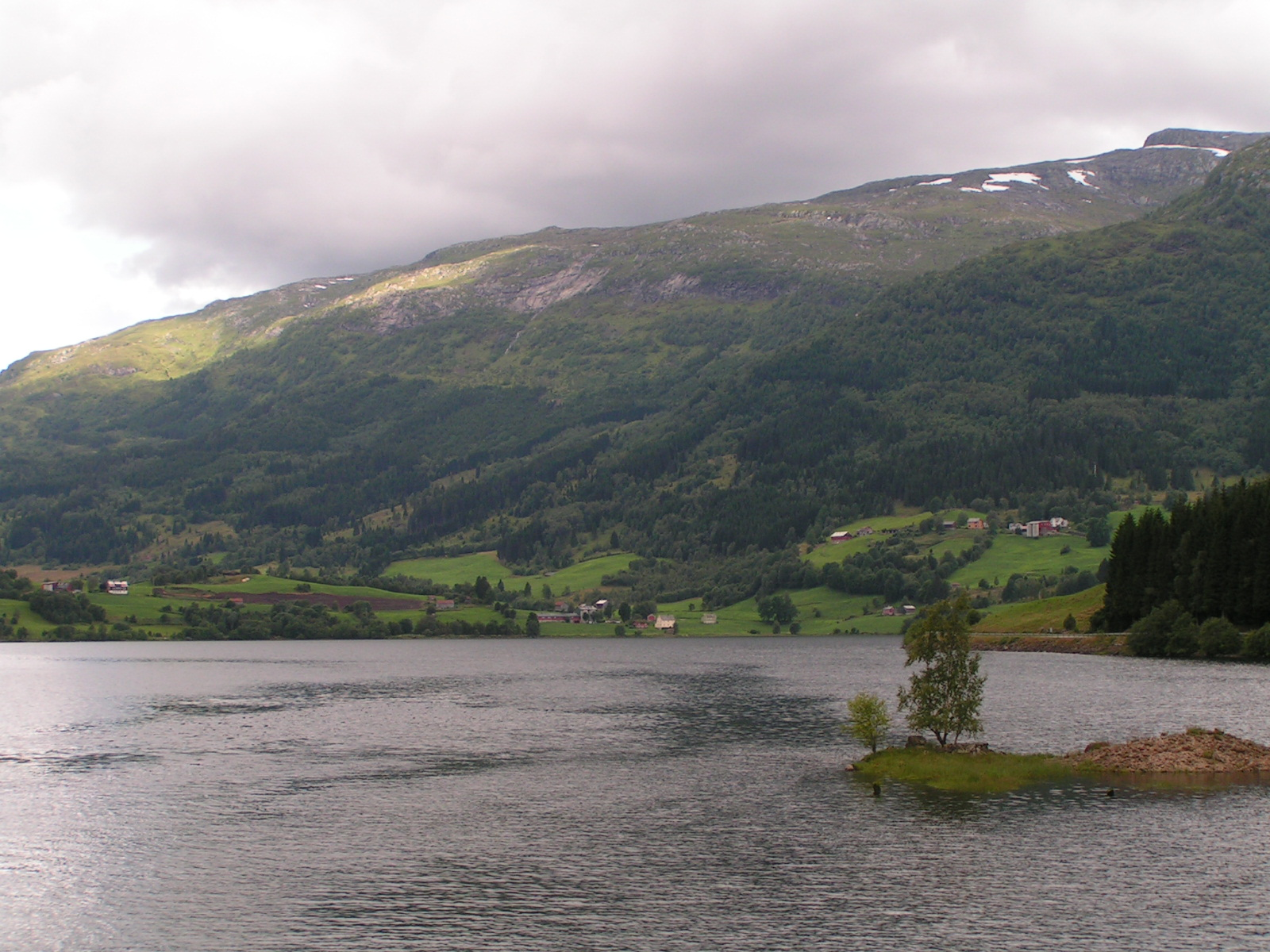
- View of Viksdalsvatnet

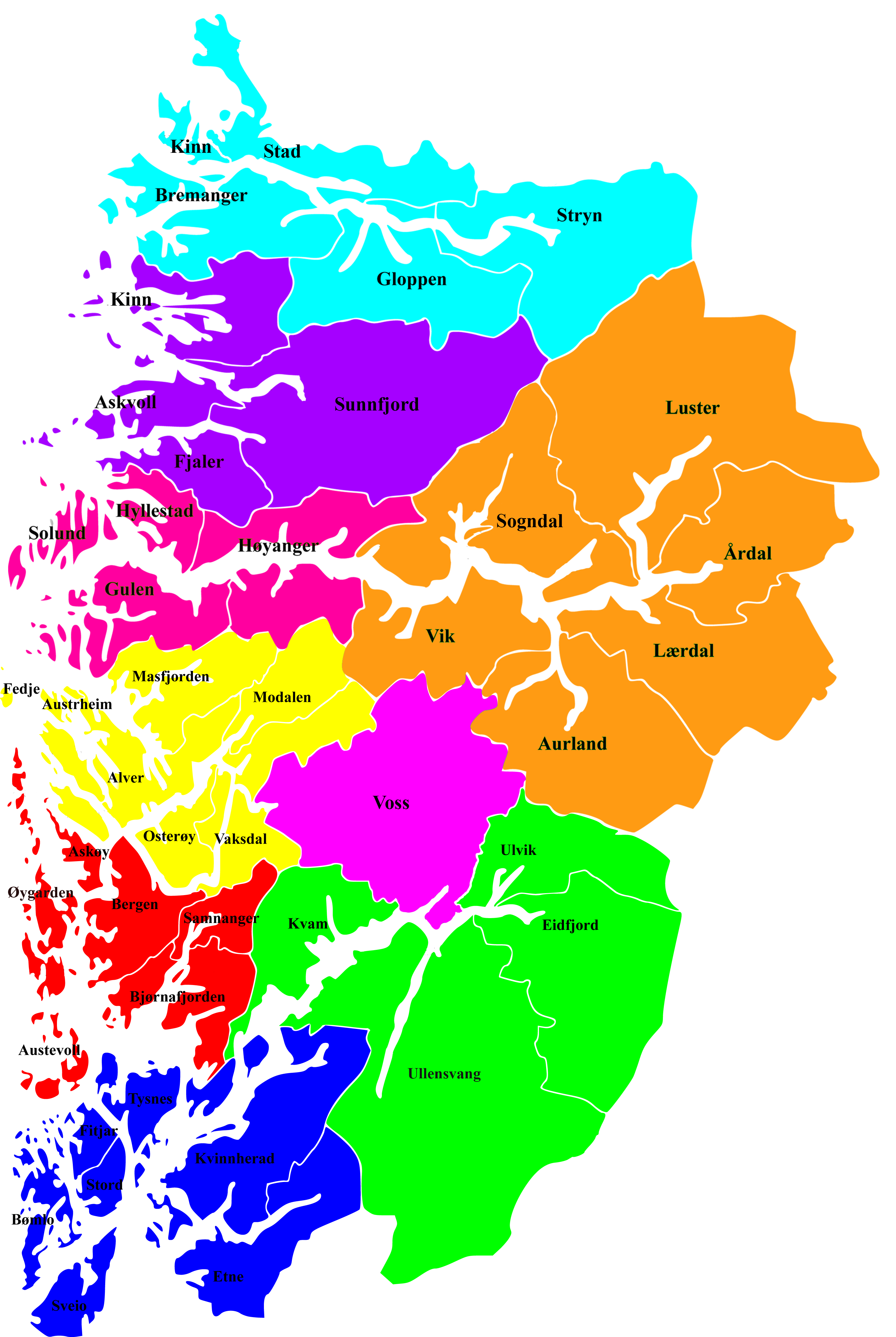
- Districts of Vestland: Nordfjord Sunnfjord Inner Sogn Outer Sogn Nordhordland Midthordland Sunnhordland Hardanger Voss
- Coordinates: 61.4930°N 5.5404°E
- Country: Norway
- County: Vestland
- Region: Western Norway

Area
  - Total: 4,476 km^{2} (1,728 sq mi)

Population (2016)
  - Total: 43,324
  - Density: 9.679/km^{2} (25.07/sq mi)
- Demonym: Sunnfjording

Sunnfjord (English: the southern fjord - in contrast to Nordfjord) is a traditional district in Western Norway located in Vestland county. It includes the municipalities of Askvoll, Fjaler, the southernmost parts of Kinn, Sunnfjord, and the southernmost parts of Bremanger. It covers an area of about 4,476 square kilometres (1,728 sq mi) and has a population (2016) of 43,324—about 8% of the population of Vestland county.

Historical population
Year	1769	1951	1960	1970	1980	1990	2000	2010	2016
Pop.	11,545	26,271	26,368	27,153	31,299	33,511	36,591	40,238	43,324
±%	—	+127.6%	+0.4%	+3.0%	+15.3%	+7.1%	+9.2%	+10.0%	+7.7%
Source: Statistics Norway.

The central geographical characteristic of the Sunnfjord region are the fjords: Dalsfjorden and Førdefjorden. It is a tourist region, with waterfalls, fishing, white-water rafting, glaciers, hiking, and scenery—including Jostedalsbreen National Park.

The area was the site of the largest air battle over Norway during World War II, and a museum is dedicated to the event in Naustdal. There are two airports in Sunnfjord: Førde Airport, Bringeland, just outside the town of Førde, and Florø Airport, just outside the town of Florø. The European route E39 highway passes through the region, going north and south.
