= MTB 345 =

History

Norway
- Name: MTB 345
- Builder: John I. Thornycroft & Company in Southampton, England
- Launched: 1941
- Acquired: from the Royal Navy 16 March 1943
- Commissioned: 5 May 1943
- Captured: by the Germans 27 July 1943

Service record
- Part of: 12th Motor Torpedo Boat Flotilla (January 1942–?); 30th Motor Torpedo Boat Flotilla; (5 May 1943 – 28 July 1943)
- Commanders: Temporary Sub-lieutenant D. Mortimer (RNVR) (January 1942–?); Lieutenant Alv Haldor Andresen (16 March 1943 – 28 July 1943)
- Operations: Two operations against the coast of occupied Norway
- Victories: One Blohm & Voss BV 138 flying boat damaged

Nazi Germany
- Name: SA 12
- Acquired: 28 July 1943
- Fate: Still exist on 12 December 1943, fate unknown

General characteristics
- Class & type: Experimental Thornycroft motor torpedo boat
- Displacement: 16.05 tons
- Length: 55 feet (16.76 m)
- Beam: 11 feet (3.35 m)
- Propulsion: 2 × Thornycroft RY/12 petrol engines with a total of 1,326 brake horsepower
- Speed: 41 knots (75.93 km/h; 47.18 mph)
- Complement: 7 officers and men
- Armament: 1 × twin 0.303 Lewis machine guns; 2 × 18 inch torpedo tubes; 2 × depth charges

MTB 345 was an experimental motor torpedo boat constructed in 1941, which saw limited service with the Royal Navy before being transferred to the exiled Royal Norwegian Navy on 16 March 1943. She sailed with the Royal Norwegian Navy for three months in 1943, until captured by German forces on 28 July 1943, during her second mission to the coast of occupied Norway. Two days after their capture, the crew of MTB 345 were executed by the Germans based on Hitler's Commando Order. Following their capture of MTB 345, the Germans pressed the motor torpedo boat into Kriegsmarine service, renaming her SA 12. The fate of SA 12 since December 1943 is unknown.

After the end of the Second World War, the British Admiralty investigated the Commando Order killings in Norway, and sought out German officers suspected of involvement. In a war crimes trial, Generaloberst (Colonel General) Nikolaus von Falkenhorst was sentenced to death for his role in the Commando Order executions that occurred in Norway during the occupation, including the killing of MTB 345's crew. Sicherheitsdienst (Security Service, SD) commander Hans Wilhelm Blomberg was executed in January 1946 for his role in the killing, while Admiral Otto von Schrader committed suicide in Norwegian custody in July 1945 before he could be brought to trial.

== Background ==
Following the German invasion of Norway on 9 April 1940, and the subsequent 62-day Norwegian campaign that ended in June 1940 with the German conquest of the country, the Royal Norwegian Navy was exiled in the United Kingdom. One way the exiled Norwegian forces attempted to strike back was by motor torpedo boat attacks on German-controlled shipping. After initial operations in the English Channel from July 1940 onwards, operations against the coast of occupied Norway from the Shetland Islands began in November 1942 and continued throughout the war in Europe. In total 30 motor torpedo boats served in the Royal Norwegian Navy during the war years.

== Acquisition ==
MTB 345 was one of three coastal motor torpedo boats designed and built as an experiment by John I. Thornycroft & Company in Southampton, England, the other two being MTB 344 and MTB 346. Originally, the three MTBs had been intended to be transported to their operating areas on board larger ships, a concept which was never carried out. MTB 345 was launched in 1941 and completed on 22 November of that year. She had a displacement of 16.05 tons, a length of 55 feet (16.76 m) and a beam of 11 feet (3.35 m). Her two Thornycroft RY/12 1,326 brake horsepower petrol engines could propel her at 41 kn (76 km/h; 47 mph). She was armed with twin Lewis machine guns, two 18-inch torpedo tubes and two depth charges.

Initially intended for service with the British Royal Navy, MTB 345 in January 1942 formed part of the 12th Motor Torpedo Boat Flotilla, being set up at Dartmouth, England. After working up, the flotilla was to be laid up at Portsmouth, England. At the time she was under the command of Temporary Sub-lieutenant D. Mortimer of the Royal Naval Volunteer Reserve.

MTB 345 was acquired by the exiled Royal Norwegian Navy from the Royal Navy on 16 March 1943, as part of a plan to increase attacks on German and German-controlled shipping off the coast of Norway by expanding operations during the summer months. Most of the attacks up until that point had occurred under the cover of darkness, a tactic which prohibited attacks during the round-the-clock light of the Norwegian summer. The sinking of the escorted German iron ore carrier Altenfels by MTB 626 on 5 June 1943 had demonstrated the feasibility of summer operations on the coast of Norway.

MTB 345 was transported from Weymouth in England to Inverness in Scotland by train, and was relaunched on 24 April 1943. The motor torpedo boat was ready for operations on 5 May and arrived at the Norwegian naval base at Lerwick in the Shetland Islands on 6 May. The vessel's commander was Lieutenant Alv Haldor Andresen, who was also the initiator of the experiment with light motor torpedo boats on the coast of Norway. MTB 345 formed part of 30th Motor Torpedo Boat Flotilla.

MTB 345 was a small vessel, and as such considered to be well suited for operations on the coast of occupied Norway. Subterfuge was seen as essential for the success of motor torpedo boat missions off Norway, and the summer light made hiding from German observers much harder. To be able to operate against shipping off Norway, MTB 345 had to be resupplied by other, larger vessels. MTB 345 was a fast vessel, being capable of a top speed of 41 knots (75.93 km/h; 47.18 mph). Her secondary, silent electric engine could propel her at 6 knots (11.11 km/h; 6.90 mph). The main problem with MTB 345 was her very short range, requiring refuelling during operations.

== First operation ==
MTB 345 set sail from Lerwick on her first operation on 9 June 1943. She was accompanied by MTB 653, which carried fuel and provisions for the operation.

In the evening, as the two motor torpedo boats approached the Norwegian coast, the boats encountered dense fog and lost contact with each other. MTB 653 turned back to the Shetland Islands after reaching a section of the Norwegian coast that was well guarded by the Germans, with the intention of making a renewed attempt the next day.

On her part, MTB 345 made landfall near Utvær Lighthouse around 02:00 on 10 June and anchored up at 03:30. The next night MTB 345 continued the journey along the coast, before reaching the supply rendezvous point at Sula. MTB 653 reached the point shortly thereafter. In addition to bringing supplies, MTB 653 also brought a secret agent who was on a spy mission in the area. After 12 days and nights of uneventful patrolling and hiding along the coast, MTB 345 made her way back to Lerwick in the early hours of 23 June, by way of Sognesjøen.

Following the mission, Lieutenant Andresen stated that MTB 345 was a good boat for summer missions, but not in extreme weather conditions. She was a fast vessel, with a very small silhouette. He also concluded that the vessel could not be used outside the summer season. The vessel could also easily be hidden along the shore under camouflage netting, although there was insufficient accommodation on board and the crew would have to camp on land during longer missions. Andresen and his crew were praised for their resilience by their commanding officer Captain Thore Horve, in reports to Admiral Lionel Victor Wells.

== Second operation and capture ==
At 13:30 on 24 July MTB 345 embarked on her second mission to Norway in the company of the three larger motor torpedo boats MTB 619, MTB 620 and MTB 623. The force split up on the way to Norway. MTB 345 and MTB 620 spotted Utvær Lighthouse at 23:50 and made landfall further south at around 24:00, with MTB 345 being refuelled by MTB 620.

During the refuelling process, the two vessels were spotted by a German Blohm & Voss BV 138 flying boat. Both motor torpedo boats opened fire at the aircraft, inflicting damage before the aircraft disappeared over the horizon. Having been spotted by the Germans, Lieutenant Andresen ordered the junior commander of MTB 620 to return to the Shetland Islands at once, while MTB 345 hid near Utvær.

Of primary importance for MTB 345 was the acquisition of more fuel from hidden depots along the coast. When MTB 345 reached a depot at the island of Ospa near Bergen, she was hidden under camouflage netting. The fuel at Ospa proved to be of the wrong type for MTB 345's engines, leaving the motor torpedo boat without enough fuel for operations or a return to the Shetland Islands. MTB 345 remained at Ospa waiting for a solution to the fuel situation.

The motor torpedo boat was soon spotted by the locals of the area, and eventually the Germans got word of the presence of MTB 345. On 28 July, seven German warships arrived on the scene, surrounding MTB 345's anchorage. The Luftwaffe provided air cover for the operation against MTB 345 from Herdla air base. Admiral Otto von Schrader was in overall command of the German forces.

As the German ships approached the anchorage, the crew of MTB 345 set their vessel on fire and readied a depth charge to scuttle her. Before the depth charge could be detonated, MTB 345 was boarded by soldiers from the German patrol boat RA 202. In the ensuing gunfight, three of the crew members on MTB 345 were wounded. Following their capture, the seven crew members of MTB 345 were taken to the German regional headquarters at Bergenhus Fortress in Bergen and imprisoned.

=== Fate of the crew and the vessel ===
After arriving at Bergenhus Fortress, the crew of MTB 345 were interrogated by Kriegsmarine personnel. The captured crew consisted of six Norwegians and one British serviceman, the latter a radio telegraphist. At 05:00 on 29 July the crew members were handed over to the SD on the order of Admiral von Schrader, who described the prisoners as "pirates, not soldiers". Admiral von Schrader demanded that the prisoners be executed according to Hitler's Commando Order, regarding the killing of captured commandos and uniformed saboteurs. The overall German commander in Norway, Generaloberst Nikolaus von Falkenhorst had stipulated that such prisoners were to be handed over to the SD and shot within 12 hours of capture. The SD commander in Norway, Heinrich Fehlis, confirmed the execution order.

The prisoners from MTB 345 were initially brought to Ulven army camp in Bergen, where they were subjected to torture. Early in the morning of 30 July 1943 the seven prisoners were shot dead at the camp. In the late evening the same day the coffins containing the bodies of the seven executed crew members were lowered into the water in Krossfjorden and blown up with explosives.

MTB 345 was towed to Askvoll after her capture, and later taken over by the German Kriegsmarine and renamed SA 12. The boat was given in December 1943 to Gruppe Nord/Flotte. Its later fate is unknown.

Of eight Norwegian motor torpedo boats lost during the Second World War, MTB 345 was the only one lost to direct enemy action. The seven other MTBs were lost to accidents, bad weather or written off due to battle damage.

=== Attempted search for MTB 345 ===
After the disappearance of MTB 345, attempts were made by the Norwegian naval station at Lerwick to find the lost motor torpedo boat and crew. On 28 October 1943 the commander of the Shetland unit, Lieutenant Commander Helge Øi requested permission to carry out a search for the crew on Ospa. The request was denied by Admiral Wells. Following the experiment with MTB 345, no further attempts were made to operate small, non self-sufficient warships on the coast of occupied Norway.

== Aftermath ==
After the Second World War the case of MTB 345 was treated in several war crimes trials. Following investigation by the British Admiralty, nine SD personnel were put on trial in Oslo, Norway. The British military court in Oslo sentenced the SD commander in Bergen, who had carried out the executions, Obersturmbannführer (Lieutenant Colonel) Hans Wilhelm Blomberg, to death on 26 December 1945. Blomberg was executed on 10 January 1946. Of the remaining eight defendants, two were acquitted and the other six given prison sentences.

Generaloberst von Falkenhorst, who had testified for the defence at the Oslo trial, was convicted and sentenced to death on 2 August 1946 by a British Military Court in Brunswick, Germany, for his role in the implementation of the Commando Order. The sentence was later commuted to 20 years of imprisonment. The MTB 345 killings was the eighth of a total of nine charges against the general, of which one charge was dropped and another led to an acquittal. (Note: Amongst the other Commando Order executions which von Falkenhorst was convicted of were the shooting of seven British commandos captured during Operation Musketoon in September 1942, the killing in January 1943 of five British commandos captured after Operation Freshman, the execution of a British sailor involved in an attack on the German battleship Tirpitz and the shooting of eight members of the Norwegian Independent Company 1.) Admiral von Schrader committed suicide by firearm on 19 July 1945 while imprisoned in Bergen.

== Memorials ==
A memorial to the crew of MTB 345 was raised at the present-day Ulven naval station in Bergen in 1965, where an annual wreath-laying ceremony takes place.

On the 60th anniversary of the capture of MTB 345, 28 July 2003, a memorial was unveiled on Ospa by Marit Nybakk, who was then a Member of Parliament and the Standing Committee on Defence. The installation of the memorial was organized by Solund Municipality.
