= Utvær (disambiguation) =

Utvær is an island group in Solund Municipality, Vestland County, Norway.

Utvær may also refer to:

- HNoMS Utvær, the name of several submarines of the Royal Norwegian Navy
- Utvær Chapel, former church at the site of Husøy Church
- Utvær Lighthouse, the westernmost lighthouse in Norway
- Utvær Municipality, former name of Solund Municipality
