= Kolgrov =

Village in Solund Municipality, Norway

- Village
- Interactive map of Kolgrov
- Location within Vestland Location within Norway
- Coordinates: 61.00697°N 4.67047°E
- Country: Norway
- Region: Western Norway
- County: Vestland
- District: Sogn
- Municipality: Solund Municipality
- Elevation: 7 m (23 ft)
- Time zone: UTC+01:00 (CET)
  - Summer (DST): UTC+02:00 (CEST)
- Post Code: 6928 Kolgrov

Kolgrov is a village in Solund Municipality in Vestland county, Norway. The village is located on the western coast of the island of Ytre Sula, and it is one of the largest population centres on the island. The village sits about 12 kilometres (7.5 mi) directly southwest of the municipal centre of Hardbakke and about 15 kilometres (9.3 mi) northwest of the village of Byrknes in Gulen Municipality (across the Sognesjøen).

Husøy Church is located on the north side of Kolgrov. Historically, the church was located on the island of Utvær until 1719. It was then moved to the small island of Husøy (just off the coast of Kolgrov). In 1896, the church was moved to its present site.
