= Solund =

Solund may refer to:

== Places ==
- Solund Municipality, a municipality in Vestland county, Norway
- Solund Church, a church in Solund Municipality in Vestland county, Norway
- Solund Basin, a geologic formation in Vestland county, Norway
- Solund Island, also known as Sula, an island in Solund Municipality in Vestland county, Norway
