= Losna (island) =

Island in Solund, Norway

- Interactive map of Losna

Geography
- Location: Vestland, Norway
- Coordinates: 61.1332°N 5.0663°E
- Area: 15.3 km^{2} (5.9 sq mi)
- Length: 7.2 km (4.47 mi)
- Width: 3.6 km (2.24 mi)
- Highest elevation: 451 m (1480 ft)
- Highest point: Meinova

Administration
- Norway
- County: Vestland
- Municipality: Solund Municipality

Demographics
- Population: 4 (2001)

Losna is an island in Solund Municipality in Vestland county, Norway. The 15.3-square-kilometre (5.9 sq mi) island lies at the mouth of the Sognefjorden, on the north side of the Sognesjøen. The Tollesundet strait lies between the island and the mainland of Hyllestad Municipality to the east and the Krakhellasundet strait lies between the island and the nearby island of Sula to the west. The island of Sula sits only about 600 metres (2,000 ft) to the west. The highest point on the very rocky island is the 451-metre (1,480 ft) tall mountain Meinova on the northern end of the island.

The island's residents all live on the southeastern side of the island, in and around the small village of Losnegard. The only access to the island is by boat, and there are ferry routes from Rutledal to the south in Gulen Municipality and to the village of Krakhella on the island of Sula to the west.

== History ==
The island was part of Gulen Municipality until 1964 when it was administratively transferred to Solund Municipality. At the beginning of the 1900s, there were about 100 permanent residents of the island, but in 2001, there were only 4 permanent residents left.

== See also ==
- List of islands of Norway
