= Hersvikbygda =

Village in Solund Municipality, Norway

Hersvikbygda Hersvik
- Village
- Interactive map of Hersvikbygda
- Location within Vestland Location within Norway
- Coordinates: 61.17282°N 4.89656°E
- Country: Norway
- Region: Western Norway
- County: Vestland
- District: Sogn
- Municipality: Solund Municipality
- Elevation: 10 m (33 ft)
- Time zone: UTC+01:00 (CET)
  - Summer (DST): UTC+02:00 (CEST)
- Post Code: 6929 Hersvikbygda

Hersvikbygda is a village in Solund Municipality in Vestland county, Norway. The village is located on the northern shores of the island of Sula, about 20 kilometres (12 mi) north of the municipal centre of Hardbakke. The village is the site of Hersvik Church, which serves the northern part of the municipality.
