= Solund Church =

Church in Vestland, Norway

- Solund kyrkje
- Solund Church
- 61°04′32″N 4°50′22″E
- Location: Solund Municipality, Vestland
- Country: Norway
- Denomination: Church of Norway
- Churchmanship: Evangelical Lutheran

History
- Status: Parish church
- Founded: 1860
- Consecrated: 22 November 1860

Architecture
- Functional status: Active
- Architect: Christian Heinrich Grosch
- Architectural type: Long church
- Completed: 1860 (166 years ago)

Specifications
- Capacity: 200
- Materials: Wood

Administration
- Diocese: Bjørgvin bispedømme
- Deanery: Nordhordland prosti
- Parish: Solund
- Norwegian Cultural Heritage Site
- Type: Church
- Status: Not protected
- ID: 85523

Solund Church (Norwegian: Solund kyrkje) is a parish church of the Church of Norway in Solund Municipality in Vestland county, Norway. It is located in the village of Hardbakke on the western coast of the island of Sula. It is one of the three churches for the Solund parish which is part of the Nordhordland prosti (deanery) in the Diocese of Bjørgvin. The white, wooden church was built in a long church design in 1860 using plans drawn up by the architect Christian Henrik Grosch. The church seats about 200 people.

== History ==
Historically, the only church in Solund Municipality was the Utvær Chapel in the western part of the municipality. By the mid-1800s, another church was needed in Solund, so plans were made for a new church in Hardbakke, in the central part of the municipality. At that time, the church was to be built in a very rural area (after the church was built, the area became one of the largest urban areas in the municipality). The new church was designed by Christian Henrik Grosch and the lead builder was Askild Andersen Aase. It was a modest sized long church with the nave measuring 13.5 by 9.5 metres (44 ft × 31 ft) and a square choir measuring 5.5 metres (18 ft) on each side. In 1929, the walls were covered with new panelling. The church was consecrated on 22 November 1860 by the Bishop Jens Matthias Pram Kaurin. In 1959, the church was wired for electric lights and electric heating. The following year, 1960, the church was redecorated on the inside for the 100th anniversary celebrations. Bathrooms were installed in the church in 1980. A new slate roof was put on the church in 1999. From 1860 until 1 January 2000, the church was the main church for the Solund parish. On 1 January 2000, the three parishes in the municipality were merged into one large parish with three churches.

== See also ==
- List of churches in Bjørgvin
