= S303 =

S303 may refer to:

- HNoMS Utvær (S303), two Royal Norwegian Navy submarines
- Victorian Railways S class (diesel) locomotive
