= Losnegard =

Village in Solund Municipality, Norway

- Village
- Interactive map of Losnegard
- Location within Vestland Location within Norway
- Coordinates: 61.12071°N 5.09133°E
- Country: Norway
- Region: Western Norway
- County: Vestland
- District: Sogn
- Municipality: Solund Municipality
- Elevation: 18 m (59 ft)

Population (2001)
  - Total: 4
- Time zone: UTC+01:00 (CET)
  - Summer (DST): UTC+02:00 (CEST)
- Post Code: 6926 Krakhella

Losnegard is a very small village in Solund Municipality in Vestland county, Norway. Constituting the easternmost point of the municipality, it is located near the mouth of the Sognefjorden river, about 14.5 kilometres (9.0 mi) northeast of the municipal center of Hardbakke.

Losnegard is the only settlement on the island of Losna. In 2001, the population of Losnegard was 4. There is ferry service from Losnegard to Krakhella (on the nearby island of Sula) and to Rutledal on the mainland in Gulen Municipality.
