= Ytre Sula (Solund) =

Island in Solund, Norway

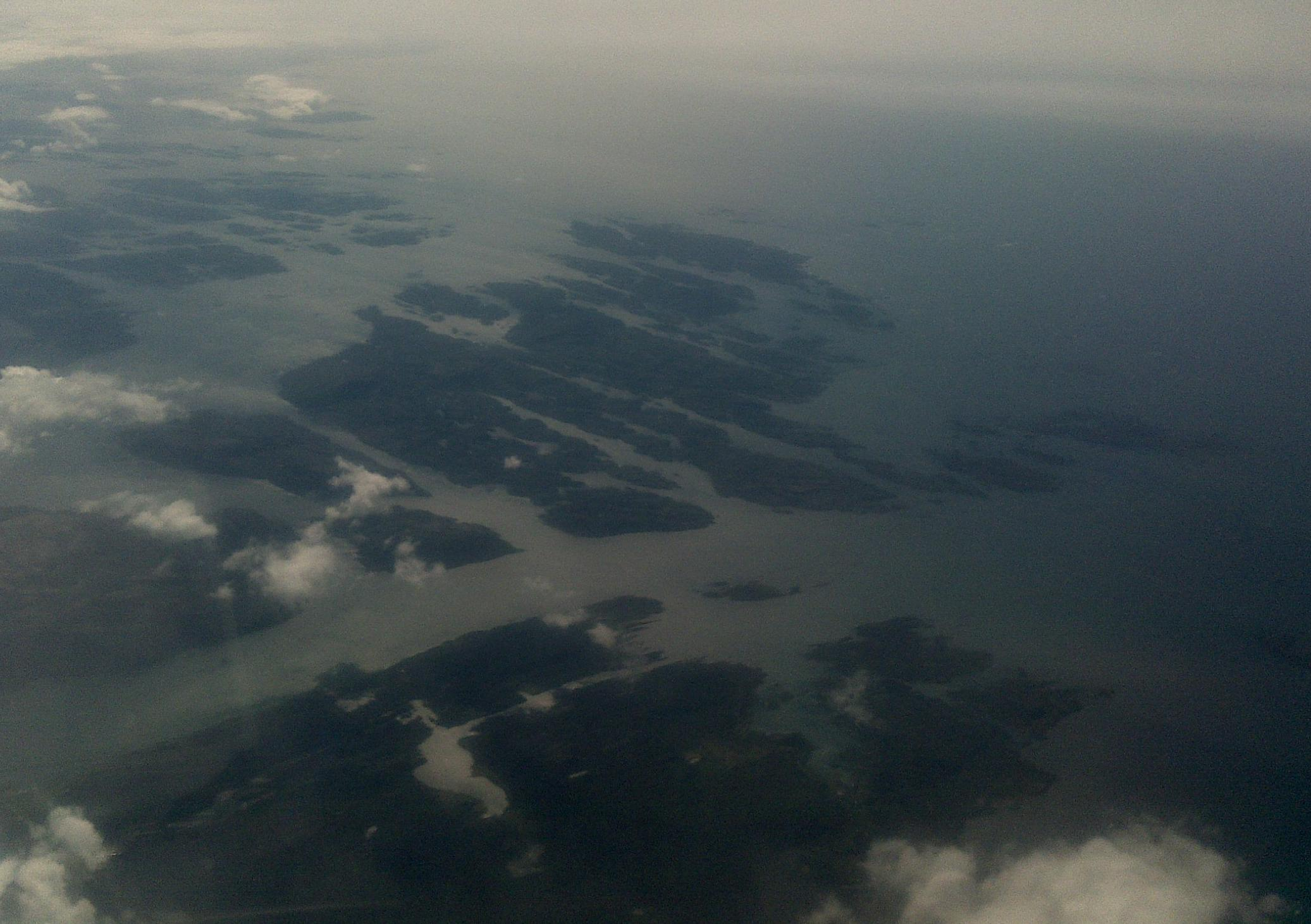
- Ytre Sula is in the top central part of the picture
- Interactive map of Ytre Sula

Geography
- Location: Vestland, Norway
- Coordinates: 61.03317°N 4.68865°E
- Area: 34.7 km^{2} (13.4 sq mi)
- Highest elevation: 202 m (663 ft)
- Highest point: Håfjellet

Administration
- Norway
- County: Vestland
- Municipality: Solund Municipality

Demographics
- Population: 240 (2001)

Ytre Sula (sometimes called Husøy) is an island in Solund Municipality in Vestland county, Norway. The island lies along the Sognesjøen, just west of the mouth of the large Sognefjorden. The 34.7-square-kilometre (13.4 sq mi) island is part of a large island group. It is the westernmost of the three main islands in Solund Municipality. The island of Steinsundøyna lies just east of Ytre Sula.

There are no road connections to the rest of Norway. To get to the mainland, one must take a ferry connection from Ytre Sula to the smaller island of Rånøyna, drive cross that island and cross a small bridge to Steinsundøyna, take a bridge from Steinsundøyna to the island of Sula, and then another ferry from Sula to Rutledal in Gulen Municipality on the mainland.

In 2001, there were about 240 residents on the island. Fishing is an important industry on the island, as is fish farming. Husøy Church is located on the west side of the island in the village of Kolgrov. Another main population centre on the island is the village of Hjønnevåg.

== See also ==
- List of islands of Norway
