= Utvær =

Island group in Solund, Norway

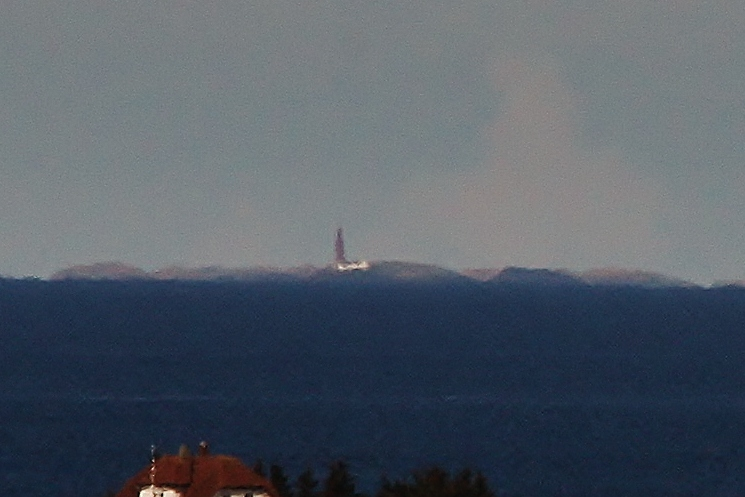
- View of the islands from Fedje
- Interactive map of Utvær

Geography
- Location: Vestland, Norway
- Coordinates: 61.0330°N 4.5044°E
- Archipelago: Utvær
- Area: 0.2 km^{2} (0.077 sq mi)
- Highest elevation: 33 m (108 ft)
- Highest point: Begla

Administration
- Norway
- County: Vestland
- Municipality: Solund Municipality

Utvær is an island group in Solund Municipality in Vestland county, Norway. It is the westernmost archipelago in Norway. The main residential area on the rocky islands is also called Utvær. It lies on the western side of the Sognesjøen which is the mouth of the vast Sognefjorden. It is about 18 kilometres (11 mi) west of the village of Hardbakke. The entire archipelago is protected as the Utvær nature reserve.

Holmebåen is the westernmost point in Norway (when you don't count Jan Mayen). It is located on the island of Steinsøy in the western part of Utvær. Utvær Lighthouse is also located in the island group.

== History ==
In 1066, King Harald Hardråde gathered his naval forces at Utvær as he prepared for an invasion of England. He took 200 naval boats plus supply boats from Utvær and its surrounding islands and sailed to the southwest towards England.

Historically, Utvær had a very robust fishing industry and in 1858, the greater Utvær area was split off from the large Eivindvig Municipality to become the new Utvær Municipality. On 1 July 1890, the municipality's name was changed to Solund Municipality. The old Utvær Chapel was historically located in Utvær as well, but it has since been moved closer to the mainland.

== Media gallery ==
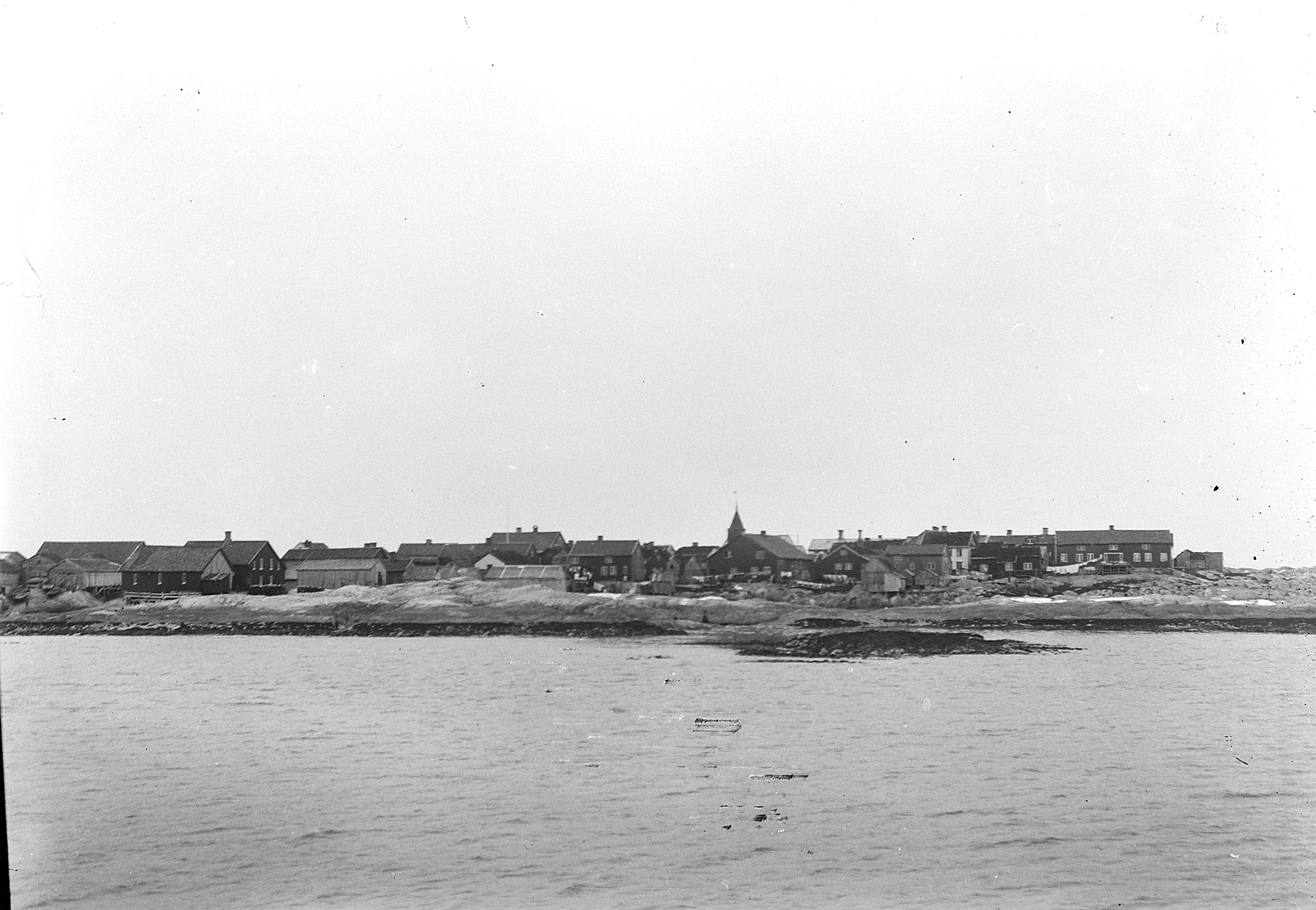

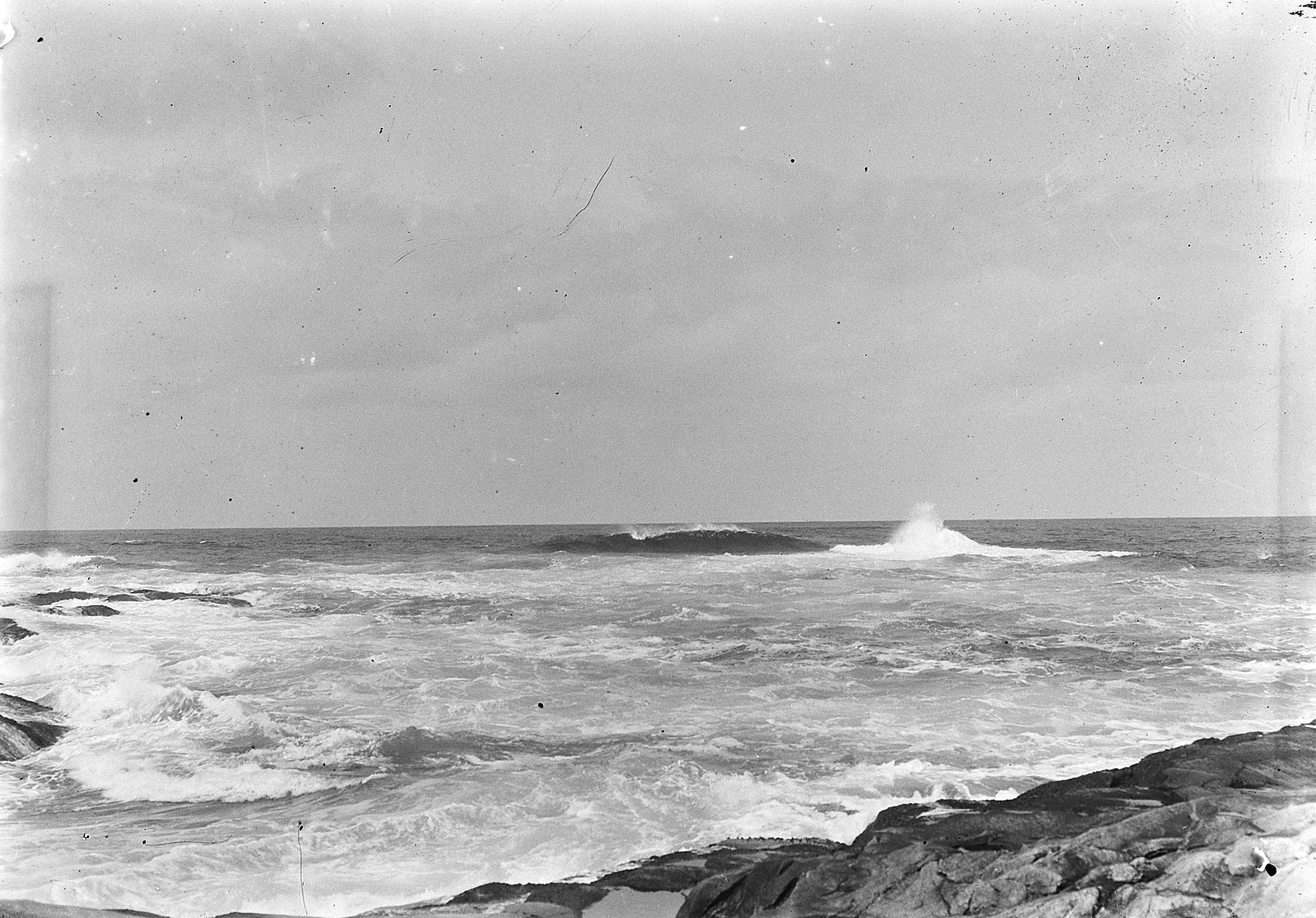

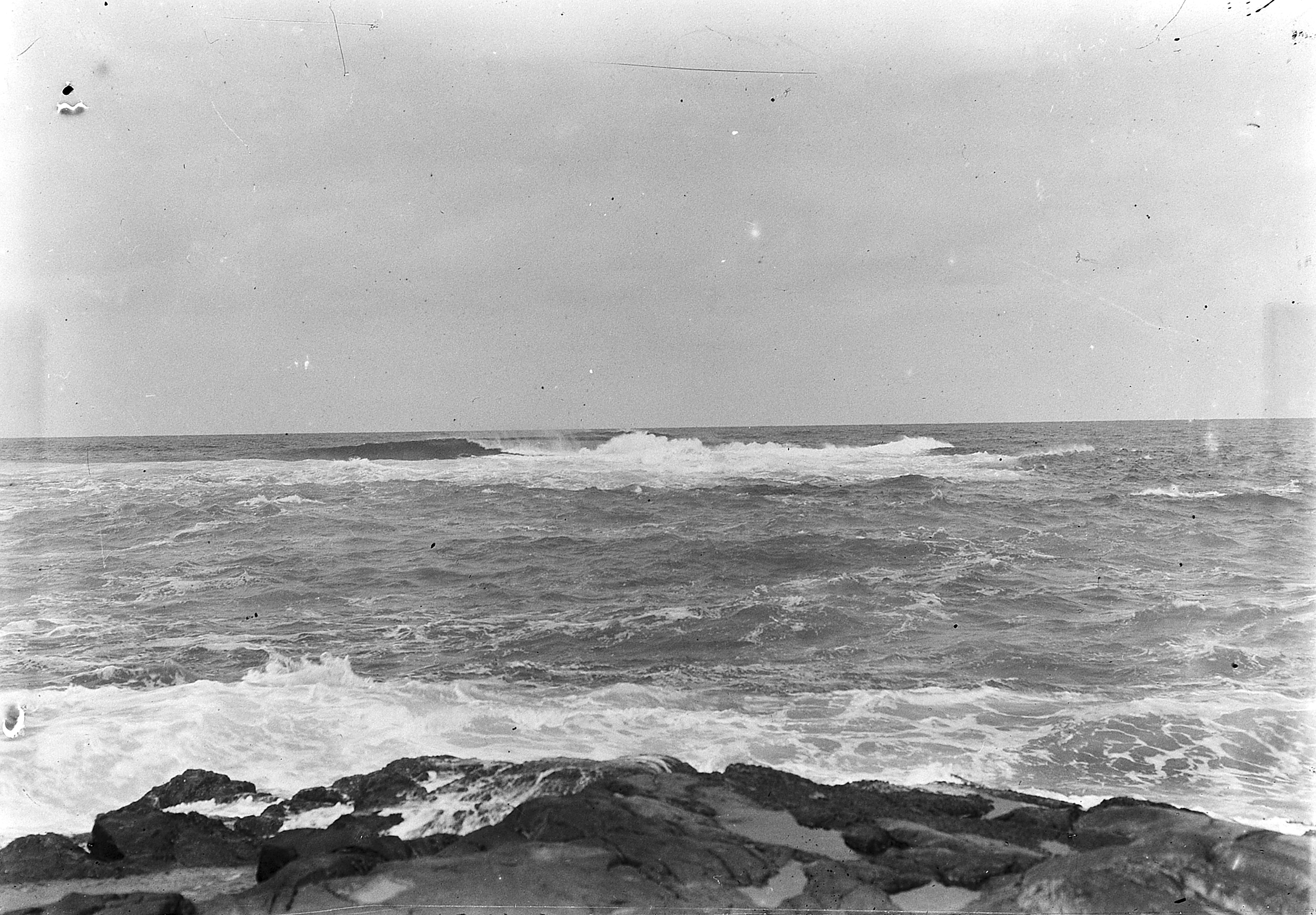

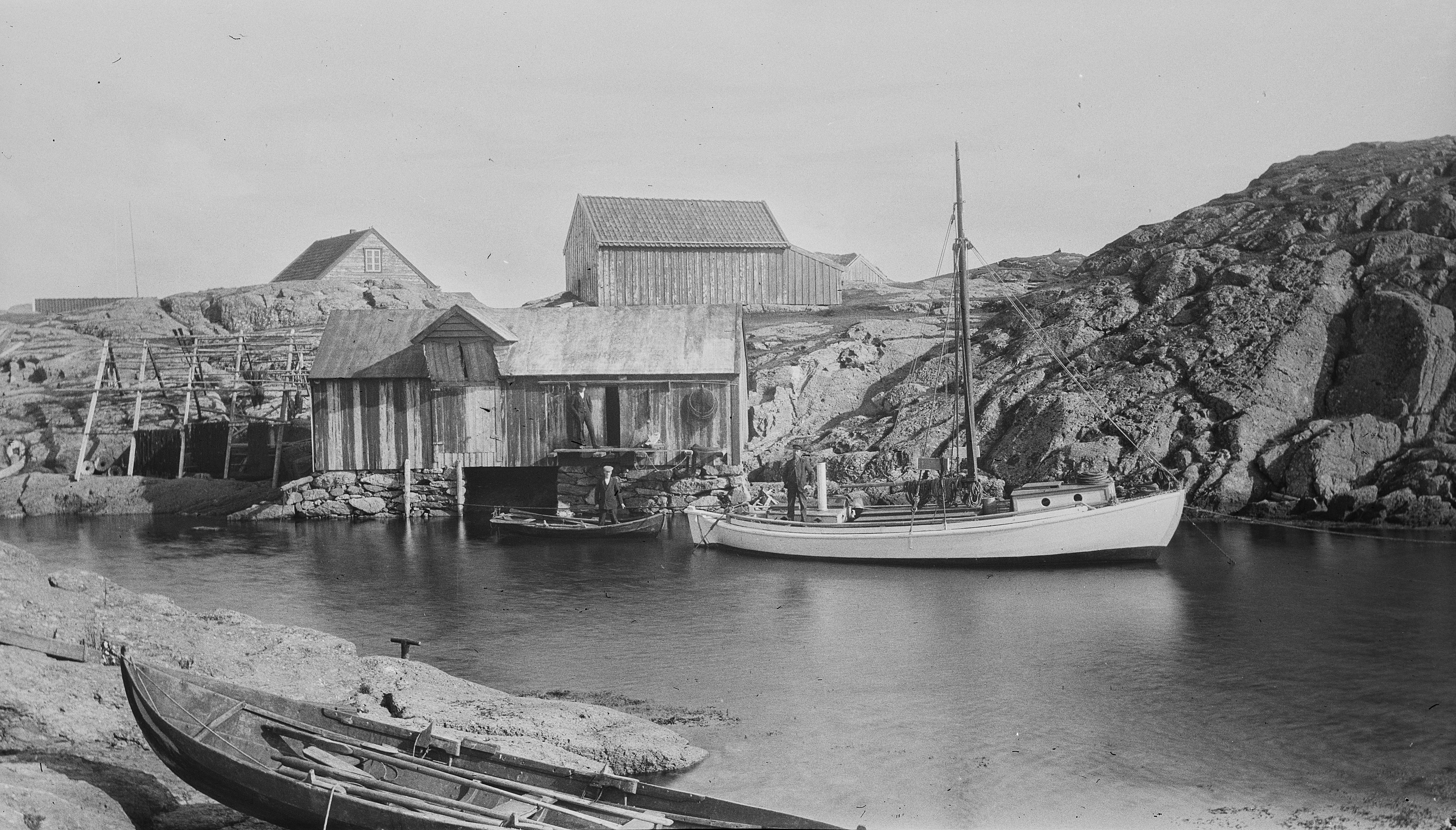

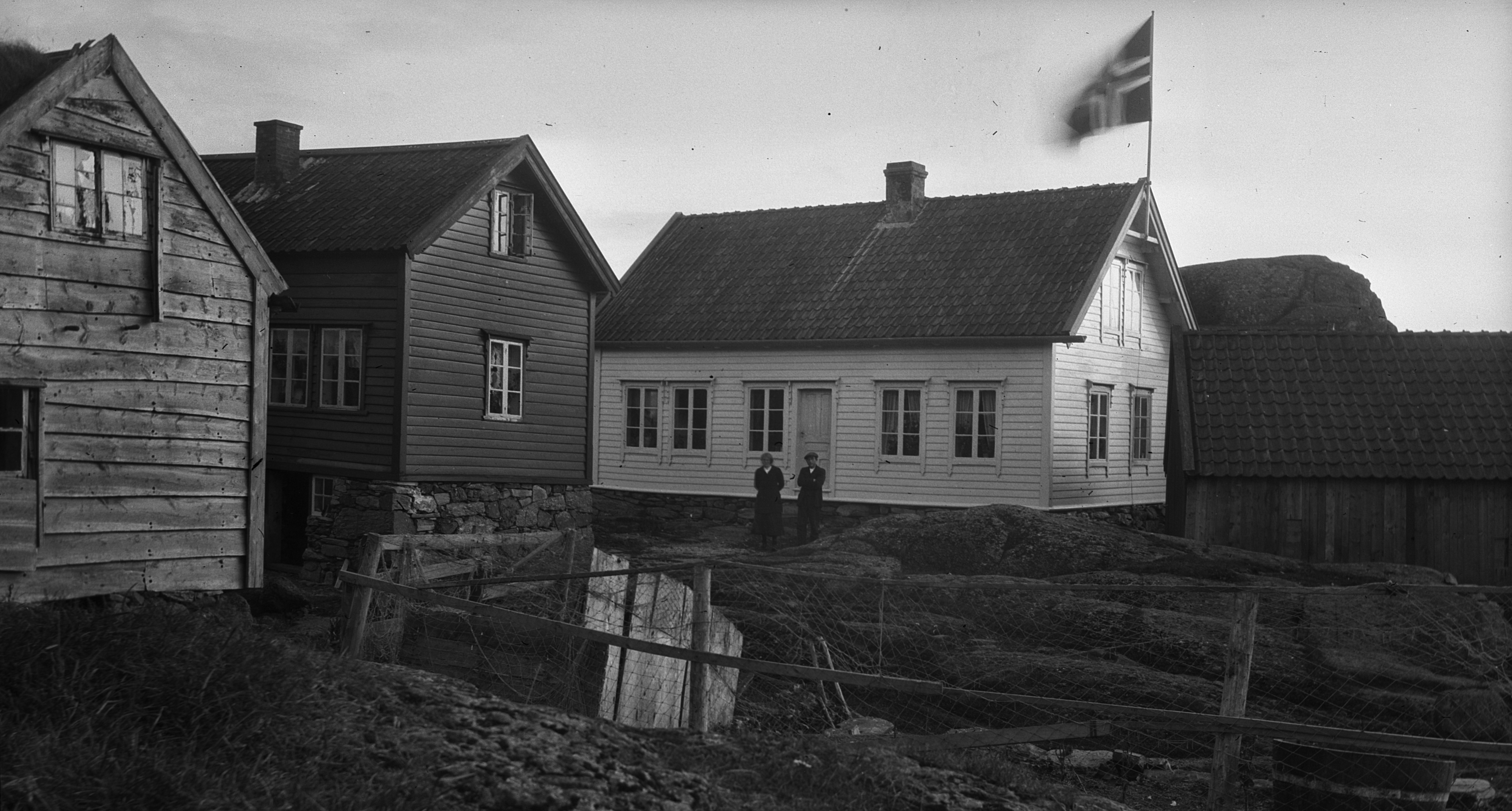

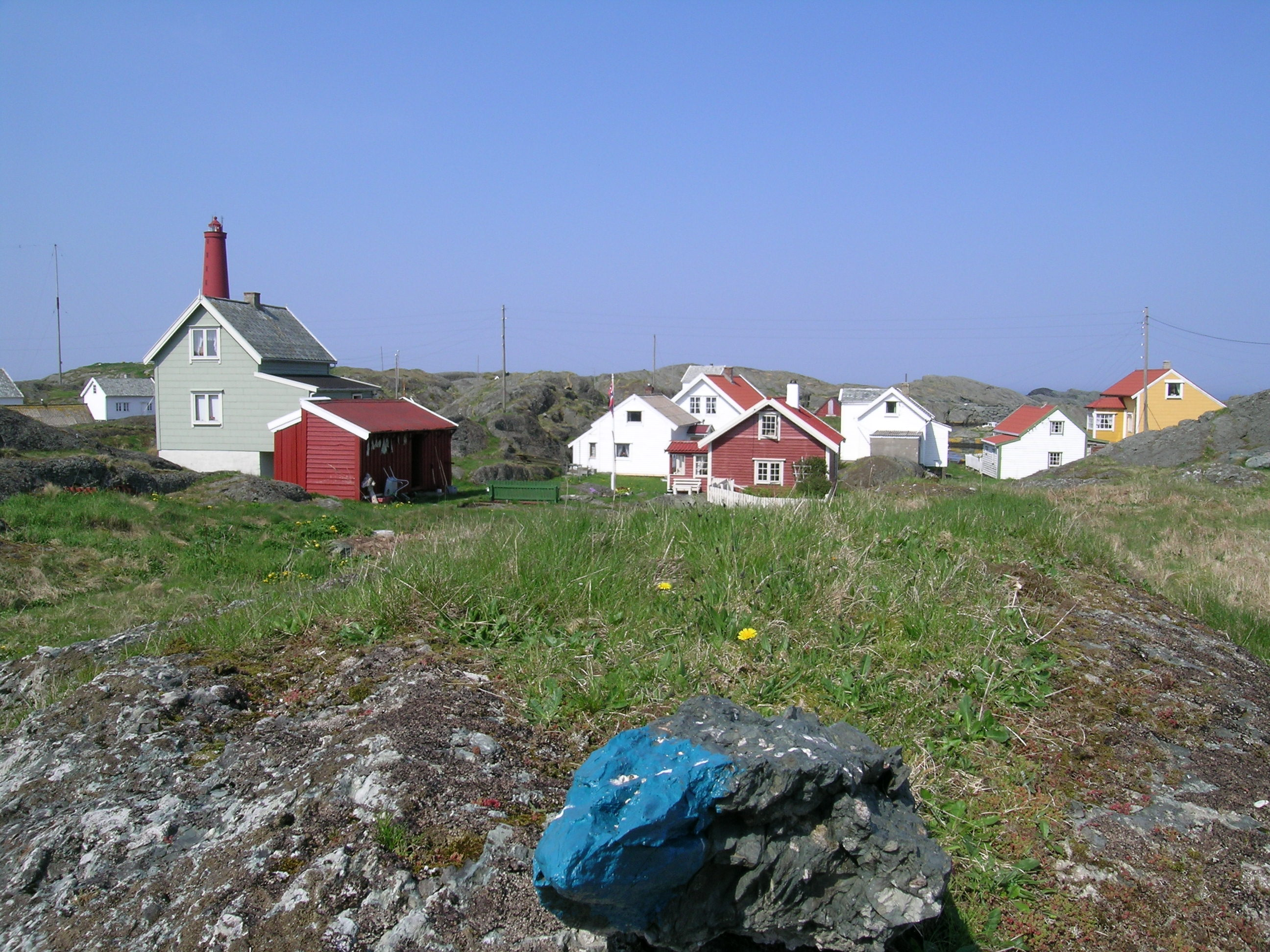

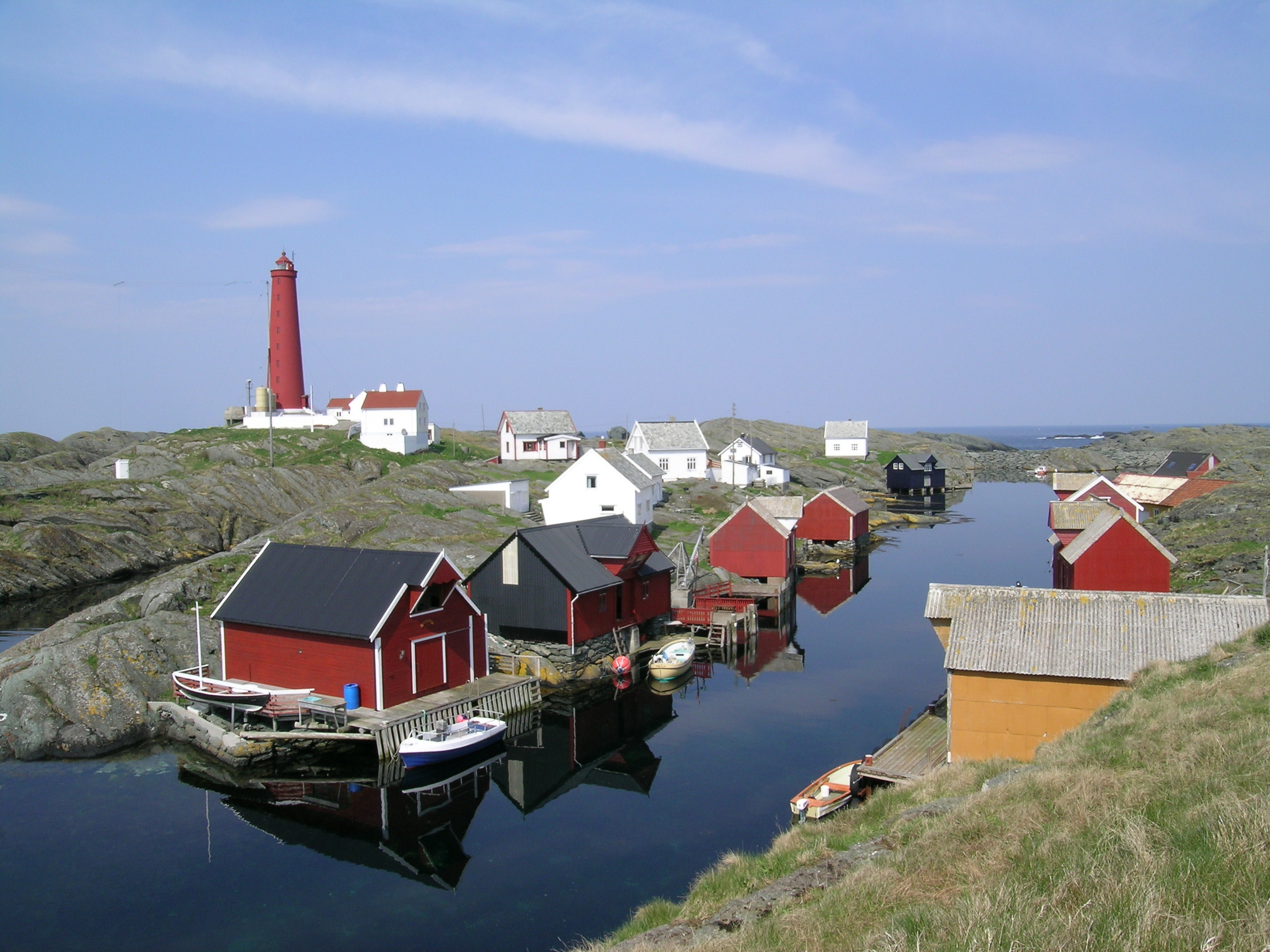

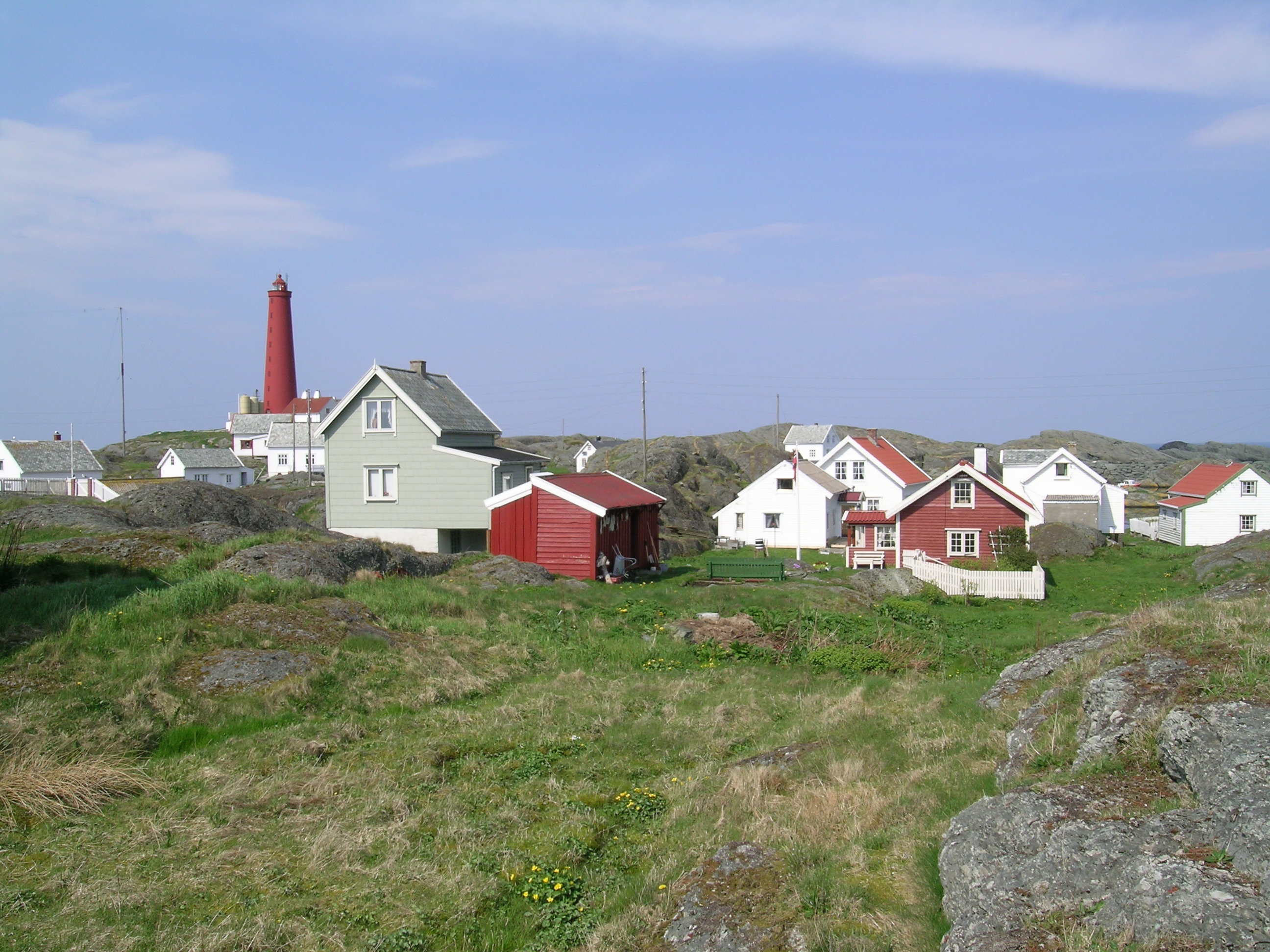

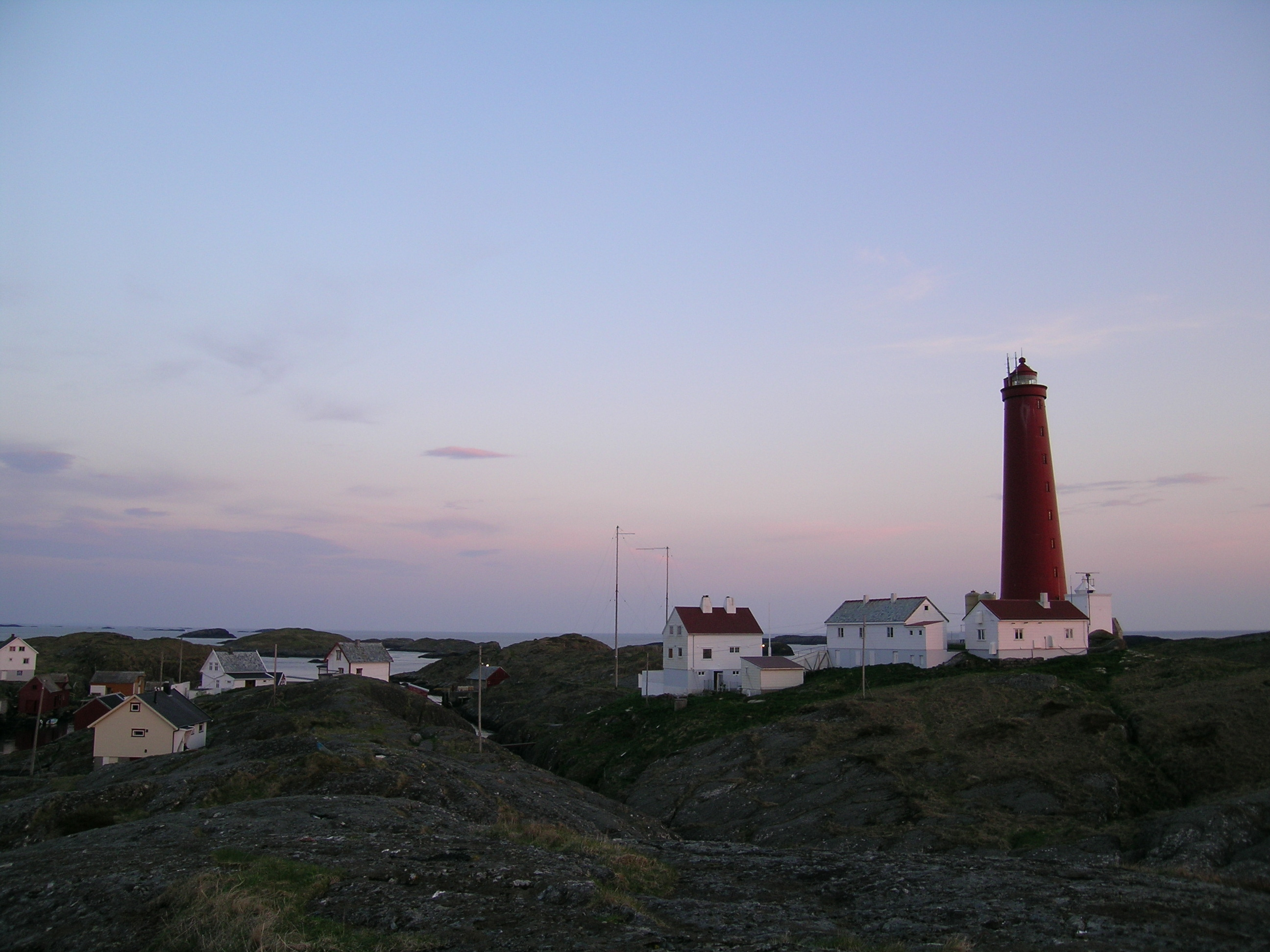

== See also ==
- List of islands of Norway
