= Paul Vårdal =

Norwegian accountant

Paul Vårdal (29 September 1925 – 17 January 2010) was a Norwegian accountant.

He was born in Solund Municipality. At the Norwegian School of Economics and Business Administration he took the siv.øk. degree in 1939 and the accountant's exam in 1945. In 1951 he took the cand.jur. degree. He worked as chief accountant in the company Hardanger Sunnhordlandske Dampskipsselskap from 1947 to 1957, and then ran his own accountant's office. He was a lecturer at the Norwegian School of Economics and Business Administration from 1966 to 1971 and a docent from 1971 to 1979. In these positions he was a pioneer of accountant education in Norway. Vårdal returned to running the accountant's office in 1979, but later served as assisting professor. He retired in 1989.

He lived in Tertnes. He died in late January 2010.
