= Holmebåen =

Westernmost point in Norway

- Interactive map of Holmebåen

Geography
- Location: Vestland, Norway
- Coordinates: 61.07313°N 4.49756°E

Administration
- Norway
- County: Vestland
- Municipality: Solund Municipality

Holmebåen is a point on the tiny island of Steinsøy in an archipelago of small islands northwest of the Utvær islands in Solund Municipality in Vestland county, Norway. It lies about 18 kilometres (11 mi) west of the village of Hardbakke. Holmebåen is the westernmost point in Norway proper (not counting the Jan Mayen island).
