= HNoMS Utvær =

HNoMS Utvær may refer to one of the following submarines of the Royal Norwegian Navy:

- HNoMS Utvær (P69), a British V-class submarine sold to Norway in 1946, formerly HMS Viking
- HNoMS Utvær (1965), a Kobben-class submarine, commissioned in 1965; transferred to the Royal Danish Navy in 1989; renamed HDMS Tumleren (S322), lead ship of her class
- HNoMS Utvær (1990), an Ula-class submarine, commissioned in 1990

== See also ==
- Utvær (disambiguation)
