= Husøy Church (Solund) =

Church in Vestland, Norway

- Husøy kyrkje
- Husøy Church
- 61°00′47″N 4°40′22″E
- Location: Solund Municipality, Vestland
- Country: Norway
- Denomination: Church of Norway
- Previous denomination: Catholic Church
- Churchmanship: Evangelical Lutheran

History
- Former name: Utvær kapell
- Status: Parish church
- Founded: 12th century
- Consecrated: 1896

Architecture
- Functional status: Active
- Architect: Peter Andersen
- Architectural type: Long church
- Completed: 1896 (130 years ago)

Specifications
- Capacity: 174
- Materials: Wood

Administration
- Diocese: Bjørgvin bispedømme
- Deanery: Nordhordland prosti
- Parish: Solund
- Norwegian Cultural Heritage Site
- Type: Church
- Status: Not protected
- ID: 84676

Husøy Church (Norwegian: Husøy kyrkje) is a parish church of the Church of Norway in Solund Municipality in Vestland county, Norway. It is located in the village of Kolgrov, on the western coast of the island of Ytre Sula. It is one of the three churches for the Solund parish which is part of the Nordhordland prosti (deanery) in the Diocese of Bjørgvin. The white, wooden church was built in a long church design in 1896 using plans drawn up by the architect Peter Andersen. The church seats about 174 people.

== History ==
The earliest existing historical records of the church date back to the year 1350, but it was not new that year. The first church was a wooden stave church that was located on the island of Utvær, and at that time, it was known as the Utvær kapell (chapel). The church was likely built during the 12th century. It was an annex chapel within the great parish of Evindvig. There were only a few services per year at that chapel, and it was difficult to get to during the winter. The chapel was dedicated to St. Clement, the patron saint of mariners. The chapel was located on this fairly small island, about 30 kilometres (19 mi) west of the mainland coast, but this area was historically important. Legend has it that King Harald Hardråde gathered his fleet at Utvær before sailing to attack England in 1066. This area was also one of the common meeting place for sailors heading to Iceland and other islands. The weather on Utvær was harsh and the chapel sat on a high point, very visible on the relatively flat, rocky islands. There are reports of the roof being blown off the chapel and the siding being repaired. In 1666 or 1667, some Scottish seafarers raided and plundered the chapel and broke some windows. Reports from 1686 tell that Utvær chapel had a nave that measured 7 by 6 metres (23 ft × 20 ft) and a square choir that measured 4 metres (13 ft) on each side. It was also mentioned that the church was in poor condition and rarely used anymore. The last service held at Utvær was on 1 August 1717. After that, the church was torn down and replaced with a new church on the small island of Husøy, about 7 kilometres (4.3 mi) away and much closer to the mainland. In 1723, the old chapel was torn down.

The new chapel was built in the fall of 1717 or the spring of 1718 on the small island of Husøy, just west of the large island of Ytre Sula. It was a small white church with its nave measuring 7.5 by 6.3 metres (25 ft × 21 ft) with a low steeple. The new church could seat about 120 people. The church site was not the greatest. By 1755, the church records show that the wooden beams supporting the floor were already rotting. Also, there was very little soil on the rocky island, so it was very difficult to bury coffins in the churchyard. In 1787, the church was repaired with the hopes that it would last another 100 years. During the 1800s, the area had increased in population so that the congregation was nearly 500 people.

In 1888, Husøy was split out from the vast Eivindvig prestegjeld, becoming a parish of its own. This meant that Husøy Church was the only church to serve the new parish, and it was located in the far western part of the municipality on a small island, so it was rather difficult to get to. It was eventually decided to move the church again. It was moved to the village of Kolgrov on the western coast of Ytre Sula island. The church was designed by Peter Andersen and the lead builder was Peter Gabrielsen. Construction of the new building began in the spring of 1896. The new church was consecrated on 15 October 1896. When the new church was completed, the old church on Husøy was sold and torn down. The materials were used to build a prayer house in Leirvåg in Lindås Municipality.

== See also ==
- List of churches in Bjørgvin
