= Sula, Solund =

Island in Vestland, Norway

Sula
- Interactive map of Sula

Geography
- Location: Vestland, Norway
- Coordinates: 61.1146°N 4.9534°E
- Archipelago: Solund
- Area: 116 km^{2} (45 sq mi)
- Length: 18 km (11.2 mi)
- Width: 11 km (6.8 mi)
- Highest elevation: 569 m (1867 ft)
- Highest point: Krakhellenipa

Administration
- Norway
- County: Vestland
- Municipality: Solund Municipality

Demographics
- Population: 525 (2001)
- Pop. density: 4.5/km^{2} (11.7/sq mi)

Sula (Urban East Norwegian: [ˈsʉ̀ːɽɑ] (unofficially: Indre Solundøy [ˈɪ̂ndrə ˈsûːlʉnœʏ]) is an island in Solund Municipality in Vestland county, Norway. The 116-square-kilometre (45 sq mi) island is the main island of the municipality. The island is located at the mouth of the Sognefjorden on the north side of the Sognesjøen, about 18 kilometres (11 mi) east of Holmebåen, the westernmost point in Norway. The largest village on the island is Hardbakke. The other main village area is Hersvikbygda on the northern part of the island.

The island has a ferry service from the village of Krakhella on the island to the mainland village of Rutledal in Gulen Municipality and also to the village of Losnegard on the neighboring island of Losna, immediately to the east of Sula. Just southwest of Hardbakke, there is a bridge from Sula to the neighboring island of Steinsundøyna to the west. A narrow 65-metre (213 ft) wide channel separates the two islands.

== Media gallery ==
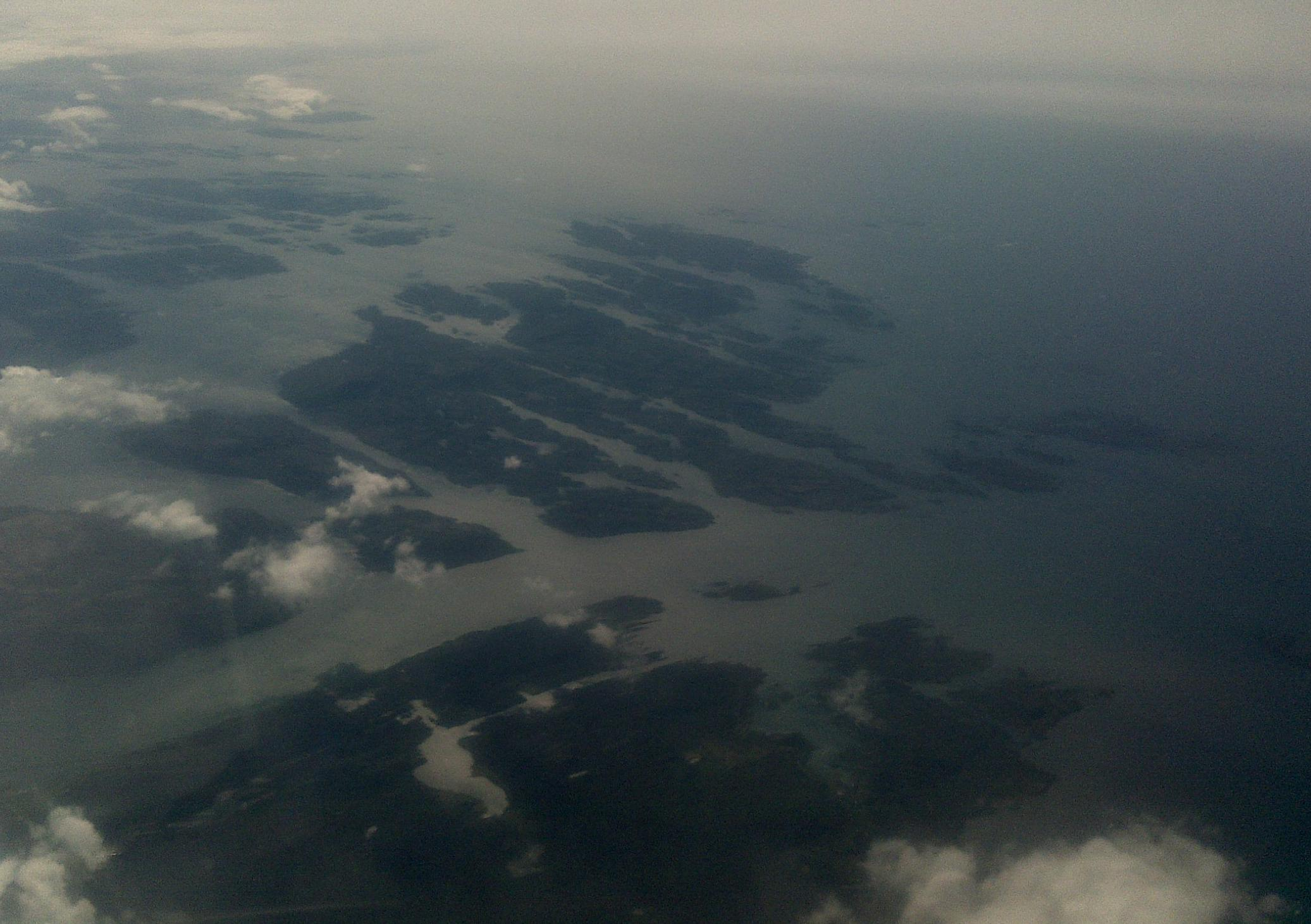
View of Sula island (looking southwest)

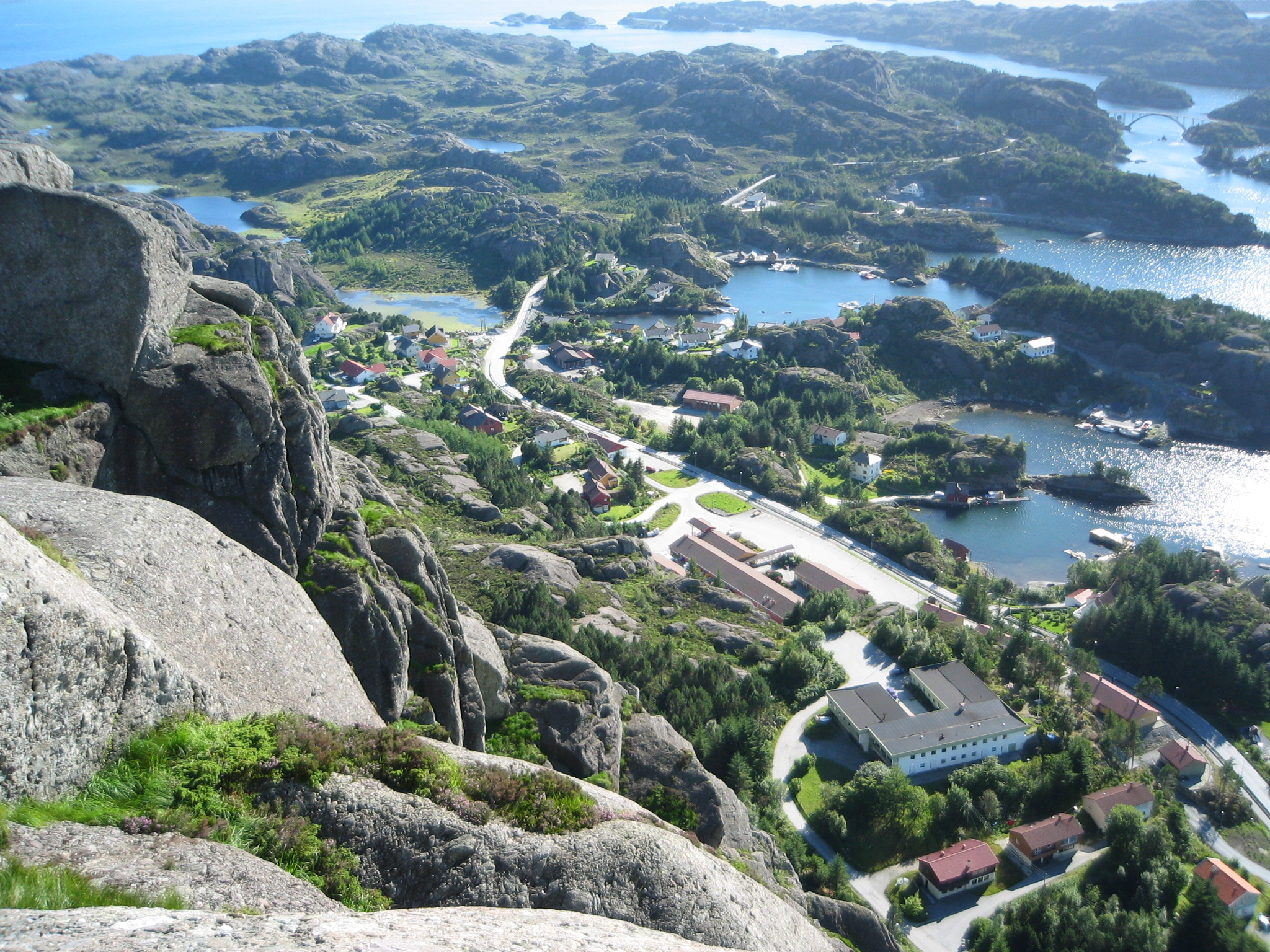
View of Hardbakke, on Sula island

== See also ==
- List of islands of Norway
