= Utvær Lighthouse =

Coastal lighthouse in Norway

Utvær Lighthouse Utvær fyr
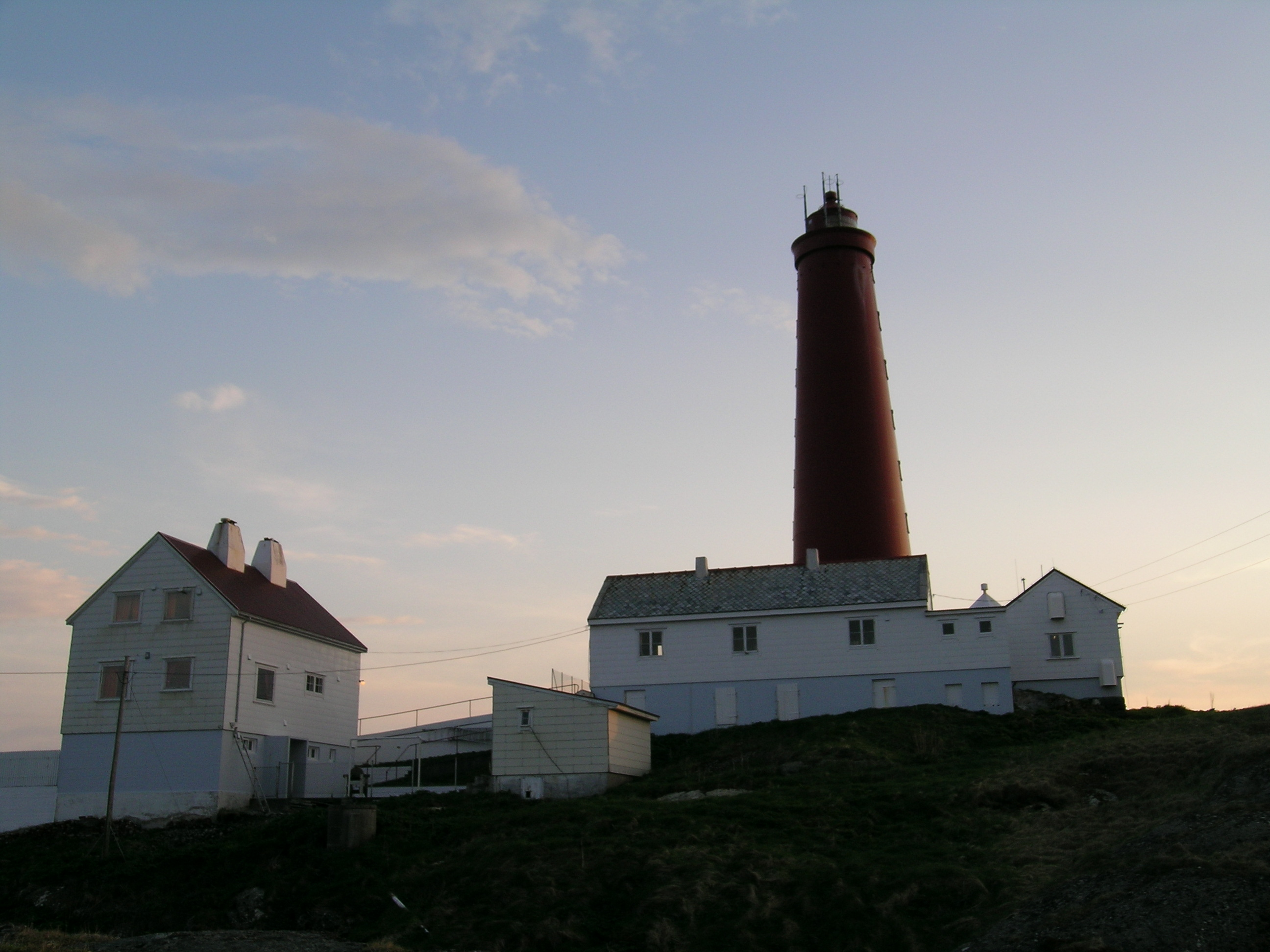
- View of the lighthouse
- Location: Solund Municipality; Vestland; Norway
- Coordinates: 61°02′N 4°31′E

Tower
- Constructed: 1900
- Construction: cast iron tower
- Automated: 1986
- Height: 31 m (102 ft)
- Shape: cylindrical tower with balcony and lantern
- Markings: red tower and lantern
- Heritage: cultural property

Light
- Focal height: 45 m (148 ft)
- Intensity: 2,005,000 candela
- Range: 18.6 nmi (34.4 km; 21.4 mi)
- Characteristic: Fl W 30s

Utvær Lighthouse (Norwegian: Utvær fyr) is the westernmost coastal lighthouse in Norway. It is located in the western part of Solund Municipality in Vestland county.

== History ==
It was first lit in 1900 and it was listed as a protected site in 1999. The surrounding area is protected as a nature reserve. It is located on a small, rocky island about 6.5 kilometres (4.0 mi) due west of the island of Ytre Sula. The site is accessible only by boat, but guided tours are available.

The 31-metre (102 ft) tall, round, cast iron tower is painted red. At the top sits a light that emits a white flash every 30 seconds at an elevation of 45 metres (148 ft) above sea level. The lighthouse marks the line of transition between the North Sea to the southwest and the Norwegian Sea to the northwest. The light station was heavily damaged in an air raid during World War II in 1945. Many of the buildings were burned, but the historic tower was spared.

Utvær lighthouse is currently displayed on the 50-kroner Norwegian banknote.

== Gallery ==
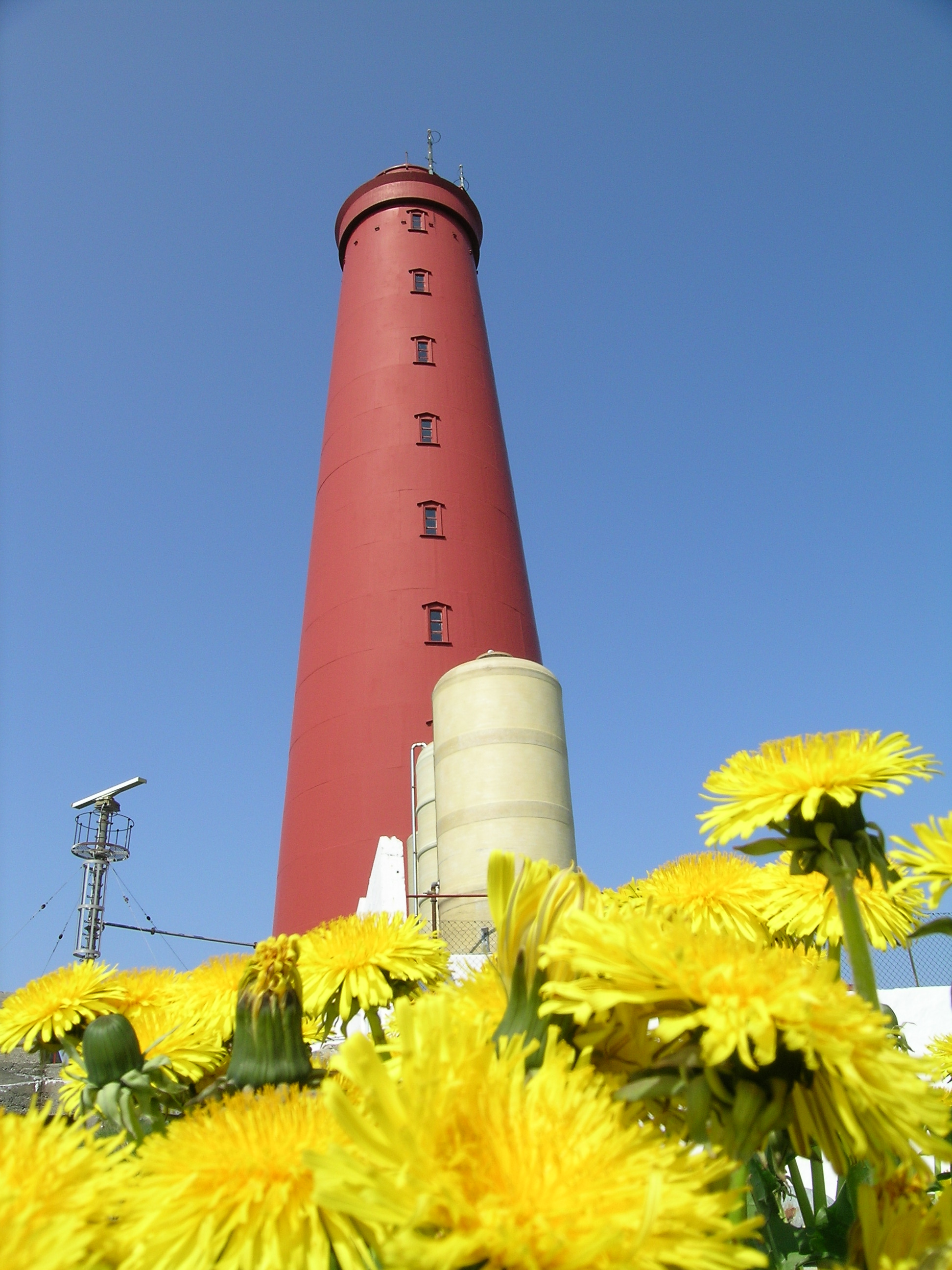
Closeup of the tower

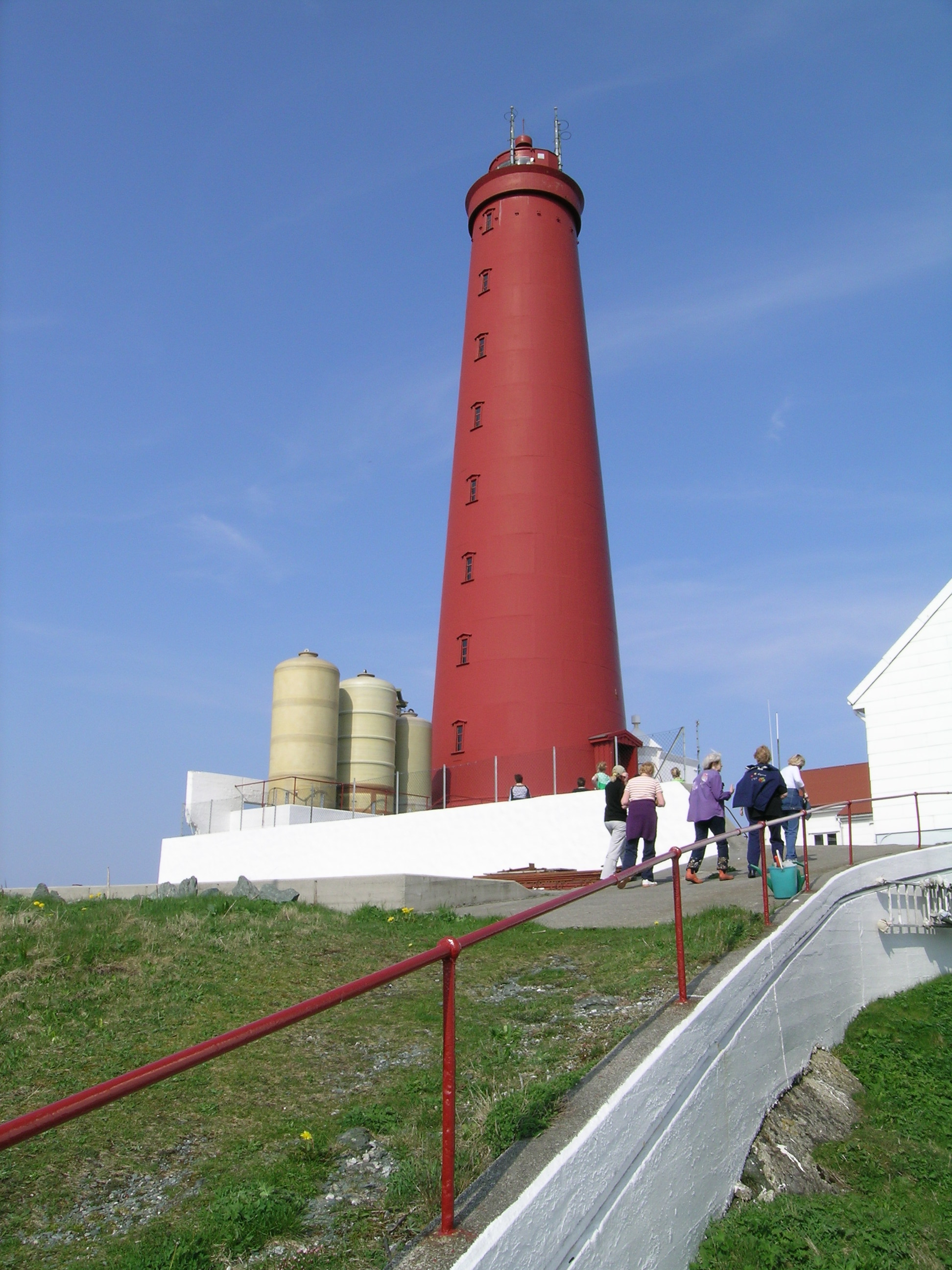
View of the lighthouse complex

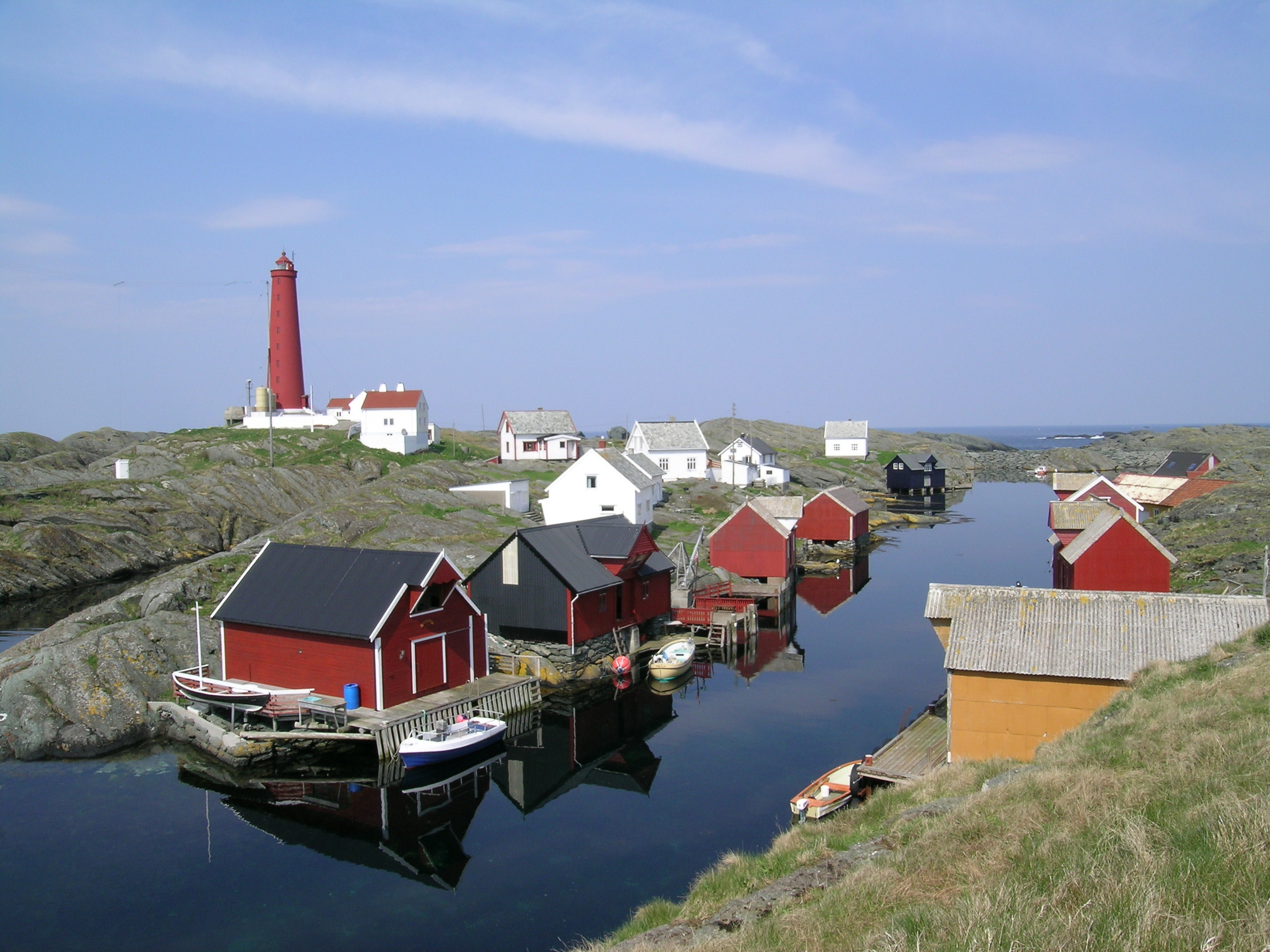
View of the lighthouse and the local village

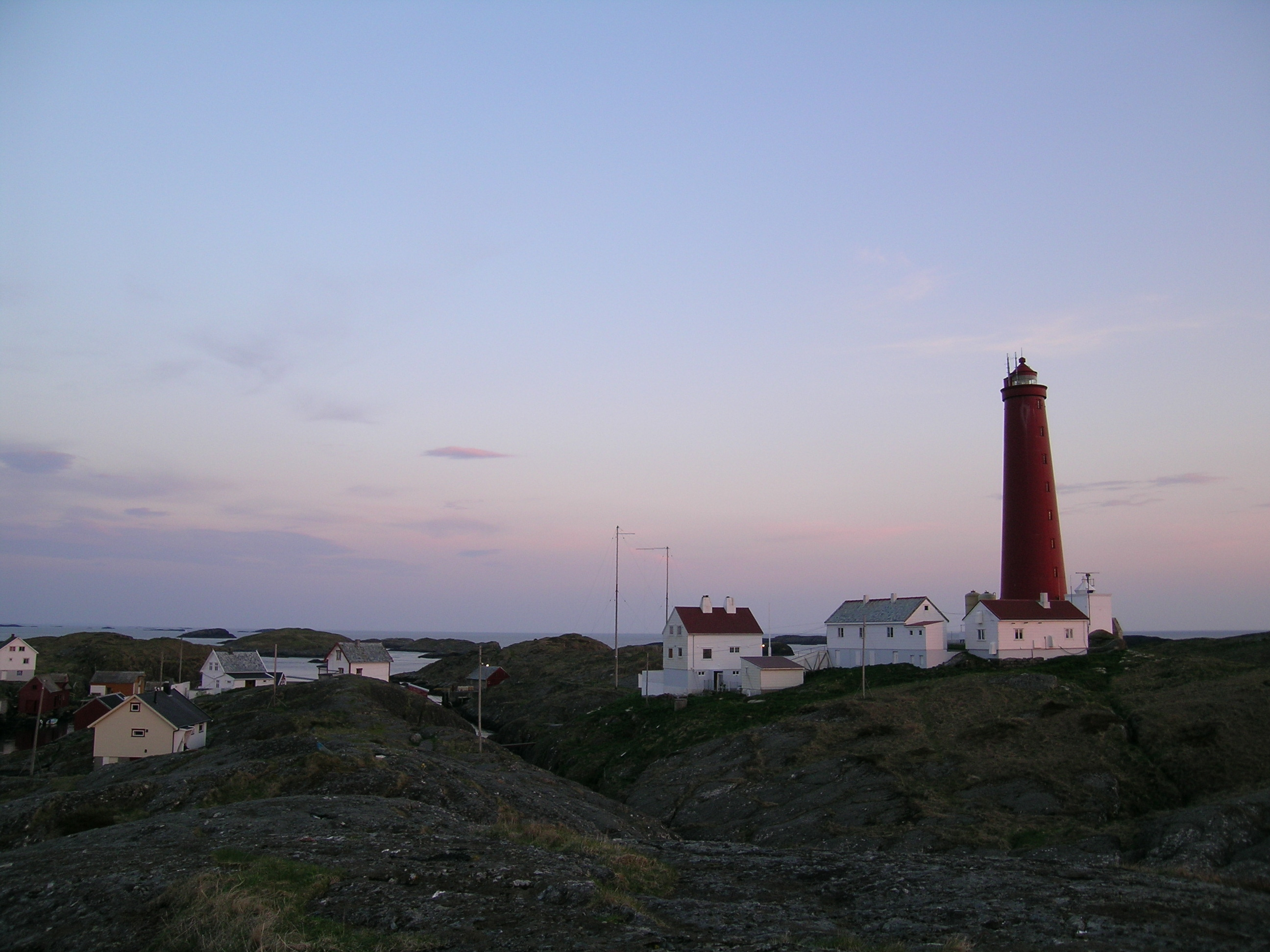
Alternate view

== See also ==
- Lighthouses in Norway
- List of lighthouses in Norway
