= Sognesjøen =

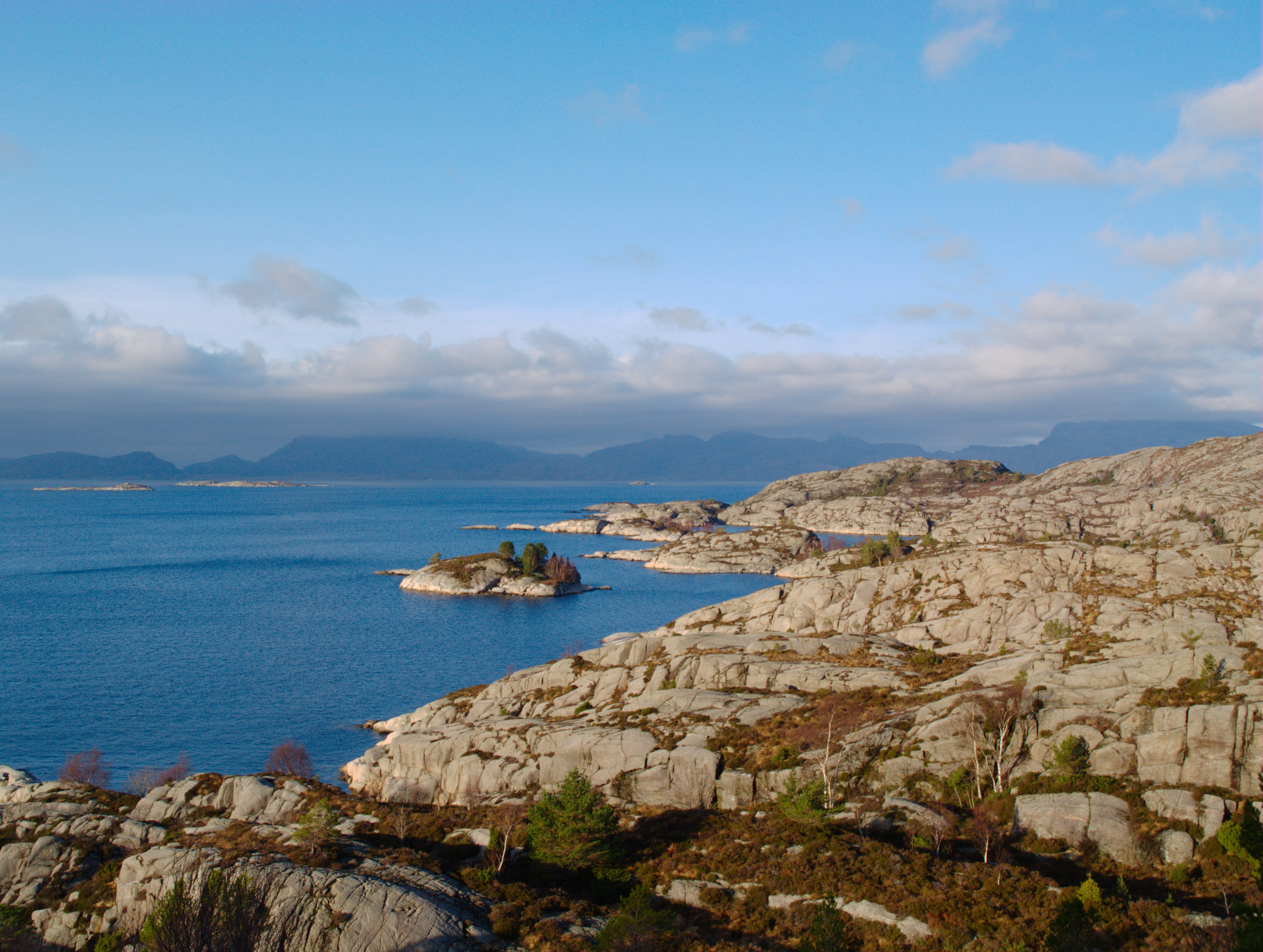
- View of the fjord from Gulen
- Interactive map of the fjord
- Location: Vestland county, Norway
- Coordinates: 61.03352°N 4.93157°E
- Type: Strait
- Primary inflows: Sognefjorden
- Primary outflows: North Sea
- Basin countries: Norway
- Max. length: 35 kilometres (22 mi)
- Max. depth: 1,300 metres (4,300 ft)

Sognesjøen is a strait in Vestland county, Norway. The strait is the outermost part of the large Sognefjorden. It runs along the border between Solund Municipality and Gulen Municipality. The 35-kilometre (22 mi) long strait begins around the village of Rutledal on the mainland of Gulen at the mouth of the Sognefjorden. The strait then flows in a southwesterly direction into the North Sea, just north of the islands of Fedje Municipality. The Sognesjøen is surrounded by many large and small islands. The islands of Sula, Steinsundøyna, Ytre Sula lie along the northern side of the strait. The mainland and the islands of Hiserøyna, Hille, Kversøyna, and Byrknesøyna lie along the southern side of the strait.
