= Hardbakke =

Village in Solund Municipality, Norway

- Village
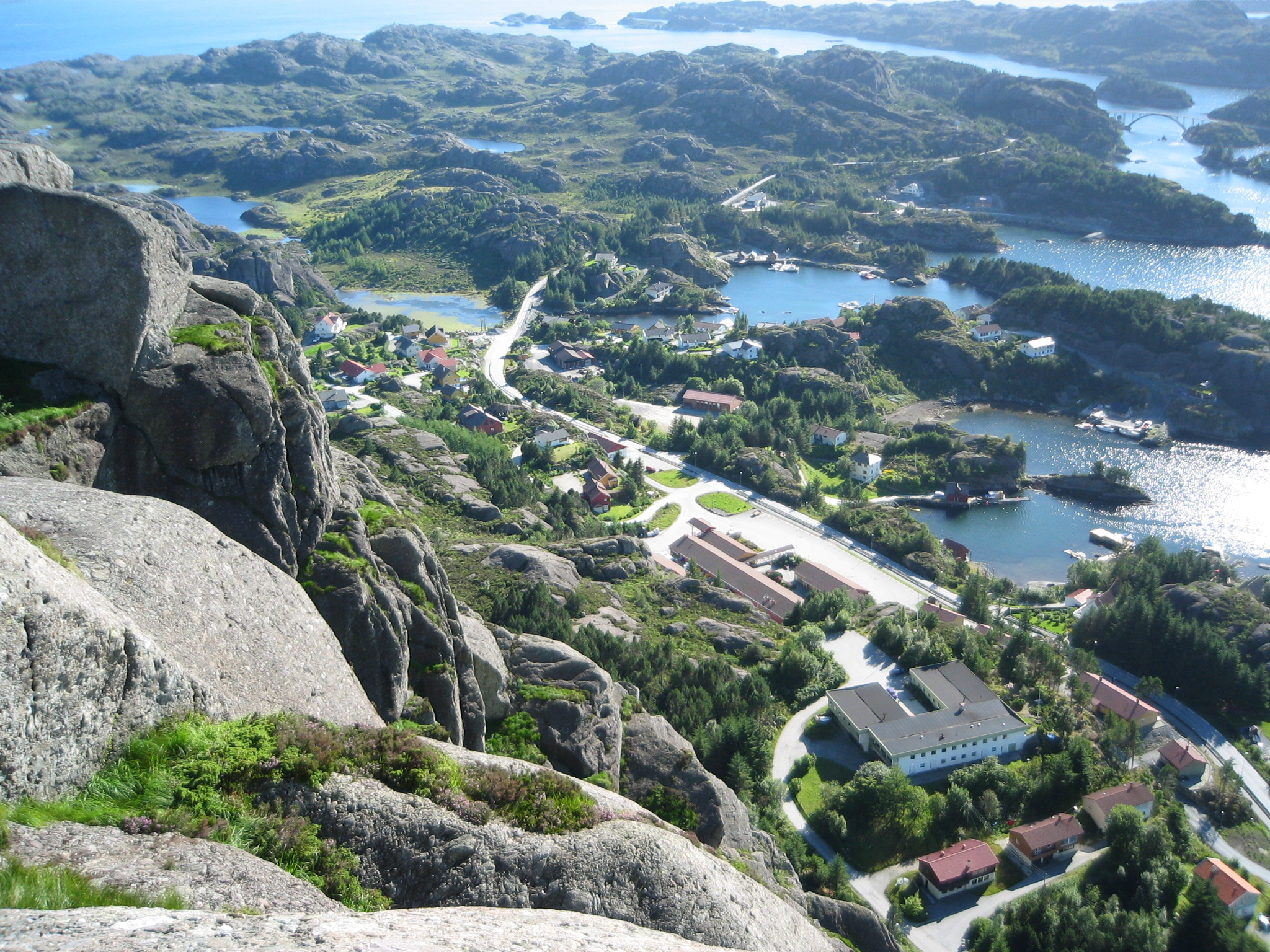
- View of Hardbakke (looking southwest)
- Interactive map of Hardbakke
- Location within Vestland Location within Norway
- Coordinates: 61.0756°N 4.8411°E
- Country: Norway
- Region: Western Norway
- County: Vestland
- District: Sogn
- Municipality: Solund Municipality

Area
  - Total: 0.28 km^{2} (0.11 sq mi)
- Elevation: 62 m (203 ft)

Population (2025)
  - Total: 269
  - Density: 961/km^{2} (2,490/sq mi)
- Time zone: UTC+01:00 (CET)
  - Summer (DST): UTC+02:00 (CEST)
- Post Code: 6924 Hardbakke

Hardbakke (lit. 'Hard Hill') is the administrative centre of Solund Municipality in Vestland county, Norway. The village is located on the west side of the island of Sula, just across the strait from the island of Steinsundøyna. Hardbakke is located about halfway between the islet of Holmebåen and the village of Losnegard, the western- and easternmost points in the municipality. Hardbakke has an elementary school and a secondary school, as well as Solund Church.

The 0.28-square-kilometre (69-acre) village has a population (2025) of 269 and a population density of 961 inhabitants per square kilometre (2,490/sq mi).
