= Rutledal =

Village in Gulen Municipality, Norway

Rutledal Rutledalen (historic)
- Village
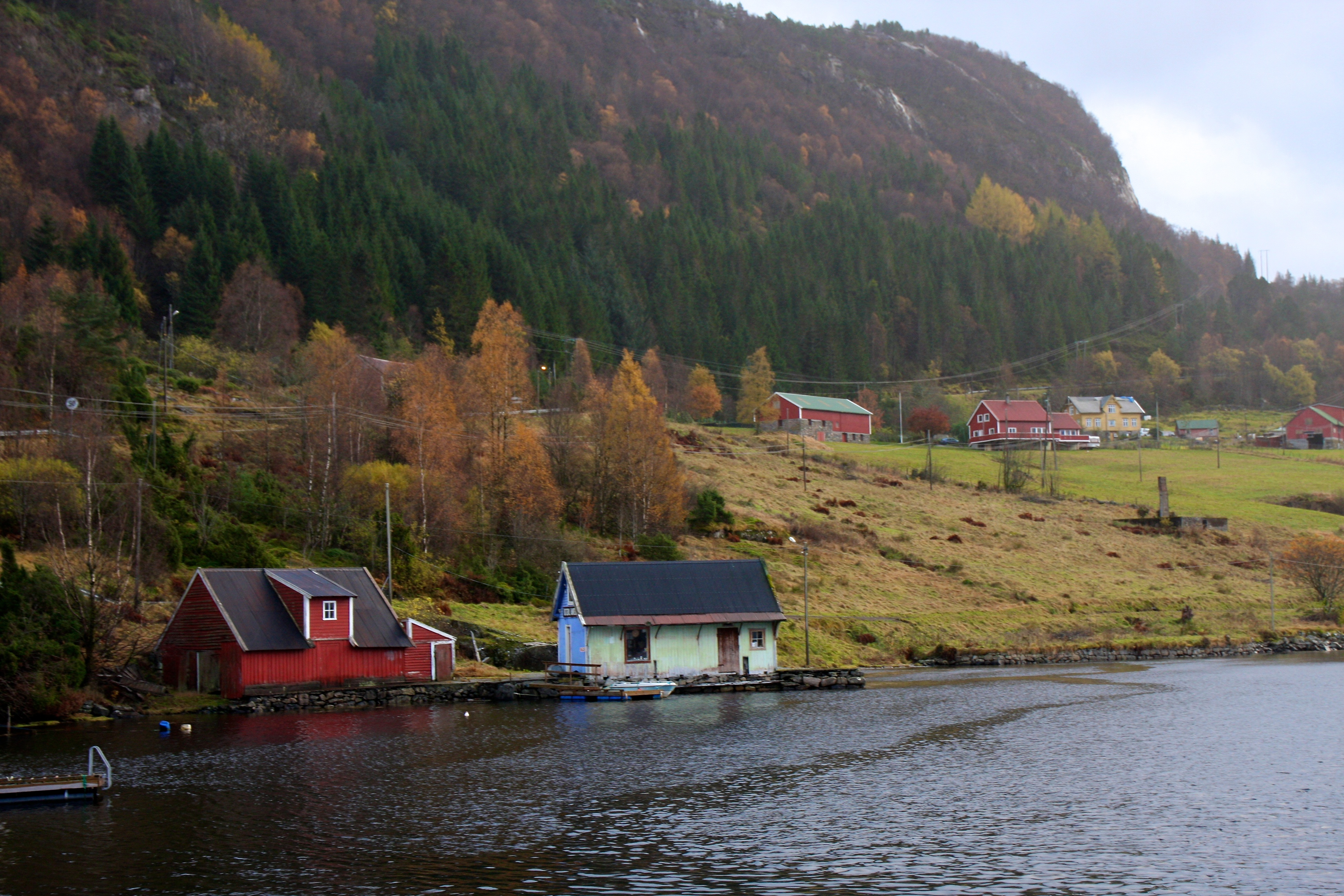
- View of the shoreline in Rutledal
- Interactive map of Rutledal
- Location within Vestland Location within Norway
- Coordinates: 61.06712°N 5.18826°E
- Country: Norway
- Region: Western Norway
- County: Vestland
- District: Sogn
- Municipality: Gulen Municipality
- Elevation: 51 m (167 ft)
- Time zone: UTC+01:00 (CET)
  - Summer (DST): UTC+02:00 (CEST)
- Post Code: 5966 Eivindvik

Rutledal is a village in Gulen Municipality in Vestland county, Norway. The village is located at the mouth of the Sognefjorden, on the south side on the mainland. Rutledal has a ferry quay that has regular connections to the islands of Solund Municipality to the northwest and to Hyllestad Municipality on the mainland across the fjord to the north. Rutledal is located about 20 kilometres (12 mi) to the northwest of the village of Brekke and about 15 kilometres (9.3 mi) to the north of the municipal centre of Eivindvik.

Rutledal is a rural village sitting at the northern end of a narrow, forested valley. The Rutledal area has a number of farms that have been cleared of trees, although not all are currently in use. For a time, Rutledal had a small store and a post office.
