= Solund Municipality =

Municipality in Vestland, Norway

Solund Municipality Solund kommune
- Municipality
- Sulen herred (historic name); Utvær herred (historic name)
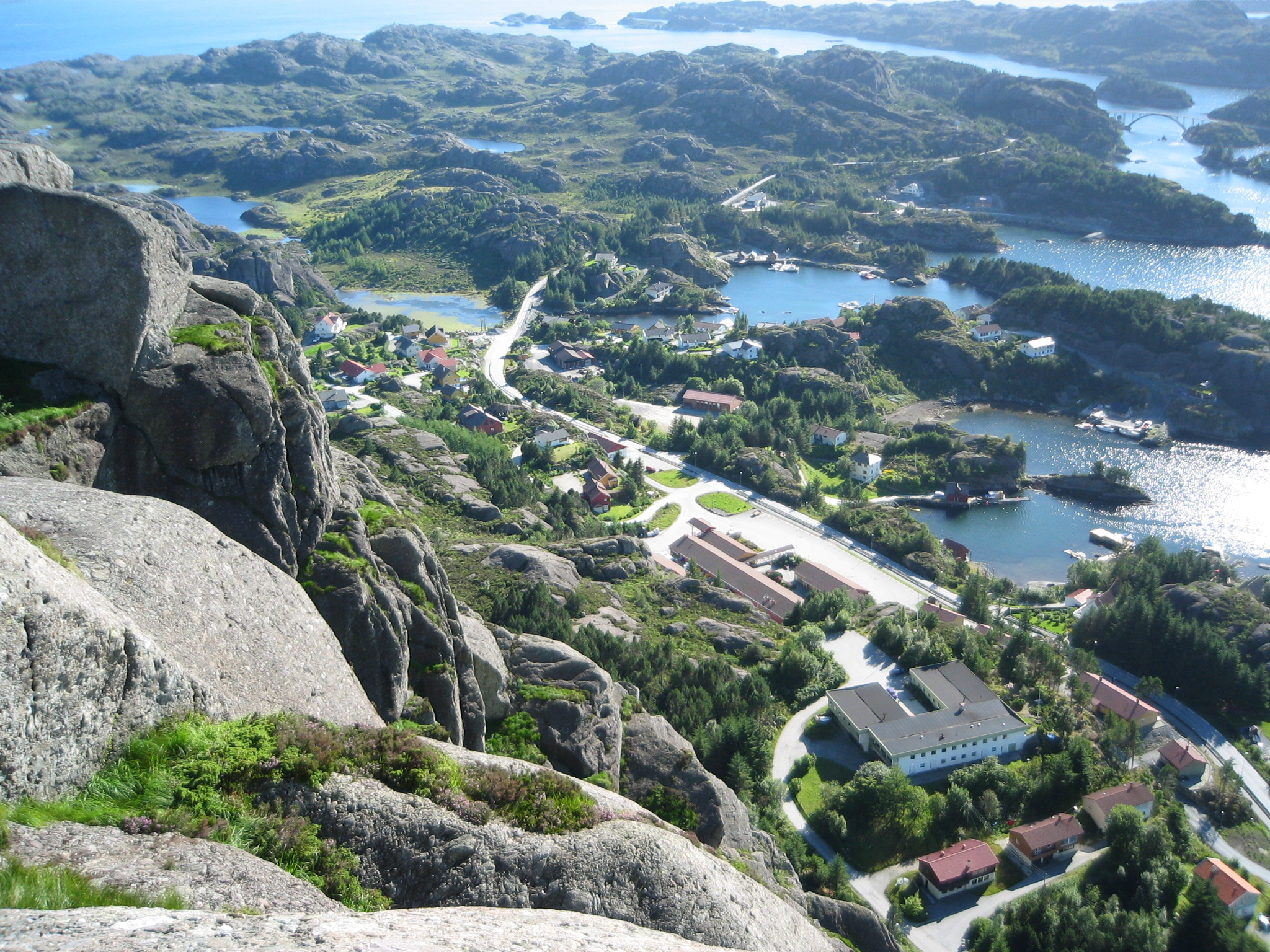
- View of Hardbakke

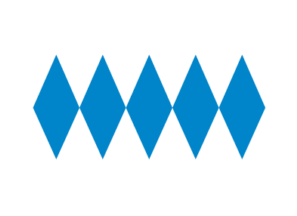
- Flag Coat of arms

- Vestland within Norway

- Solund within Vestland
- Coordinates: 61°07′51″N 04°56′52″E
- Country: Norway
- County: Vestland
- District: Sogn
- Established: 1858
  - Preceded by: Evindvig Municipality
- Administrative centre: Hardbakke

Government
  - Mayor (2015): Gunn Åmdal Mongstad (Sp)

Area
  - Total: 228.21 km^{2} (88.11 sq mi)
  - Land: 219.11 km^{2} (84.60 sq mi)
  - Water: 9.1 km^{2} (3.5 sq mi) 4%
  - Rank: #296 in Norway
- Highest elevation: 568.67 m (1,865.7 ft)

Population (2025)
  - Total: 740
  - Rank: #347 in Norway
  - Density: 3.2/km^{2} (8.3/sq mi)
  - Change (10 years): ▼ −8%
- Demonym: Suling

Official language
  - Norwegian form: Nynorsk
- Time zone: UTC+01:00 (CET)
  - Summer (DST): UTC+02:00 (CEST)
- ISO 3166 code: NO-4636
- Website: Official website

Solund is a municipality in Vestland county, Norway. It is located in the traditional district of Sogn. Solund Municipality is the westernmost island municipality in Norway. Holmebåen on the island of Steinsøy is the westernmost point in all of Norway. Most residents of the municipality live on the main islands of Sula and Ytre Sula. The administrative centre is the village of Hardbakke on Sula island. Some other villages in Solund include Kolgrov on Ytre Sula, Hersvikbygda on Sula, and Losnegard on Losna.

The 228.21-square-kilometre (88.11 sq mi) municipality is the 296th largest by area out of the 357 municipalities in Norway. Solund Municipality is the 347th most populous municipality in Norway with a population of 740. The municipality's population density is 3.2 inhabitants per square kilometre (8.3/sq mi) and its population has decreased by 8% over the previous 10-year period.

In 2016, the chief of police for Vestlandet formally suggested a reconfiguration of police districts and stations. He proposed that the police station in Solund be closed.

== General information ==
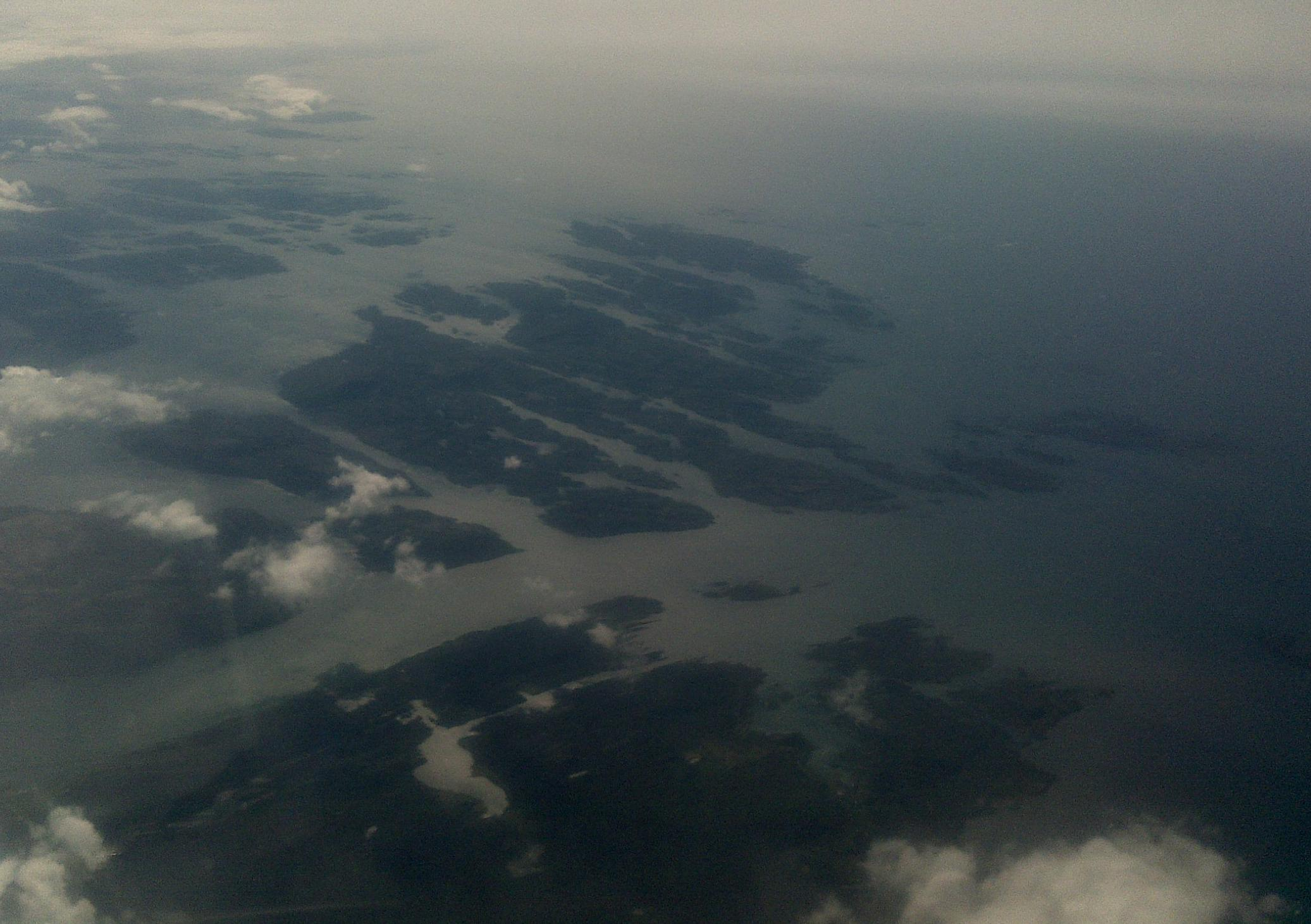
Aerial view of the islands

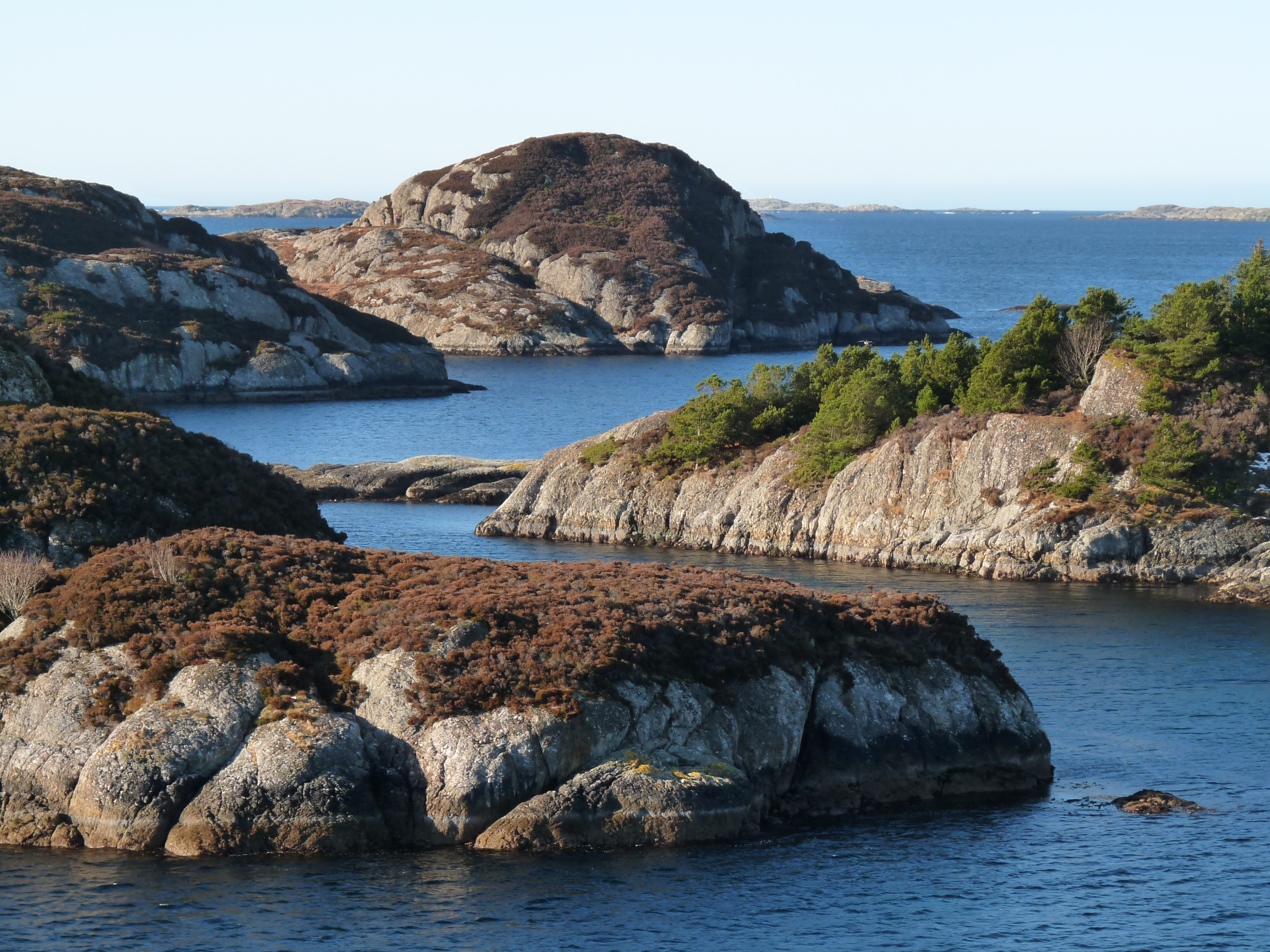
View of the Ospa narrows strait

In 1858, the large Gulen Municipality was divided in two. The two parishes (Norwegian: sokn) of Solund and Husøy (population: 1,384) became the new Utvær Municipality and the rest of Gulen (population: 3,018) remained as Gulen Municipality.

On 1 January 1888, the Krakken farm (population: 17) on the extreme northeastern part of the island of Sula was transferred from Hyllestad Municipality and eight farms in the Hersvikbygda area (population: 317) on the northern oart of the island Sula were transferred from Askvoll Municipality and they were all added to Utvær Municipality.

On 1 July 1890, the name was changed from Utvær Municipality was changed to Sulen Municipality. The spelling was later altered to Solund Municipality by royal decree on 16 November 1923. During the 1960s, there were many municipal mergers across Norway due to the work of the Schei Committee. On 1 January 1964, the island of Losna (population: 40) was transferred from Gulen Municipality to Solund Municipality.

Historically, this municipality was part of the old Sogn og Fjordane county. On 1 January 2020, the municipality became a part of the newly-formed Vestland county (after Hordaland and Sogn og Fjordane counties were merged).

=== Name ===
The municipality (originally the parish) was originally named after the old Utvær farm (Old Norse: Útver) since the first Utvær Chapel was built there. The first element is út which means "outer". The last element is ver which means "fishing station". The municipality had this name from 1858 until 1 July 1890 when it was renamed Sulen. The new name was chosen since it was the name of the large island of Sula (Old Norse: Sólund or Sólundir). The first element comes from the word sól which means "furrow" or "incision". The last element is a suffix, -und, which means "a place where it is found", thus it means something like "an island where furrows and incisions are found", likely referring to the jagged, rocky form of the island. In Old Norse times, the sea between Norway and Scotland was called Sólundirhaf which means "the sea (haf) of Solund."

Historically, the name of the municipality was Utvær. On 1 July 1890, a royal resolution changed the name of the municipality to Sulen. On 16 November 1923, a royal resolution changed the spelling of the name of the municipality to Solund.

=== Coat of arms ===
The coat of arms was granted on 16 February 1990. The official blazon is "Argent, five lozenges azure in fess" (Norwegian: På sølv grunn fem blå spissruter). This means the arms have a field (background) has a tincture of argent which means it is commonly colored white, but if it is made out of metal, then silver is used. The charge is a set of five blue lozenges (diamonds) lined up horizontally. The arms were inspired by the coat of arms of the now-extinct medieval noble family from the island of Losna. The arms were designed by Arvid Sveen from Vadsø who based it off an original idea by Hans H. Steinsund. The municipal flag has the same design as the coat of arms.

=== Churches ===
The Church of Norway has one parish (sokn) (made up of three churches) within Solund Municipality. It is part of the Nordhordland prosti (deanery) in the Diocese of Bjørgvin.

Churches in Solund Municipality
Parish (sokn)	Church name	Location of the church	Year built
Solund	Hersvik Church	Hersvikbygda	1892
Solund	Husøy Church	Kolgrov	1896
Solund	Solund Church	Hardbakke	1869

== Government ==
Solund Municipality is responsible for primary education (through 10th grade), outpatient health services, senior citizen services, welfare and other social services, zoning, economic development, and municipal roads and utilities. The municipality is governed by a municipal council of directly elected representatives. The mayor is indirectly elected by a vote of the municipal council. The municipality is under the jurisdiction of the Sogn og Fjordane District Court and the Gulating Court of Appeal.

=== Municipal council ===
The municipal council (Kommunestyre) of Solund Municipality is made up of 15 representatives that are elected to four year terms. The tables below show the current and historical composition of the council by political party.

Solund kommunestyre 2023–2027
Party name (in Nynorsk)	Number of representatives
Labour Party (Arbeidarpartiet)	2
Conservative Party (Høgre)	4
Centre Party (Senterpartiet)	8
Socialist Left Party (Sosialistisk Venstreparti)	1
Total number of members:	15

Solund kommunestyre 2019–2023
Party name (in Nynorsk)	Number of representatives
Labour Party (Arbeidarpartiet)	2
Conservative Party (Høgre)	4
Centre Party (Senterpartiet)	8
Socialist Left Party (Sosialistisk Venstreparti)	1
Total number of members:	15

Solund kommunestyre 2015–2019
Party name (in Nynorsk)	Number of representatives
Labour Party (Arbeidarpartiet)	3
Conservative Party (Høgre)	5
Centre Party (Senterpartiet)	5
Socialist Left Party (Sosialistisk Venstreparti)	2
Total number of members:	15

Solund kommunestyre 2011–2015
Party name (in Nynorsk)	Number of representatives
Labour Party (Arbeidarpartiet)	2
Progress Party (Framstegspartiet)	2
Conservative Party (Høgre)	5
Centre Party (Senterpartiet)	4
Independent Political List in Solund (Politisk Uavhengig Liste i Solund)	2
Total number of members:	15

Solund kommunestyre 2007–2011
Party name (in Nynorsk)	Number of representatives
Labour Party (Arbeidarpartiet)	3
Progress Party (Framstegspartiet)	4
Conservative Party (Høgre)	2
Centre Party (Senterpartiet)	5
Socialist Left Party (Sosialistisk Venstreparti)	1
Total number of members:	15

Solund kommunestyre 2003–2007
Party name (in Nynorsk)	Number of representatives
Labour Party (Arbeidarpartiet)	1
Progress Party (Framstegspartiet)	2
Conservative Party (Høgre)	5
Centre Party (Senterpartiet)	5
Socialist Left Party (Sosialistisk Venstreparti)	2
Total number of members:	15

Solund kommunestyre 1999–2003
Party name (in Nynorsk)	Number of representatives
Labour Party (Arbeidarpartiet)	5
Conservative Party (Høgre)	9
Centre Party (Senterpartiet)	2
Socialist Left Party (Sosialistisk Venstreparti)	1
Total number of members:	17

Solund kommunestyre 1995–1999
Party name (in Nynorsk)	Number of representatives
Labour Party (Arbeidarpartiet)	8
Conservative Party (Høgre)	5
Centre Party (Senterpartiet)	3
Joint list of the Liberal Party (Venstre) and Christian Democratic Party (Kristelig Folkeparti)	1
Total number of members:	17

Solund kommunestyre 1991–1995
Party name (in Nynorsk)	Number of representatives
Labour Party (Arbeidarpartiet)	5
Conservative Party (Høgre)	6
Christian Democratic Party (Kristeleg Folkeparti)	1
Centre Party (Senterpartiet)	4
Liberal Party (Venstre)	1
Total number of members:	17

Solund kommunestyre 1987–1991
Party name (in Nynorsk)	Number of representatives
Labour Party (Arbeidarpartiet)	3
Conservative Party (Høgre)	6
Christian Democratic Party (Kristeleg Folkeparti)	3
Centre Party (Senterpartiet)	2
Liberal Party (Venstre)	1
Independent political list (Uavhengig politisk liste)	2
Total number of members:	17

Solund kommunestyre 1983–1987
Party name (in Nynorsk)	Number of representatives
Labour Party (Arbeidarpartiet)	3
Conservative Party (Høgre)	4
Christian Democratic Party (Kristeleg Folkeparti)	4
Centre Party (Senterpartiet)	3
Liberal Party (Venstre)	2
Non-political list for Solund (Upolitisk liste for Solund)	1
Total number of members:	17

Solund kommunestyre 1979–1983
Party name (in Nynorsk)	Number of representatives
Labour Party (Arbeidarpartiet)	4
Conservative Party (Høgre)	6
Christian Democratic Party (Kristeleg Folkeparti)	3
Centre Party (Senterpartiet)	2
Liberal Party (Venstre)	2
Total number of members:	17

Solund kommunestyre 1975–1979
Party name (in Nynorsk)	Number of representatives
Labour Party (Arbeidarpartiet)	2
Conservative Party (Høgre)	5
Centre Party (Senterpartiet)	6
Common list (Fellesliste)	4
Total number of members:	17

Solund kommunestyre 1971–1975
Party name (in Nynorsk)	Number of representatives
Liberal Party (Venstre)	7
Local List(s) (Lokale lister)	10
Total number of members:	17

Solund kommunestyre 1967–1971
Party name (in Nynorsk)	Number of representatives
Liberal Party (Venstre)	7
List of workers, fishermen, and small farmholders (Arbeidarar, fiskarar, småbrukarar liste)	3
Local List(s) (Lokale lister)	7
Total number of members:	17

Solund kommunestyre 1963–1967
Party name (in Nynorsk)	Number of representatives
Liberal Party (Venstre)	9
Local List(s) (Lokale lister)	8
Total number of members:	17

Solund heradsstyre 1959–1963
Party name (in Nynorsk)	Number of representatives
Liberal Party (Venstre)	8
List of workers, fishermen, and small farmholders (Arbeidarar, fiskarar, småbrukarar liste)	2
Local List(s) (Lokale lister)	7
Total number of members:	17

Solund heradsstyre 1955–1959
Party name (in Nynorsk)	Number of representatives
Liberal Party (Venstre)	9
List of workers, fishermen, and small farmholders (Arbeidarar, fiskarar, småbrukarar liste)	5
Local List(s) (Lokale lister)	3
Total number of members:	17

Solund heradsstyre 1951–1955
Party name (in Nynorsk)	Number of representatives
Liberal Party (Venstre)	9
List of workers, fishermen, and small farmholders (Arbeidarar, fiskarar, småbrukarar liste)	3
Local List(s) (Lokale lister)	4
Total number of members:	16

Solund heradsstyre 1947–1951
Party name (in Nynorsk)	Number of representatives
Local List(s) (Lokale lister)	16
Total number of members:	16

Solund heradsstyre 1945–1947
Party name (in Nynorsk)	Number of representatives
List of workers, fishermen, and small farmholders (Arbeidarar, fiskarar, småbrukarar liste)	3
Local List(s) (Lokale lister)	13
Total number of members:	16

Solund heradsstyre 1937–1941*
Party name (in Nynorsk)	Number of representatives
Local List(s) (Lokale lister)	16
Total number of members:	16
Note: Due to the German occupation of Norway during World War II, no elections were held for new municipal councils until after the war ended in 1945.

=== Mayors ===
The mayor (Nynorsk: ordførar) of Solund Municipality is the political leader of the municipality and the chairperson of the municipal council. Here is a list of people who have held this position:

- 1858–1861: Johannes Mathiesen
- 1862–1865: Kristoffer Furrevik
- 1866–1869: Johannes Mathiesen
- 1870–1874: Halvor Jensen
- 1875–1875: Berthel A. Tungodden
- 1876–1881: Halvor Jensen
- 1882–1885: Petter Olai Johnsen
- 1886–1889: Halvor Jensen
- 1890–1895: Mons A. Aarø
- 1896–1901: Johannes K. Laagø
- 1902–1904: Henrik B. Tungodden
- 1905–1913: Johannes K. Laagø
- 1914–1919: Paul Takle
- 1920–1928: Bernt Kverhellen
- 1929–1940: Johan Færøy
- 1945–1947: Truls Pollen
- 1948–1955: Sverre Takle (H)
- 1956–1959: Anna Herland (V)
- 1960–1967: Henrik Nybø (V)
- 1968–1975: Johannes R. Oddekalv (V)
- 1976–1981: Steinar Krakhellen (H)
- 1981–1987: Reidar Engevik (KrF)
- 1988–1991: Sveinung Kråkås (H)
- 1991–1999: Vigdis Midtbø (Ap)
- 1999–2003: Steinar Krakhellen (H)
- 2003–2011: Gunn Åmdal Mongstad (Sp)
- 2011–2015: Ole Gunnar Krakhellen (H)
- 2015–present: Gunn Åmdal Mongstad (Sp)

== Population ==
Historical population

Year	Pop.	±% p.a.
1858	1,384	—
1865	1,384	+0.00%
1875	1,495	+0.77%
1891	1,916	+1.56%
1900	1,920	+0.02%
1910	1,949	+0.15%
1920	1,844	−0.55%
1930	1,882	+0.20%
1946	1,910	+0.09%

Year	Pop.	±% p.a.
1951	1,802	−1.16%
1960	1,695	−0.68%
1970	1,376	−2.06%
1980	1,211	−1.27%
1990	1,144	−0.57%
2000	959	−1.75%
2010	867	−1.00%
2020	802	−0.78%
2023	756	−1.95%

Source: Statistics Norway and Norwegian Historical Data Centre

Solund is one of the least populated municipalities in all of Norway. The population of Solund Municipality is scattered among the islands in small villages as follows:

- Hardbakke - 246 inhabitants
- Storøy/Dalesund - 139 inhabitants
- Nesefjord - 89 inhabitants
- Kolgrov/Trovåg - 62 inhabitants
- Hjønnevåg - 59 inhabitants
- Strand/Oddekalv - 53 inhabitants
- Færøy/Leknessund - 52 inhabitants
- Hersvikbygda - 42 inhabitants
- Austrefjord/Dumbefjord - 26 inhabitants
- Indrevær/Utvær - 11 inhabitants
- Krakhella - 6 inhabitants
- Losnegard - 4 inhabitants

== Geography ==
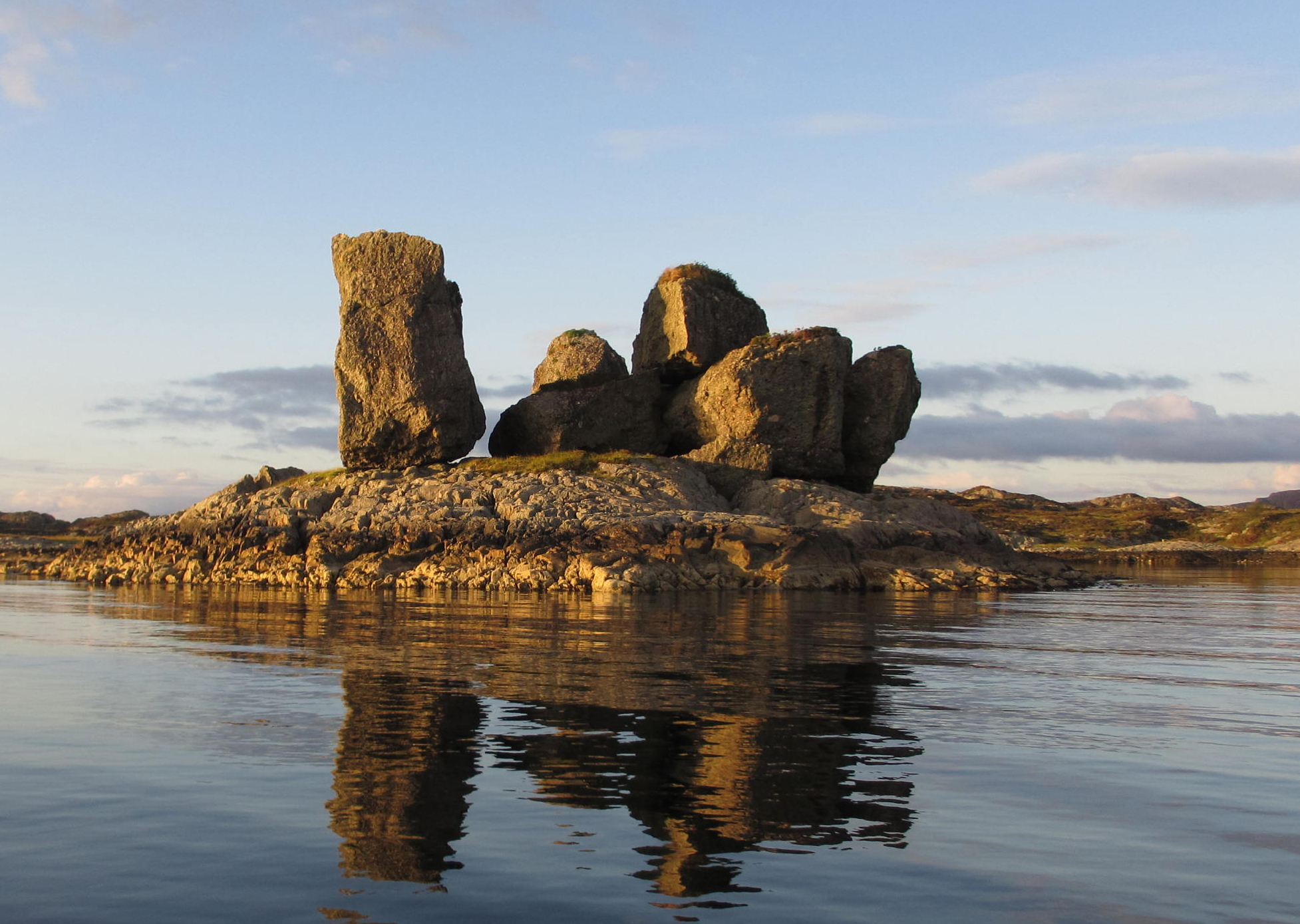
Rock formation in northern Solund

Solund Municipality is an island municipality made up of over 1,000 islands. The two largest islands are Sula and Ytre Sula. Other islands are Losna, Steinsundøyna, Nesøyna, Ospa, Rånøyna, Færøyna, Lågøyna, and Hågøyna. The westernmost point in Norway is Holmebåen in the tiny Utvær islands which are mostly uninhabited. Utvær Lighthouse is located at Utvær. The highest point in the municipality is the 568.67-metre (1,865.7 ft) tall mountain Krakhellenipa on the island of Sula.

Solund is bordered to the north by Askvoll Municipality, to the east by Fjaler Municipality and Hyllestad Municipality, to the south by Gulen Municipality, and to the west by the North Sea. The Sognesjøen strait runs along the southern border of the municipality. It is the main connection between the sea and the large Sognefjorden. The mouth of the Sognefjorden lies just east of Solund Municipality.

== Economy ==
Fishing is the most important industry in Solund. Solund Verft is the largest industrial business with 21 employees working on the maintenance, reconstruction, and repair of ships. Solund is popular with boaters with its myriad exciting islands and also attracts numerous tourists looking for outdoor recreation and fishing. Utvær island and the Utvær Lighthouse is a popular destination for tourists during the summer.

== Attractions ==
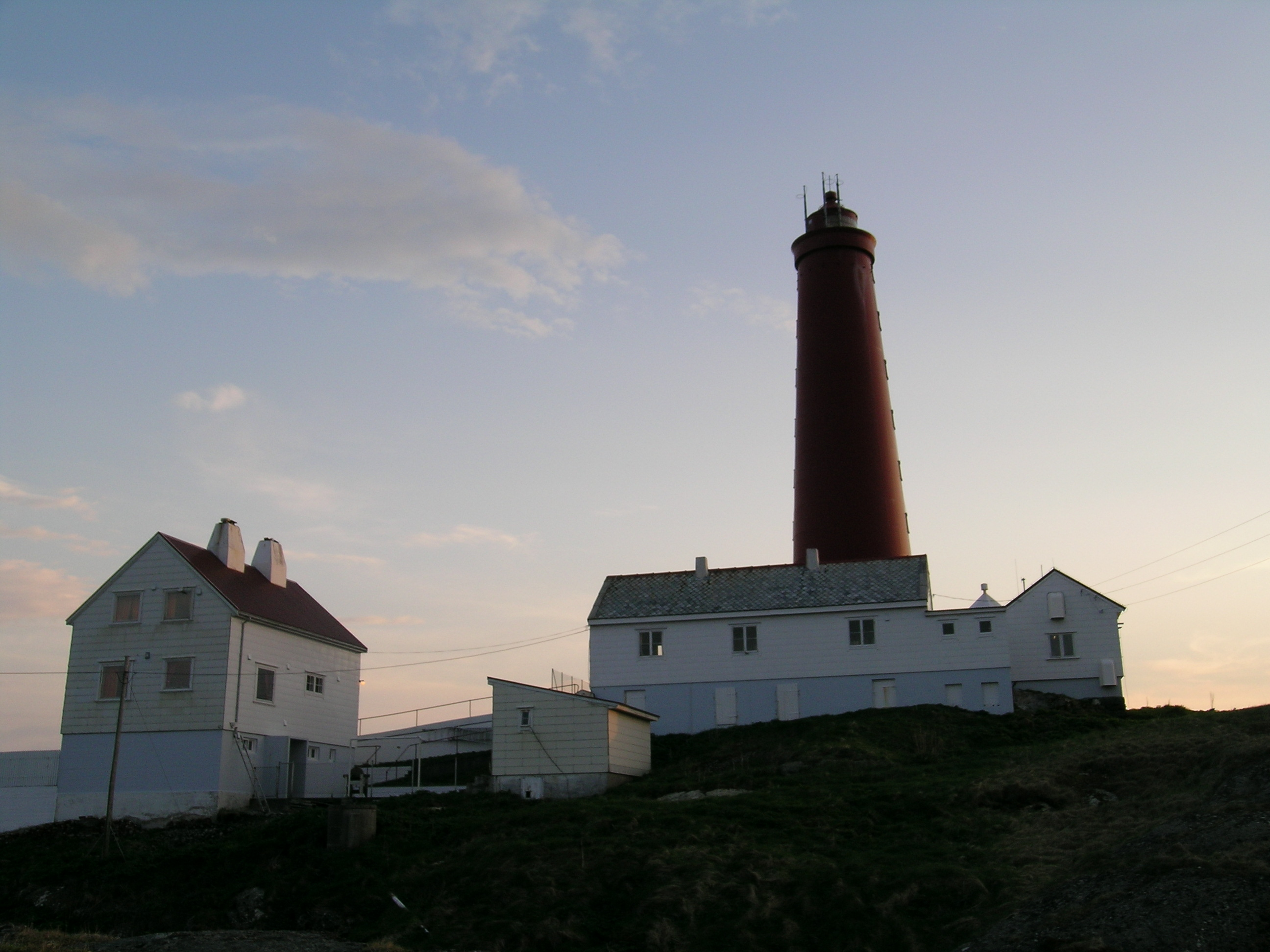
Utvær Lighthouse

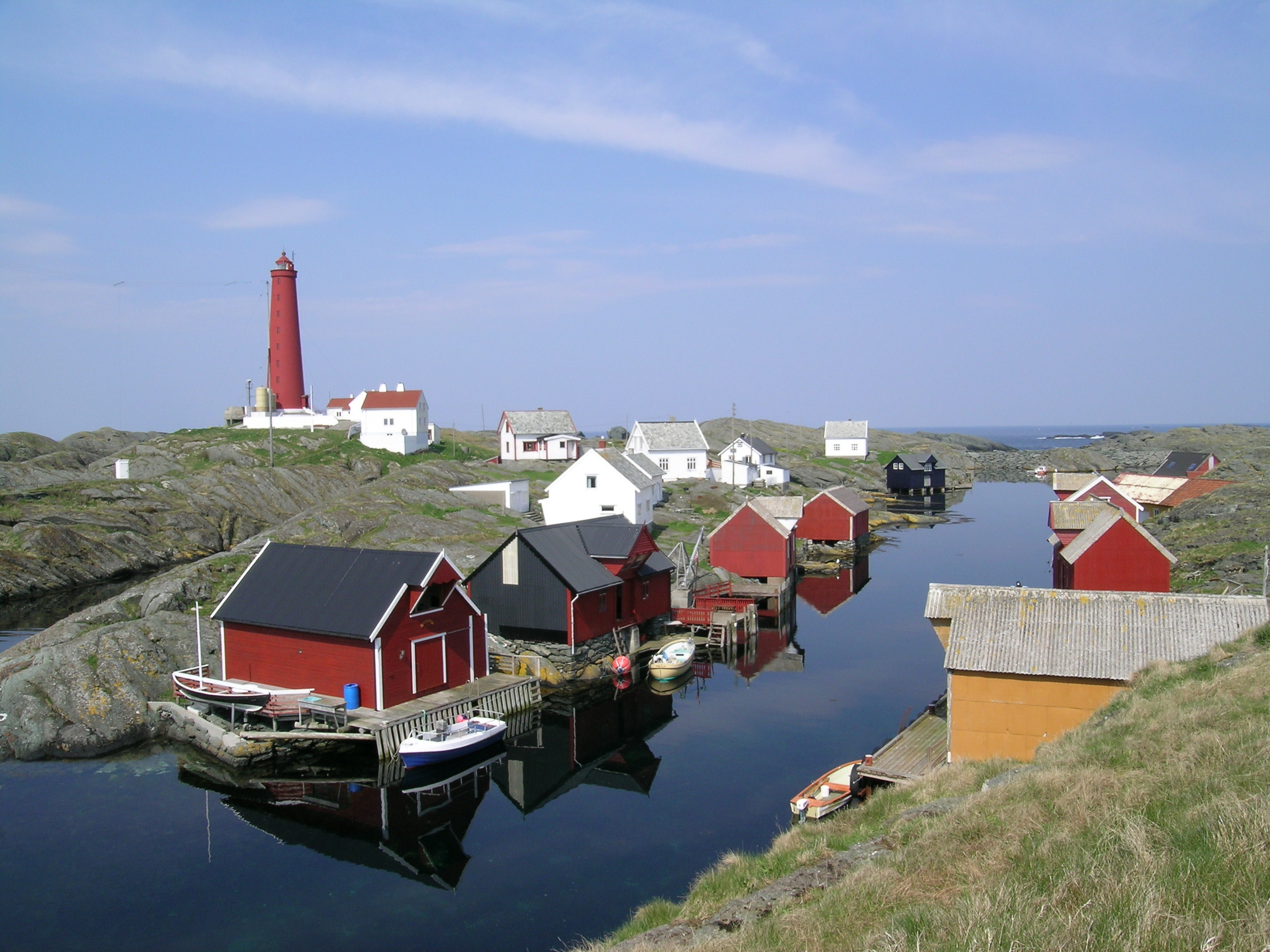
Utvær island

=== Gåsvær ===
Gåsvær is among the outermost islands of northern Solund. It is far west out at sea between the Lågøyfjorden and the Gåsværosen river outlet. The fishing banks are just off the island's coastline, and Gåsvær most probably has a long history of trade. In 1767, the island had both its own guesthouse and pub. Over the past century, the islanders have made their living from fishing and agriculture, and in more modern times, taking passengers over the waters and tourism. The oldest section of the characteristic main house dates back to the 18th century, while another section was built using timber from a shipwrecked sailing ship.

=== Utvær ===
One cannot travel any further west in Norway and still be on solid ground. There are no longer any permanent residents on the island of Utvær, but there are always two people on duty at the lighthouse. To visit Utvær one has to travel by boat. There is a service available on request from Kolgrov all year round. In the summer season there is a scheduled service with departures from Hardbakke, Eivindvik, and Korssund.

The County Governor of Vestland declared Utvær to be a nature reserve. This decision applies to the Utvær island group and surrounding sea. An exception is made for the island of Utvær itself and the sea immediately around it since people live and work there. The Norwegian Riksantikvaren has made a proposal to preserve the lighthouse itself.

In the Middle Ages, Utvær Chapel was located to the south of the existing settlement. It is somewhat uncertain when the chapel was built. The first written references to if appear in the work of Bjørgynar Kalveskinn from 1320. The chapel had an income from gifts and fishing tithes. In the 17th century the chapel owned 15 cows and 27 sheep that were rented out. Later on in the 17th century the chapel of Utvær was robbed by Scottish pirates.

The chapel was made of timber and was approximately 7.5 by 6.3 metres (25 ft × 21 ft), and it could seat a congregation of about 120. The chapel bell from 1641 is currently exhibited at the Heibergske Samlingar exhibition in Kaupanger. Four sermons a year were held in the chapel and the priest had to come by boat from Eivindvik. He was often stranded on the islands nearer the mainland as a result of bad weather. In 1718 the chapel was moved into the island of Husøy (Husøy Chapel). It was pulled down at the end of the 19th century when Straumen church was inaugurated.

The lighthouse burned down in February 1945 during an allied air attack during World War II. The lighthouse was reconstructed from 1948 to 1952. The lighthouse itself took on a different form from previously and the "balcony" on the top was one storey lower.

=== Arboretum ===
The Coastal Arboretum in Hardbakke is a collection of trees and plants of largely indigenous species. There are 60 different species planted there. The rhododendron collection is a sight to behold in early summer. Integrated into the arboretum, there is a 5-kilometre (3.1 mi) long footpath over a variety of terrain with a wonderful view over the outer Sognefjord. There is also a marked footpath up to the top of Ravnenipa mountain.

== Notable people ==
- Mimi Sverdrup Lunden (1894 in Sulen – 1955), an educator, non-fiction writer, and proponent for women's rights
- Einar Sverdrup (1895 in Solund – 1942), a mining engineer who was killed in action during Operation Fritham
- Paul Vårdal (1925 in Solund – 2010), an accountant and a pioneer of accounting education in Norway
