= Nikka Vonen =

Norwegian educator, folklorist and author (1836–1933)

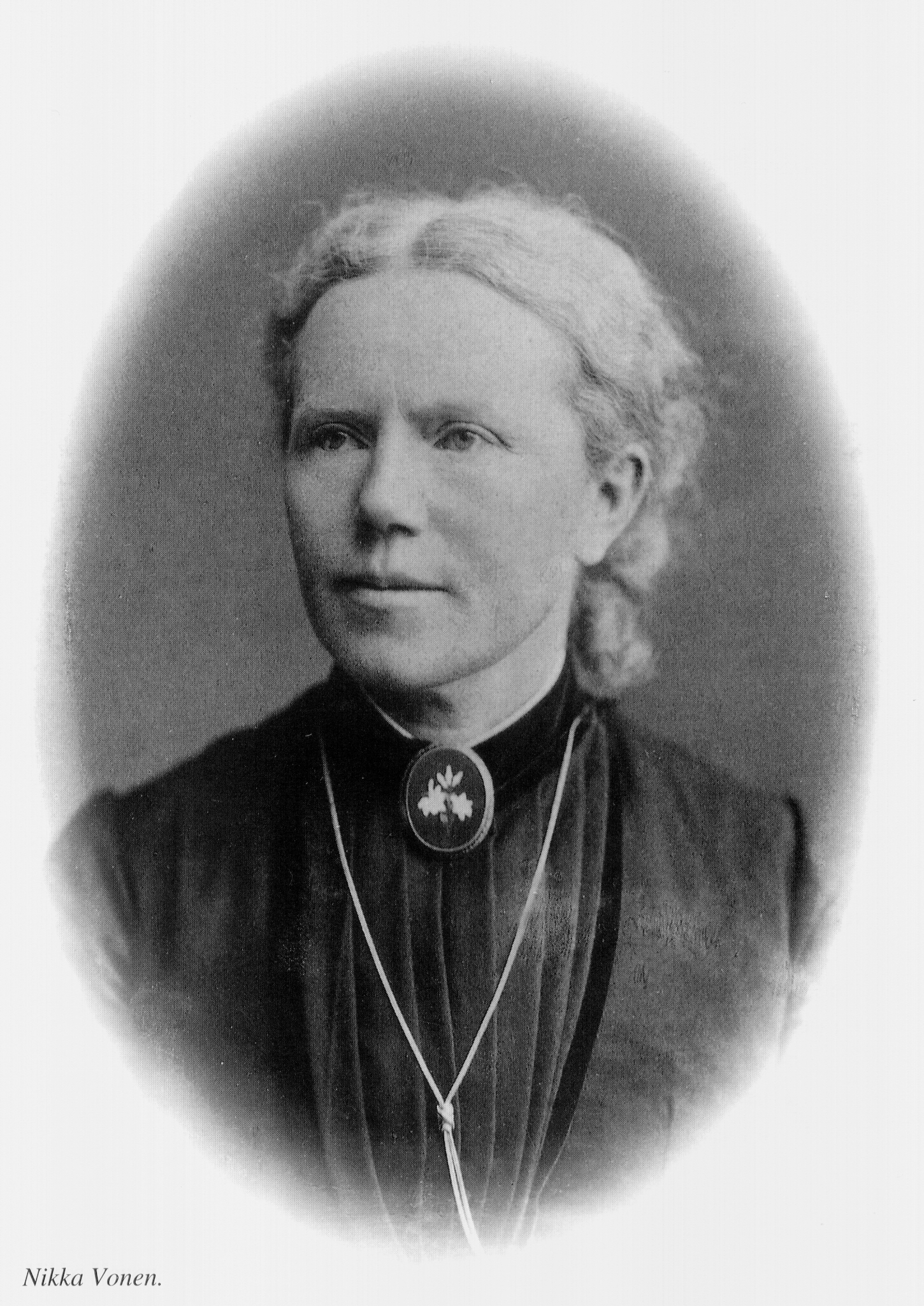
- Born: 14 November 1836; Ytre Holmedal, Norway
- Died: 29 November 1933 (aged 97)
- Occupations: educator, folklorist and author

Nikka Vonen (14 November 1836 – 29 November 1933) was a Norwegian educator, folklorist and author.

== Personal life ==
Vonen was born in Dale i Sunnfjord (in the present-day Fjaler Municipality) to blacksmith, gunsmith, watchmaker, farmer and guesthouse host Bertel Johannesson Vonen and midwife Berthe Helene Skjærdal.

== Career ==
Vonen's first folklore tales were printed anonymously in 1865–66, and she had 24 tales printed in Dølen in 1868–69, under the headers "Æventyr fraa Sunnfjord" and "Segner fraa Sunnfjord, fortalde av gamle Synnve". She wrote using Danish language herself, but supported the Nynorsk movement, and was the first female member of the Nynorsk language society Vestmannalaget. She attended several "girls' schools" over the years, and graduated as teacher from Nissen's Girls' School in the late 1860s. She co-founded a school for girls in Dale in 1869, Nikka Vonens Pigeinstitutt, and chaired the school from 1871 to 1907. Vonen made hiking trips in Jotunheimen along with mountain pioneers such as Emanuel Mohn, Ernst Sars and William Cecil Slingsby, and she was among the first women to ascend Galdhøpiggen. She contributed to the women's magazine Urd, and supported the movement for women's rights.

She was awarded King Oscar II's Medal of Merit in gold.
