= Dale Church (Fjaler) =

Church in Vestland, Norway

- Dale kyrkje
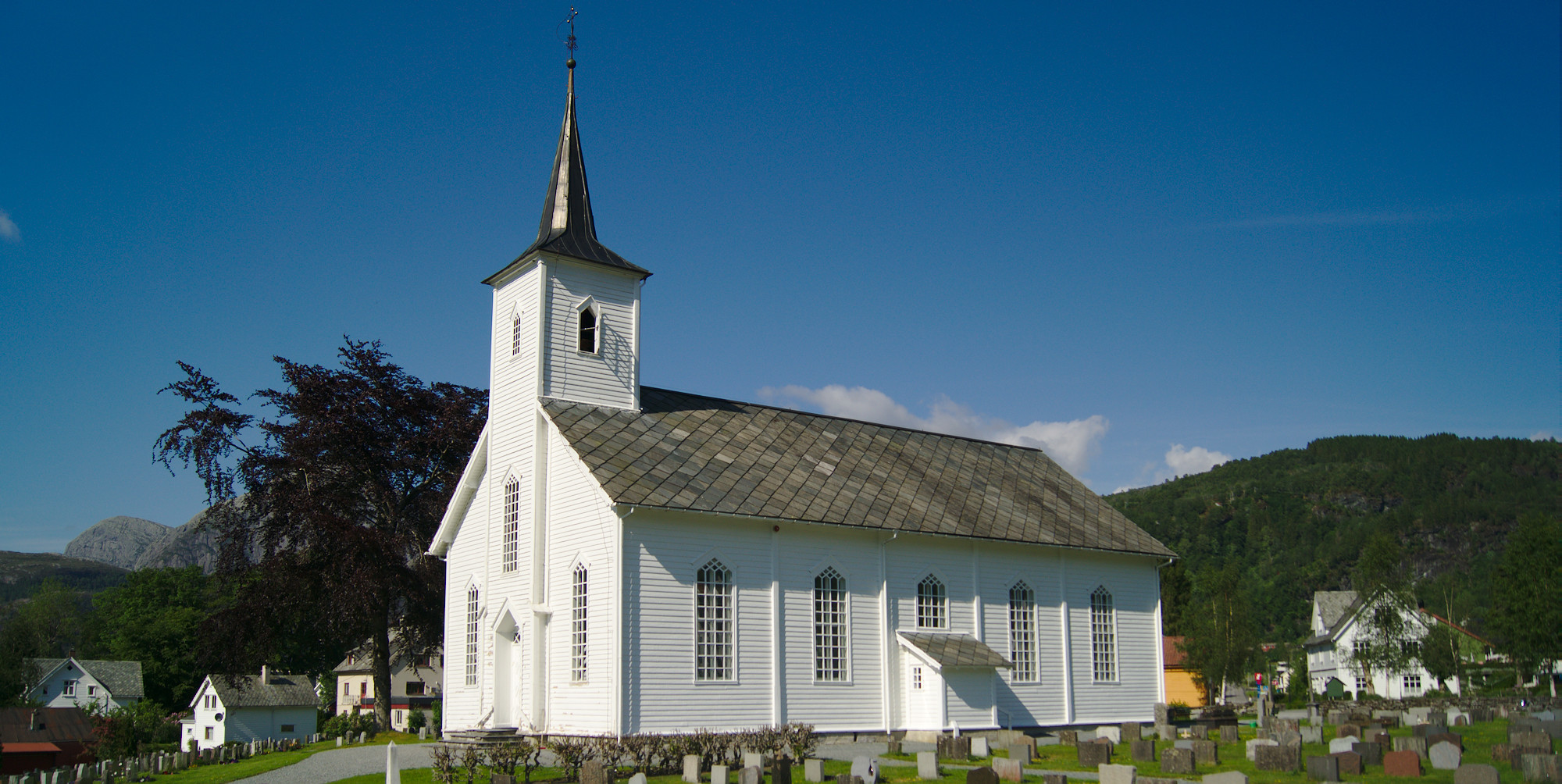
- View of the church
- Dale Church
- 61.3623°N 5.3970°E
- Location: Fjaler Municipality, Vestland
- Country: Norway
- Denomination: Church of Norway
- Churchmanship: Evangelical Lutheran

History
- Status: Parish church
- Founded: 13th century
- Consecrated: 24 November 1864

Architecture
- Functional status: Active
- Architectural type: Long church
- Completed: 1864 (162 years ago)

Specifications
- Capacity: 510
- Materials: Wood

Administration
- Diocese: Bjørgvin bispedømme
- Deanery: Sunnfjord prosti
- Parish: Fjaler
- Norwegian Cultural Heritage Site
- Type: Church
- Status: Listed
- ID: 84014

Dale Church (Norwegian: Dale kyrkje) is a parish church of the Church of Norway in Fjaler Municipality in Vestland county, Norway. It is located in the village of Dale. It is one of two churches for the Fjaler parish which is part of the Sunnfjord prosti (deanery) in the Diocese of Bjørgvin. The white, wooden church was built in a long church design in 1864 by the builder Johannes Øvsthus. The church seats about 510 people.

== History ==
There are no accurate information confirming when the first church was built in Dale. The first church was probably a wooden stave church that was likely built during the 13th century. Historical records from 1330 name a "Dalskirkiu", probably referring to the church in Dale. The baptismal font in the present church is dated as 1250-1300 AD, so it is likely that the church was built in the mid- to late-13th century. The old medieval church was demolished in 1593 to make room for a new church: a tarred, timber-framed long church. The new church had a nave that measured about 16 by 10 metres (52 ft × 33 ft) and the choir measured about 5.5 by 6.5 metres (18 ft × 21 ft). The famous painter Anders Askevold painted an oil painting from Dalsbygda in 1853 which includes that church.

In 1727, all the churches in the parish were sold during the Norwegian church auction by the King to help pay off debts for the Great Northern War. After this, the church was privately owned. In 1860, the owner of Dale Church gave the church back to the parish for free. At that time, the parish council decided that the church was too small and in poor condition, so it was torn down in 1863 and a new church was completed on the same site during the following year. Johannes Øvsthus was the builder for the new church, however it is unknown who actually designed the building. The new church was consecrated on 24 November 1864 by the Dean Johan Carl Christie.

== Media gallery ==
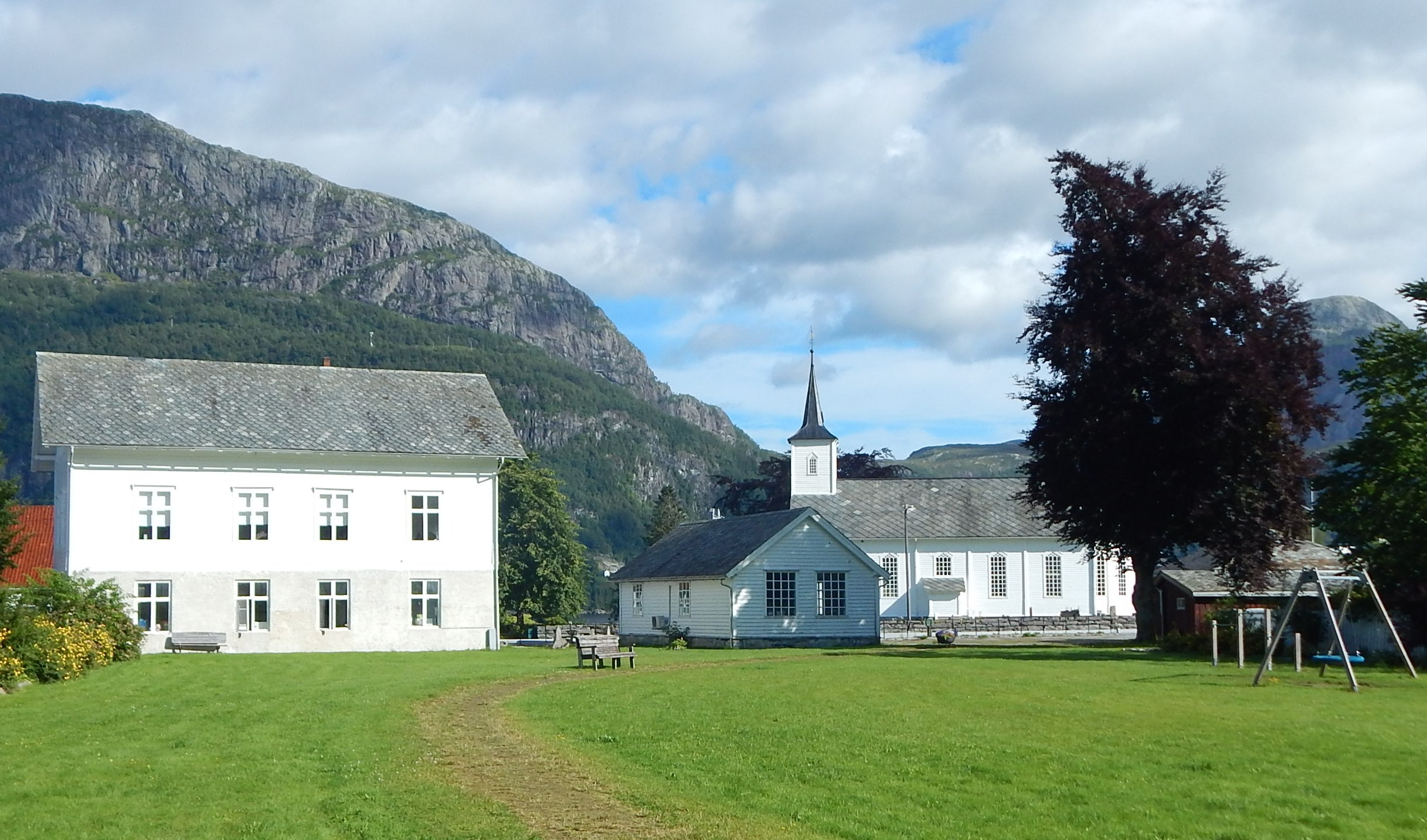

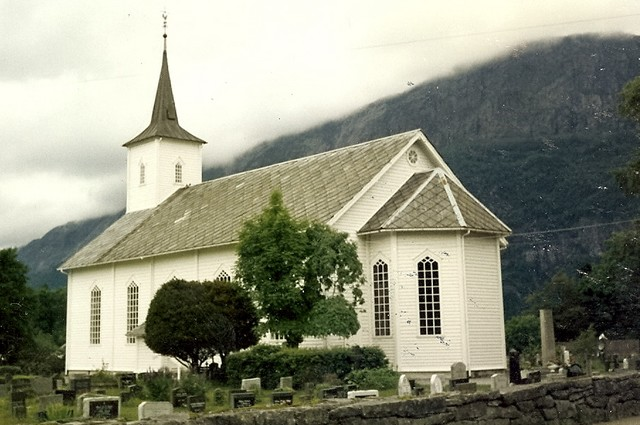

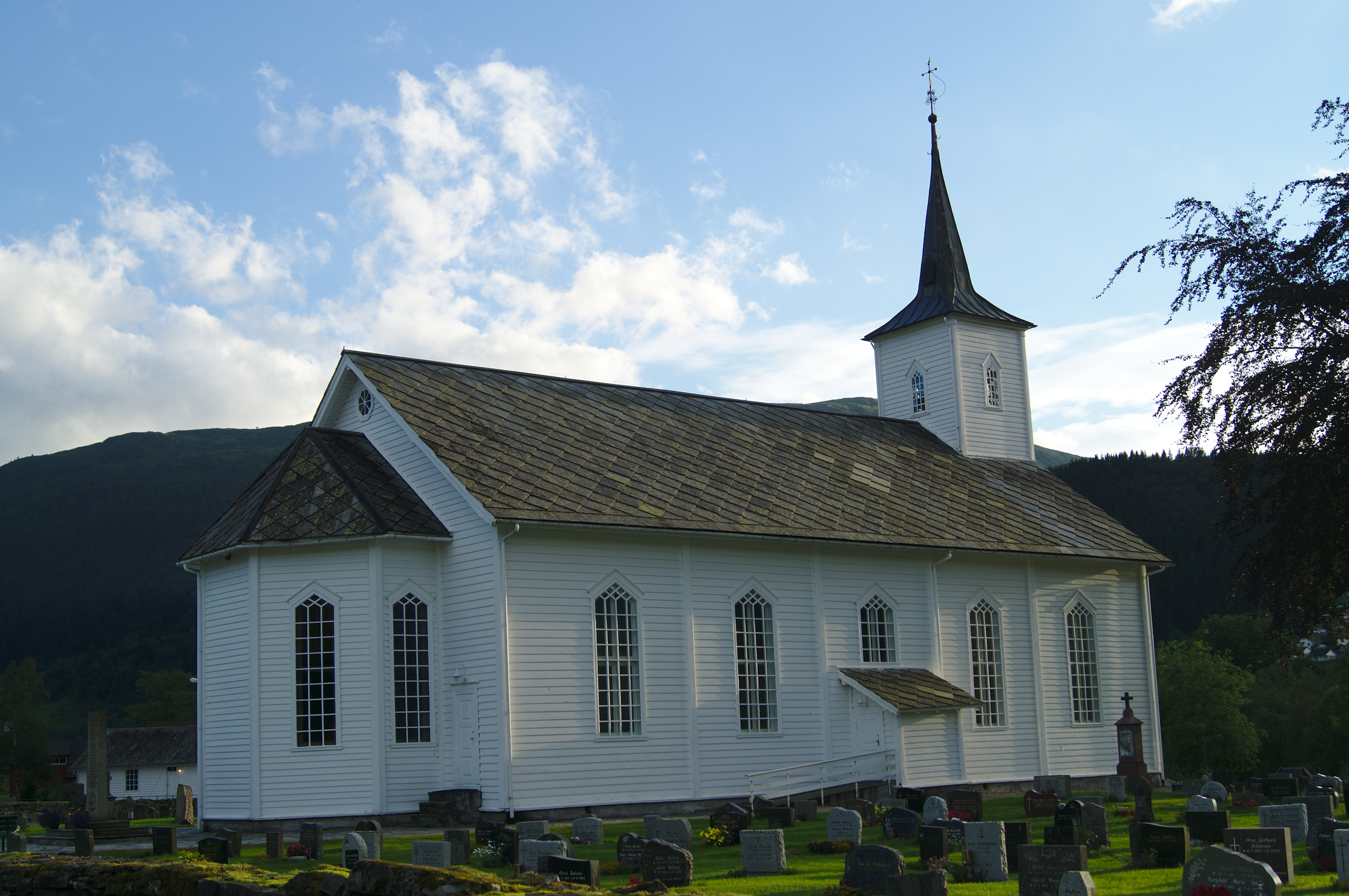

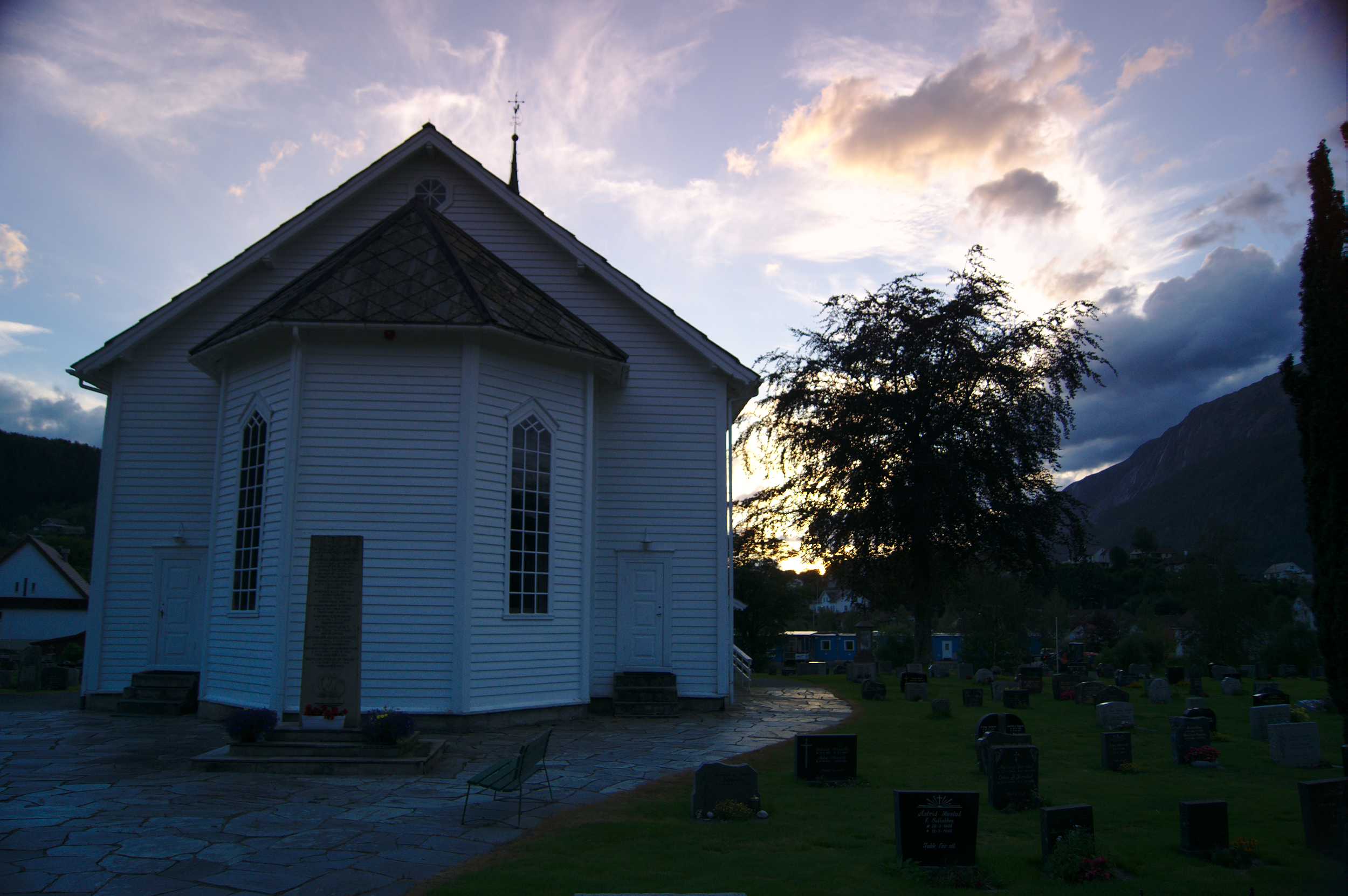

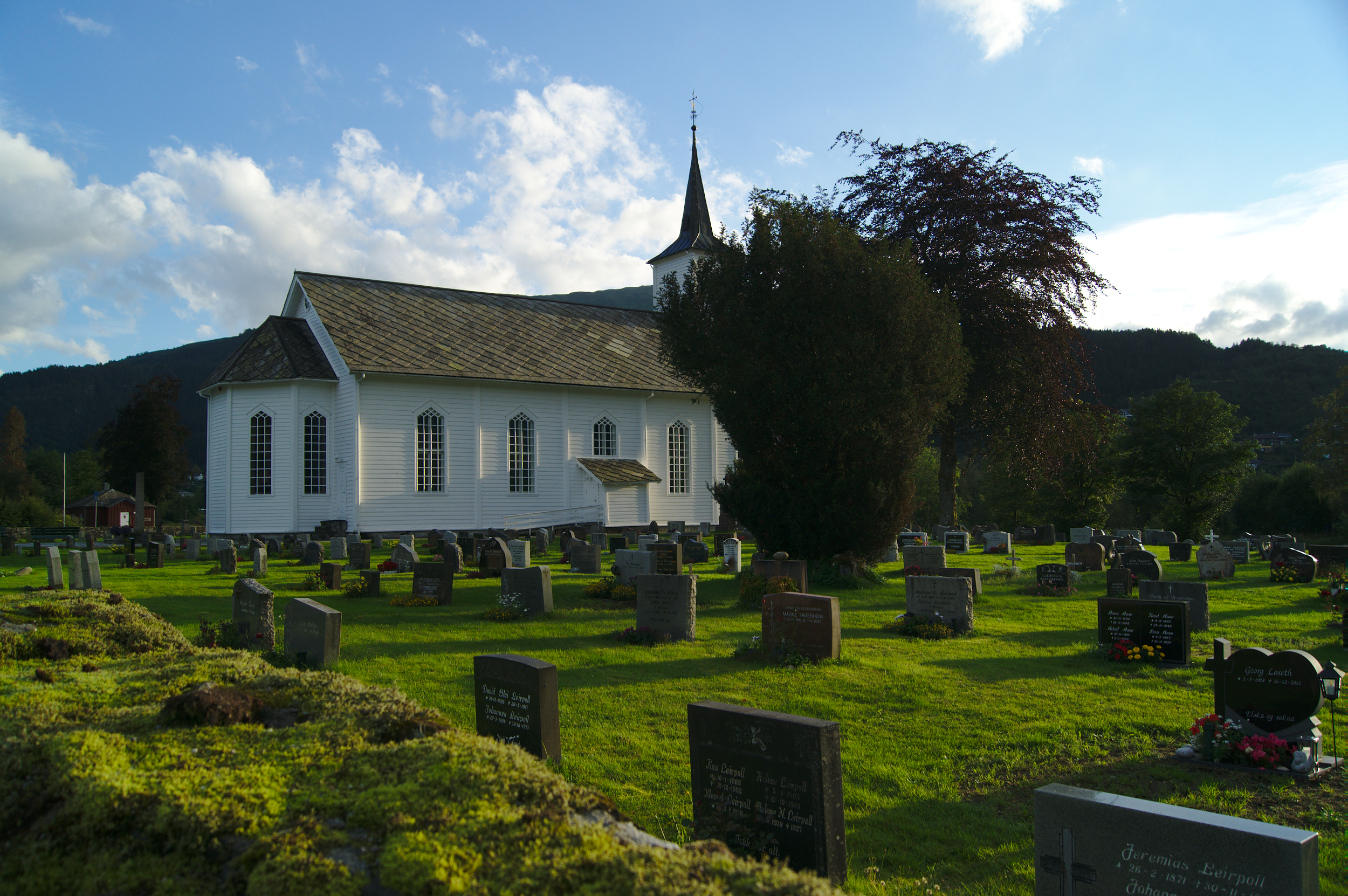

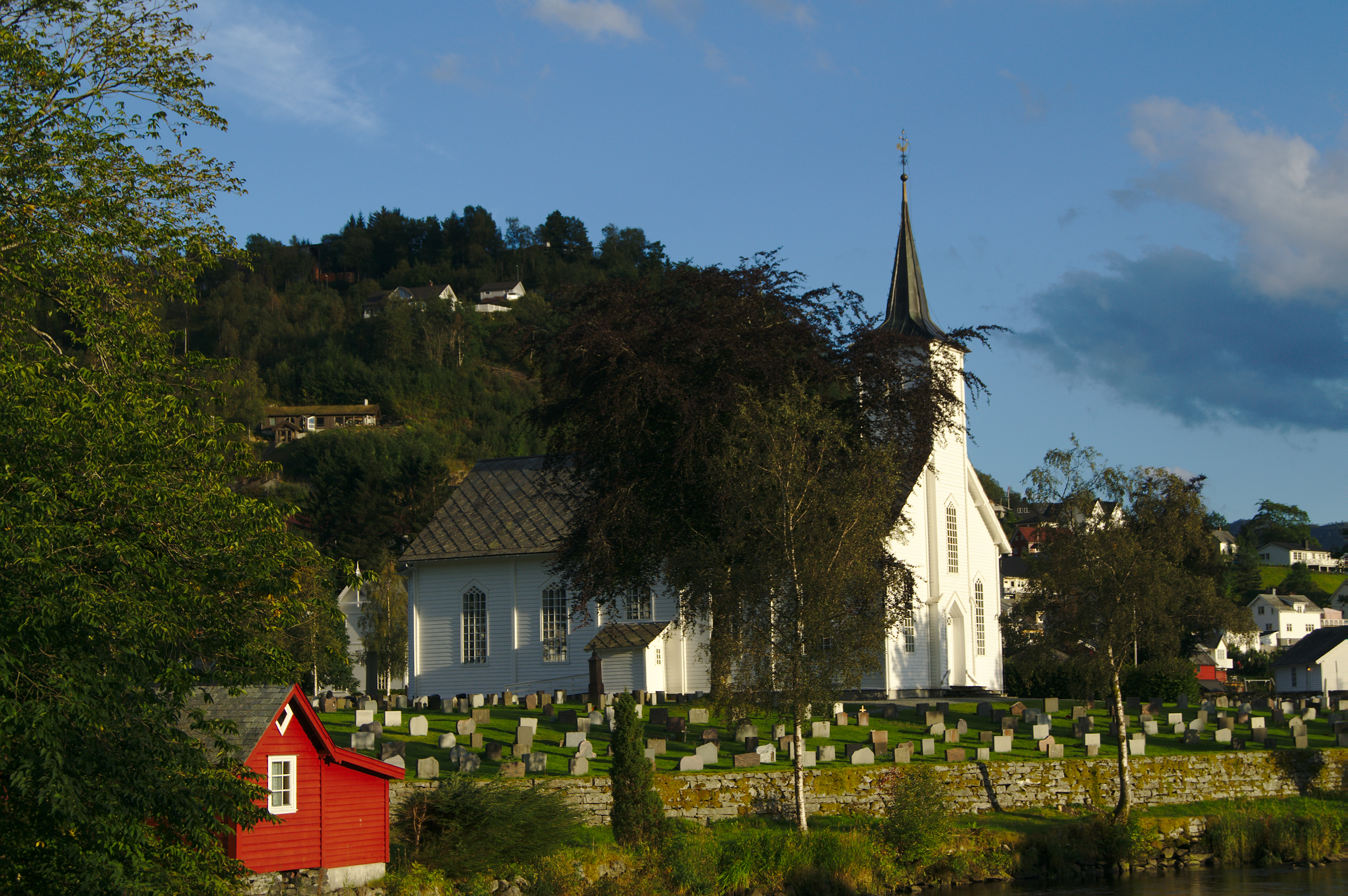

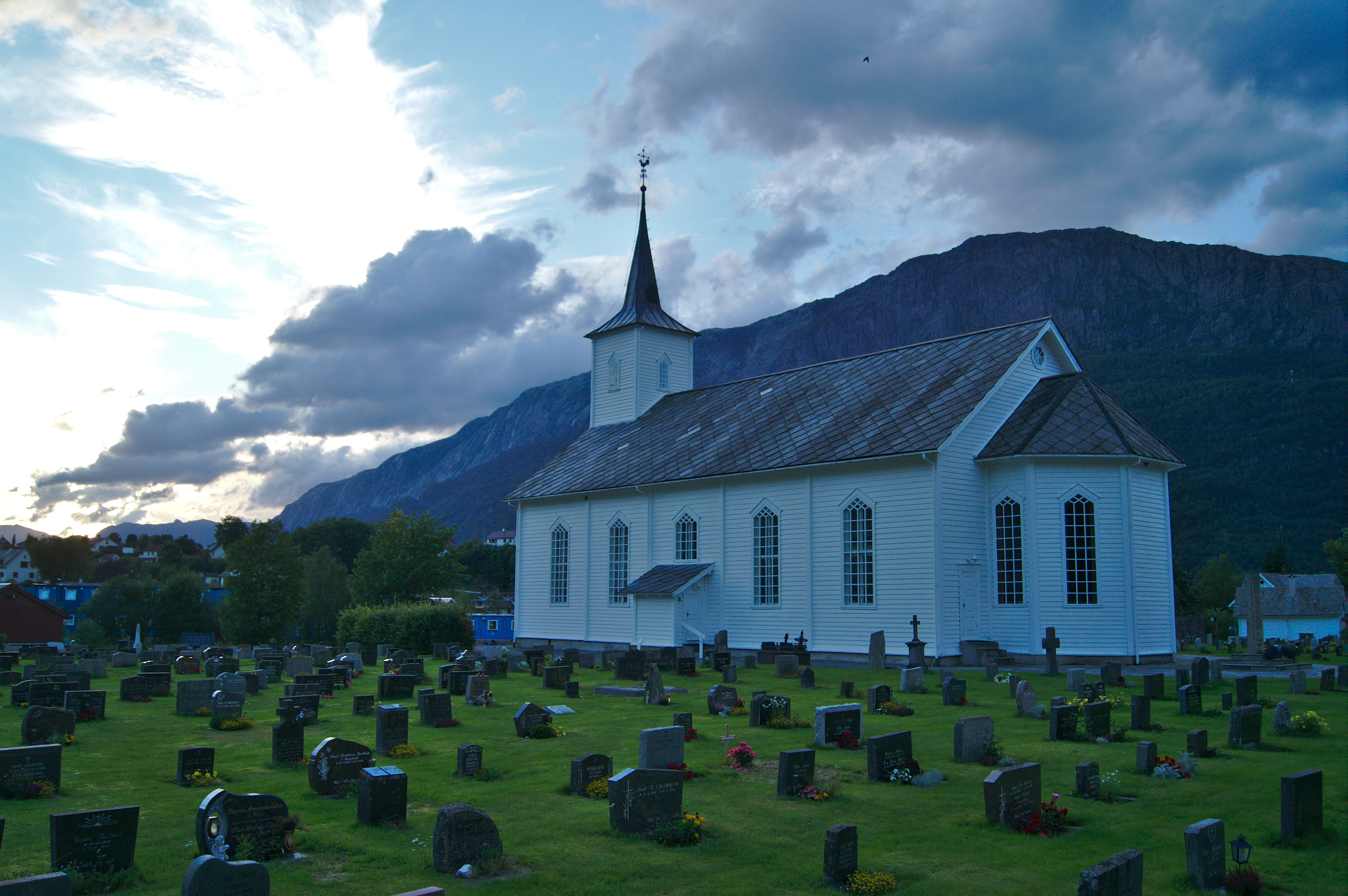

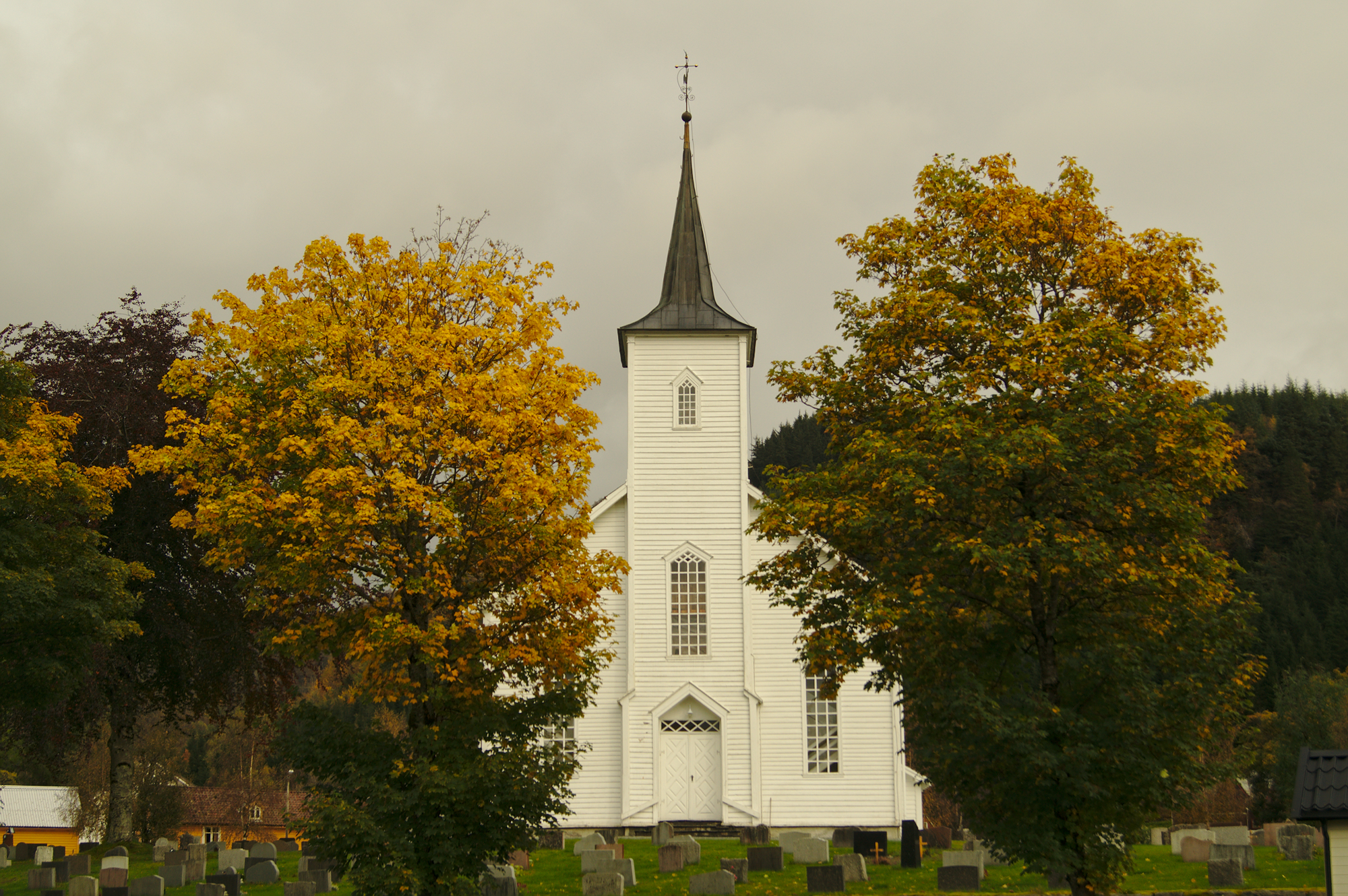

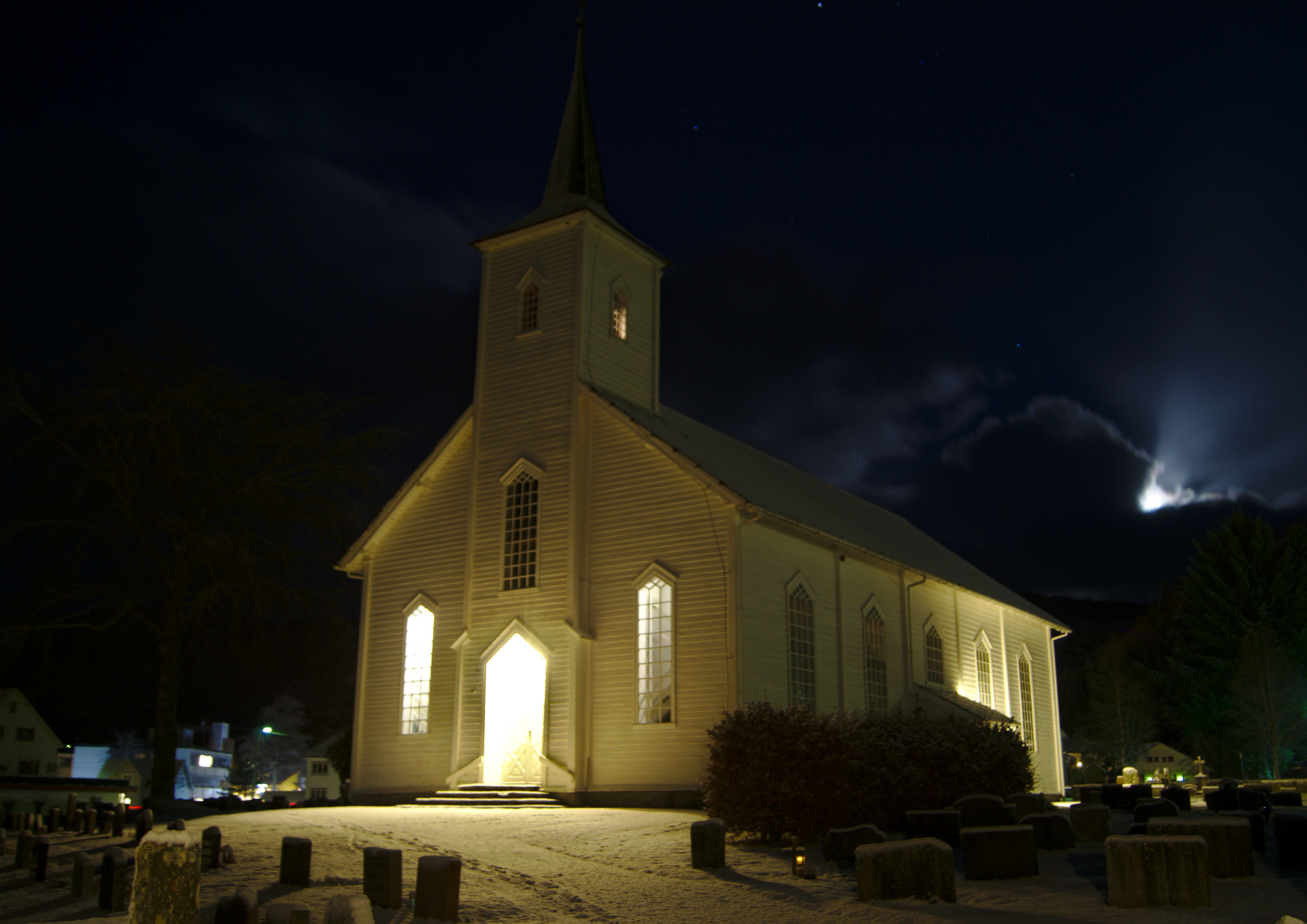

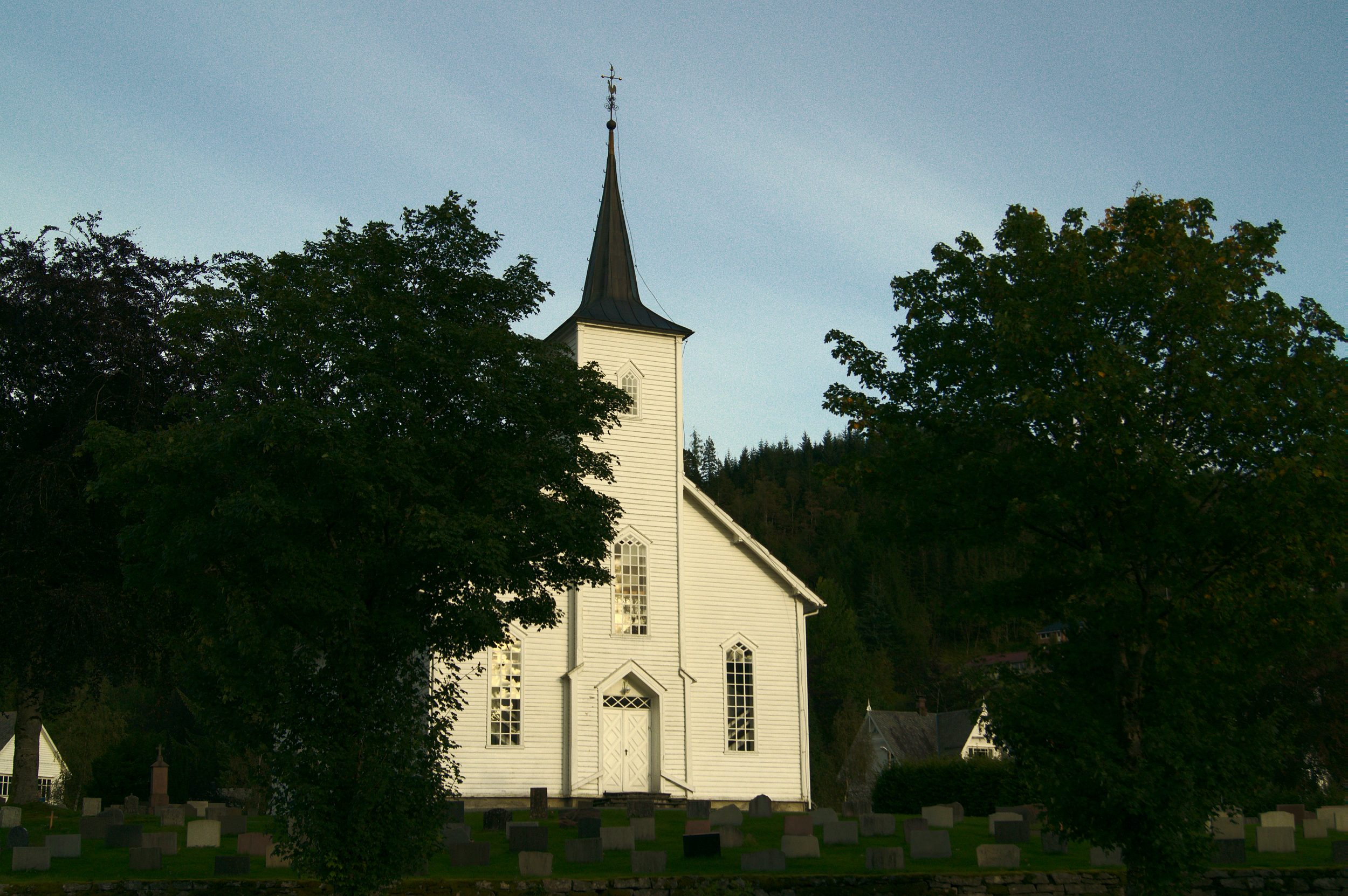

== See also ==
- List of churches in Bjørgvin
