= Flekke =

Village in Fjaler Municipality, Norway

- Village
- Interactive map of Flekke
- Location within Vestland Location within Norway
- Coordinates: 61.31535°N 5.36336°E
- Country: Norway
- Region: Western Norway
- County: Vestland
- District: Sunnfjord
- Municipality: Fjaler Municipality

Area
  - Total: 0.11 km^{2} (0.042 sq mi)
- Elevation: 5 m (16 ft)

Population (2025)
  - Total: 286
  - Density: 2,600/km^{2} (6,700/sq mi)
- Time zone: UTC+01:00 (CET)
  - Summer (DST): UTC+02:00 (CEST)
- Post Code: 6968 Flekke

Flekke is a village in Fjaler Municipality in Vestland, Norway. The village is located about 6.5 kilometres (4.0 mi) south of the municipal center of Dale.

The village is situated at the end of the Flekkefjorden, an arm of the Dalsfjorden. The village of Guddal lies about 20 kilometres (12 mi) to the southeast in the Guddalen valley. A few kilometers north of Flekke, lies the village of Haugland, while the bay continues south to Trollvika and a narrow strait into Flosjøen.

The 0.11-square-kilometre (27-acre) village of Flekke has a population (2025) of 286, giving the village a population density of 2,699 inhabitants per square kilometre (6,990/sq mi).

UWC Red Cross Nordic is located next to the Haugland Rehabilitation Center, just 2.5 kilometres (1.6 mi) north of Flekke. Haugland Rehabilitation Centre is owned by the Red Cross District of Sogn og Fjordane, and is part of the Norwegian Health Care System.
