= Guddal =

Village in Fjaler Municipality, Norway

- Village
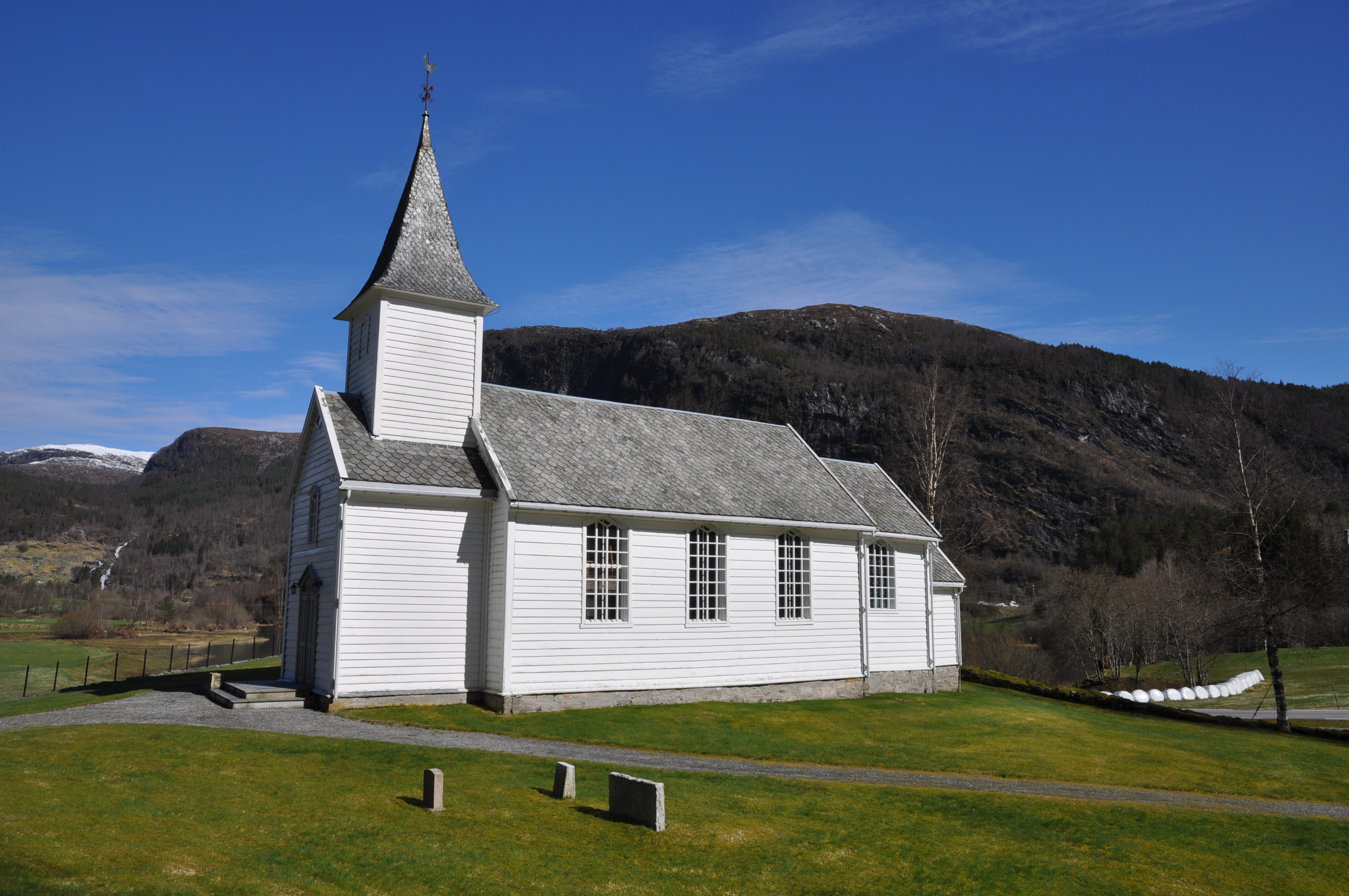
- Guddal Church
- Interactive map of Guddal
- Location within Vestland Location within Norway
- Coordinates: 61.24644°N 5.53015°E
- Country: Norway
- Region: Western Norway
- County: Vestland
- District: Sunnfjord
- Municipality: Fjaler Municipality
- Elevation: 78 m (256 ft)
- Time zone: UTC+01:00 (CET)
  - Summer (DST): UTC+02:00 (CEST)
- Post Code: 6966 Guddal

Guddal is a village in Fjaler Municipality in Vestland county, Norway. The village is located in the Guddalen valley, about 20 kilometres (12 mi) southeast of the village of Flekke. The village of Vadheim (in Høyanger Municipality) lies about 25 kilometres (16 mi) to the southeast of Guddal. The village is the site of Guddal Church, which serves the whole valley. The local economy is centered on agriculture and forestry.
