= Hellevik Chapel =

Church in Vestland, Norway

- Hellevik bedehuskapell
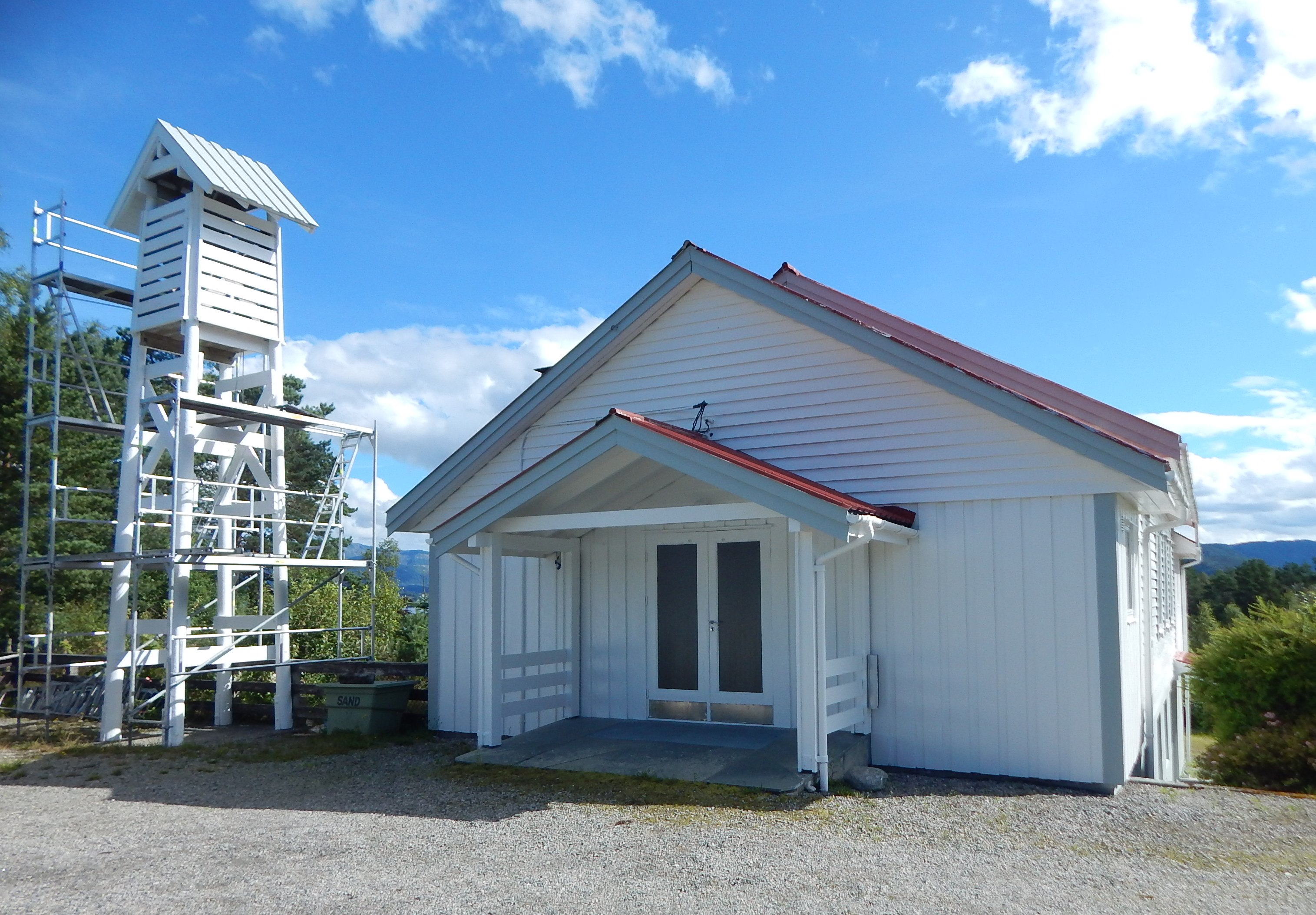
- View of the chapel
- Hellevik Chapel
- 61.30194°N 5.158611°E
- Location: Fjaler Municipality, Vestland
- Country: Norway
- Denomination: Church of Norway
- Churchmanship: Evangelical Lutheran

History
- Status: Chapel
- Founded: 1978
- Consecrated: 1 October 1978

Architecture
- Functional status: Active
- Architect(s): Johannes Brendehaug and Jonas Lone
- Architectural type: Long church
- Completed: 1978 (48 years ago)

Specifications
- Capacity: 120
- Materials: Wood

Administration
- Diocese: Bjørgvin bispedømme
- Deanery: Sunnfjord prosti
- Parish: Fjaler

Hellevik Chapel (Norwegian: Hellevik bedehuskapell) is a chapel of the Church of Norway in Fjaler Municipality in Vestland county, Norway. It is located in the village of Hellevik, on the southern shore of the Dalsfjorden. It is an annex chapel in the Fjaler parish which is part of the Sunnfjord prosti (deanery) in the Diocese of Bjørgvin. The white chapel was built in a long church design in 1978. The chapel seats about 120 people.

== History ==
The planning process is said to have taken forty years, with the first fundraising held in the middle of the 1930s. The plot was donated in 1965, the basement floor was ready in 1977. The white chapel with a red roof was completed and consecrated on 1 October 1978 by the local Dean Anders Myklebust. Two local men, John Brendehaug and Jonas Lone, were the architects. The chapel was built at a time when Hellevik belonged to Holmedal parish, with the parish church (Holmedal Church) on the north side of the fjord. In 1991, when the north side of Holmedal was transferred to Askvoll Municipality, Hellevik Chapel was incorporated in Fjaler parish.

== See also ==
- List of churches in Bjørgvin
