= Dalsfjord Bridge =

Dalsfjord Bridge Dalsfjordbrua
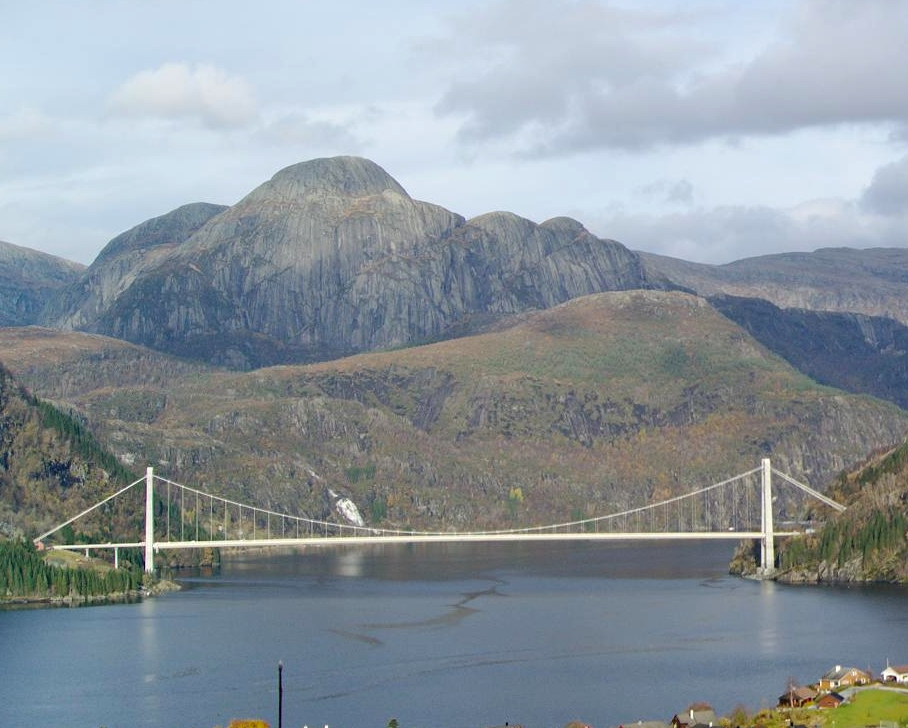
- View of the bridge
- Coordinates: 61°22′25″N 5°23′47″E
- Carries: Fv609
- Crosses: Dalsfjorden
- Locale: Fjaler and Askvoll

Characteristics
- Design: Suspension bridge
- Material: Concrete
- Total length: 619 metres (2,031 ft)
- Width: 12 metres (39 ft)
- Height: 101 metres (331 ft)
- Longest span: 523 metres (1,716 ft)
- Clearance below: 35 metres (115 ft)

History
- Opened: 14 Dec 2013

Location
- Interactive map of Dalsfjord Bridge

The Dalsfjord Bridge is a suspension bridge over the Dalsfjorden in Vestland county, Norway. The bridge connects Fjaler Municipality and Askvoll Municipality on either side of the fjord. The suspension bridge has a main span of 523 metres (1,716 ft) and the bridge towers are 101 metres (331 ft) high. It was opened on 14 December 2013. The bridge was built as part of the Dalsfjord Connection project and is part of Norwegian County Road 609. On the west side, the road enters the Otterstein Tunnel, while on the east side of the bridge the road enters a 290-metre (950 ft) tunnel arm into a roundabout inside the Nishammart Tunnel.

== History ==
The bridge plans date back to the 1960s and a desire for a road connection between the villages of Askvoll and Dale and the town of Førde with a road on the north side of the Dalsfjorden. Among other things, 1,200 signatures were collected in support of the project in 1962. Later, it was decided that a bridge would be built across the Dalsfjorden. In 1975, construction of the road started from the ferry dock at Eikenes and inwards the fjord towards Otterstein, where the Dalsfjord bridge was to be built over to Nishammar on the south side. After 4 kilometres (2.5 mi) of road and one 500-metre (1,600 ft) tunnel had been built, roadwork was stopped in 1979. In 1981, the project was put on hold even though it had already cost 13 million kr and the new road ended at a rock wall. During the 1990s, the road project was discussed further, but it wasn't until 2010 when the project was resumed. The road opened in 2013.

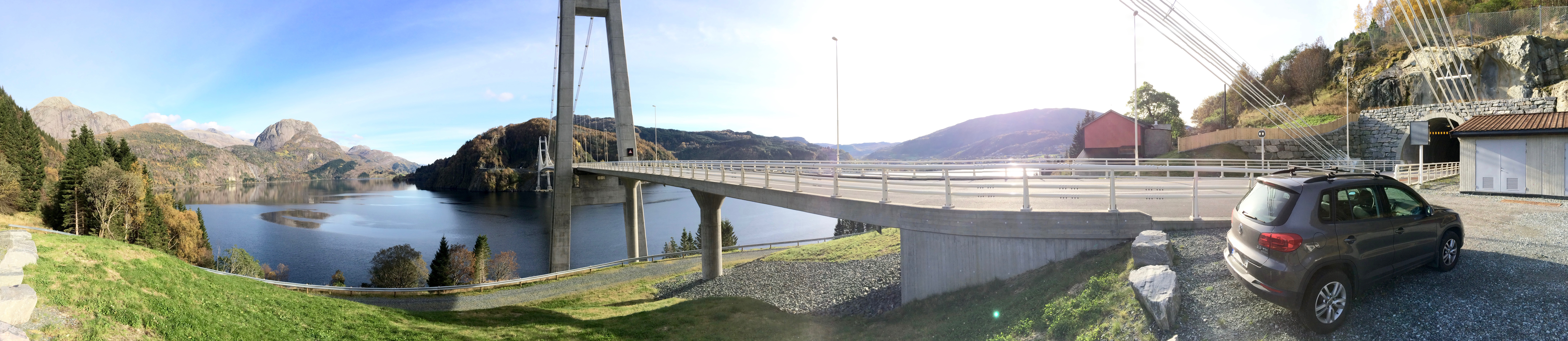
