= Jakob Sande =

Norwegian writer, poet and folk singer (1906–1967)

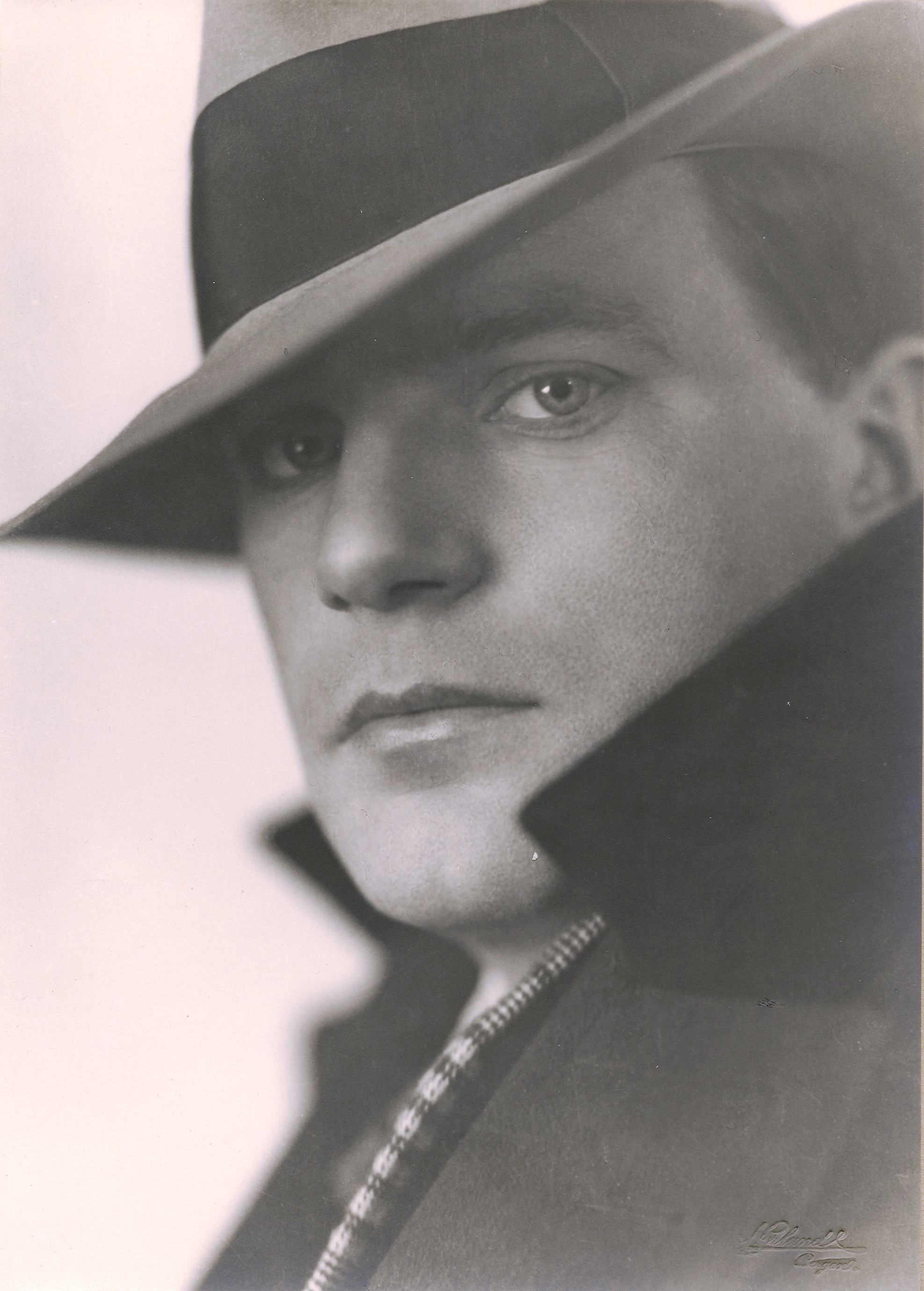

Background information
- Born: 1 December 1906; Dale, Ytre Holmedal Municipality, Norway
- Died: 16 March 1967 (aged 60)
- Occupations: writer, poet and folk singer
- Years active: 1929–1965

Jakob Sande (1 December 1906 – 16 March 1967) was a Norwegian writer, poet and folk singer from Dale in Sunnfjord. His parents were Andreas Sande and Ragna Margrete (born Barsnes). He married Solveig Ytterlid in 1942 and they had a daughter, Siri, in 1943.

He wrote all his texts in Nynorsk, one of the two official Norwegian written language forms. His work helped secure a special place on the Norwegian culture-scene for Fjaler Municipality.

== Biography ==
Sande was born on 1 December 1906 in Dale, a village in Ytre Holmedal Municipality in Nordre Bergehus county, Norway. His parents, Anders (father) and Ragna Margrete (mother), lived at Klokkargarden.

His career as a writer spanned from 1929 to 1967. He completed his cand philol exam in 1931, but then he went to work at sea as he had been drawn to that life from early on. In 1934 he started to work as a lector in Fredrikstad. After World War II he moved to the same position at Ullern gymnas in Oslo.

In 1963, he decided to quit teaching and devote his life to writing. That year he received a stipend of 15,000 kr and was promised the same for 1964 and 1965.

His later years were marked by ill health. He died on 16 March 1967 at age 61.

== Writings ==
Sande's first poems were published in 1929 in a volume titled Svarte næter (Black Nights). The book was not welcomed by conservative Christians because of language deemed "straightforward" and "foul" for that time. Other readers loved the work's sense of humor, irony, and his wonderful descriptions of nature.

His second book of poems, Storm frå vest, was published in 1931. Conservative Christians criticized this work as well, even though one of the poems, "Salme," was later used in a collection of religious poems.

In 1933, the book Frå Sundfjord til Rio (From Sunnfjord to Rio) was published. In three parts, the book described the sea, differences between the officers and the crew, bordellos, ports, and fighting in pubs.

1939 saw the publication of Krossen og sleggja (The Cross and the Sledgehammer), a collection of all his previous poems, as well as ten new ones.

One of his most famous poems, "Da Daniel drog" ("When Daniel Left") was published in the collection Guten og Grenda (The Boy and the Village). The poem is sometimes referred to as "Vesle Daniel" ("Little Daniel").

Korn og klunger was published in 1950, and Sirius in 1955.

His last book, Det kveldar på Kobbeskjer, was published in 1961.

His poems vary from a burlesque and a sometimes grotesque humor as in Kallen og katten and Likfunn to high emotionality as in Fløytelåt and Vesle Daniel

His song Det lyser i stille grender is included in most Norwegian books of hymns and is a popular Christmas song.

His poem Etter ein rangel is very famous.

Many of Jakob Sande's poems have been set to music. Two of the most popular groups who specialise in Jakob Sande lyrics are Aftenlandet and Jubelhornet.

== Awards ==
- Gyldendal's Endowment for 1952
- Dobloug Prize for 1966

== Commemoration ==
- In 2002, 35 years after his death, Sande's birth community of Dale erected a statue by sculptor Sivert Donali in tribute to Sande's poem "Vesle Daniel." Picture of Vesle Daniel statue
- In 2006 on Jacob Sande's 100 years anniversary, the Faroese singer and composer Hanus G. Johansen released an album with poems by Jakob Sande, which Hanus G. had composed melodies for. The album was called Frå leddigen – Jakob Sande-dikt i færøysk tonedrakt. The music was played by the Faroese ensemble Aldubáran.
