= Guddal Church =

Church in Vestland, Norway

- Guddal kyrkje
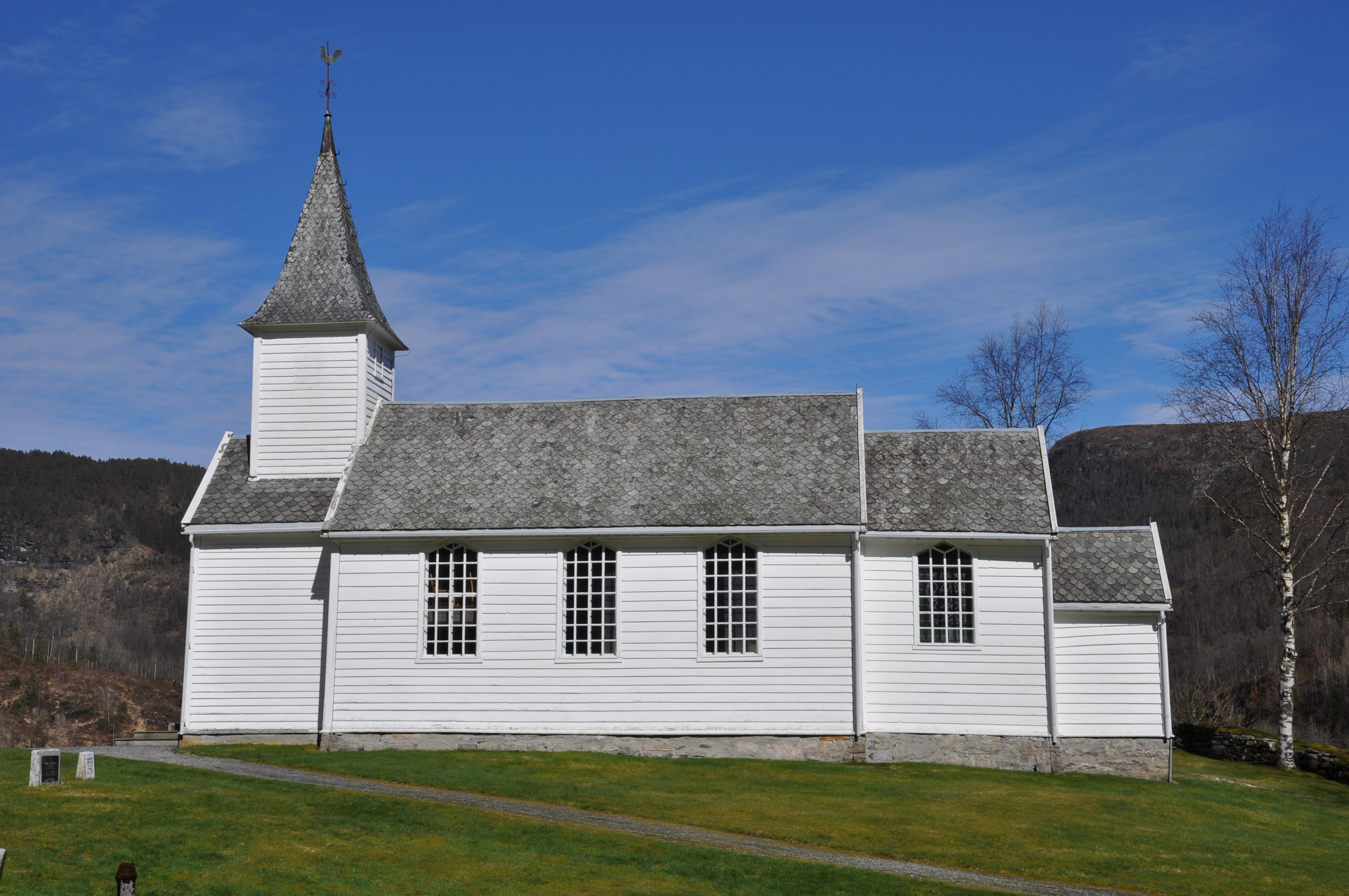
- View of the church
- Guddal Church
- 61.2463°N 5.5300°E
- Location: Fjaler Municipality, Vestland
- Country: Norway
- Denomination: Church of Norway
- Churchmanship: Evangelical Lutheran

History
- Status: Parish church
- Founded: 13th century
- Consecrated: 25 September 1870

Architecture
- Functional status: Active
- Architectural type: Long church
- Completed: 1870 (156 years ago)

Specifications
- Capacity: 135
- Materials: Wood

Administration
- Diocese: Bjørgvin bispedømme
- Deanery: Sunnfjord prosti
- Parish: Fjaler
- Norwegian Cultural Heritage Site
- Type: Church
- Status: Automatically protected
- ID: 84446

Guddal Church (Norwegian: Guddal kyrkje) is a parish church of the Church of Norway in Fjaler Municipality in Vestland county, Norway. It is located in the village of Guddal. It is one of two churches for the Fjaler parish which is part of the Sunnfjord prosti (deanery) in the Diocese of Bjørgvin. The white, wooden church was built in a long church design in 1686 using plans drawn up by an unknown architect. The church seats about 135 people.

== History ==
The earliest existing historical records of the church date back to the year 1327, but it wasn't new at that time. The first church was a wooden stave church located on the same site as the present church that was likely established during the 13th century. In 1686, the medieval church was torn down and it was replaced with a new church on the same site. The new building was a timber-framed long church that had a nave which measured 10 by 7.5 metres (33 ft × 25 ft) plus a choir that measured 5.5 by 4.5 metres (18 ft × 15 ft). It also had a 2-by-7.5-metre (6 ft 7 in × 24 ft 7 in) church porch on the west end of the building.

In 1870, the church underwent major renovations and an expansion. This project included lengthening the nave and rebuilding the roof higher than the previous roof. A new tower was also constructed on the new roof. John Alver was the lead builder for this project. The 1686 church originally had interior paneling that was covered with painted rosemåling. This paneling was not kept in the 1870 renovations. The church was consecrated again on 25 September 1870 after an extensive expansion. The church was almost completely rebuilt, so some sources state 1870 as the church's date of construction since even though some parts of the church are much older.

In 1910, a wood stove was installed to provide heat in the church. In 1924, a sacristy was constructed alongside the chancel. In 1955, electric lighting was installed in the church. In 1970, the old wood stove was removed and electric heating was installed in the church.

== Media gallery ==
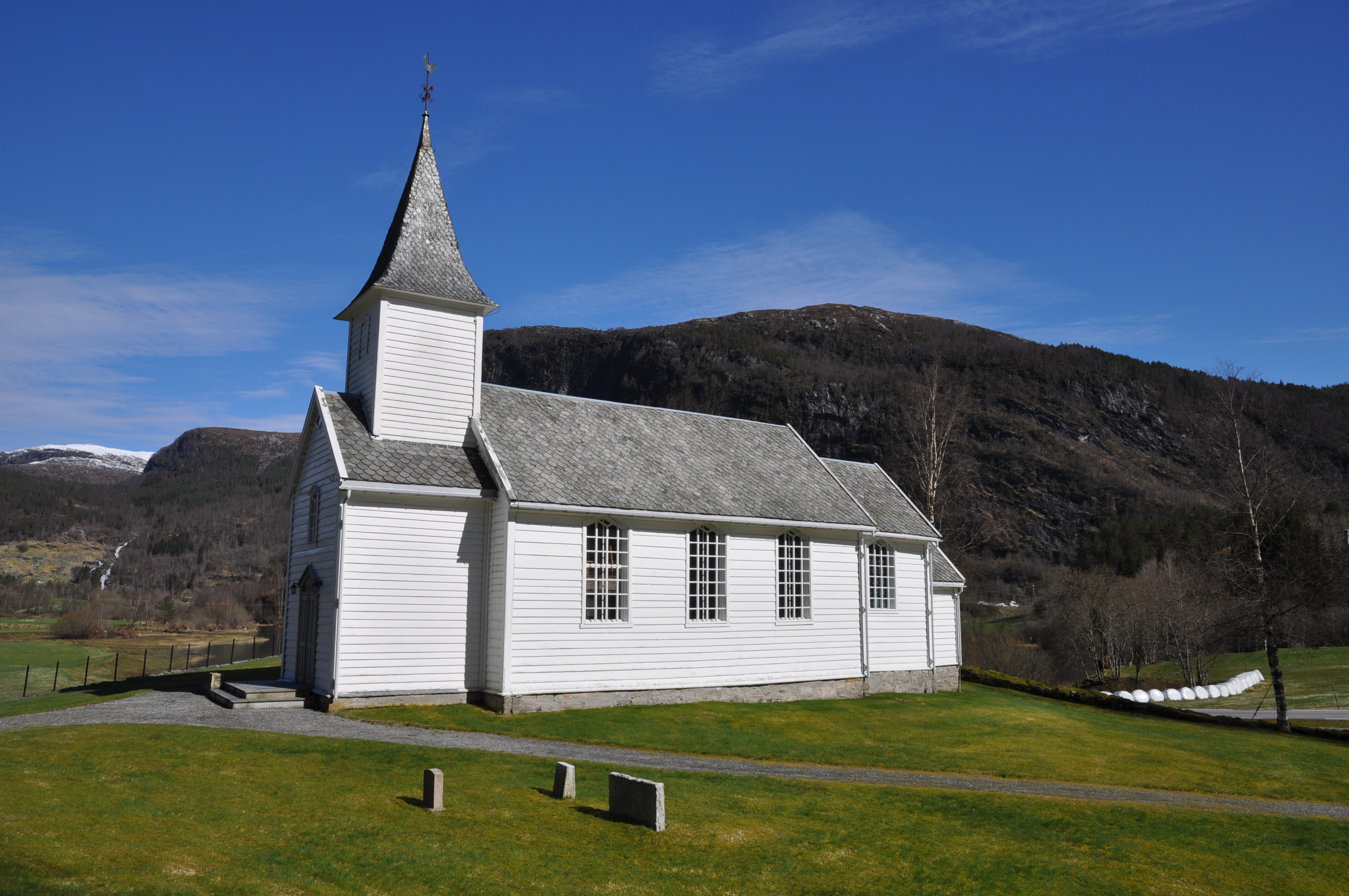

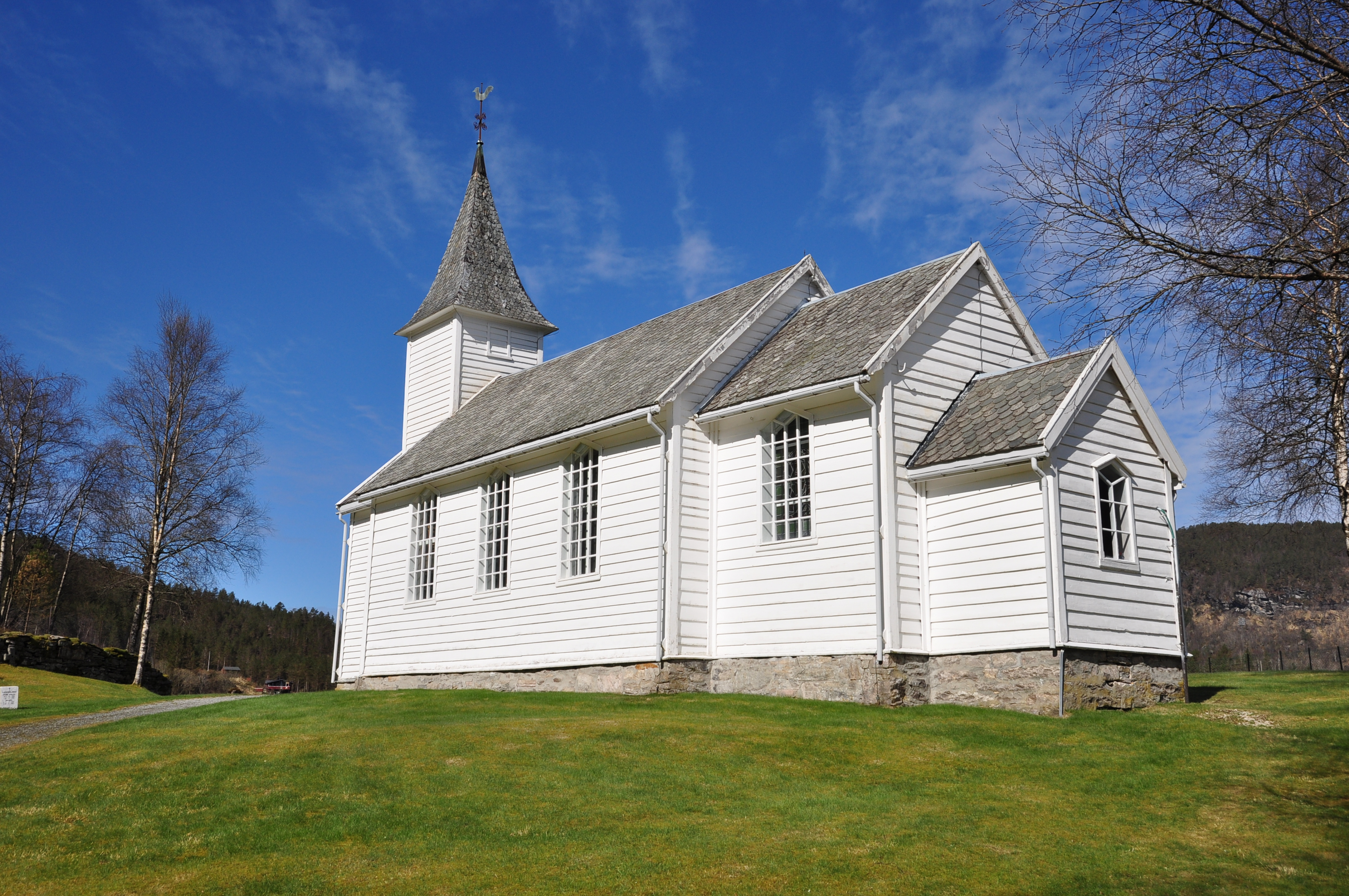

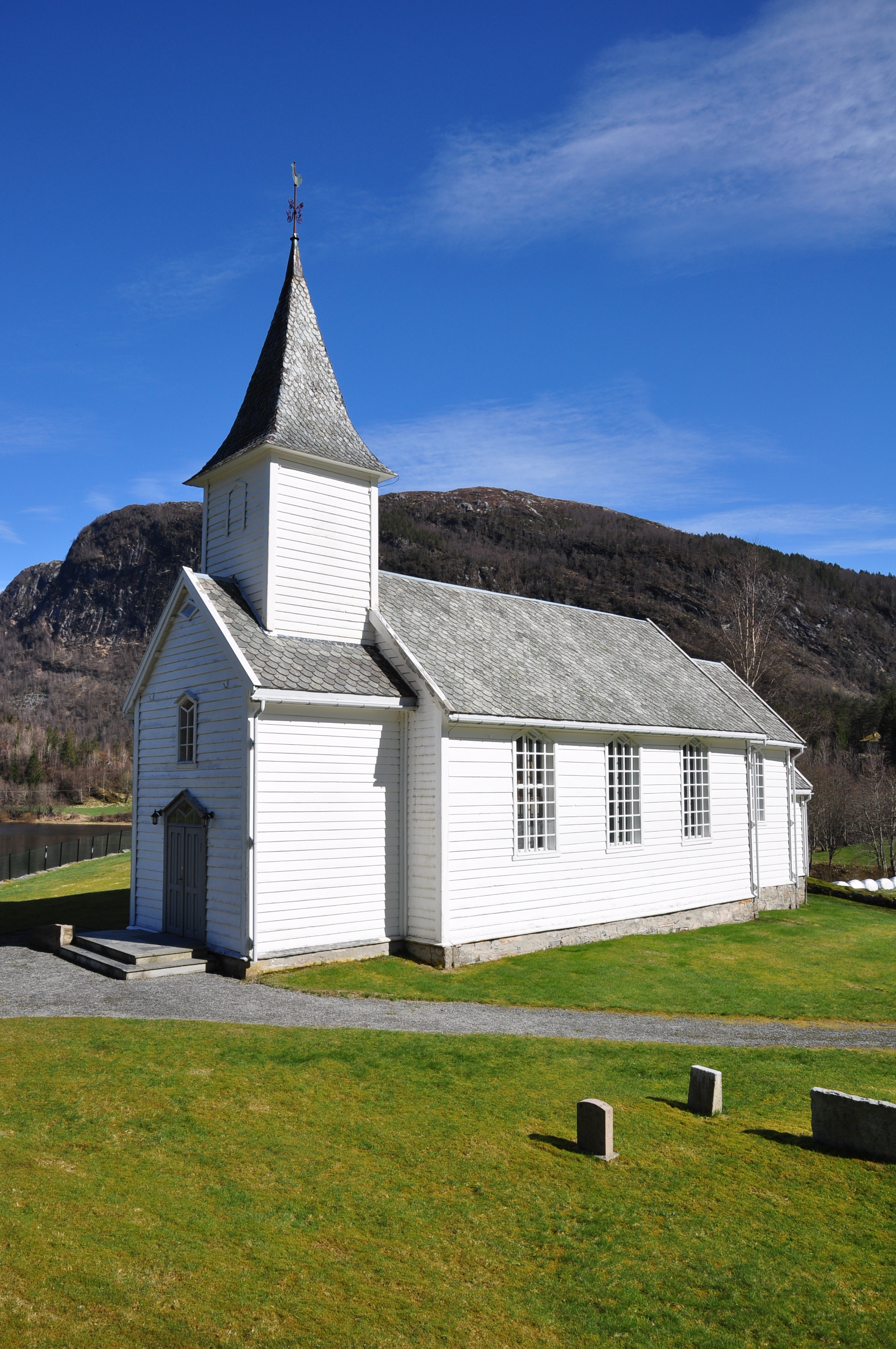

== See also ==
- List of churches in Bjørgvin
