= Fjaler Municipality =

Municipality in Vestland, Norway

Fjaler Municipality Fjaler kommune
- Municipality
- Ytre Holmedal herred (historic name)
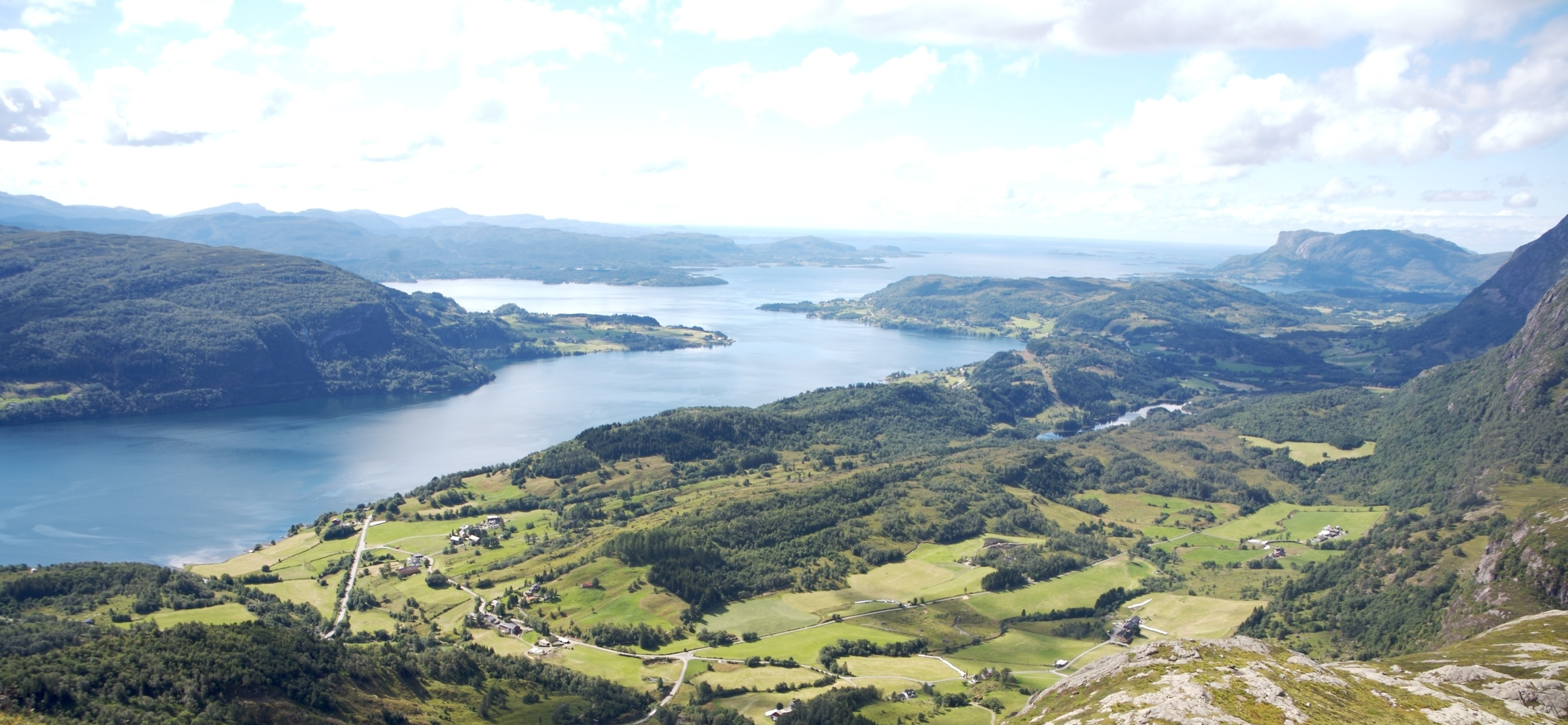
- View of Fjaler to the left of the fjord

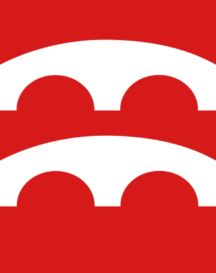
- Flag Coat of arms

- Vestland within Norway

- Fjaler within Vestland
- Coordinates: 61°18′22″N 05°27′48″E
- Country: Norway
- County: Vestland
- District: Sunnfjord
- Established: 1 Jan 1838
  - Created as: Formannskapsdistrikt
- Administrative centre: Dale i Sunnfjord

Government
  - Mayor (2023): Leif Jarle Espedal (Ap)

Area
  - Total: 416.59 km^{2} (160.85 sq mi)
  - Land: 390.09 km^{2} (150.61 sq mi)
  - Water: 26.50 km^{2} (10.23 sq mi) 6.4%
  - Rank: #233 in Norway
- Highest elevation: 812.11 m (2,664.4 ft)

Population (2025)
  - Total: 2,924
  - Rank: #233 in Norway
  - Density: 7/km^{2} (18/sq mi)
  - Change (10 years): ▲ +0.6%
- Demonym(s): Dalsfjording; Fjalerbu

Official language
  - Norwegian form: Nynorsk
- Time zone: UTC+01:00 (CET)
  - Summer (DST): UTC+02:00 (CEST)
- ISO 3166 code: NO-4646
- Website: Official website

Fjaler is a municipality in the county of Vestland, Norway. It is located in the traditional district of Sunnfjord. The administrative centre is the village of Dale. Other places in Fjaler include Espedal, Flekke, Folkestad, Guddal, and Hellevika.

The 416.59-square-kilometre (160.85 sq mi) municipality is the 233rd largest by area out of the 357 municipalities in Norway. Fjaler Municipality is the 233rd most populous municipality in Norway with a population of 2,924. The municipality's population density is 7 inhabitants per square kilometre (18/sq mi) and its population has increased by 0.6% over the previous 10-year period.

Fjaler was the birthplace of famous Norwegian poet Jakob Sande. The UWC Red Cross Nordic at Haugland, one of the eighteen United World Colleges of the world is also located here, as well as the Nordic Art Centre at Dalsåsen. The Dalsfjord Bridge crosses the Dalsfjorden connecting Dale to Eikenes in the neighboring Askvoll Municipality. Buses depart from Dale to Førde, Rysjedalsvika, Hyllestad, and the western part of the municipality. Førde Airport, Bringeland is located about 28 kilometres (17 mi) to the east, with flights to Oslo and Bergen.

== General information ==
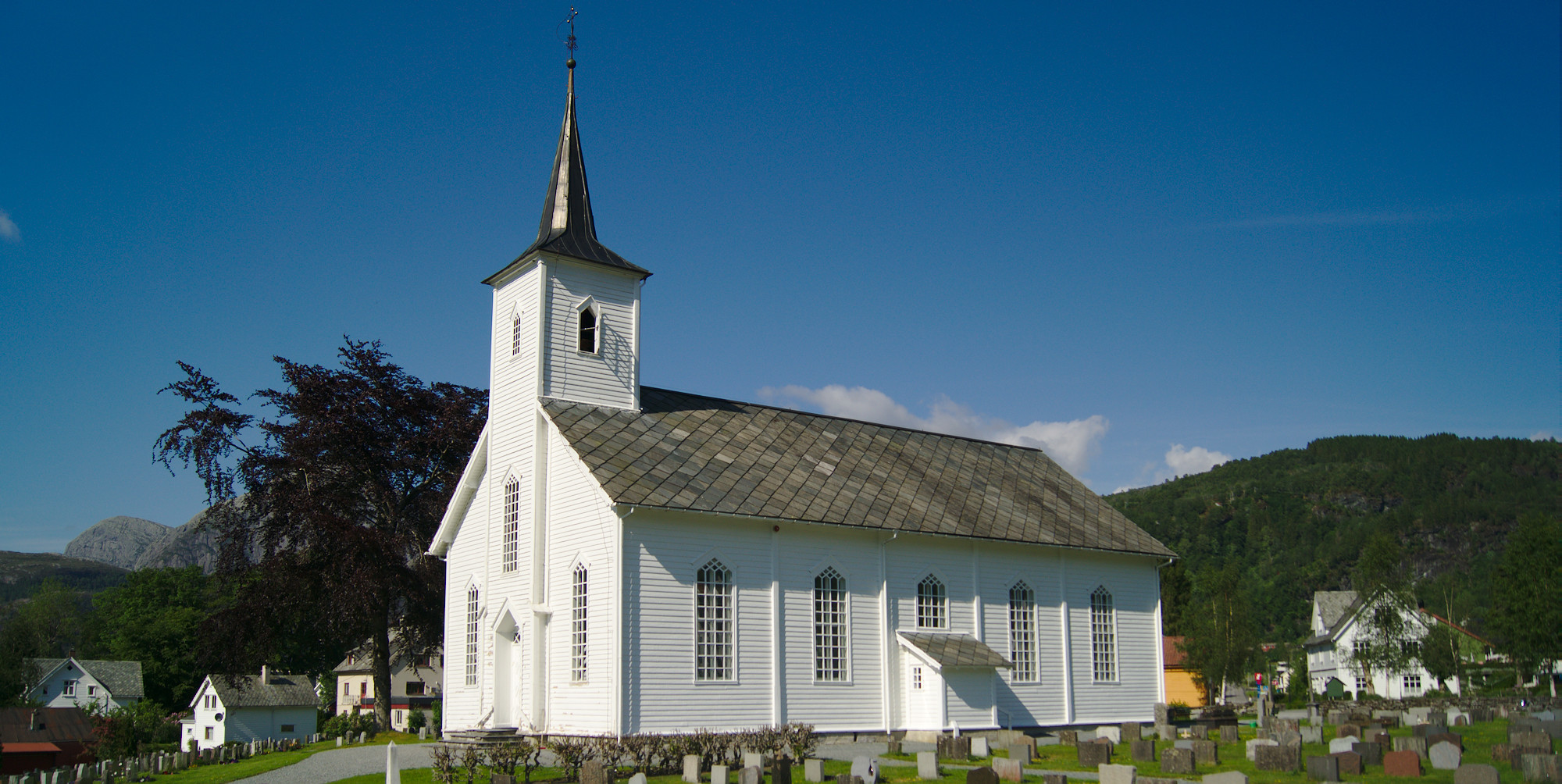
Dale Church

Ytre Holmedal was established as a municipality on 1 January 1838 (see formannskapsdistrikt law). The original municipality was identical to the Ytre Holmedal parish (prestegjeld) with the sub-parishes (sokn) of Holmedal, Dale, and Fjaler. In 1912, the name Ytre Holmedal Municipality was changed to Fjaler Municipality.

On 1 January 1990, some changes were made to the boundaries between Fjaler Municipality, Gaular Municipality, and Askvoll Municipality as follows:

- the areas surrounding the villages of Fure, Folkestad, and Våge (population: 482) in Askvoll Municipality were transferred to Fjaler Municipality
- he areas surrounding the villages of Vårdal, Holmedal, Rivedal, and a part of Hestad (population: 731) in Fjaler Municipality were transferred to Askvoll Municipality
- the parts of Hestad that did not go to Askvoll Municipality (population: 90) were transferred to Gaular Municipality

Historically, this municipality was part of the old Sogn og Fjordane county. On 1 January 2020, the municipality became a part of the newly-formed Vestland county (after Hordaland and Sogn og Fjordane counties were merged).

=== Name ===
The municipality (originally the parish) was named Ytre Holmedal, after the old Holmedal farm (Old Norse: Hǫlmudalr) since the first Holmedal Church was built there. The meaning of the first element of Holmedal is uncertain, but it may have been an old name for a local river, Holma. It is unknown what the river name meant. The last element is dalr which means "valley" or "dale". The prefix ytre (which means "outer") was added to distinguish the area from its neighbor, Indre Holmedal.

On 6 December 1912, a royal resolution changed the spelling of the name of the municipality to Fjaler. This new name brought back a very old name for the area (Old Norse: Fjalir). The name was the ancient name for the fjord (now called the Dalsfjorden). The name comes from the plural form of the word fjǫl which means "board" or "table". Older forms of the name were Fjalir or Fjalar.

=== Coat of arms ===
The coat of arms was granted on 8 February 1991. The official blazon is "Gules, two arched bridges argent" (Norwegian: På raud grunn to sølv kvelvingsbruer). This means the arms have a red field (background) and the charge is two arched stone bridges. The charge has a tincture of argent which means it is commonly colored white, but if it is made out of metal, then silver is used. The two bridges symbolize the old, historic bridges in the municipality that are part of the old post road that goes through Fjaler on its way to Trondheim. The arms were designed by Inge Rotevatn from Nordfjord. The municipal flag has the same design as the coat of arms.

=== Churches ===
The Church of Norway has one parish (sokn) within Fjaler Municipality. It is part of the Sunnfjord prosti (deanery) in the Diocese of Bjørgvin.

Churches in Fjaler Municipality
Parish (sokn)	Church name	Location of the church	Year built
Fjaler	Dale Church	Dale	1864
Fjaler	Folkestad Chapel	Våge	1913
Fjaler	Guddal Church	Guddal	1870
Fjaler	Hellevik Chapel	Hellevika	1978

== Geography ==
Fjaler Municipality lies to the south of the Dalsfjord in the Sunnfjord region. Askvoll Municipality lies to the north (across the fjord), Sunnfjord Municipality lies to the northeast, Høyanger Municipality lies to the southeast, and both Hyllestad Municipality and Solund Municipality lie to the southwest. The highest point in the municipality is the 812.11-metre (2,664.4 ft) tall mountain Skredfjellet, located along the border with Sunnfjord Municipality.

== Climate ==
Fjaler's climate is heavily moderated by its proximity to the Atlantic Ocean. It has a wet oceanic climate (Cfb according to the Köppen classification) as a result of this moderating effect. There is also a relatively large climate gradient within the municipality. The western parts such as Fureneset do have an average yearly precipitation of around 2300 mm per year, but have slightly milder winters and more wind than the more inland parts such as Hovland, where the average yearly precipitation is around 3500 mm. This is roughly 1000-1500 mm per year more than Bergen and Førde and makes it one of the wettest places in Norway. The station in Hovlandsdalen is the second wettest meteorological station run by the Norwegian Meteorological institute, only beaten by the station placed in Brekke i Sogn. This large amount of precipitation is a result of the frequent westerly winds coupled with orographic lift caused by the mountains. The highest mountains have a tundra climate and can have snow fall in all months except the summer.

The winter is usually the wettest season, with low-pressure areas frequently influencing the region. The late spring and early summer are the driest and sunniest time of the year, but also here it can sometimes rain several days in a row. The rain is however less intense during this time, but can give floods are a result of rain-on-snow events. The wind can also suddenly change 180° along the Dasfjord. There is usually an easterly wind here as a result of pressure-driven channeling, this usually gets strong when a low-pressure area gets closer, after which it will suddenly change direction to southerly or westerly as the geostrophic wind gets too strong.

Climate data for Fureneset 1991–2020 (7 m), sunshine 2018-2025
Month	Jan	Feb	Mar	Apr	May	Jun	Jul	Aug	Sep	Oct	Nov	Dec	Year
Daily mean °C (°F)	2.4 (36.3)	2.0 (35.6)	3.2 (37.8)	6.2 (43.2)	9.4 (48.9)	12.4 (54.3)	14.6 (58.3)	14.6 (58.3)	12.1 (53.8)	8.2 (46.8)	5.0 (41.0)	2.8 (37.0)	7.7 (45.9)
Average precipitation mm (inches)	250 (9.8)	211 (8.3)	185 (7.3)	132 (5.2)	103 (4.1)	105 (4.1)	137 (5.4)	175 (6.9)	222 (8.7)	249 (9.8)	252 (9.9)	279 (11.0)	2,300 (90.5)
Mean monthly sunshine hours	14.0	58.9	118.5	217.5	231.5	210.6	201.1	151.5	109.5	70.8	40.6	5.9	1,430.4
Source 1: Yr.no
Source 2: Se klima

Climate data for Hovlandsdal 1991–2020 (85 m)
Month	Jan	Feb	Mar	Apr	May	Jun	Jul	Aug	Sep	Oct	Nov	Dec	Year
Average precipitation mm (inches)	374.7 (14.75)	313.1 (12.33)	289.6 (11.40)	186.8 (7.35)	172.4 (6.79)	186.1 (7.33)	198.2 (7.80)	239.4 (9.43)	348.1 (13.70)	355.7 (14.00)	367.7 (14.48)	395.0 (15.55)	3,426.8 (134.91)
Average precipitation days (≥ 1.0 mm)	20	17	17	14	14	14	16	17	17	18	18	19	201
Source: NOAA WMO averages 91-2020 Norway

== Government ==
Fjaler Municipality is responsible for primary education (through 10th grade), outpatient health services, senior citizen services, welfare and other social services, zoning, economic development, and municipal roads and utilities. The municipality is governed by a municipal council of directly elected representatives. The mayor is indirectly elected by a vote of the municipal council. The municipality is under the jurisdiction of the Sogn og Fjordane District Court and the Gulating Court of Appeal.

=== Municipal council ===
The municipal council (Kommunestyre) of Fjaler Municipality is made up of 23 representatives that are elected to four year terms. The tables below show the current and historical composition of the council by political party.

Fjaler kommunestyre 2023–2027
Party name (in Nynorsk)	Number of representatives
Labour Party (Arbeidarpartiet)	5
Green Party (Miljøpartiet Dei Grøne)	2
Conservative Party (Høgre)	4
Centre Party (Senterpartiet)	6
Socialist Left Party (Sosialistisk Venstreparti)	2
Liberal Party (Venstre)	4
Total number of members:	23

Fjaler kommunestyre 2019–2023
Party name (in Nynorsk)	Number of representatives
Labour Party (Arbeidarpartiet)	4
Progress Party (Framstegspartiet)	1
Green Party (Miljøpartiet Dei Grøne)	2
Conservative Party (Høgre)	2
Centre Party (Senterpartiet)	7
Socialist Left Party (Sosialistisk Venstreparti)	2
Liberal Party (Venstre)	5
Total number of members:	23

Fjaler kommunestyre 2015–2019
Party name (in Nynorsk)	Number of representatives
Labour Party (Arbeidarpartiet)	7
Green Party (Miljøpartiet Dei Grøne)	1
Conservative Party (Høgre)	2
Christian Democratic Party (Kristeleg Folkeparti)	1
Centre Party (Senterpartiet)	8
Socialist Left Party (Sosialistisk Venstreparti)	1
Liberal Party (Venstre)	3
Total number of members:	23

Fjaler kommunestyre 2011–2015
Party name (in Nynorsk)	Number of representatives
Labour Party (Arbeidarpartiet)	11
Conservative Party (Høgre)	3
Christian Democratic Party (Kristeleg Folkeparti)	1
Centre Party (Senterpartiet)	4
Socialist Left Party (Sosialistisk Venstreparti)	1
Liberal Party (Venstre)	3
Total number of members:	23

Fjaler kommunestyre 2007–2011
Party name (in Nynorsk)	Number of representatives
Labour Party (Arbeidarpartiet)	11
Progress Party (Framstegspartiet)	2
Conservative Party (Høgre)	3
Christian Democratic Party (Kristeleg Folkeparti)	2
Centre Party (Senterpartiet)	3
Socialist Left Party (Sosialistisk Venstreparti)	1
Liberal Party (Venstre)	1
Total number of members:	23

Fjaler kommunestyre 2003–2007
Party name (in Nynorsk)	Number of representatives
Labour Party (Arbeidarpartiet)	6
Conservative Party (Høgre)	4
Christian Democratic Party (Kristeleg Folkeparti)	1
Centre Party (Senterpartiet)	5
Socialist Left Party (Sosialistisk Venstreparti)	3
Liberal Party (Venstre)	4
Total number of members:	23

Fjaler kommunestyre 1999–2003
Party name (in Nynorsk)	Number of representatives
Labour Party (Arbeidarpartiet)	7
Conservative Party (Høgre)	5
Christian Democratic Party (Kristeleg Folkeparti)	2
Centre Party (Senterpartiet)	6
Socialist Left Party (Sosialistisk Venstreparti)	1
Liberal Party (Venstre)	2
Total number of members:	23

Fjaler kommunestyre 1995–1999
Party name (in Nynorsk)	Number of representatives
Labour Party (Arbeidarpartiet)	7
Conservative Party (Høgre)	4
Christian Democratic Party (Kristeleg Folkeparti)	1
Centre Party (Senterpartiet)	7
Socialist Left Party (Sosialistisk Venstreparti)	2
Liberal Party (Venstre)	2
Total number of members:	23

Fjaler kommunestyre 1991–1995
Party name (in Nynorsk)	Number of representatives
Labour Party (Arbeidarpartiet)	8
Conservative Party (Høgre)	3
Christian Democratic Party (Kristeleg Folkeparti)	2
Centre Party (Senterpartiet)	11
Socialist Left Party (Sosialistisk Venstreparti)	3
Liberal Party (Venstre)	2
Total number of members:	29

Fjaler kommunestyre 1987–1991
Party name (in Nynorsk)	Number of representatives
Labour Party (Arbeidarpartiet)	10
Conservative Party (Høgre)	5
Christian Democratic Party (Kristeleg Folkeparti)	2
Centre Party (Senterpartiet)	7
Socialist Left Party (Sosialistisk Venstreparti)	3
Liberal Party (Venstre)	2
Total number of members:	29

Fjaler kommunestyre 1983–1987
Party name (in Nynorsk)	Number of representatives
Labour Party (Arbeidarpartiet)	12
Conservative Party (Høgre)	4
Christian Democratic Party (Kristeleg Folkeparti)	3
Centre Party (Senterpartiet)	7
Socialist Left Party (Sosialistisk Venstreparti)	1
Liberal Party (Venstre)	2
Total number of members:	29

Fjaler kommunestyre 1979–1983
Party name (in Nynorsk)	Number of representatives
Labour Party (Arbeidarpartiet)	9
Conservative Party (Høgre)	4
Christian Democratic Party (Kristeleg Folkeparti)	3
Centre Party (Senterpartiet)	9
Socialist Left Party (Sosialistisk Venstreparti)	1
Liberal Party (Venstre)	1
Local list for the school district Rivedal-Holmedal-Vårdal (Bygdeliste for skulekrinsane Rivedal-Holmedal-Vårdal)	2
Total number of members:	29

Fjaler kommunestyre 1975–1979
Party name (in Nynorsk)	Number of representatives
Labour Party (Arbeidarpartiet)	10
Conservative Party (Høgre)	2
Christian Democratic Party (Kristeleg Folkeparti)	4
New People's Party (Nye Folkepartiet)	1
Centre Party (Senterpartiet)	10
Socialist Left Party (Sosialistisk Venstreparti)	1
Liberal Party (Venstre)	1
Total number of members:	29

Fjaler kommunestyre 1971–1975
Party name (in Nynorsk)	Number of representatives
Labour Party (Arbeidarpartiet)	10
Christian Democratic Party (Kristeleg Folkeparti)	3
Centre Party (Senterpartiet)	9
Socialist People's Party (Sosialistisk Folkeparti)	1
Liberal Party (Venstre)	4
Joint List(s) of Non-Socialist Parties (Borgarlege Felleslister)	2
Total number of members:	29

Fjaler kommunestyre 1967–1971
Party name (in Nynorsk)	Number of representatives
Labour Party (Arbeidarpartiet)	11
Christian Democratic Party (Kristeleg Folkeparti)	3
Centre Party (Senterpartiet)	9
Socialist People's Party (Sosialistisk Folkeparti)	1
Liberal Party (Venstre)	5
Total number of members:	29

Fjaler kommunestyre 1963–1967
Party name (in Nynorsk)	Number of representatives
Labour Party (Arbeidarpartiet)	10
Christian Democratic Party (Kristeleg Folkeparti)	3
Centre Party (Senterpartiet)	9
Liberal Party (Venstre)	7
Total number of members:	29

Fjaler heradsstyre 1959–1963
Party name (in Nynorsk)	Number of representatives
Labour Party (Arbeidarpartiet)	9
Centre Party (Senterpartiet)	10
Liberal Party (Venstre)	7
Local List(s) (Lokale lister)	3
Total number of members:	29

Fjaler heradsstyre 1955–1959
Party name (in Nynorsk)	Number of representatives
Labour Party (Arbeidarpartiet)	10
Farmers' Party (Bondepartiet)	6
Liberal Party (Venstre)	6
Local List(s) (Lokale lister)	7
Total number of members:	29

Fjaler heradsstyre 1951–1955
Party name (in Nynorsk)	Number of representatives
Labour Party (Arbeidarpartiet)	11
Farmers' Party (Bondepartiet)	8
Liberal Party (Venstre)	8
Local List(s) (Lokale lister)	9
Total number of members:	36

Fjaler heradsstyre 1947–1951
Party name (in Nynorsk)	Number of representatives
Labour Party (Arbeidarpartiet)	12
Farmers' Party (Bondepartiet)	3
Liberal Party (Venstre)	6
Joint List(s) of Non-Socialist Parties (Borgarlege Felleslister)	8
Local List(s) (Lokale lister)	7
Total number of members:	36

Fjaler heradsstyre 1945–1947
Party name (in Nynorsk)	Number of representatives
Labour Party (Arbeidarpartiet)	11
Joint List(s) of Non-Socialist Parties (Borgarlege Felleslister)	11
Local List(s) (Lokale lister)	14
Total number of members:	36

Fjaler heradsstyre 1937–1941*
Party name (in Nynorsk)	Number of representatives
Labour Party (Arbeidarpartiet)	9
Farmers' Party (Bondepartiet)	3
Liberal Party (Venstre)	6
Joint List(s) of Non-Socialist Parties (Borgarlege Felleslister)	9
Local List(s) (Lokale lister)	9
Total number of members:	36
Note: Due to the German occupation of Norway during World War II, no elections were held for new municipal councils until after the war ended in 1945.

=== Mayors ===
The mayor (Nynorsk: ordførar) of Fjaler Municipality is the political leader of the municipality and the chairperson of the municipal council. Here is a list of people who have held this position:

- 1838–1847: Johan Widing Heiberg Landmark
- 1848–1855: Peder J. Fossedal
- 1855–1859: Rev. Peter Lorentz de Ferry Smith
- 1860–1863: Ola Mathiasson Bakke
- 1864–1867: Peder C. Mork
- 1868–1868: J. Vonen
- 1869–1871: J. Kalstad
- 1872–1875: Mons Davidson Huustvedt
- 1876–1879: Ola Mathiasson Bakke
- 1880–1891: L. Larsen
- 1892–1895: Mons Davidson Huustvedt
- 1896–1898: David Olsen Bakke
- 1899–1904: Ole A. Skarstein
- 1904–1910: David Olsen Bakke
- 1911–1913: Øystein Sørebø
- 1914–1916: Andreas Sande
- 1917–1919: Ola J. Espedal
- 1920–1928: Andreas Sande
- 1929–1934: Knut Bakkelid
- 1935–1940: Ragnvald Fagerheim
- 1941–1942: Søren K. Hauge
- 1945–1945: David M. Hustveit
- 1945–1947: Ragnvald Fagerheim
- 1948–1959: Søren K. Hauge
- 1960–1961: Jonas Mork
- 1961–1963: Aksel Hovland (V)
- 1964–1965: Gustav Stavøstrand (V)
- 1966–1967: Ola Sørebø (V)
- 1968–1971: Andreas Sande (Sp)
- 1972–1975: Arne Barnsnes (Ap)
- 1976–1981: Trygve Bjånes (Ap)
- 1982–1987: Kåre Kleppe (Sp)
- 1988–1989: Magnar Vagstad (Ap)
- 1990–1995: Rasmus Felde (Sp)
- 1995–2002: Arne Kyrkjebø (Ap)
- 2002–2003: Jan Ulltang (Sp)
- 2003–2015: Arve Helle (Ap)
- 2015–2019: Gunhild Berge Stang (V)
- 2019–2023: Kjetil Høgseth Felde (Sp)
- 2023–present: Leif Jarle Espedal (Ap)

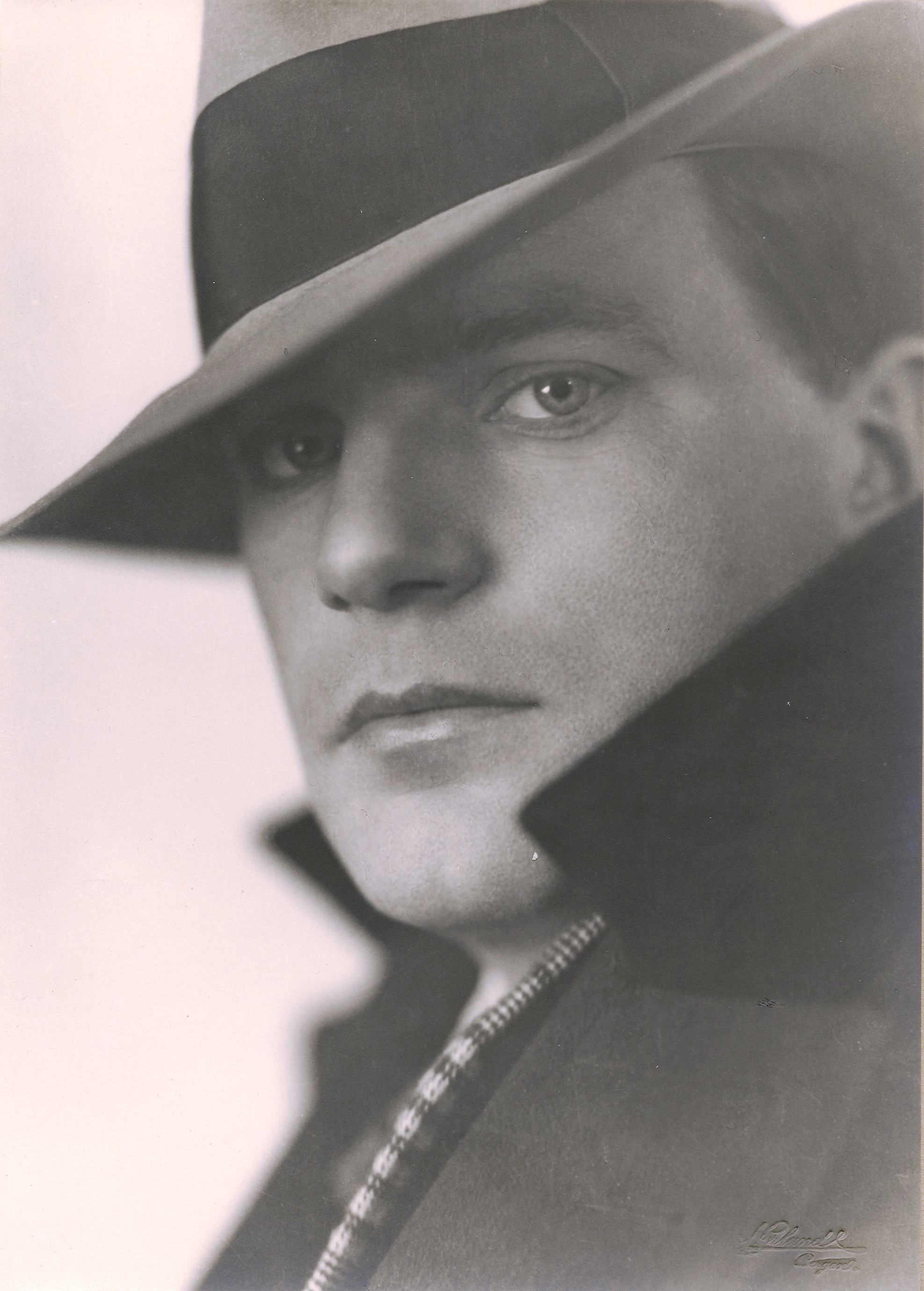
Jakob Sande, 1929

== Notable people ==
- Nikka Vonen (1836 in Dale – 1933), an educator, folklorist, and author
- Haldis Halvorsen (1889 in Dale – 1936), a mezzo-soprano opera singer
- Erik Grant Lea (1892–1979), a mythical tycoon and Norwegian ship-owner, banker, insurer, and mill owner who settled in Gjølanger in Fjaler in 1922
- Jakob Sande (1906 in Dale – 1967), a writer, poet, and folk singer who wrote in Nynorsk
- Herbjørn Sørebø (1933 in Fjaler – 2003), a journalist and broadcasting personality

== Gallery ==
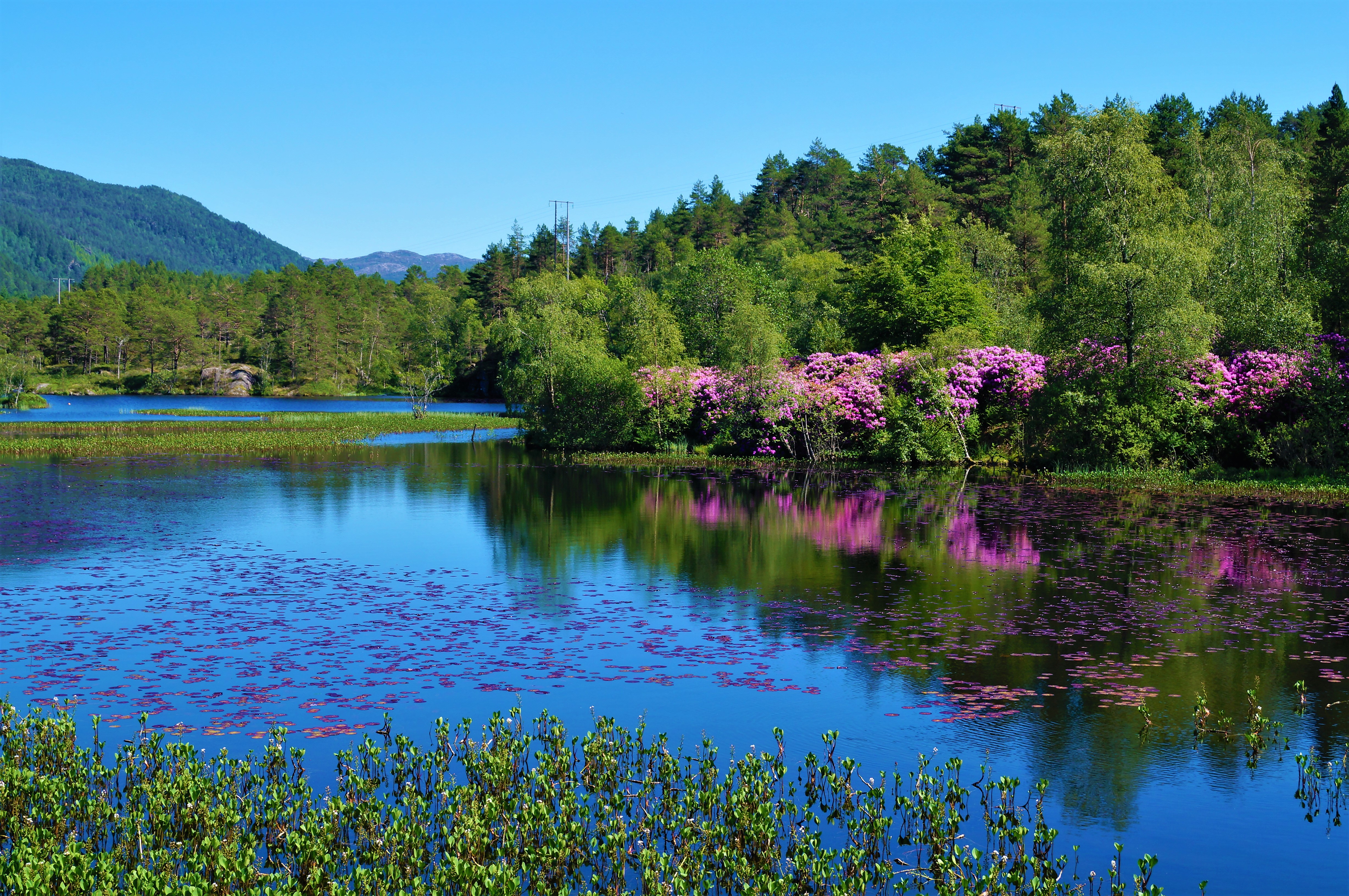
Gjølanger

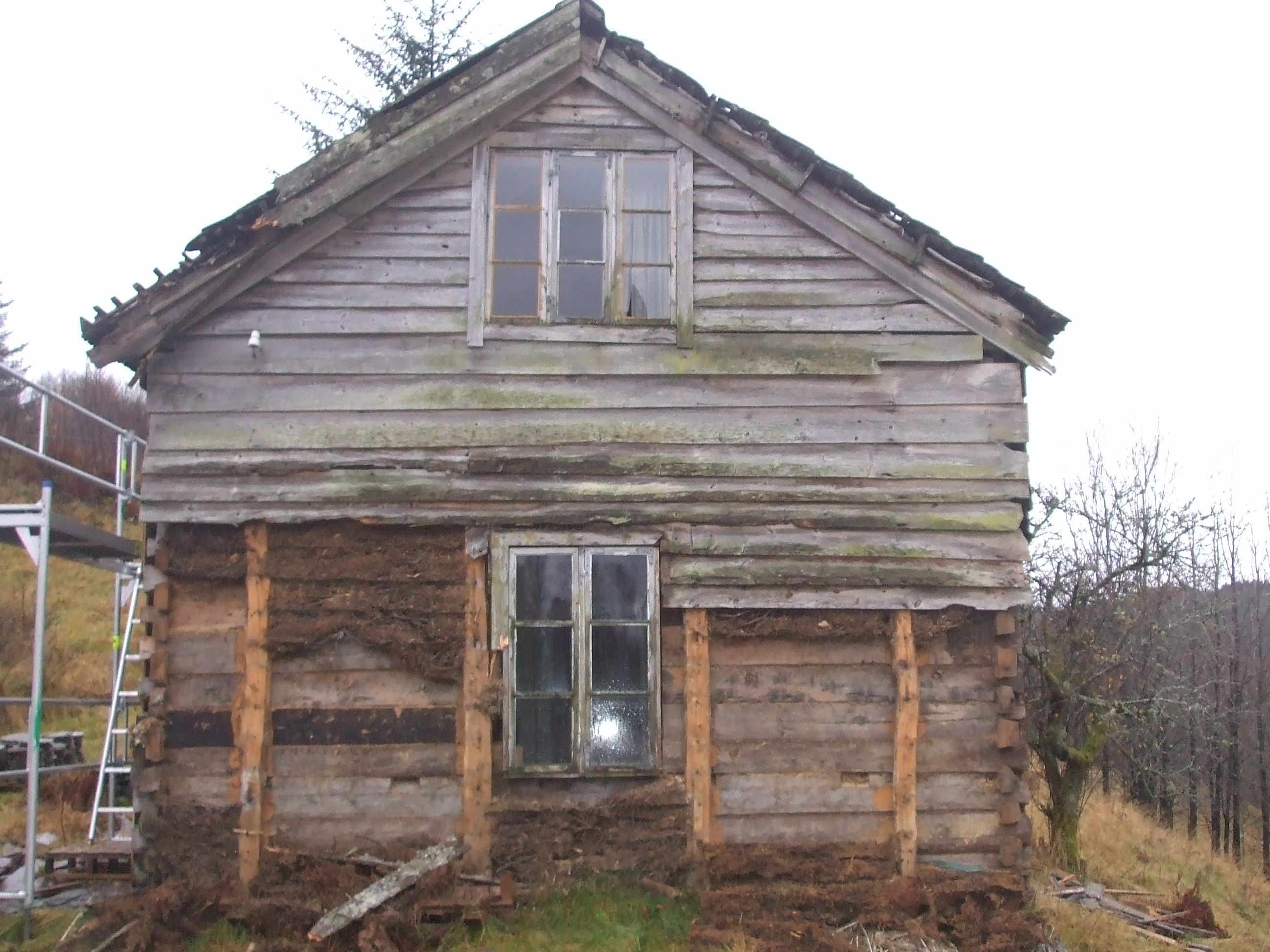
A building at Larsbakk in Fjaler

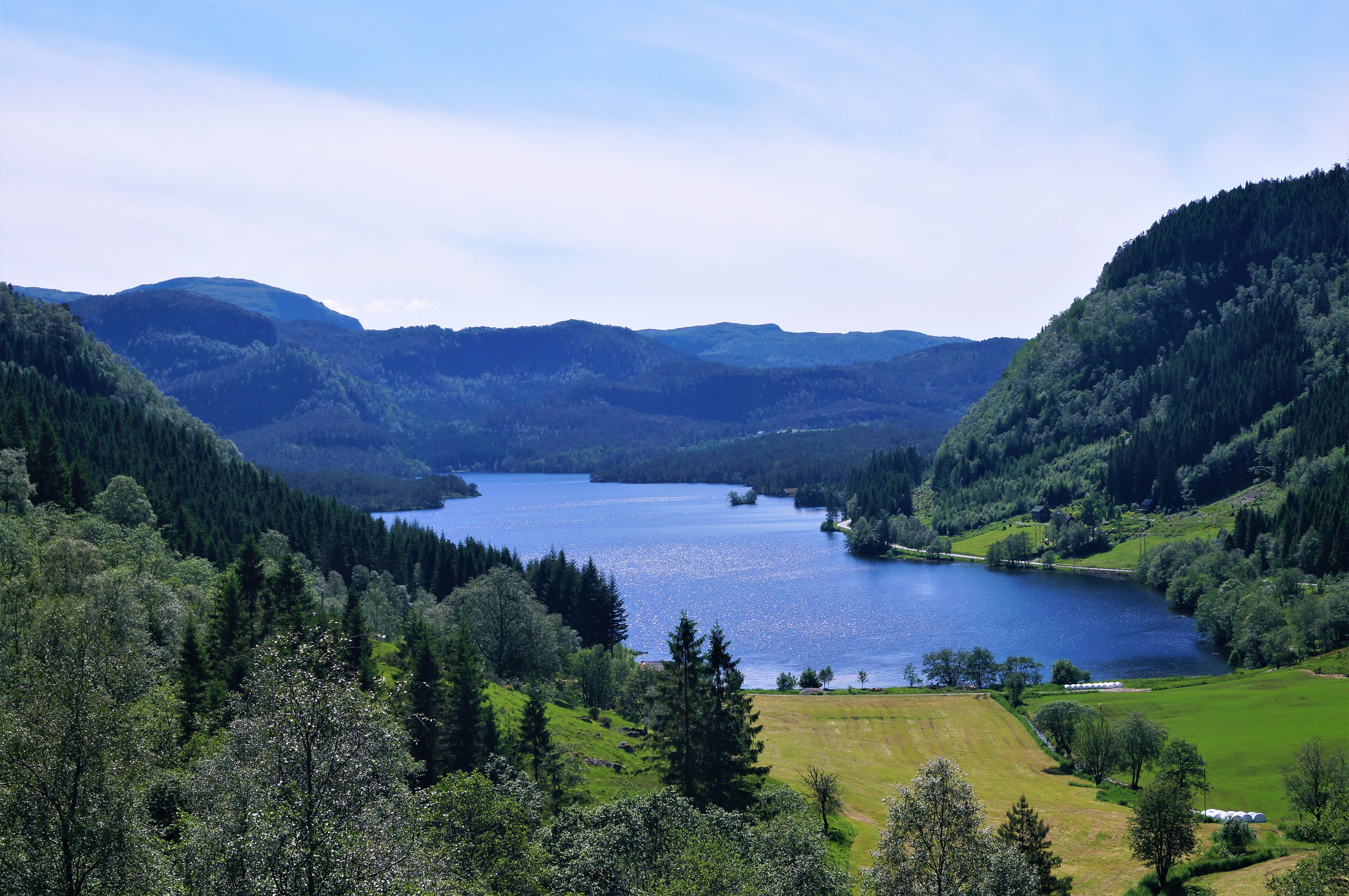
Tyssedalsvatnet lake in Fjaler

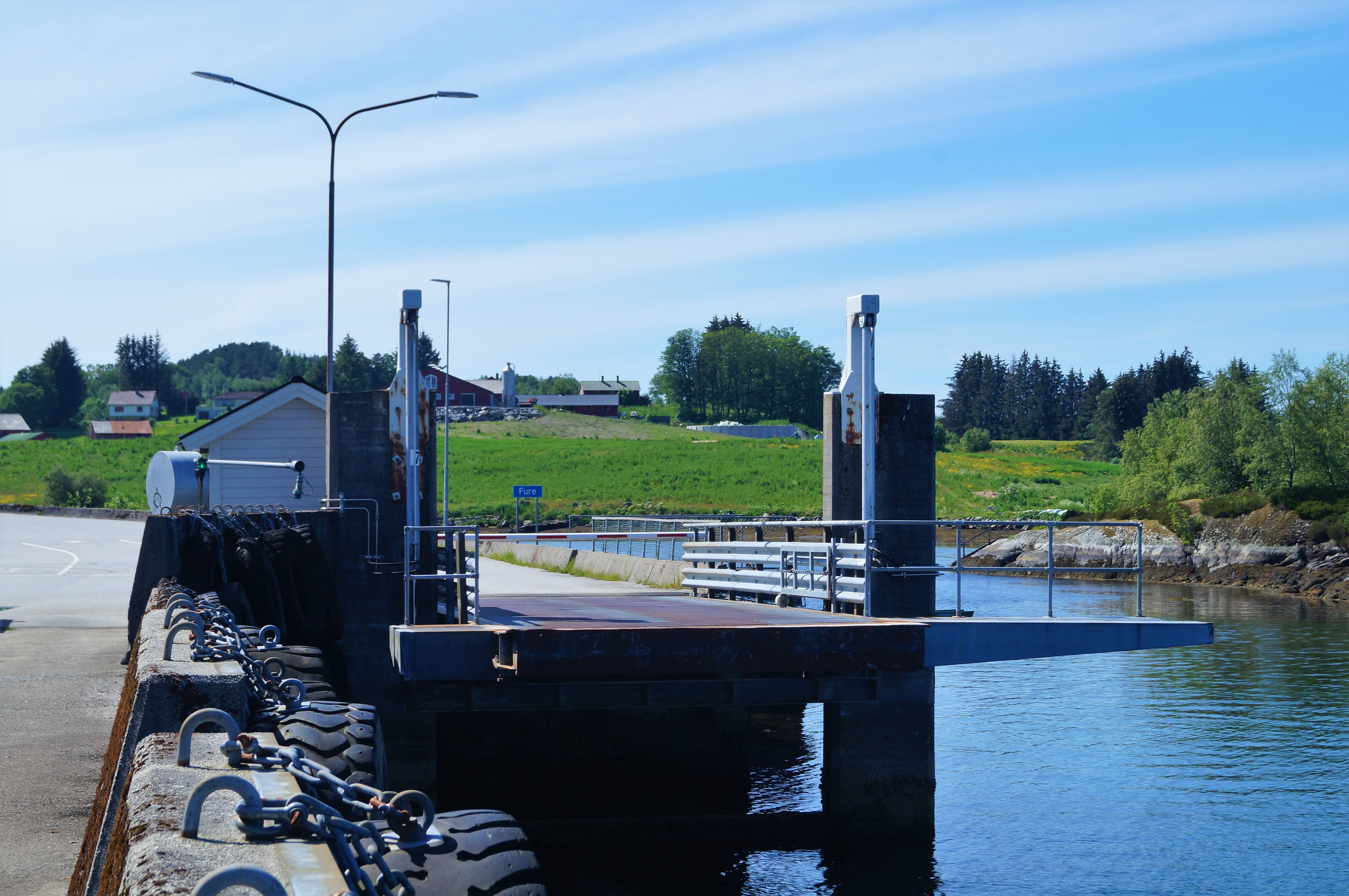
Fure ferry quay
