= Folkestad Chapel =

Church in Vestland, Norway

- Folkestad bedehuskapell
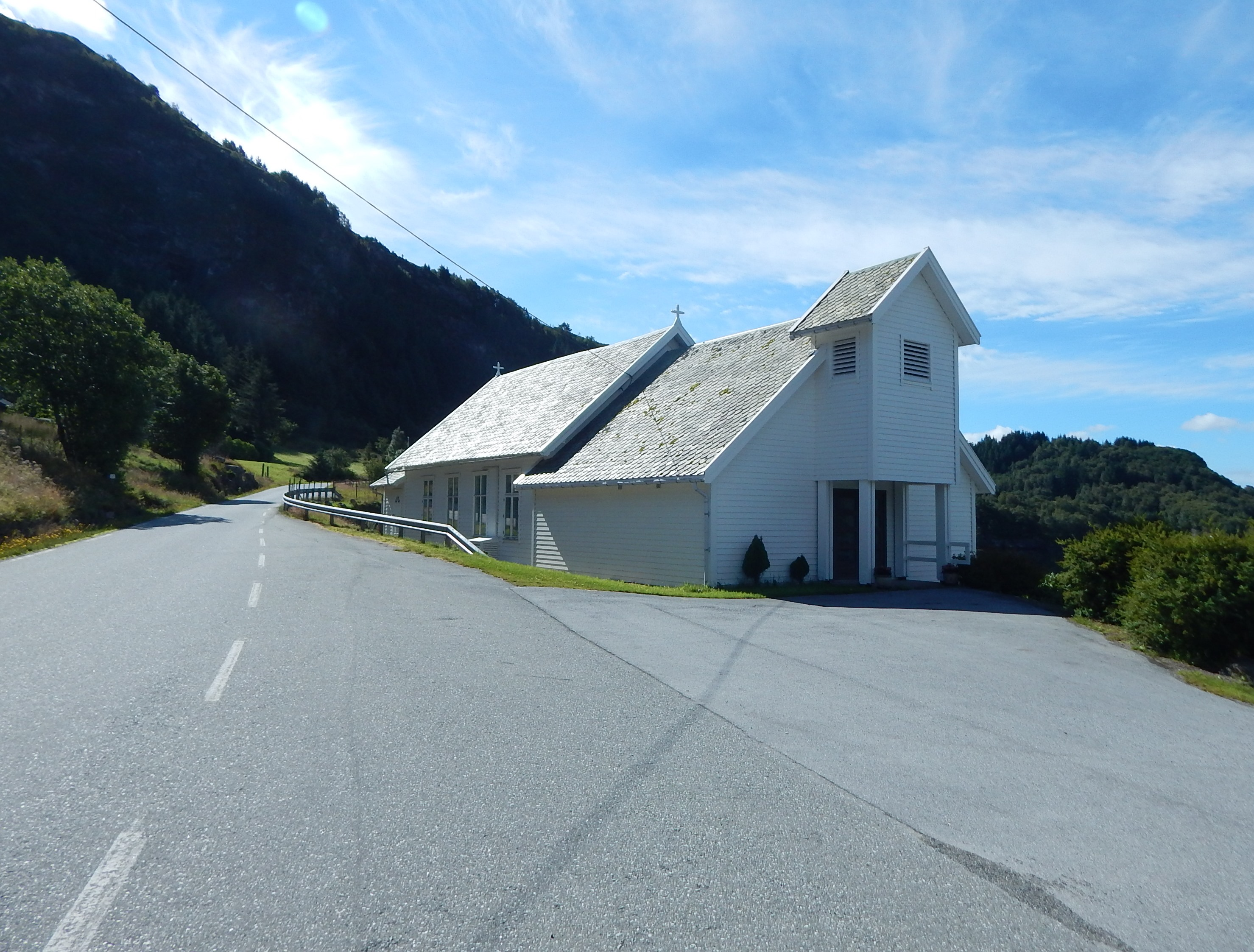
- View of the chapel
- Folkestad Chapel
- 61.2703°N 5.0286°E
- Location: Fjaler Municipality, Vestland
- Country: Norway
- Denomination: Church of Norway
- Churchmanship: Evangelical Lutheran

History
- Status: Chapel
- Founded: 1913
- Consecrated: 4 September 1940

Architecture
- Functional status: Active
- Architect: Gerhard Folkestad
- Architectural type: Long church
- Completed: 1913 (113 years ago)

Specifications
- Capacity: 200
- Materials: Wood

Administration
- Diocese: Bjørgvin bispedømme
- Deanery: Sunnfjord prosti
- Parish: Fjaler
- Norwegian Cultural Heritage Site
- Type: Church
- Status: Not protected
- ID: 84176

Folkestad Chapel (Norwegian: Folkestad bedehuskapell) is a chapel of the Church of Norway in Fjaler Municipality in Vestland county, Norway. It is located in the village of Våge in extreme western Fjaler. It is an annex chapel in the Fjaler parish which is part of the Sunnfjord prosti (deanery) in the Diocese of Bjørgvin. The white, wooden chapel was built in a long church design in 1913 by master builder Gerhard Folkestad. It was originally built as a prayer house (bedehus).

== History ==
The building was constructed in 1913 by the builder Gerhard Folkestad. It was originally used as a prayer house as it was not originally consecrated for church use. In 1940 the building was enlarged and redesigned into a full chapel. The old building was remodeled to be the nave and a new choir was built to give it a long church design. The new building was designed to seat about 200 people. It was consecrated for church use on 4 September 1940 by Bishop Andreas Fleischer. During World War II, the occupying German military occupied the building, but some people in the village were able to salvage some of the interior furniture and items and save them from damage before the Germans took over. After the war, much of the chapel needed to be restored before it could be used once again. In 1983, a large new church porch and tower were built as well as some other rooms. Prior to 1991, this chapel was part of Askvoll Municipality (and the Askvoll parish). After a municipal border change, the chapel is now part of Fjaler Municipality.

== See also ==
- List of churches in Bjørgvin
