= Dale, Fjaler =

Village in Fjaler Municipality, Norway

Dale Dale i Sunnfjord
- Village
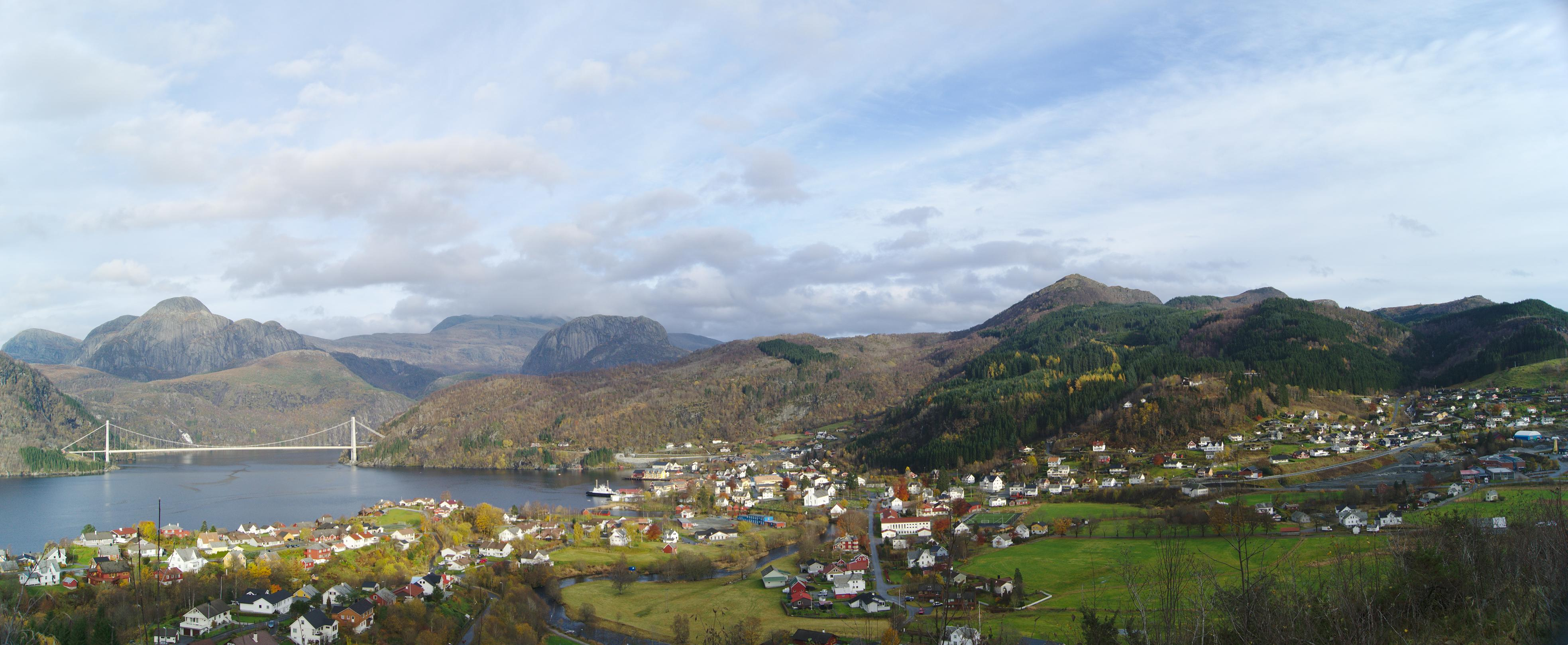
- Dale i Sunnfjord
- Interactive map of Dale
- Location within Vestland Location within Norway
- Coordinates: 61.36353°N 5.40037°E
- Country: Norway
- Region: Western Norway
- County: Vestland
- District: Sunnfjord
- Municipality: Fjaler Municipality

Area
  - Total: 1.19 km^{2} (0.46 sq mi)
- Elevation: 6 m (20 ft)

Population (2025)
  - Total: 1,284
  - Density: 1,089/km^{2} (2,820/sq mi)
- Time zone: UTC+01:00 (CET)
  - Summer (DST): UTC+02:00 (CEST)
- Post Code: 6963 Dale i Sunnfjord

Dale or Dale i Sunnfjord is the administrative centre of Fjaler Municipality in Vestland county, Norway. The village is located at the mouth of the river Vassdalselva on the southern shore of the Dalsfjorden in the northern part of Fjaler, about 6.5 kilometres (4.0 mi) northeast of the village of Flekke and about 20 kilometres (12 mi) west of the village of Bygstad (in neighboring Sunnfjord Municipality).

The 1.19-square-kilometre (290-acre) village has a population (2025) of 1,284 and a population density of 1,079 inhabitants per square kilometre (2,790/sq mi).

In December 2013, the new Dalsfjord Bridge, connecting Dale with Askvoll Municipality on the northern side of the fjord was opened and replaced the ferry route between Dale and Eikenes.

Also located in Dale is the Nordic Artists' Centre Dale, an artist-in-residence centre hosting international visual artists over periods of 2 or 3 months.

== Notable people ==
- Jakob Sande (1906–1967), a writer, poet, and folk singer.

== Climate ==
Fjaler's climate is heavily moderated by its proximity to the Atlantic Ocean. It has a wet oceanic climate (Cfb according to the Köppen classification) as a result of this moderating effect. There is also a relatively large climate gradient within the municipality. The western parts such as Fureneset do have an average yearly precipitation of around 2300 mm per year, but have slightly milder winters and more wind than the more inland parts such as Hovland, where the average yearly precipitation is around 3500 mm. This is roughly 1000-1500 mm per year more than Bergen and Førde and makes it one of the wettest places in Norway. The station in Hovlandsdalen is the second wettest meteorological station run by the Norwegian Meteorological institute, only beaten by the station placed in Brekke i Sogn. This large amount of precipitation is a result of the frequent westerly winds coupled with orographic lift caused by the mountains. The highest mountains have a tundra climate and can have snow fall in all months except the summer.

The winter is usually the wettest season, with low-pressure areas frequently influencing the region. The late spring and early summer are the driest and sunniest time of the year, but also here it can sometimes rain several days in a row. The rain is however less intense during this time, but can give floods are a result of rain-on-snow events. The wind can also suddenly change 180° along the Dasfjord. There is usually an easterly wind here as a result of pressure-driven channeling, this usually gets strong when a low-pressure area gets closer, after which it will suddenly change direction to southerly or westerly as the geostrophic wind gets too strong.

Climate data for Fureneset 1991–2020 (7 m), sunshine 2018-2025
Month	Jan	Feb	Mar	Apr	May	Jun	Jul	Aug	Sep	Oct	Nov	Dec	Year
Daily mean °C (°F)	2.4 (36.3)	2.0 (35.6)	3.2 (37.8)	6.2 (43.2)	9.4 (48.9)	12.4 (54.3)	14.6 (58.3)	14.6 (58.3)	12.1 (53.8)	8.2 (46.8)	5.0 (41.0)	2.8 (37.0)	7.7 (45.9)
Average precipitation mm (inches)	250 (9.8)	211 (8.3)	185 (7.3)	132 (5.2)	103 (4.1)	105 (4.1)	137 (5.4)	175 (6.9)	222 (8.7)	249 (9.8)	252 (9.9)	279 (11.0)	2,300 (90.5)
Mean monthly sunshine hours	14.0	58.9	118.5	217.5	231.5	210.6	201.1	151.5	109.5	70.8	40.6	5.9	1,430.4
Source 1: Yr.no
Source 2: Se klima

Climate data for Hovlandsdal 1991–2020 (85 m)
Month	Jan	Feb	Mar	Apr	May	Jun	Jul	Aug	Sep	Oct	Nov	Dec	Year
Average precipitation mm (inches)	374.7 (14.75)	313.1 (12.33)	289.6 (11.40)	186.8 (7.35)	172.4 (6.79)	186.1 (7.33)	198.2 (7.80)	239.4 (9.43)	348.1 (13.70)	355.7 (14.00)	367.7 (14.48)	395.0 (15.55)	3,426.8 (134.91)
Average precipitation days (≥ 1.0 mm)	20	17	17	14	14	14	16	17	17	18	18	19	201
Source: NOAA WMO averages 91-2020 Norway
