= Byrknes =

Village in Gulen Municipality, Norway

- Village
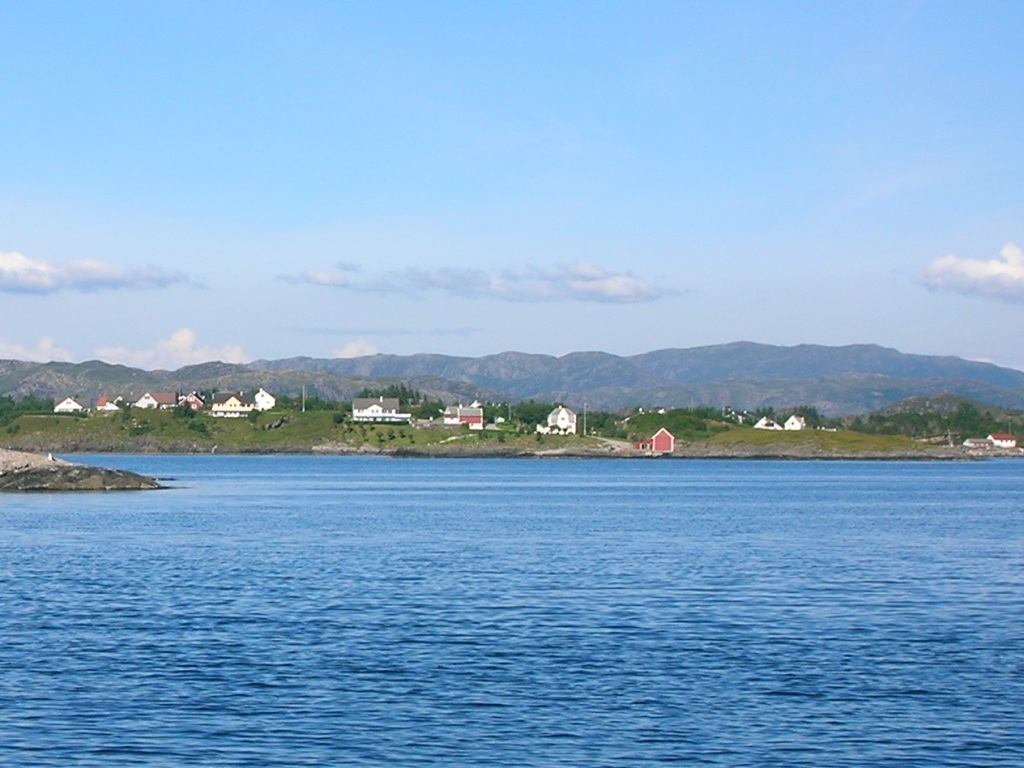
- View of Byrknes
- Interactive map of Byrknes
- Location within Vestland Location within Norway
- Coordinates: 60.89916°N 4.83785°E
- Country: Norway
- Region: Western Norway
- County: Vestland
- District: Sogn
- Municipality: Gulen Municipality

Area
  - Total: 0.51 km^{2} (0.20 sq mi)
- Elevation: 8 m (26 ft)

Population (2025)
  - Total: 289
  - Density: 567/km^{2} (1,470/sq mi)
- Time zone: UTC+01:00 (CET)
  - Summer (DST): UTC+02:00 (CEST)
- Post Code: 5970 Byrknesøy

Byrknes is a fishing village in Gulen Municipality in Vestland county, Norway. It is located on the western shore of the island of Byrknesøyna. It is about 16 kilometres (9.9 mi) southwest of the municipal center of Eivindvik, about 17 kilometres (11 mi) west of the village of Dalsøyra, and about 14 kilometres (8.7 mi) northwest of the Mongstad industrial area which is located on the border of the neighboring Alver Municipality and Austrheim Municipality to the south. The Sognesjøen strait is located to the northwest of the village.

The 0.51-square-kilometre (130-acre) village has a population (2025) of 289 and a population density of 567 inhabitants per square kilometre (1,470/sq mi).

The Kystmuseum, a coastal museum, has been located in Byrknes since 30 May 1998. The nearest church is Mjømna Church, located about 7 kilometres (4.3 mi) to the northeast in the village of Mjømna on the neighboring island of Mjømna. It is connected to the mainland by a series of bridges over the island and neighboring islands to the east.
