= Holck =

Holck may refer to

- Anne Holck, a 17th-century Danish noble
- Conrad Holck, an 18th-century Danish nobleman and courtier
- Eiler Holck, a 17th-century Danish military officer
- Heinrich Holk, also spelled Henrik Holck, a 17th-century Danish-German mercenary
- Henning Holck-Larsen, a 20th-century Danish engineer
- Niels Holck, a Danish activist
- Ole Elias Holck, a Norwegian military officer and representative at the Norwegian Constitutional Assembly in 1814
- Oluf Holck, a Norwegian politician
