= Grønlid School =

School building in Rutledal, Norway

Coordinates: 61°04′23″N 5°09′18″E

Grønlid School Norwegian: Grønlid skule
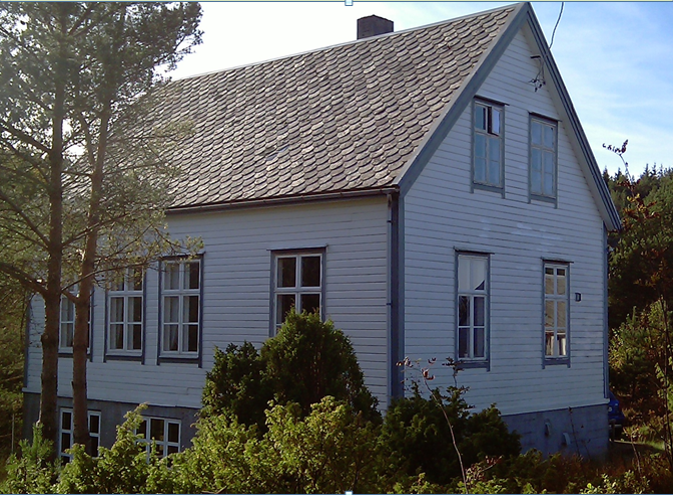

Information
- Established: 1931
- Closed: 1973

Grønlid School (Norwegian: Grønlid skule) is located at Rutledal in Gulen Municipality in Vestland, Norway. It was built in 1931 and in use as a school until 1973. During the German occupation of Norway, the building was used to house occupation forces.

== Description ==
Grønlid School was constructed at the east side of Kvernhushaugen in Rutle (an area within Gulen Municipality) equidistant to the homes in hamlets of Rutledal, Rutletangane, and Brosvik. The schoolhouse was both a school and a dwelling for the teacher. It consisted of one classroom, kitchen and living room on the ground floor, two bedrooms and a large attic upstairs and a full basement downstairs. The building was constructed with timber walls and horizontal clap boarding and the roof covered with slate, resting on a concrete foundation.

== History ==
=== Establishment ===
After a recommendation from the school board in Gulen, the municipal board determined on March 4, 1929 to construct a school in Rutledal.

The school board in Gulen assembled on March 15, 1930 and the protocol shows that the case is now being handled for the third time due to protests. The school board upheld the sub-committee's recommendation for location. On March 18, 1930 the land was established as an independent property in the land register. On July 13, 1930, the municipality board convened with the construction of the school in Rutledal as the first agenda item. Builder Nils H. Austbø had provided the lowest bid at crowns 8,650 and was awarded the contract. The building in Rutledal was completed in 1931, and Grønlid School was inaugurated.

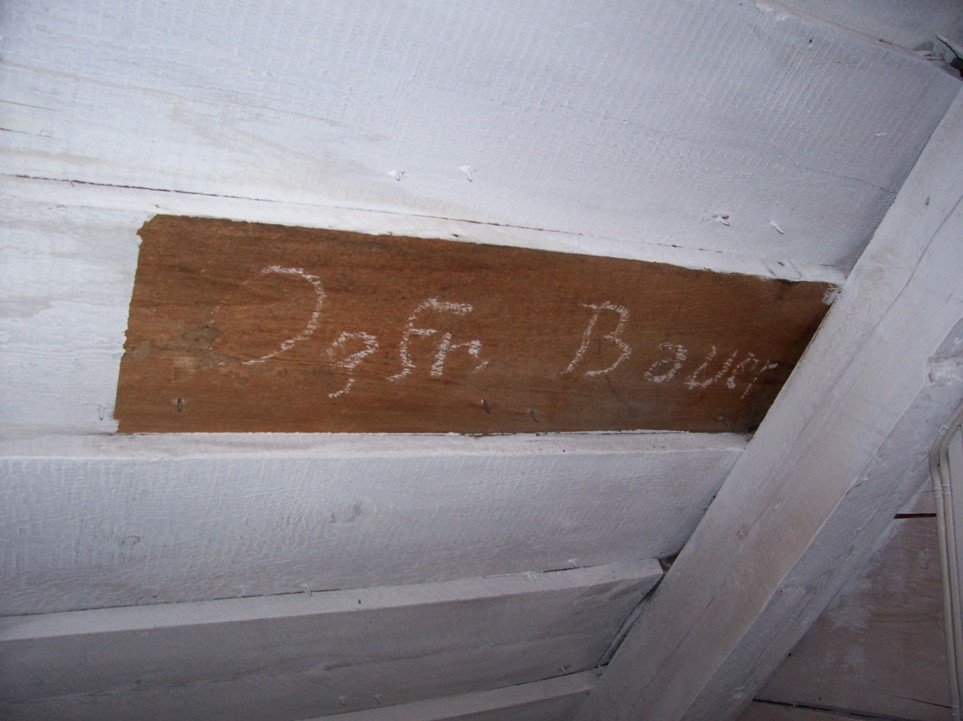
A German soldier wrote his name on the wall

=== War years ===
During the German occupation of Norway (1940-1945), military personnel from the occupation forces were stationed in Rutledal in connection with extensive military installations such as a torpedo battery, coastal fortifications and a station for the infantry Fortet på Risenes). The occupation forces lodged military personnel both in their own newly constructed barracks as well as in existing buildings and appropriated space both in private homes as well as public buildings. German soldiers were accommodated at Grønlid School while it was continued to be used as a school and with the teacher living in the building.

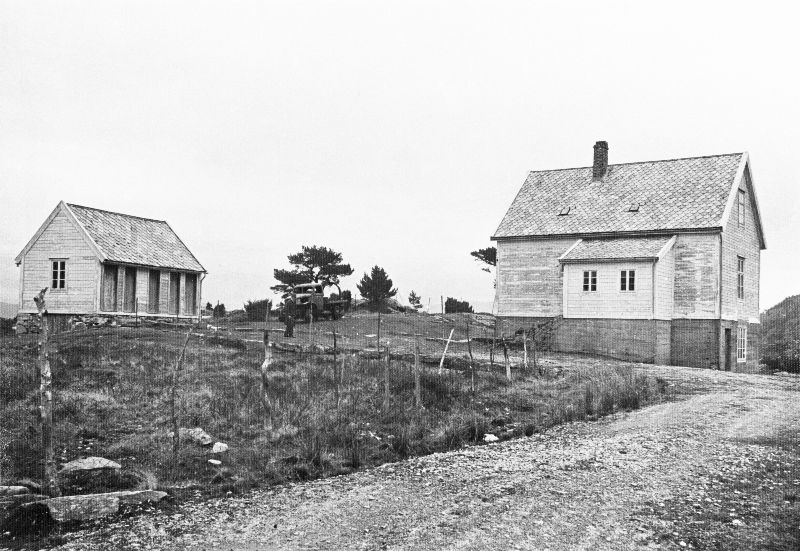
Grønlid School ca. 1960

=== Centralization and closure ===
With improved roads from the 1950s onward, several schools in the district were gradually decommissioned and the pupils transferred to central schools. Grønlid School was connected to the road system in 1962, and after Norwegian county road Fv7 was constructed from Haveland in Nordgulen to Eivindvik, the school was closed in 1973 and the pupils transferred to Eivindvik School.

=== Community assembly house ===
From 1973, the schoolhouse in Rutledal was in use as a community assembly house and also as accommodations for construction workers in connection with building the new ferry quay in Rutledal which was opened in 1975 and in enlarging the radio and television transmitter at Brosviksåta.

After several years of use for community assembly and accommodations without sufficient maintenance, a disagreement arose in the local community as to any investment in restoration. The solution was to put the property up for sale, and on March 15, 1996, it was sold as a leisure home to a private individual and has since been fully restored and conserved for the future.

It functioned as a one-room schoolhouse.
