= Dingja =

Village in Gulen Municipality, Norway

- Village
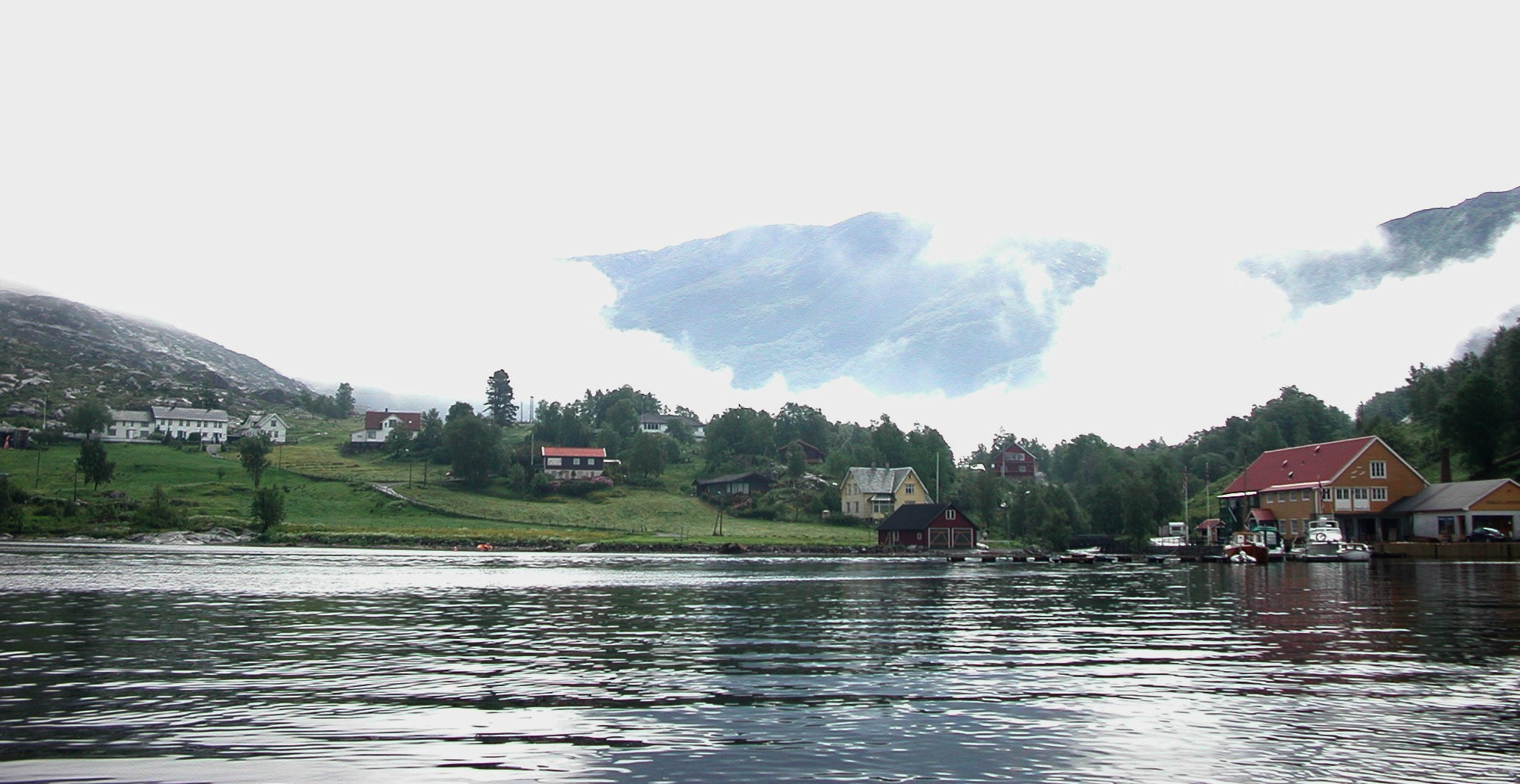
- Seaside front of Dingja
- Interactive map of Dingja
- Location within Vestland Location within Norway
- Coordinates: 61.03333°N 5.05°E
- Country: Norway
- Region: Western Norway
- County: Vestland
- District: Sogn
- Municipality: Gulen Municipality
- Elevation: 73 m (240 ft)
- Time zone: UTC+01:00 (CET)
  - Summer (DST): UTC+02:00 (CEST)
- Post Code: 5966 Eivindvik

Dingja is a small village in Gulen Municipality in Vestland county in Western Norway. The village is located along the Sognesjøen, near the mouth of the Sognefjorden, about 5 kilometres (3.1 mi) north of the municipal center of Eivindvik. The lake Dingevatnet lies directly to the east of the village, and the island of Hiserøyna lies just offshore to the southwest.

Dingja is home to about 40 inhabitants in the wintertime, but the population grows in summer. Due to the beautiful nature, many people from Bergen come visiting their cabins in the regions nearby, or stop by in their boats. There is also a tiny grocery store.
