= Mjømna (island) =

Island in Gulen, Norway

- Interactive map of Mjømna

Geography
- Location: Vestland, Norway
- Coordinates: 60.9158°N 4.9354°E
- Area: 10.2 km^{2} (3.9 sq mi)
- Length: 6.2 km (3.85 mi)
- Width: 2.5 km (1.55 mi)
- Highest elevation: 194 m (636 ft)
- Highest point: Mjømnefjellet

Administration
- Norway
- County: Vestland
- Municipality: Gulen Municipality

Demographics
- Population: 60 (2001)

Mjømna is an island in Gulen Municipality in Vestland county, Norway. The island sits off the mainland coast in southwestern Gulen, and it is part of a large archipelago of islands. The main islands that surround Mjømna include Byrknesøyna (to the west), Sandøyna (to the east), and Hisarøyna (to the northeast). The Fensfjorden flows south of the island and the Gulafjorden and Sognesjøen flow along the north of the island.

The 10.2-square-kilometre (3.9 sq mi) island is fairly flat and swampy with the highest point being the 194-metre (636 ft) tall Mjømnefjellet on the north end of the island. There were 60 people living on the island in 2001, and the majority of them live on the western side of the island in the village of Mjømna, where Mjømna Church is located.

== See also ==
- List of islands of Norway
