= Ola Byrknes =

Norwegian politician

Ola Byrknes (4 April 1933-30 November 2011) was a Norwegian politician for the Centre Party.

He served as a deputy representative to the Norwegian Parliament from Sogn og Fjordane during the 1973–1977 term.

On the local level he was a member of the municipal council of Gulen Municipality from 1972 to 1999, serving as mayor from 1976 to 1978 and 1983 to 1999. He was a member of Sogn og Fjordane county council from 1976 to 1980.

He was also active in the Norwegian Association of Local and Regional Authorities.
