= Ole Elias Holck =

Norwegian military officer

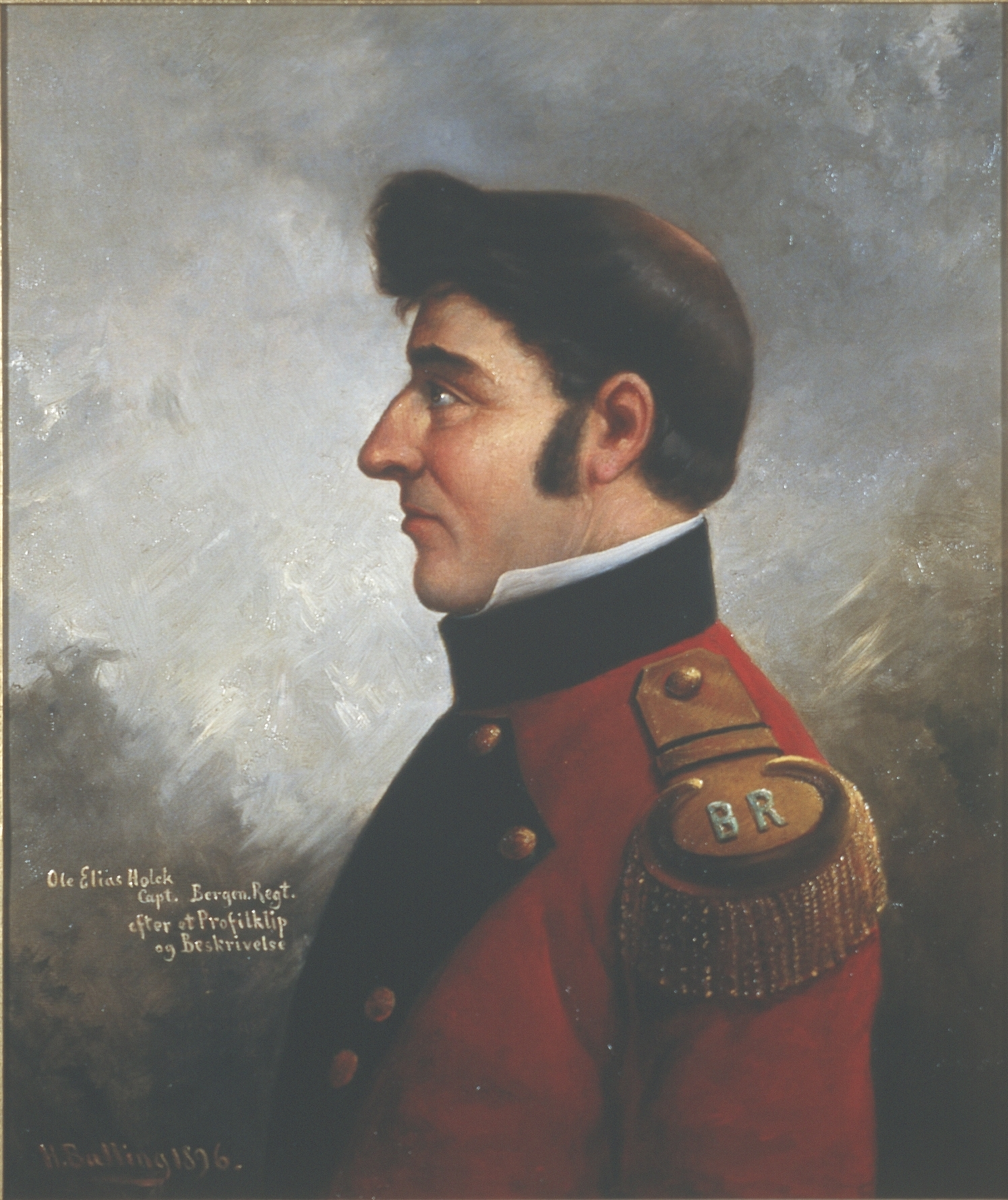
- Ole Elias Holck, 1896 painting by Ole Peter Hansen Balling
- Born: 6 January 1774; Eivindvik, Norway
- Died: 14 July 1842 (aged 68)
- Occupation: military officer
- Known for: Member of the Norwegian Constitutional Assembly, 1814; Member of the Storting
- Awards: Order of the Sword

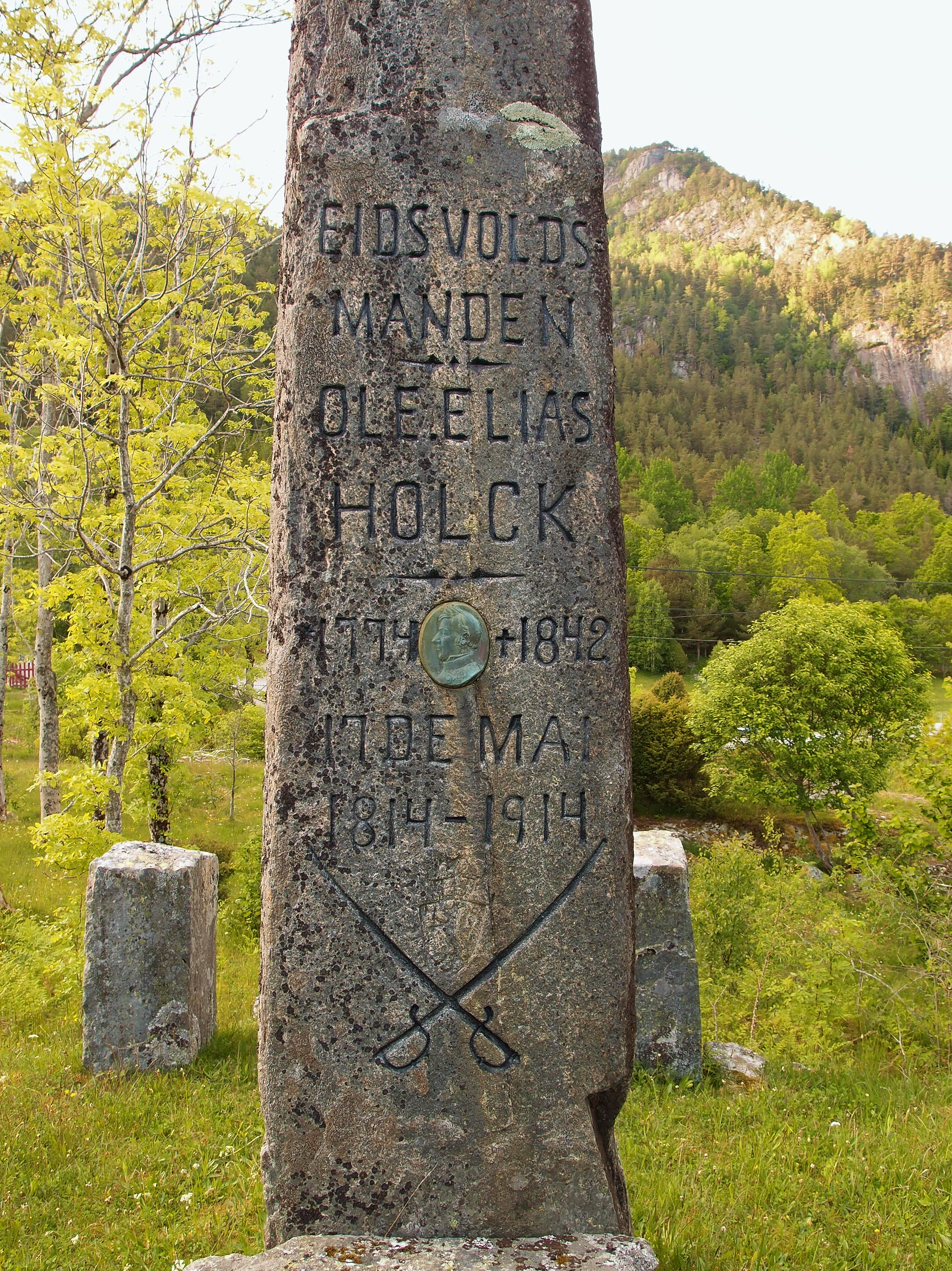
Memorial stone to Ole Elias Holck, erected in Lavik during 1914

Ole Elias Holck (6 January 1774 – 14 July 1842) was a Norwegian military officer who served as a representative at the Norwegian Constitutional Assembly.

Ole Elias Holck was born at the village of Eivindvik (in present-day Gulen Municipality) in Nordre Bergenhus county, Norway. He was the third of 14 children born to a military family. He was married in 1812 with Karen Sophie Hansen (1786–1873). The couple took over her parents' farm in the parish of Lavik, where they raised their family. He was made a Second Lieutenant in the Sogndal Company in 1797 and promoted to First Lieutenant in the Nordhordland Company during 1801. He advanced to company commander in Bergen Regiment in 1809. In 1818, he became chief of Søndfjordske Musketeer Corps. He was promoted to Colonel in 1828 and Adjutant General in 1834. He received discharged from military service in 1841.

He represented the Bergenhus Infantry Regiment (Bergenhusiske Infanteri-Regiment ) at the Norwegian Constituent Assembly at Eidsvoll Manor in 1814 where he supported the independence party (Selvstendighetspartiet). He was later a member of the Parliament of Norway, where he represented Nordre Bergenhus Amt during the periods 1818–20, 1824–26 and 1839–41. He was decorated Knight of the Swedish Order of the Sword in 1818.

== Related reading ==
- Holme Jørn (2014) De kom fra alle kanter - Eidsvollsmennene og deres hus (Oslo: Cappelen Damm) ISBN 978-82-02-44564-5
