= Mjømna =

Village in Gulen Municipality, Norway

- Village
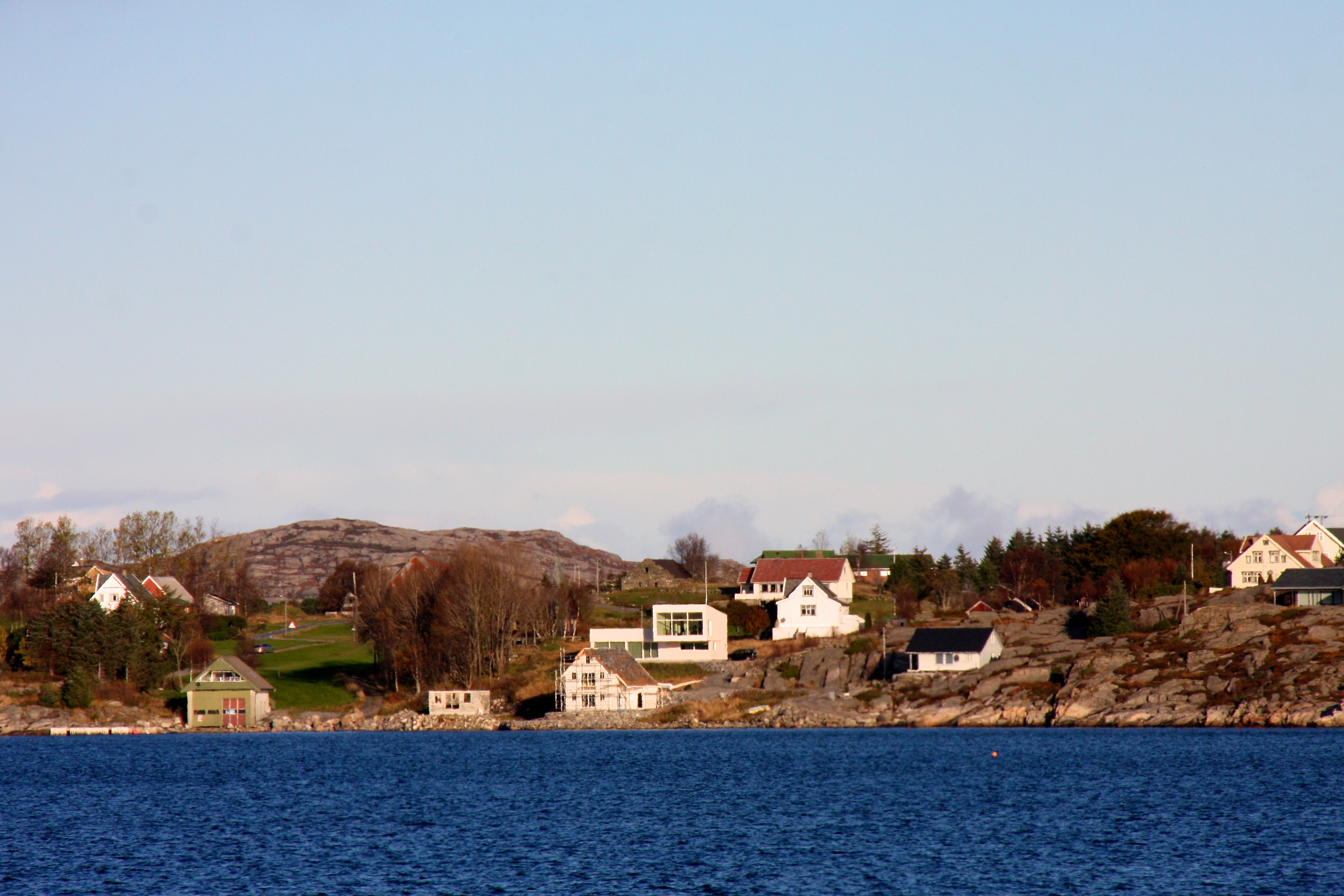
- View of the village Credit: Bjarne Thune
- Interactive map of Mjømna
- Location within Vestland Location within Norway
- Coordinates: 60.91831°N 4.90454°E
- Country: Norway
- Region: Western Norway
- County: Vestland
- District: Sogn
- Municipality: Gulen Municipality
- Elevation: 16 m (52 ft)
- Time zone: UTC+01:00 (CET)
  - Summer (DST): UTC+02:00 (CEST)
- Post Code: 5978 Mjømna

Mjømna is a village in Gulen Municipality in Vestland county, Norway. The village is located on the western shore of the island of Mjømna. The village is the largest settlement on the island. Mjømna Church is located in the village, serving the residents of the southwestern part of the municipality. The village sits roughly halfway between the neighboring villages of Byrknes (to the west) and Ånneland (to the east). All of these villages are connected to each other (and to the mainland) by a series of bridges which connect the main islands in western Gulen.
