= Dalsøyra =

Village in Gulen Municipality, Norway

- Village
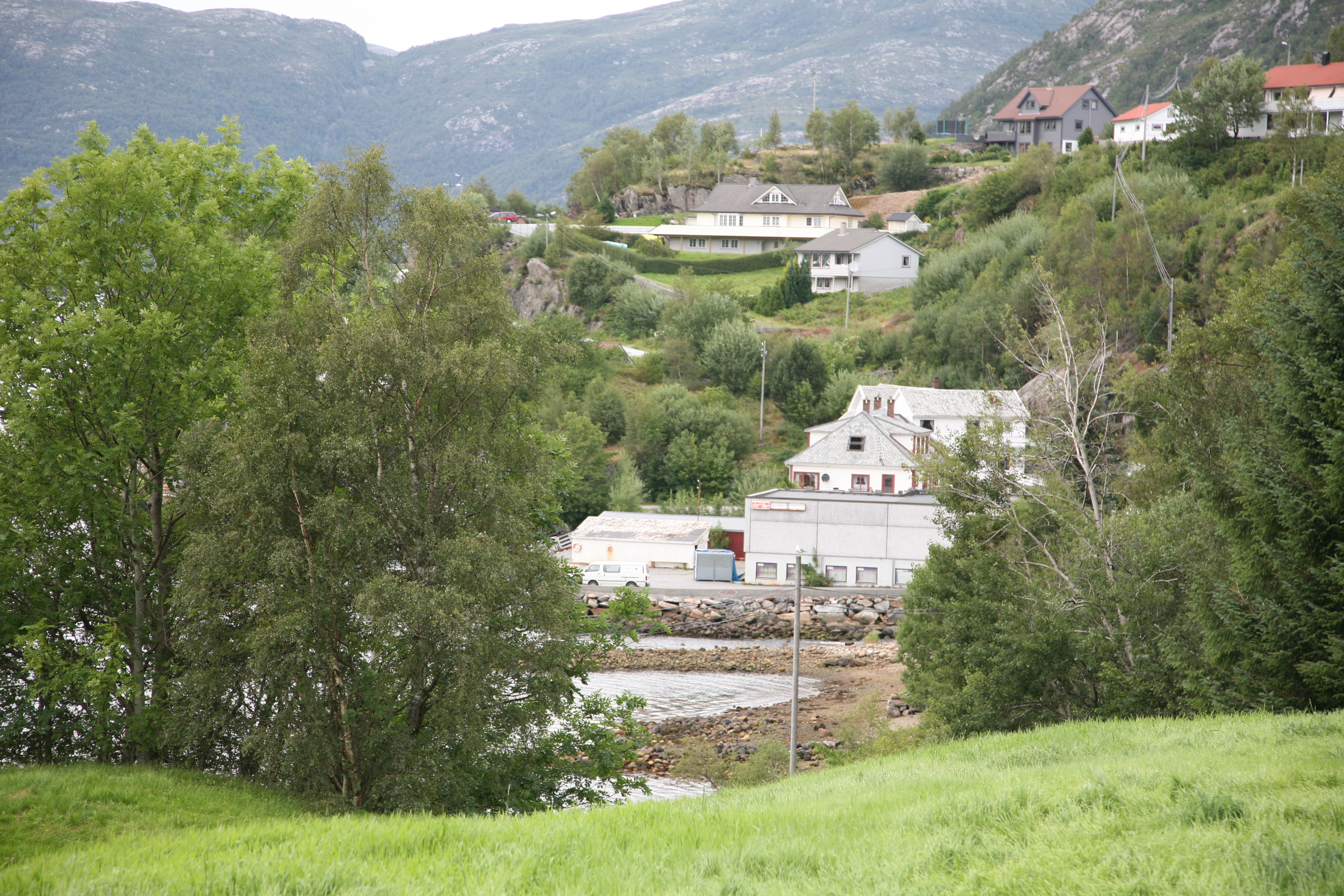
- View of Dalsøyra
- Interactive map of Dalsøyra
- Location within Vestland Location within Norway
- Coordinates: 60.93324°N 5.13556°E
- Country: Norway
- Region: Western Norway
- County: Vestland
- District: Sogn
- Municipality: Gulen Municipality
- Elevation: 5 m (16 ft)

Population (2001)
  - Total: 213
- Time zone: UTC+01:00 (CET)
  - Summer (DST): UTC+02:00 (CEST)
- Post Code: 5960 Dalsøyra

Dalsøyra is a village in Gulen Municipality in Vestland county, Norway. The village is located on the western coast of the mainland, along the Eidsfjorden, an arm of the Gulafjorden, about 6 kilometres (3.7 mi) southeast of the municipal center of Eivindvik. The population of Dalsøyra (2001) was 213. Dalsøyra is an old fishing village, and today there is a school and a shop in the village.
