= Sandøyna =

Island in Gulen, Norway

Sandøyna Sandøya (unofficial)
- Interactive map of Sandøyna; Sandøya (unofficial)

Geography
- Location: Vestland, Norway
- Coordinates: 60.8903°N 4.9988°E
- Area: 31.6 km^{2} (12.2 sq mi)
- Length: 11.5 km (7.15 mi)
- Width: 3.3 km (2.05 mi)

Administration
- Norway
- County: Vestland
- Municipality: Gulen Municipality

Demographics
- Population: 230 (2001)

Sandøyna is the largest island in Gulen Municipality in Vestland county, Norway. The 31.6-square-kilometre (12.2 sq mi) island lies just west of the mainland in a large archipelago of islands that sit north of the Fensfjorden, southeast of the Sognesjøen, and south of the Gulafjorden. Sandøyna is the largest island in Gulen Municipality. The islands of Mjømna and Byrknesøyna lie just west of Sandøyna. These three islands are connected to the mainland by a series of bridges. The bridge from Sandøyna to the mainland was completed in 2010, thus eliminating the old ferry route from the island to the mainland. The largest settlement is the village of Ånneland on the western coast of the island.

== See also ==
- List of islands of Norway
