= Byrknesøyna =

Island in Gulen, Norway

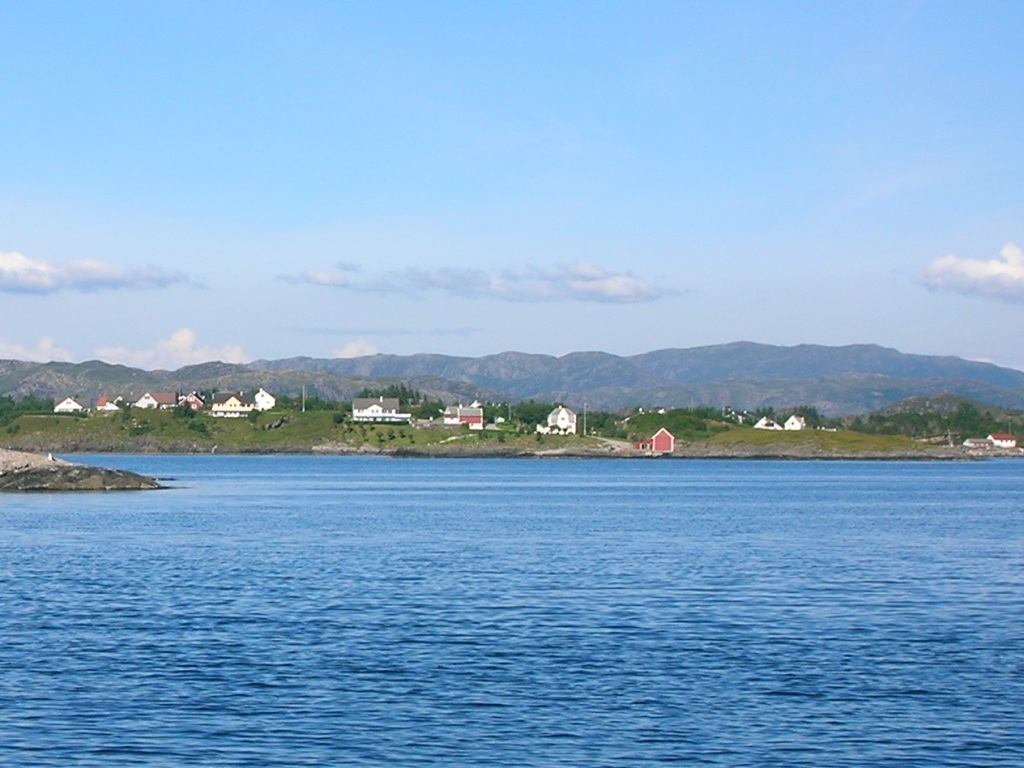
- Looking east towards Byrkenesøyna
- Interactive map of Byrknesøyna

Geography
- Location: Vestland, Norway
- Coordinates: 60.8939°N 4.8888°E
- Area: 18.3 km^{2} (7.1 sq mi)
- Length: 7.5 km (4.66 mi)
- Width: 4 km (2.5 mi)
- Highest elevation: 194 m (636 ft)
- Highest point: Veten

Administration
- Norway
- County: Vestland
- Municipality: Gulen Municipality

Byrknesøyna is an island in Gulen Municipality in Vestland county, Norway. The 18-square-kilometre (6.9 sq mi) island lies between the Sognesjøen and the Fensfjorden, just west of the island of Mjømna. It is located about 13 kilometres (8.1 mi) straight southwest of the municipal centre of Eivindvik and about 80 kilometres (50 mi) north of the city of Bergen.

Almost all of the inhabitants live in the village of Byrknes on the northwestern coast of the island. There are thousands of small (mostly uninhabited) islets surrounding Byrknesøyna. The island is connected to the mainland by a series of bridges heading to the east which connect Byrknesøyna to Mjømna island, then to Sandøyna island, and then on to the mainland. The highest point on the island is the 194-metre (636 ft) tall Veten. The island is covered by a typical western Norwegian heather moorland.

The island's residents are mostly engaged in the fishing industry. There are several fish farming operations as well as fish processing. There is also some sheep herding on the island.

== See also ==
- List of islands of Norway
