= Gulafjorden =

Fjord in Gulen, Norway

- Interactive map of the fjord
- Location: Vestland county, Norway
- Coordinates: 60.9642°N 5.0566°E
- Type: Fjord
- Primary outflows: Sognesjøen
- Basin countries: Norway
- Max. length: 8 kilometres (5.0 mi)
- Settlements: Eivindvik

Gulafjorden is a fjord in Gulen Municipality in Vestland county, Norway. The historic Gulating assemblies in medieval Norway took place in this area. Today, there are several salmon fish farms in the fjord.

The 8-kilometre (5.0 mi) long fjord flows from the Sognesjøen strait to the east towards the mainland. The islands of Byrknesøyna, Mjømna, and Sandøyna lie along the southern side of the fjord. The island of Hisarøyna lies on the northern side of the fjord. The village of Eivindvik, the municipal centre of Gulen Municipality lies on the mainland, along the northern coast of the fjord.

The fjord ends by splitting into three branches: the Eidsfjorden flows to the south, the Nordgulfjorden flows to the north, and the Austgulfjorden flows to the east. When you measure distance of the main fjord and the Austgulfjorden (the longest of its branches), it is 22 kilometres (14 mi) long.

== See also ==
- List of Norwegian fjords
