= Dingevatnet =

Lake in Gulen, Norway

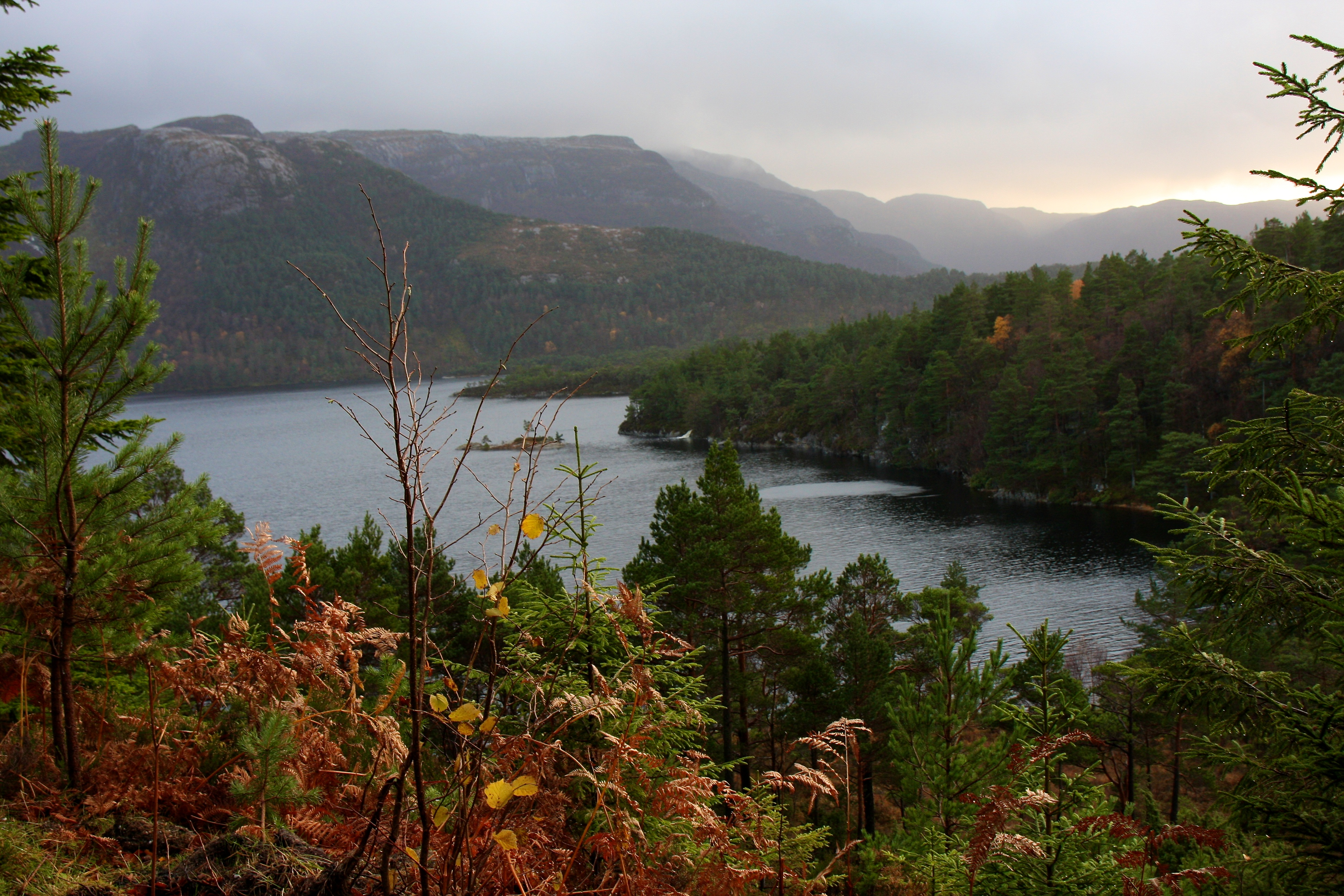
- View of the lake Credit: Bjarne Thune
- Interactive map of the lake
- Location: Gulen Municipality, Vestland
- Coordinates: 61.0360°N 5.0877°E
- Type: Glacial lake
- Primary inflows: Eikedalselva from Brossvikvatnet
- Primary outflows: Dingjaelva
- Catchment area: 27.47 km^{2} (10.61 sq mi)
- Basin countries: Norway
- Max. length: 3 km (1.9 mi)
- Max. width: 1.6 km (0.99 mi)
- Surface area: 2.85 km^{2} (1.10 sq mi)
- Average depth: 88 m (289 ft)
- Max. depth: 220 m (720 ft)
- Water volume: 0.251 km^{3} (0.060 cu mi)
- Shore length^{1}: 14 km (8.7 mi)
- Surface elevation: 26 m (85 ft)
- Islands: Øyna
- Settlements: Dingja
- References: NVE
- ^{1} Shore length is not a well-defined measure.

Dingevatnet is the 18th deepest lake in Norway, reaching a maximum depth of 220 metres (720 ft). It is located in Gulen Municipality in Vestland county. The 2.84-square-kilometre (1.10 sq mi) lake is located just east of the village of Dingja, about 1 kilometre (0.62 mi) southeast of the mouth of the Sognefjorden. The lake lies about 4 kilometres (2.5 mi) north of the municipal center of Eivindvik. The lake flows out into the small Dingjaelva river, which runs past the village of Dingja before emptying into the Sognesjøen strait.

== See also ==
- List of lakes of Norway
