= Gulen Municipality =

Municipality in Vestland, Norway

Gulen Municipality Gulen kommune
- Municipality
- Evindvig herred (historic name)
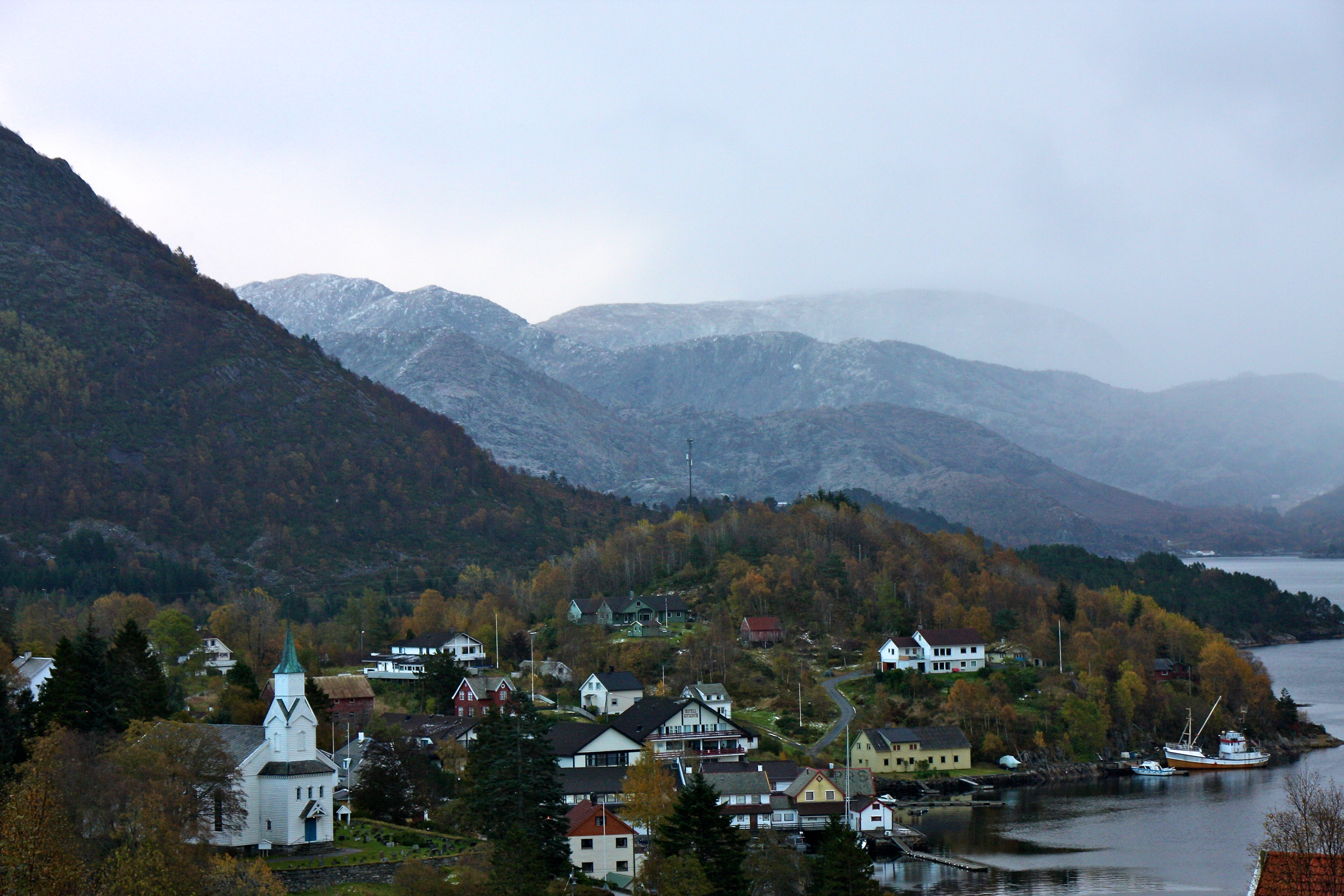
- View of Eivindvik; Credit: Bjarne Thune

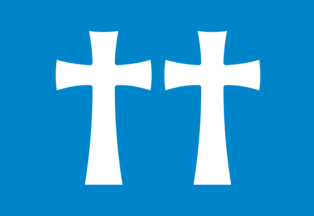
- Flag Coat of arms

- Vestland within Norway

- Gulen within Vestland
- Coordinates: 61°01′27″N 05°07′10″E
- Country: Norway
- County: Vestland
- District: Sogn
- Established: 1 Jan 1838
  - Created as: Formannskapsdistrikt
- Administrative centre: Eivindvik

Government
  - Mayor (2023): May-Lynn Osland (Ap)

Area
  - Total: 599.41 km^{2} (231.43 sq mi)
  - Land: 577.10 km^{2} (222.82 sq mi)
  - Water: 22.31 km^{2} (8.61 sq mi) 3.7%
  - Rank: #189 in Norway
- Highest elevation: 877.44 m (2,878.7 ft)

Population (2025)
  - Total: 2,260
  - Rank: #266 in Norway
  - Density: 3.8/km^{2} (9.8/sq mi)
  - Change (10 years): ▼ −3.5%
- Demonym: Guling

Official language
  - Norwegian form: Nynorsk
- Time zone: UTC+01:00 (CET)
  - Summer (DST): UTC+02:00 (CEST)
- ISO 3166 code: NO-4635
- Website: Official website

Gulen is a municipality in the western part of Vestland county, Norway. It is part of the traditional district of Sogn. The administrative center of the municipality is the village of Eivindvik. Other villages in Gulen include Brekke, Byrknes, Dalsøyra, Dingja, Instefjord, Mjømna, Oppedal, and Rutledal.

The 599-square-kilometre (231 sq mi) municipality is the 189th largest by area out of the 357 municipalities in Norway. Gulen Municipality is the 266th most populous municipality in Norway with a population of 2,260. The municipality's population density is 3.8 inhabitants per square kilometre (9.8/sq mi) and its population has decreased by 3.5% over the previous 10-year period.

Gulen Municipality sits to the south of the Sognefjorden and it surrounds the Gulafjorden, which is considered to be the place where Norway's west-coastal Vikings met for the Gulating, a governing body. The area along the Gulafjorden called Flolid (just east of the village of Eivindvik) is now a national historic place, where an open-air theater and annual summer play commemorates the Vikings who gathered there 1000 years ago to accept Christianity.

In 2016, the chief of police for Vestlandet formally suggested a reconfiguration of police districts and stations. He proposed that the police station in Gulen be closed.

== General information ==
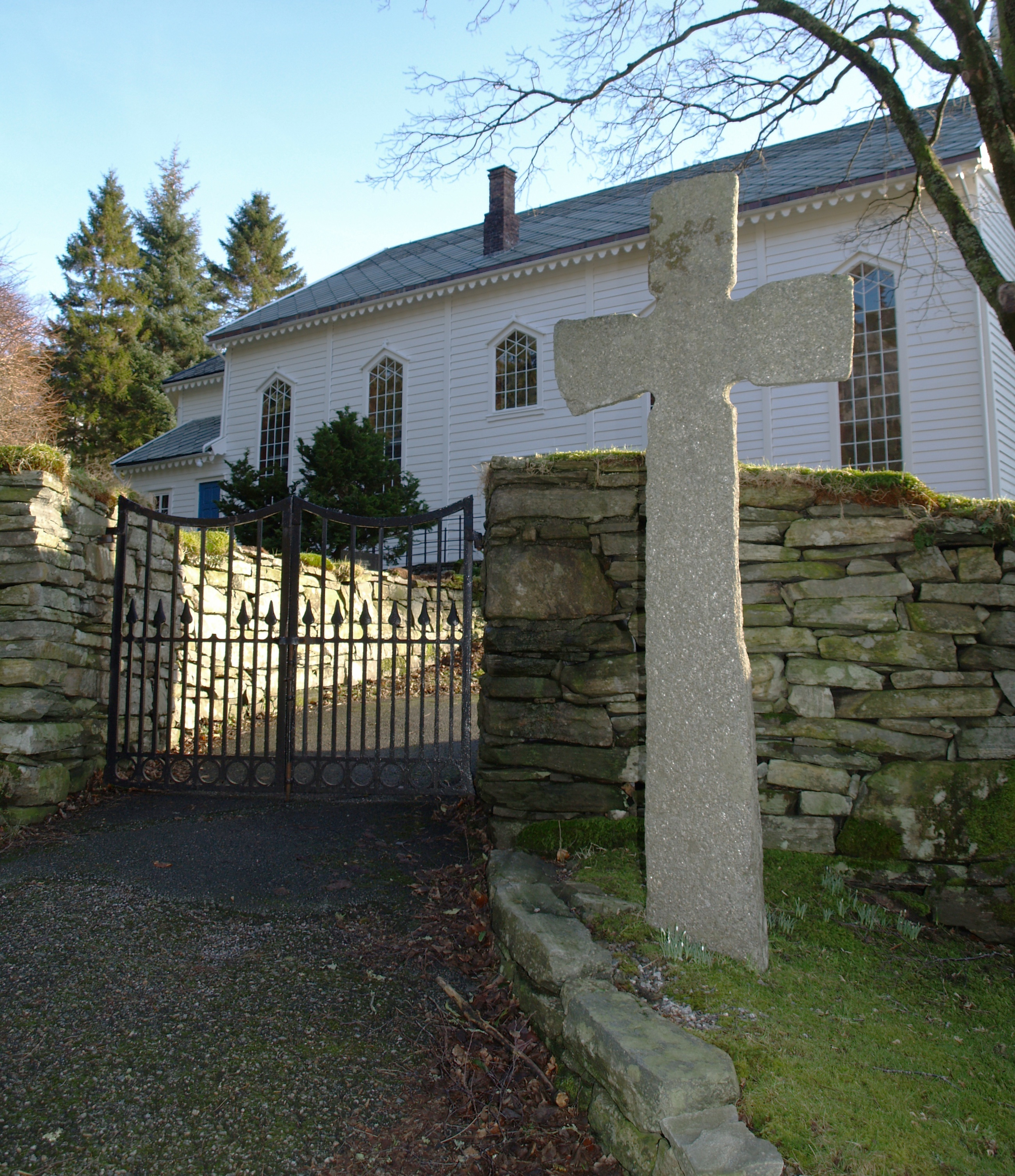
One of the stone crosses near Eivindvik

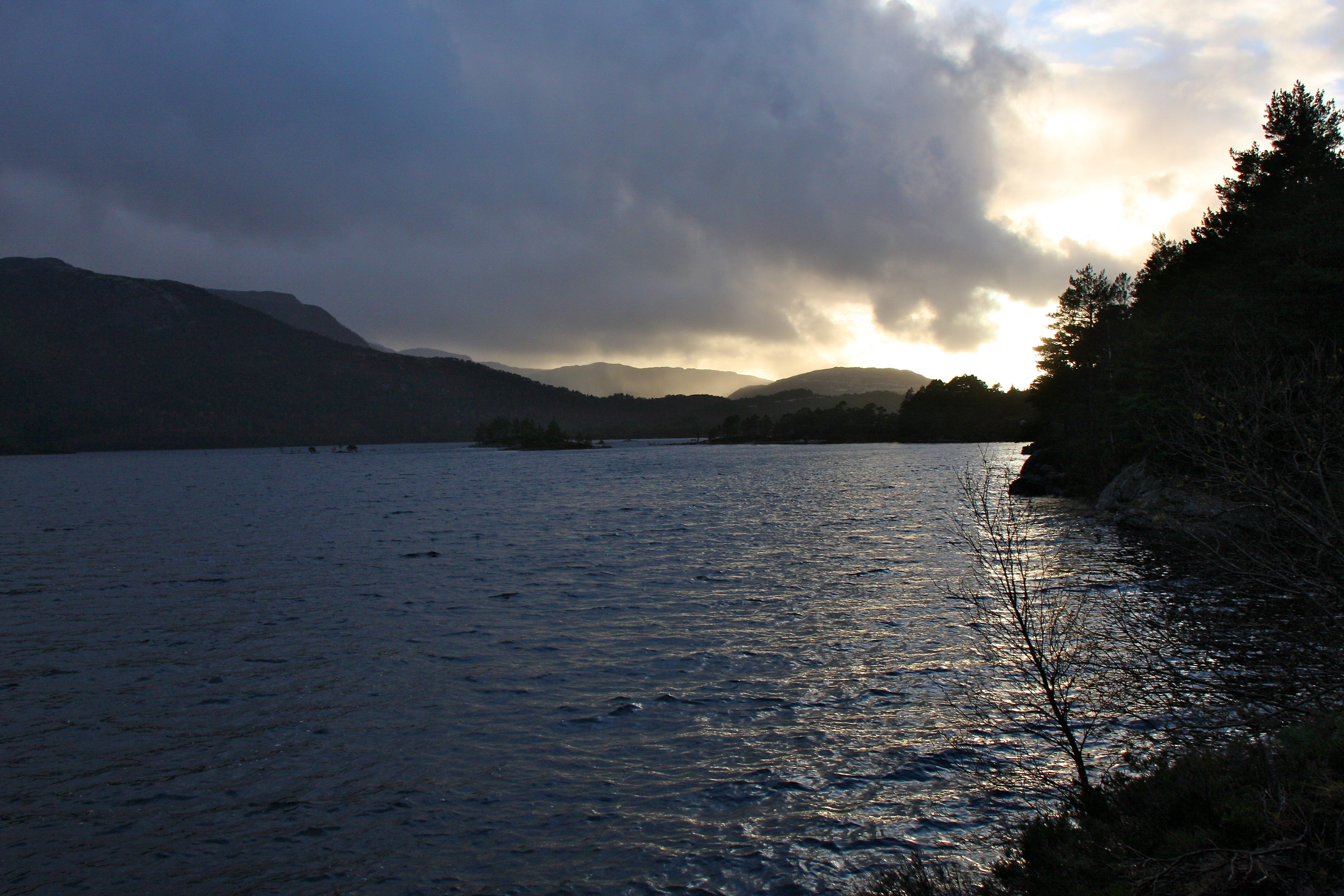
View of the lake Dingevatnet

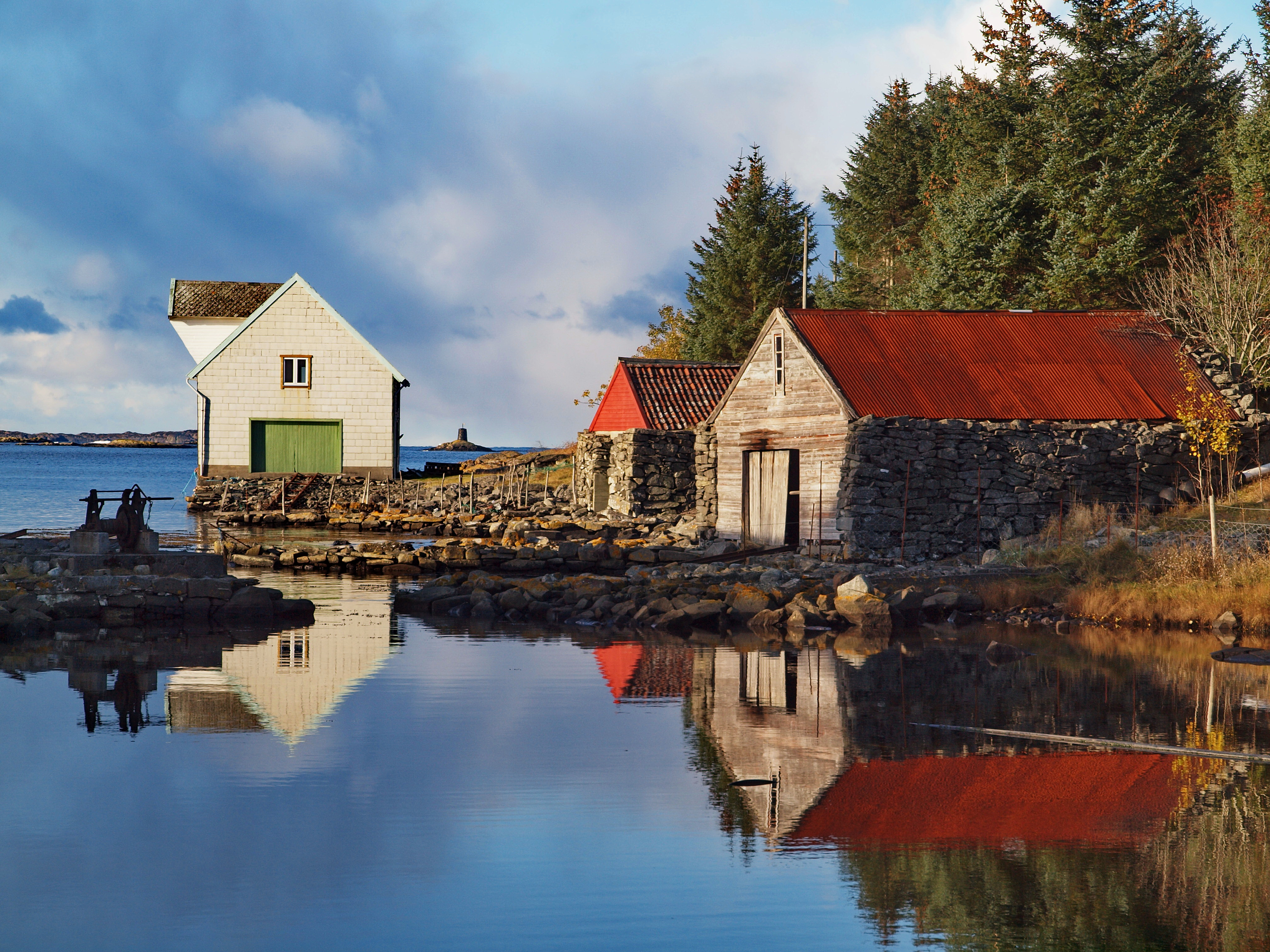
Old boathouses near Byrknes. Credit: Frode Inge Helland.

The parish of Evindvig was established as a municipality on 1 January 1838 (see formannskapsdistrikt law). The municipality of 1838 was created to be identical to the Evindvig Church of Norway prestegjeld that included the three parishes (sokn) of Evindvig, Brekke, and Husøy.

In 1850, the eastern part of the municipality (population: 898) split off to became the new Brekke Municipality which reduced the size of Evindvig Municipality (population: 3,944). (Later, Brekke Municipality was merged with Lavik Municipality and became Lavik og Brekke Municipality. This was short-lived and Brekke Municipality later became a separate municipality once again.) In 1858, the western part of the municipality (population: 1,384) was separated from Evindvig Municipality to become the new Utvær Municipality. This reduced Evindvig Municipality to a population of 3,018. (in 1923, Utvær Municipality was renamed Solund Municipality). On 1 July 1890, the name of Evindvig Municipality was officially changed to Gulen Municipality.

During the 1960s, there were many municipal mergers across Norway due to the work of the Schei Committee. On 1 January 1964, the following areas were merged to for a new, larger Gulen Municipality (population: 3,250):

- all of Brekke Municipality (population: 782)
- all of Gulen Municipality (population: 2,428)
- the island of Losna from Solund Municipality (population: 40)

Historically, this municipality was part of the old Sogn og Fjordane county. On 1 January 2020, the municipality became a part of the newly-formed Vestland county (after Hordaland and Sogn og Fjordane counties were merged).

=== Name ===
The municipality (originally the parish) was originally named after the old Evindvig farm (Old Norse: Eyvindarvík, now spelled Eivindvik) since the first Evindvig Church was built there. The first element is derived from the male name Eyvindr. The last element is vík which means "small bay", "cove", or "inlet".

Historically, the name of the municipality was spelled Evindvig. On 1 July 1890, a royal resolution changed the name of the municipality to Gulen. The new name Gulen (Old Norse: Guli) was the original name of the local Gulafjorden. The name is probably derived from the word gul which means "(strong) wind" or "gale".

=== Coat of arms ===
The coat of arms was granted on 9 February 1990. The official blazon is "Azure, two Latin crosses formée argent" (Norwegian: På blå grunn to utbøygde sølv krossar). This means the arms have a blue field (background) and the charge is a set of two Latin crosses that are designed as a cross formée. The charge has a tincture of argent which means it is commonly colored white, but if it is made out of metal, then silver is used. The crosses represent the two stone crosses found near the village of Eivindvik that are believed to be about 1000 years old, erected there in 1023 after the Vikings who met at the Gulating gathering embraced Christianity. These are some of the oldest monuments to Christianity still existing in Norway. One of the crosses was damaged by a falling tree in 2012. The arms were designed by Even Jarl Skoglund. The municipal flag has the same design as the coat of arms.

=== Churches ===
The Church of Norway has three parishes(sokn) within Gulen Municipality. It is part of the Nordhordland prosti (deanery) in the Diocese of Bjørgvin.

Churches in Gulen Municipality
Parish (sokn)	Church name	Location of the church	Year built
Brekke	Brekke Church	Brekke	1862
Gulen	Gulen Church	Eivindvik	1863
Mjømna	Mjømna Church	Mjømna	1901

=== Schools ===
The roughly 2,500 residents live scattered throughout the municipality and are divided into four school districts: Brekke, Eivindvik, Dalsøyra, and Byrknes.

== Government ==
Gulen Municipality is responsible for primary education (through 10th grade), outpatient health services, senior citizen services, welfare and other social services, zoning, economic development, and municipal roads and utilities. The municipality is governed by a municipal council of directly elected representatives. The mayor is indirectly elected by a vote of the municipal council. The municipality is under the jurisdiction of the Sogn og Fjordane District Court and the Gulating Court of Appeal.

=== Municipal council ===
The municipal council (Kommunestyre) of Gulen Municipality is made up of 21 representatives that are elected to four year terms. The tables below show the current and historical composition of the council by political party.

Gulen kommunestyre 2023–2027
Party name (in Nynorsk)	Number of representatives
Labour Party (Arbeidarpartiet)	4
Conservative Party (Høgre)	7
Christian Democratic Party (Kristeleg Folkeparti)	2
Centre Party (Senterpartiet)	7
Liberal Party (Venstre)	1
Total number of members:	21

Gulen kommunestyre 2019–2023
Party name (in Nynorsk)	Number of representatives
Labour Party (Arbeidarpartiet)	4
Conservative Party (Høgre)	6
Christian Democratic Party (Kristeleg Folkeparti)	1
Centre Party (Senterpartiet)	9
Liberal Party (Venstre)	1
Total number of members:	21

Gulen kommunestyre 2015–2019
Party name (in Nynorsk)	Number of representatives
Labour Party (Arbeidarpartiet)	3
Conservative Party (Høgre)	5
Christian Democratic Party (Kristeleg Folkeparti)	1
Centre Party (Senterpartiet)	9
Liberal Party (Venstre)	3
Total number of members:	21

Gulen kommunestyre 2011–2015
Party name (in Nynorsk)	Number of representatives
Labour Party (Arbeidarpartiet)	2
Progress Party (Framstegspartiet)	1
Conservative Party (Høgre)	5
Christian Democratic Party (Kristeleg Folkeparti)	2
Centre Party (Senterpartiet)	8
Liberal Party (Venstre)	3
Total number of members:	21

Gulen kommunestyre 2007–2011
Party name (in Nynorsk)	Number of representatives
Labour Party (Arbeidarpartiet)	3
Conservative Party (Høgre)	4
Christian Democratic Party (Kristeleg Folkeparti)	5
Centre Party (Senterpartiet)	6
Liberal Party (Venstre)	3
Total number of members:	21

Gulen kommunestyre 2003–2007
Party name (in Nynorsk)	Number of representatives
Labour Party (Arbeidarpartiet)	4
Conservative Party (Høgre)	4
Christian Democratic Party (Kristeleg Folkeparti)	5
Centre Party (Senterpartiet)	5
Liberal Party (Venstre)	3
Total number of members:	21

Gulen kommunestyre 1999–2003
Party name (in Nynorsk)	Number of representatives
Labour Party (Arbeidarpartiet)	5
Conservative Party (Høgre)	4
Christian Democratic Party (Kristeleg Folkeparti)	5
Centre Party (Senterpartiet)	4
Liberal Party (Venstre)	3
Total number of members:	21

Gulen kommunestyre 1995–1999
Party name (in Nynorsk)	Number of representatives
Labour Party (Arbeidarpartiet)	3
Conservative Party (Høgre)	2
Christian Democratic Party (Kristeleg Folkeparti)	3
Centre Party (Senterpartiet)	10
Liberal Party (Venstre)	3
Total number of members:	21

Gulen kommunestyre 1991–1995
Party name (in Nynorsk)	Number of representatives
Labour Party (Arbeidarpartiet)	4
Conservative Party (Høgre)	3
Christian Democratic Party (Kristeleg Folkeparti)	3
Centre Party (Senterpartiet)	8
Liberal Party (Venstre)	3
Total number of members:	21

Gulen kommunestyre 1987–1991
Party name (in Nynorsk)	Number of representatives
Labour Party (Arbeidarpartiet)	7
Conservative Party (Høgre)	5
Christian Democratic Party (Kristeleg Folkeparti)	3
Centre Party (Senterpartiet)	7
Liberal Party (Venstre)	3
Total number of members:	25

Gulen kommunestyre 1983–1987
Party name (in Nynorsk)	Number of representatives
Labour Party (Arbeidarpartiet)	6
Conservative Party (Høgre)	6
Christian Democratic Party (Kristeleg Folkeparti)	3
Centre Party (Senterpartiet)	7
Liberal Party (Venstre)	3
Total number of members:	25

Gulen kommunestyre 1979–1983
Party name (in Nynorsk)	Number of representatives
Labour Party (Arbeidarpartiet)	4
Conservative Party (Høgre)	7
Christian Democratic Party (Kristeleg Folkeparti)	3
Centre Party (Senterpartiet)	7
Non-political common list (Upolitisk Fellesliste)	4
Total number of members:	25

Gulen kommunestyre 1975–1979
Party name (in Nynorsk)	Number of representatives
Labour Party (Arbeidarpartiet)	3
Christian Democratic Party (Kristeleg Folkeparti)	3
Centre Party (Senterpartiet)	9
Non-party common list (Upolitiske Fellesliste)	10
Total number of members:	25

Gulen kommunestyre 1971–1975
Party name (in Nynorsk)	Number of representatives
Labour Party (Arbeidarpartiet)	6
Christian Democratic Party (Kristeleg Folkeparti)	4
Centre Party (Senterpartiet)	8
Liberal Party (Venstre)	6
Local List(s) (Lokale lister)	1
Total number of members:	25

Gulen kommunestyre 1967–1971
Party name (in Nynorsk)	Number of representatives
Labour Party (Arbeidarpartiet)	6
Conservative Party (Høgre)	1
Christian Democratic Party (Kristeleg Folkeparti)	4
Centre Party (Senterpartiet)	9
Liberal Party (Venstre)	9
Total number of members:	29

Gulen kommunestyre 1963–1967
Party name (in Nynorsk)	Number of representatives
Labour Party (Arbeidarpartiet)	5
Centre Party (Senterpartiet)	9
Liberal Party (Venstre)	8
Local List(s) (Lokale lister)	7
Total number of members:	29
Note: On 1 January 1964, Brekke Municipality became part of Gulen Municipality.

Gulen heradsstyre 1959–1963
Party name (in Nynorsk)	Number of representatives
Labour Party (Arbeidarpartiet)	6
Conservative Party (Høgre)	1
Centre Party (Senterpartiet)	7
Liberal Party (Venstre)	6
Local List(s) (Lokale lister)	9
Total number of members:	29

Gulen heradsstyre 1955–1959
Party name (in Nynorsk)	Number of representatives
Labour Party (Arbeidarpartiet)	7
Conservative Party (Høgre)	1
Farmers' Party (Bondepartiet)	8
Liberal Party (Venstre)	7
Local List(s) (Lokale lister)	6
Total number of members:	29

Gulen heradsstyre 1951–1955
Party name (in Nynorsk)	Number of representatives
Labour Party (Arbeidarpartiet)	8
Farmers' Party (Bondepartiet)	11
Liberal Party (Venstre)	13
Total number of members:	32

Gulen heradsstyre 1947–1951
Party name (in Nynorsk)	Number of representatives
Labour Party (Arbeidarpartiet)	5
Farmers' Party (Bondepartiet)	8
Liberal Party (Venstre)	11
Local List(s) (Lokale lister)	8
Total number of members:	32

Gulen heradsstyre 1945–1947
Party name (in Nynorsk)	Number of representatives
Labour Party (Arbeidarpartiet)	4
Farmers' Party (Bondepartiet)	5
Liberal Party (Venstre)	8
Local List(s) (Lokale lister)	15
Total number of members:	32

Gulen heradsstyre 1937–1941*
Party name (in Nynorsk)	Number of representatives
Labour Party (Arbeidarpartiet)	5
Farmers' Party (Bondepartiet)	6
Liberal Party (Venstre)	9
Local List(s) (Lokale lister)	12
Total number of members:	32
Note: Due to the German occupation of Norway during World War II, no elections were held for new municipal councils until after the war ended in 1945.

=== Mayors ===
The mayor (Nynorsk: ordførar) of Gulen Municipality is the political leader of the municipality and the chairperson of the municipal council. Here is a list of people who have held this position:

- 1838–1849: Rev. Niels Griis Alstrup Dahl
- 1850–1850: Rognald Pederson Haugland
- 1851–1853: Rev. Niels Alstrup
- 1854–1855: Rognald Pederson Haugland
- 1856–1857: Nathanael Sunde Ross
- 1858–1877: Rognald Pederson Haugland
- 1878–1879: Mikal L. Vadsø
- 1880–1881: Otto L. Midthun
- 1882–1885: Mikal L. Vadsø
- 1886–1889: Gjert J. Grinde
- 1890–1910: Anders Hantveit
- 1911–1931: Hans K. Rutledal
- 1932–1941: Henrik H. Tveit
- 1945–1945: Henrik H. Tveit
- 1946–1946: Søren Randal
- 1947–1963: Ludvik J. Kjellevold
- 1964–1967: Søren Randal
- 1968–1971: John L. Kjellevold
- 1971–1975: Harald Takle (V)
- 1976–1978: Ola Byrknes (Sp)
- 1978–1983: Olav Solheim (Ap)
- 1983–1999: Ola Byrknes (Ap)
- 1999–2011: Trude Brosvik (KrF)
- 2011–2023: Hallvard S. Oppedal (Sp)
- 2023–present: May-Lynn Osland (Ap)

== Geography ==
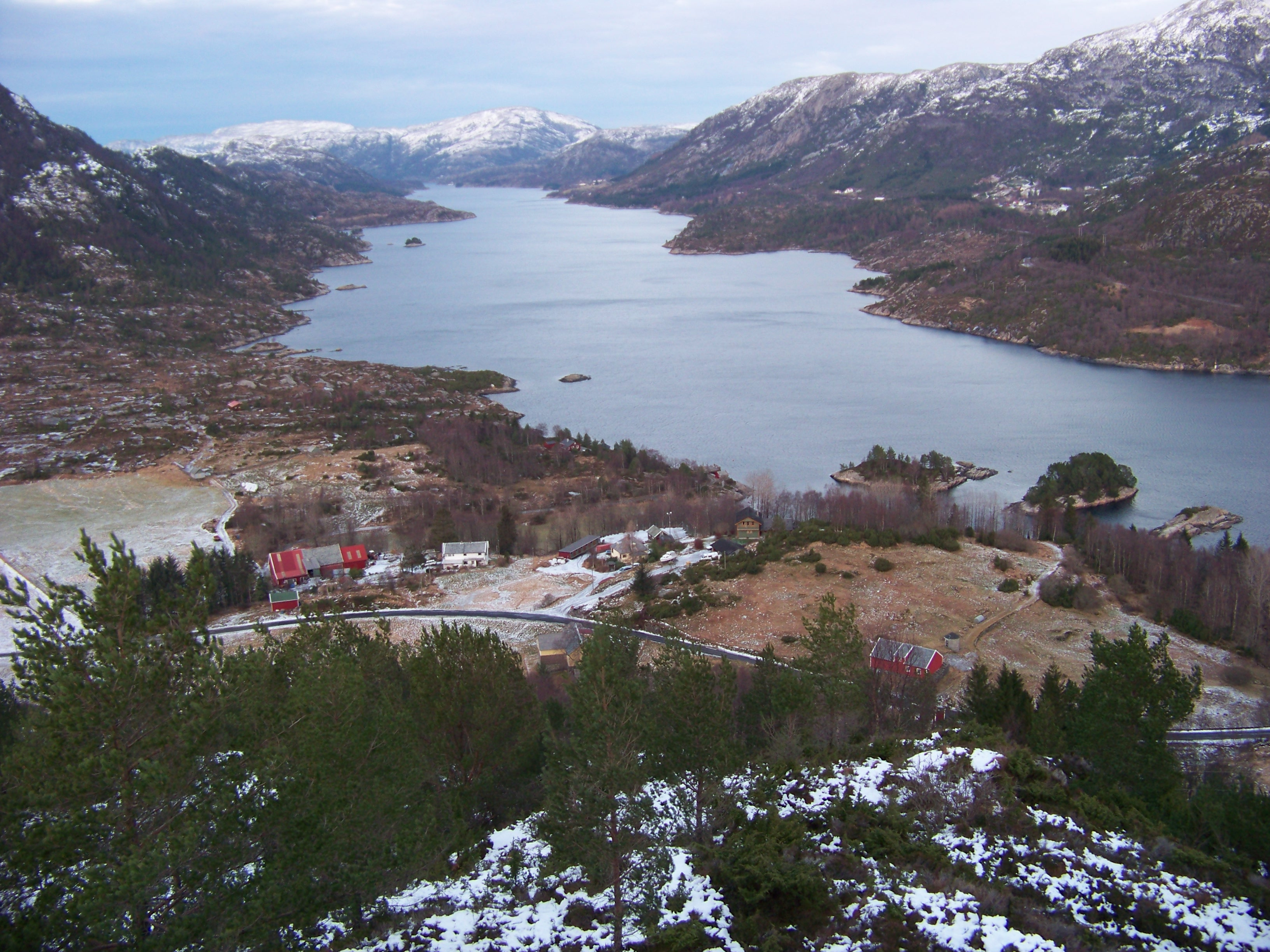
View of the Eidsfjorden

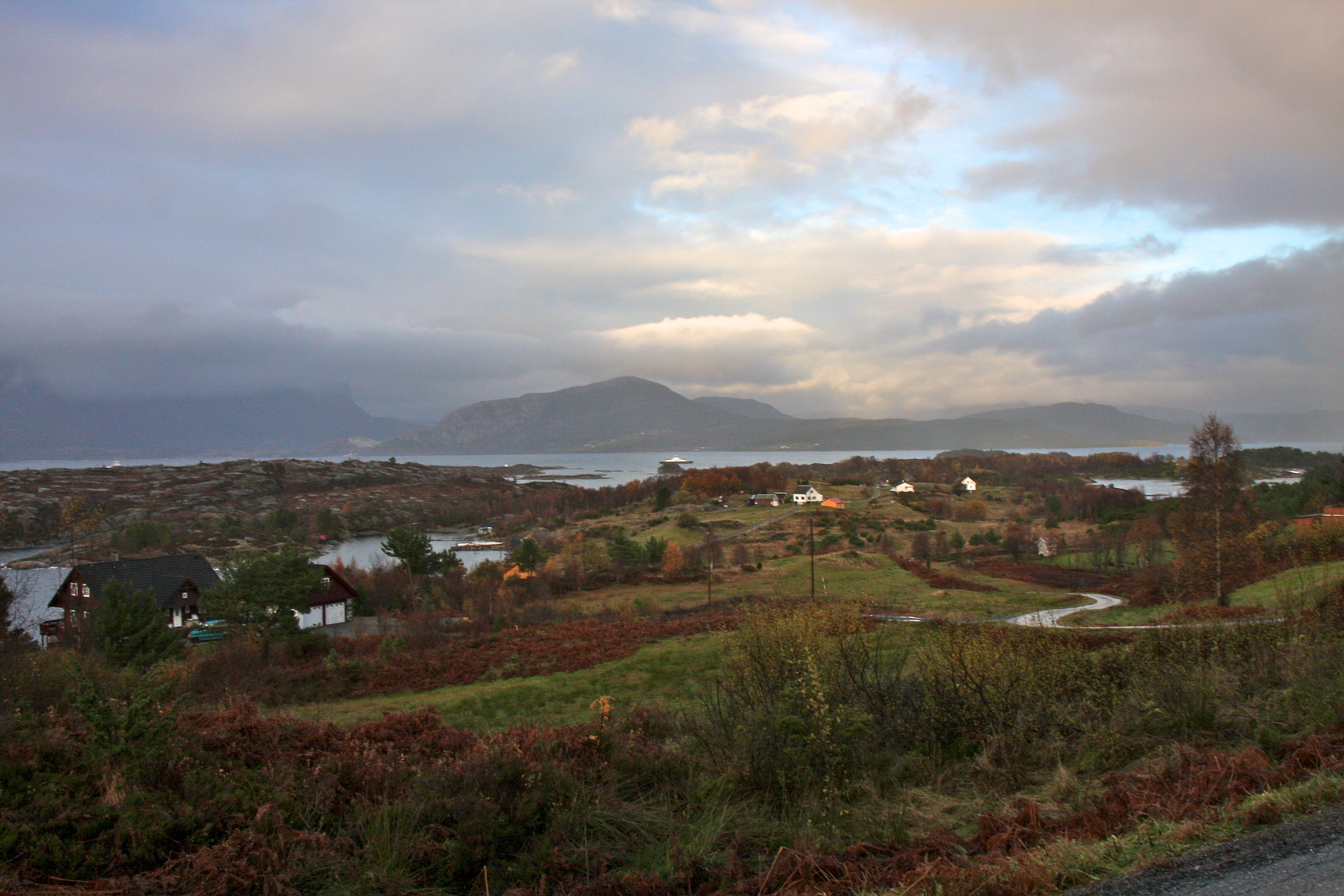
View of the Rutle area in northern Gulen. Credit: Bjarne Thune.

Gulen Municipality has an area of about 600 square kilometres (230 sq mi) including about 1500 small islands, islets, and skerries. The largest of the islands are Byrknesøyna, Hisarøyna, Mjømna, and Sandøyna. The mainland is characterized by small valleys and large mountains crossing the landscape. The lake Dingevatnet is one of Norway's deepest lakes. The highest point in the municipality is the 877.44-metre (2,878.7 ft) tall mountain Svadfjellet, in the southeastern part of the municipality.

Gulen Municipality is bounded on the north by the Sognefjorden and the Sognesjøen, and to the south by the Fensfjorden with the North Sea to the west of the municipality. Gulen Municipality is also bordered by Solund Municipality and Hyllestad Municipality to the north (across the Sognefjorden), by Høyanger Municipality to the east, and by Austrheim Municipality (across the Fensfjorden), Alver Municipality, and Masfjorden Municipality to the south.

The area is a geological region that contains a relatively low nutrition content ground, which characterizes the types of flora. The moors, which are frequently covered with wild purple heather, are the dominating picture of the area. Due to the large quantity of rain in the area, there are many types of moss and lichen in Gulen Municipality. Most of the land in Gulen is very mountainous and inhospitable.

Land use in Gulen
Land type	Percent
Agricultural	4%
Forest	19%
Water	3%
Other	74%

== Climate ==
Gulen has a temperate oceanic climate (Cfb in the Köppen climate classification), also known as a marine west coast climate. Gulen Municipality is among the wettest areas of Norway, with almost 3,000 millimetres (120 in) of annual precipitaiton, and on average 202 days annually with precipitation. It comes mainly as rain in low-elevation areas, but mountains can pack on a lot of snow during the winter. Wettest season is autumn and winter, and December the wettest month. The average date for the last overnight freeze (low below 0 °C (32.0 °F)) in spring is 19 April and average date for first freeze in autumn is 31 October giving a frost-free season of 194 days (1981-2010 average). The Takle weather station started recording in June 1950.

Climate data for Takle 1991–2020 (38 m)
Month	Jan	Feb	Mar	Apr	May	Jun	Jul	Aug	Sep	Oct	Nov	Dec	Year
Mean daily maximum °C (°F)	4.4 (39.9)	3.9 (39.0)	5.5 (41.9)	9.1 (48.4)	12.9 (55.2)	16.1 (61.0)	18.1 (64.6)	17.7 (63.9)	14.6 (58.3)	10.3 (50.5)	7 (45)	4.9 (40.8)	10.4 (50.7)
Daily mean °C (°F)	2.2 (36.0)	1.7 (35.1)	3 (37)	5.7 (42.3)	9.3 (48.7)	12.5 (54.5)	14.6 (58.3)	14.4 (57.9)	11.7 (53.1)	7.8 (46.0)	4.8 (40.6)	2.8 (37.0)	7.5 (45.5)
Mean daily minimum °C (°F)	0.2 (32.4)	−0.3 (31.5)	0.6 (33.1)	2.9 (37.2)	5.8 (42.4)	9.3 (48.7)	11.7 (53.1)	11.6 (52.9)	9.2 (48.6)	5.4 (41.7)	2.7 (36.9)	0.8 (33.4)	5.0 (41.0)
Average precipitation mm (inches)	351 (13.8)	285 (11.2)	261 (10.3)	170 (6.7)	137 (5.4)	129 (5.1)	148 (5.8)	190 (7.5)	269 (10.6)	313 (12.3)	336 (13.2)	370 (14.6)	2,959 (116.5)
Average precipitation days (≥ 1.0 mm)	20	17	18	14	14	13	15	17	17	18	19	20	202
Source 1: yr.no/Met.no
Source 2: Noaa WMO averages 91-2020 Norway

== Economy ==
Historically, Gulen's economy has been centered around farming and fishing. More recently, Gulen has become important because of its close proximity to the Mongstad industrial area which includes many oil refineries operated by Statoil, Shell Oil, and other oil companies. Other factories and industries in Gulen include Wergeland-Halsvik, Baker Oil Tools, Johnny Birkeland Transport, and Vest Tank. There are many other small businesses located in Gulen today.

== Attractions ==
=== Tusenårsstedet Gulatinget ===
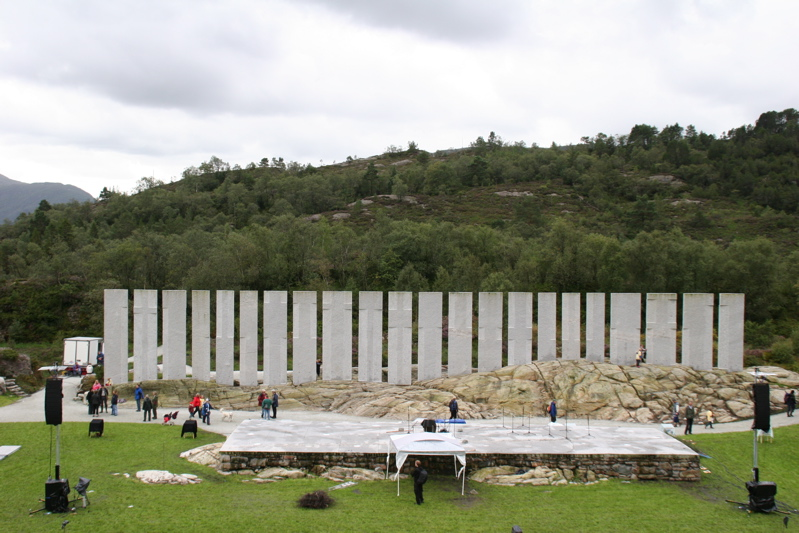
Tusenårsstedet Gulatinget

The Gulating was a legislative assembly which met regularly for a period of at least five hundred years in Gulen on the shores of the Gulafjorden. In 1300, the assembly was moved to Bergen. The members of the assembly represented the farmers of Western Norway. This was where important political issues were discussed and decisions were made. The old assembly was also used as a law court for both civil and criminal cases. The Gulating was thus related to the representative institutions of today such as the municipal council and the Norwegian Parliament, Storting.

A sculpture park was built in Flolid in Gulen in order to commemorate the Gulating legislative assembly. Norwegian sculptor Bård Breivik was responsible for the artistic elements which were opened by the public during August 2005. The park is a work of art in its own right that is used as the setting for outdoor dance and musical performances in beautiful and unique natural surroundings.

=== Sellevåg Wooden Shoe Factory ===
Wooden shoes were produced in Sellevåg from 1899 to 1975. The factory was powered by water in the Sellevåg Lake. The wooden shoe factory is still there with all its production equipment intact. A guided tour with demonstration can be arranged on request.

=== Trondheim Post-Road ===
The historic mail route from Bergen and Trondheim, The post-road goes through Fjaler Municipality, Hyllestad Municipality and Gulen Municipality. Built between 1801 and 1806, it passes over many beautiful stone bridges.

== Notable people ==
- Peder Furubotn (1890 in Brekke – 1975), cabinetmaker, politician, and resistance member
- Ole Elias Holck (1774 in Hyllestad – 1842), Norwegian military officer and representative at the Norwegian Constitutional Assembly
- Fredrik Lange-Nielsen (1891 in Eivindvik – 1980), mathematician and insurance company manager
