= Mjømna Church =

Church in Vestland, Norway

- Mjømna kyrkje
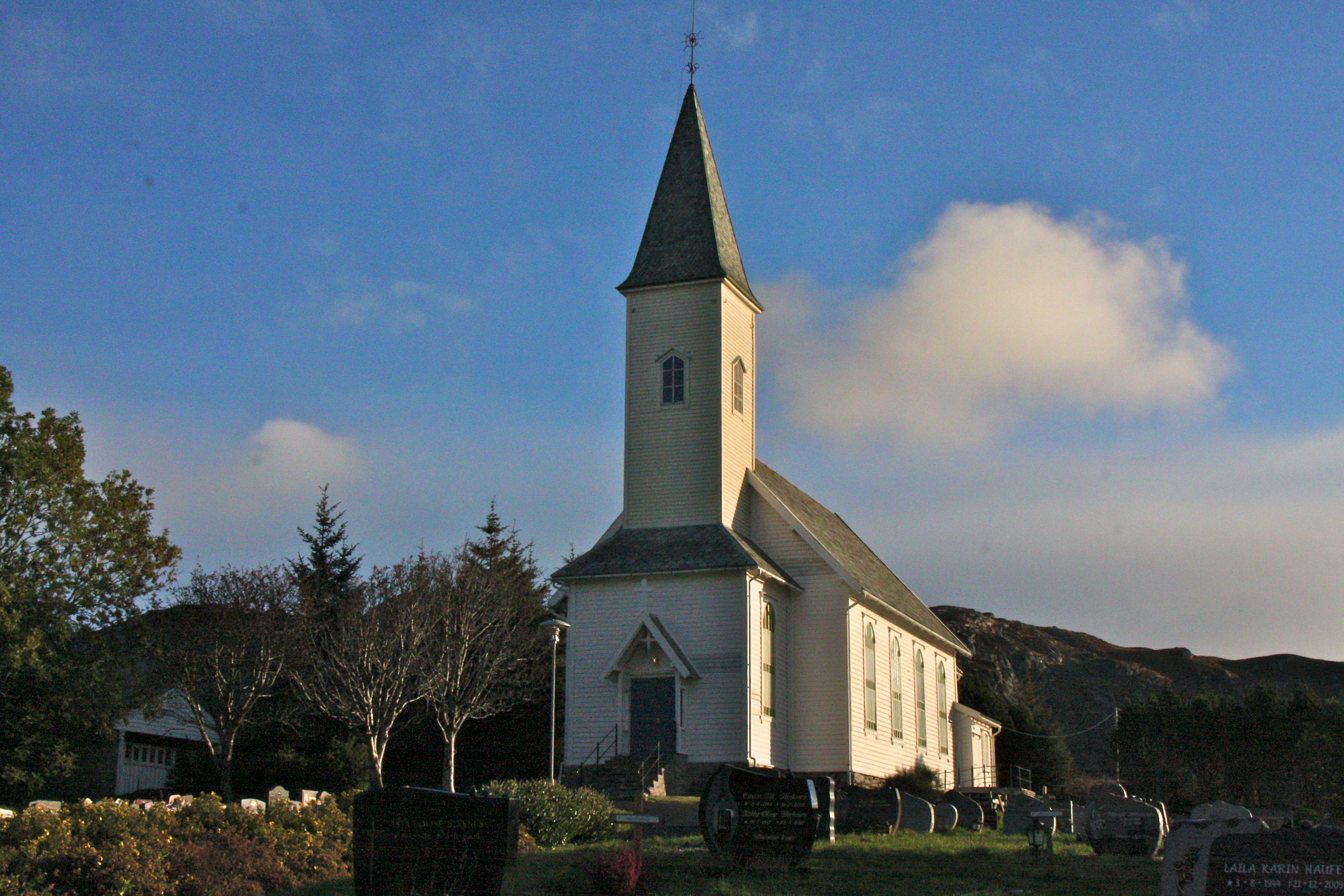
- View of the church Credit: Bjarne Thune
- Mjømna Church
- 60°55′19″N 4°54′03″E
- Location: Gulen Municipality, Vestland
- Country: Norway
- Denomination: Church of Norway
- Churchmanship: Evangelical Lutheran

History
- Status: Parish church
- Founded: 1901
- Consecrated: 5 November 1901

Architecture
- Functional status: Active
- Architect: Anders Korsvold
- Architectural type: Long church
- Completed: 1901 (125 years ago)

Specifications
- Capacity: 310
- Materials: Wood

Administration
- Diocese: Bjørgvin bispedømme
- Deanery: Nordhordland prosti
- Parish: Mjømna
- Norwegian Cultural Heritage Site
- Type: Church
- Status: Not protected
- ID: 84953

Mjømna Church (Norwegian: Mjømna kyrkje) is a parish church of the Church of Norway in Gulen Municipality in Vestland county, Norway. It is located in the village of Mjømna on the island of Mjømna. It is the church for the Mjømna parish which is part of the Nordhordland prosti (deanery) in the Diocese of Bjørgvin. The white, wooden church was built in a long church design in 1901 using plans drawn up by the architect and head builder Anders Korsvold from Gulen. The church seats about 310 people.

== History ==
The new parish of Mjømna was established by Royal Decree of 23 June 1900, separating from the main parish of Gulen. This happened after many years of demands for a new church by the people living in the island region of Gulen. Those residents had a long journey to Gulen Church and they strongly desired a church closer to them. The church was consecrated on 5 November 1901 by the Bishop Johan Willoch Erichsen. In 1973, a small addition was built containing a bathroom and storage area.

== Media gallery ==
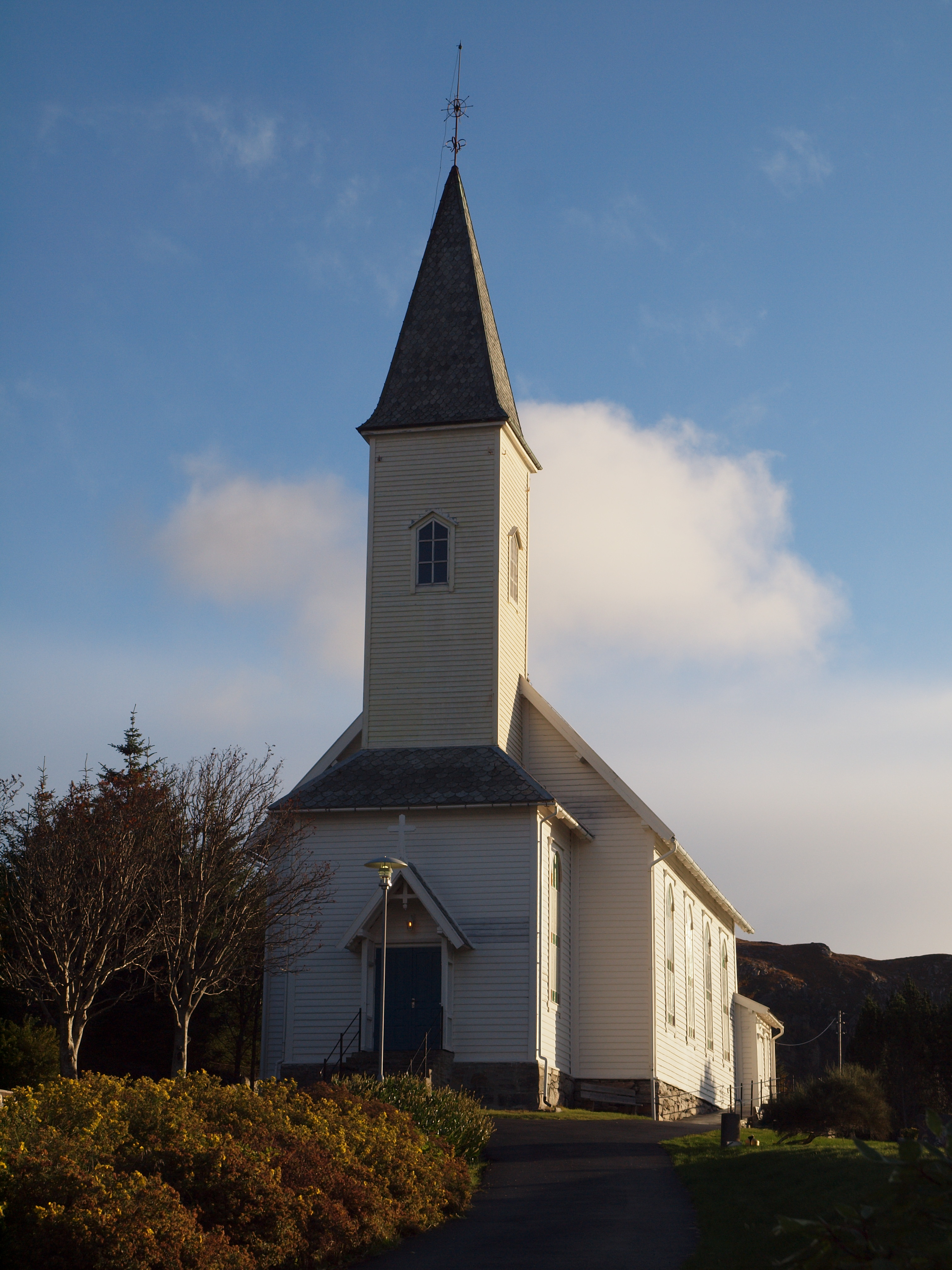

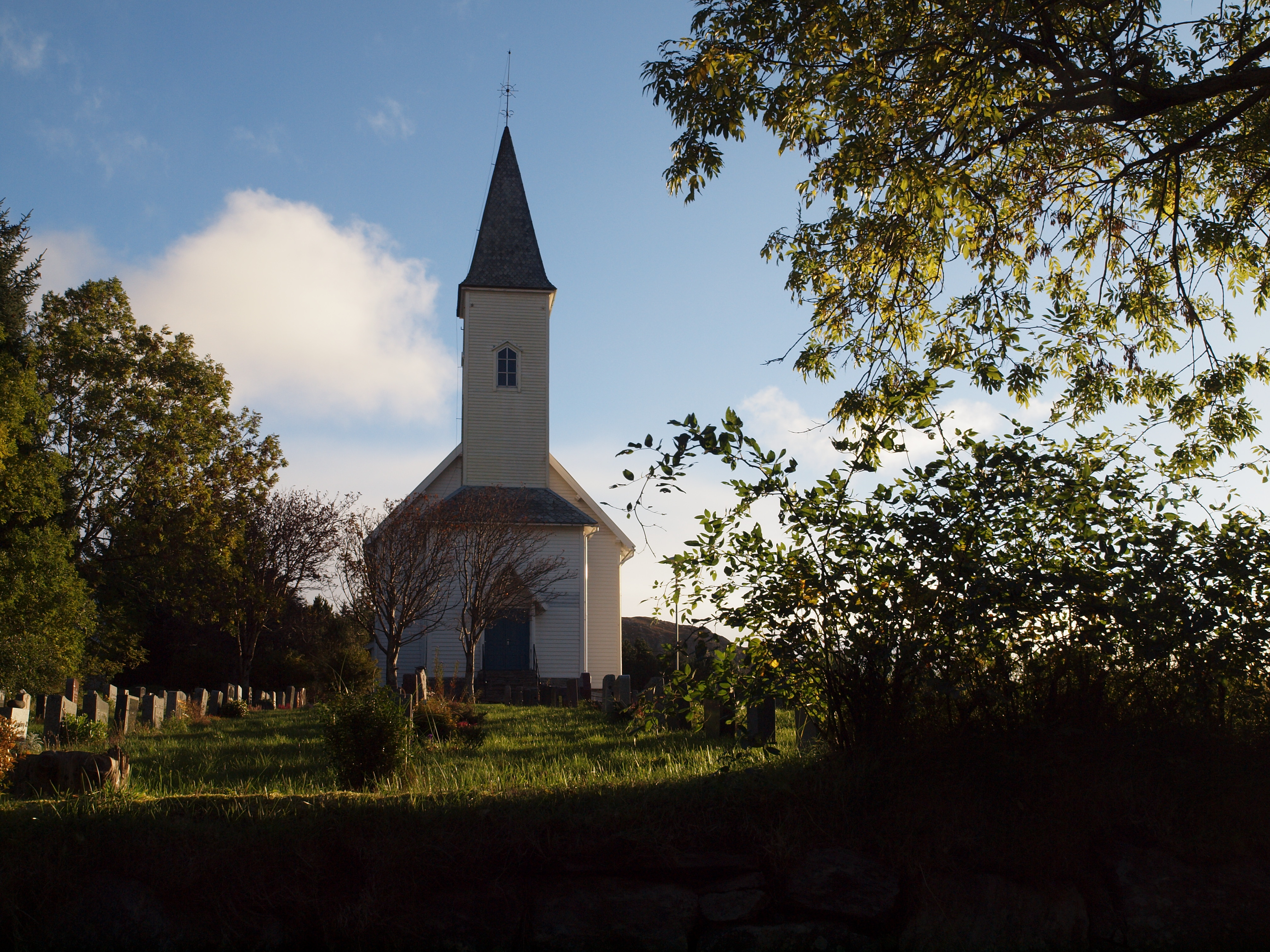

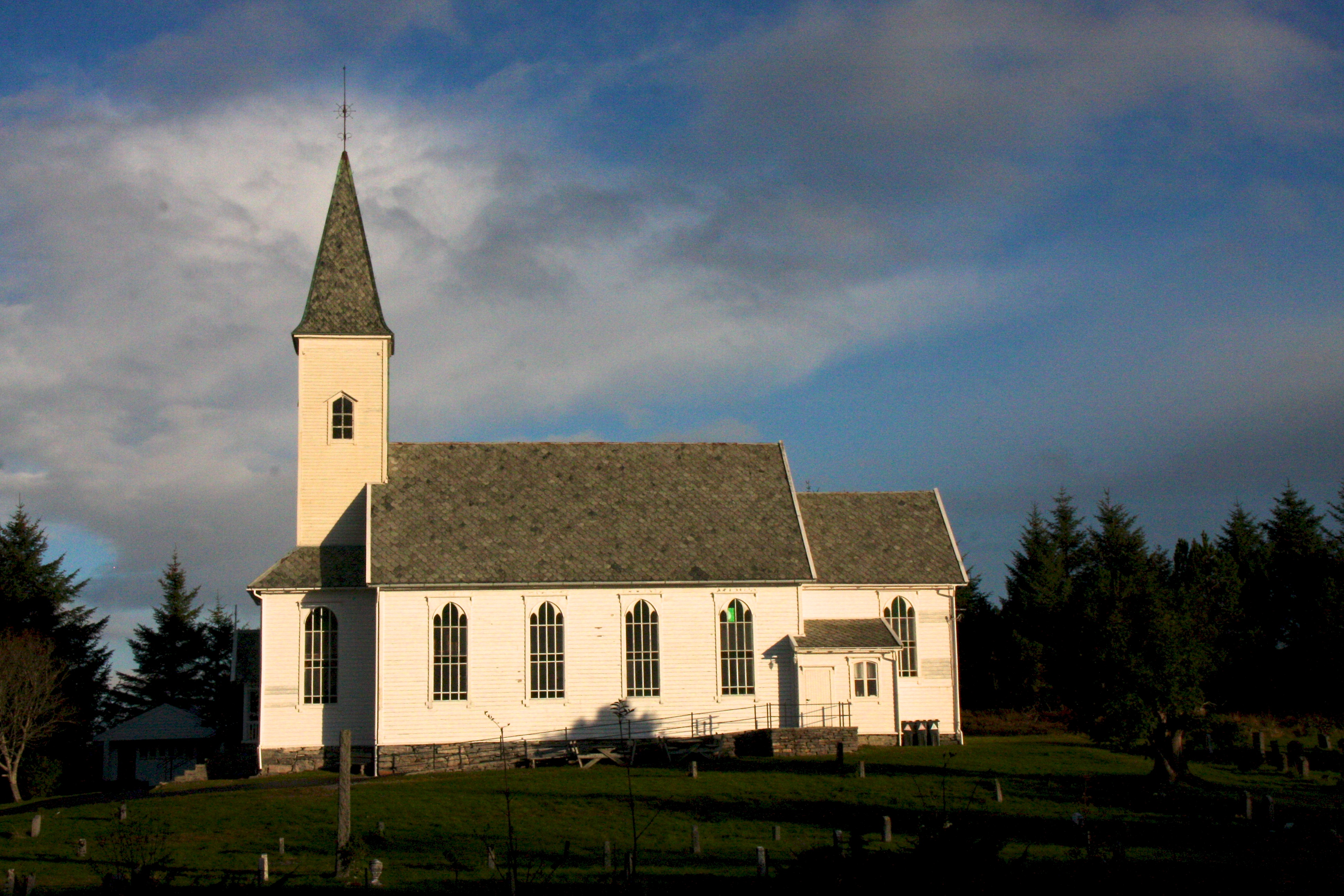

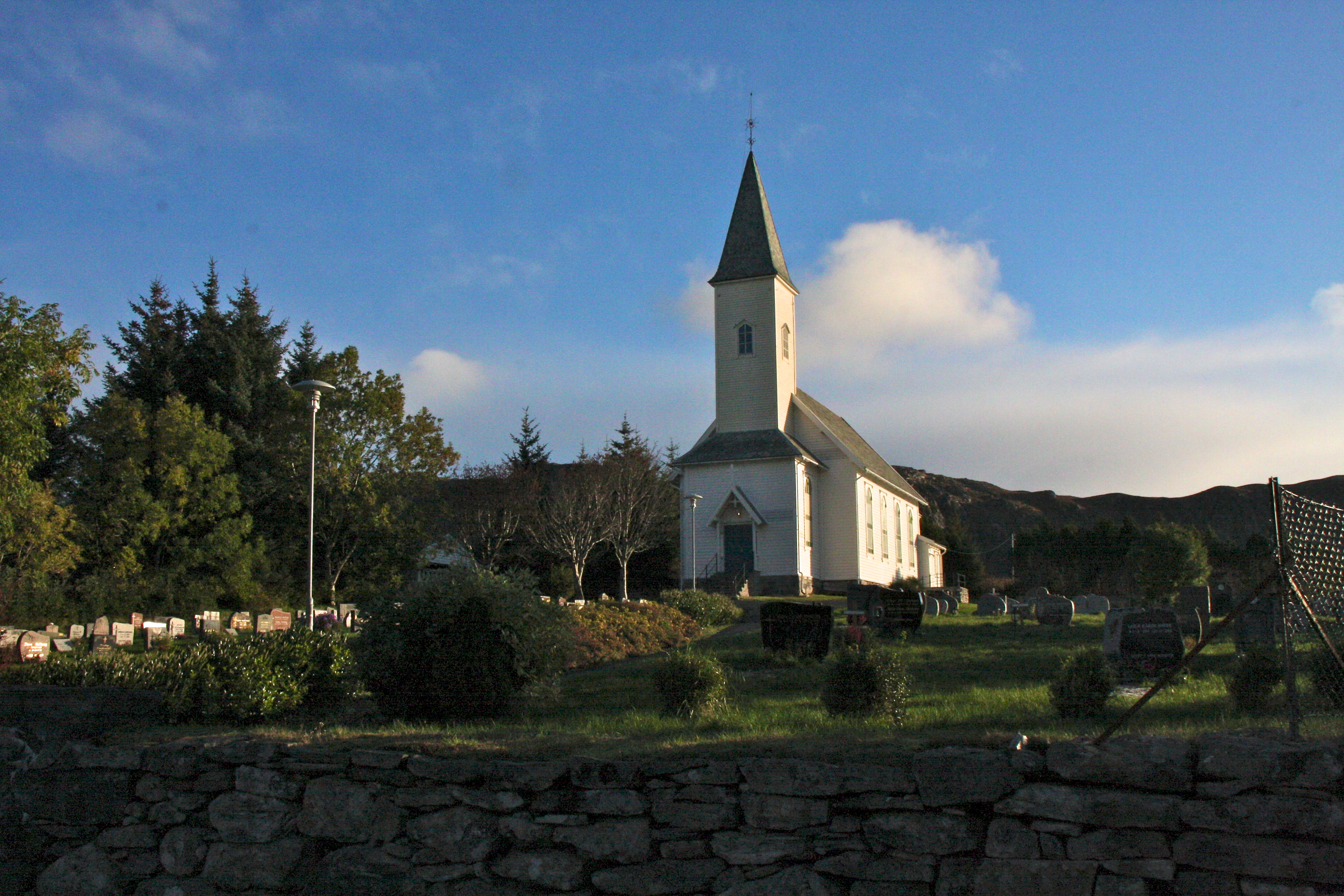

== See also ==
- List of churches in Bjørgvin
