= Hisarøyna =

Island in Vestland, Norway

Hisarøyna Hiserøyna
- Interactive map of Hisarøyna; Hiserøyna

Geography
- Location: Vestland, Norway
- Coordinates: 60.9862°N 4.9732°E
- Area: 18.7 km^{2} (7.2 sq mi)
- Length: 4.7 km (2.92 mi)
- Width: 5.4 km (3.36 mi)
- Highest elevation: 313 m (1027 ft)
- Highest point: Veten

Administration
- Norway
- County: Vestland
- Municipality: Gulen Municipality

Demographics
- Population: 43 (2001)

Hisarøyna is an island in Gulen Municipality in Vestland county, Norway. The 18.7-square-kilometre (7.2 sq mi) island lies about 600 metres (2,000 ft) west of the mainland, and about 2.5 kilometres (1.6 mi) west of the village of Eivindvik, the municipal centre of Gulen Municipality. The island is located south of the Sognesjøen and north of the Gulafjorden. In 2001, there were 43 residents living on the island.

== History ==
The coastline is rocky and has several fjords which cut into the island. The southeast part of the island is dominated by the 313-metre (1,027 ft) tall mountain Veten, while the rest of the island is relatively flat with some marshy lowland areas. Most of the island is unsuitable for habitation. The island's inhabitants live in just a few farm areas: Nyhammaren (on the east coast), Stemnebø and Vilsvika (on the south coast), Hjartås (central part of the island, along a fjord), and Straume (on the northern coast).

== Transport ==
In September 2013, a cable ferry connection was opened connecting Hisarøyna to the mainland. The regular ferry route takes about 8 minutes to cross the strait. This is the first regular connection to the island. It will carry up to 6 automobiles or one large truck.

== See also ==
- List of islands of Norway
