= Oluf Holck =

Norwegian politician

Oluf Holck (11 December 1858 – 10 August 1938) was a Norwegian politician for the Liberal, Labour and Social Democratic Labour parties.

He was born in Bergen and moved to Bærum Municipality in 1884. He worked for seventeen years at Høvik Glassverk before starting his own tinsmith company where he worked until his death.

He was elected to the municipal council of Bærum Municipality in 1898, and served as a councilman until 1925, except for the period 1904 to 1907 when he worked in Ålesund. He represented the Liberal Party until 1903, when Eastern Bærum Labour Party was established. Upon retiring from local politics in 1925, he was a member of the financial council, regulatory commission, the electoral committee, the cinema board and the board of Strand Restaurant in addition to councilman.

Holck stood for parliamentary election for the Labour Party twice, both times with Christian Fredrik Michelet as his main opponent. In 1912 he lost in the first round with 2,274 votes against 2,912. A second round of voting was therefore held. Here, he lost with 3,037 to 3,460 votes. He carried the tiny sub-constituency Son as well as Nesodden Municipality, and was very close to carrying Bærum, with 1,683 against 1,688 votes. In 1915 he carried Son and Oppegaard Municipality, but lost greatly among others in Bærum, with Michelet tallying 4,776 votes, Holck's 3,491 was not enough to even secure a second round.

In 1921 Holck joined the Social Democratic Labour Party. In the first and only general election contested by this party, in 1924, Holck was the ninth candidate on the Akershus ballot headed by Harald Halvorsen.
