= Eivindvik =

Village in Gulen Municipality, Norway

- Village
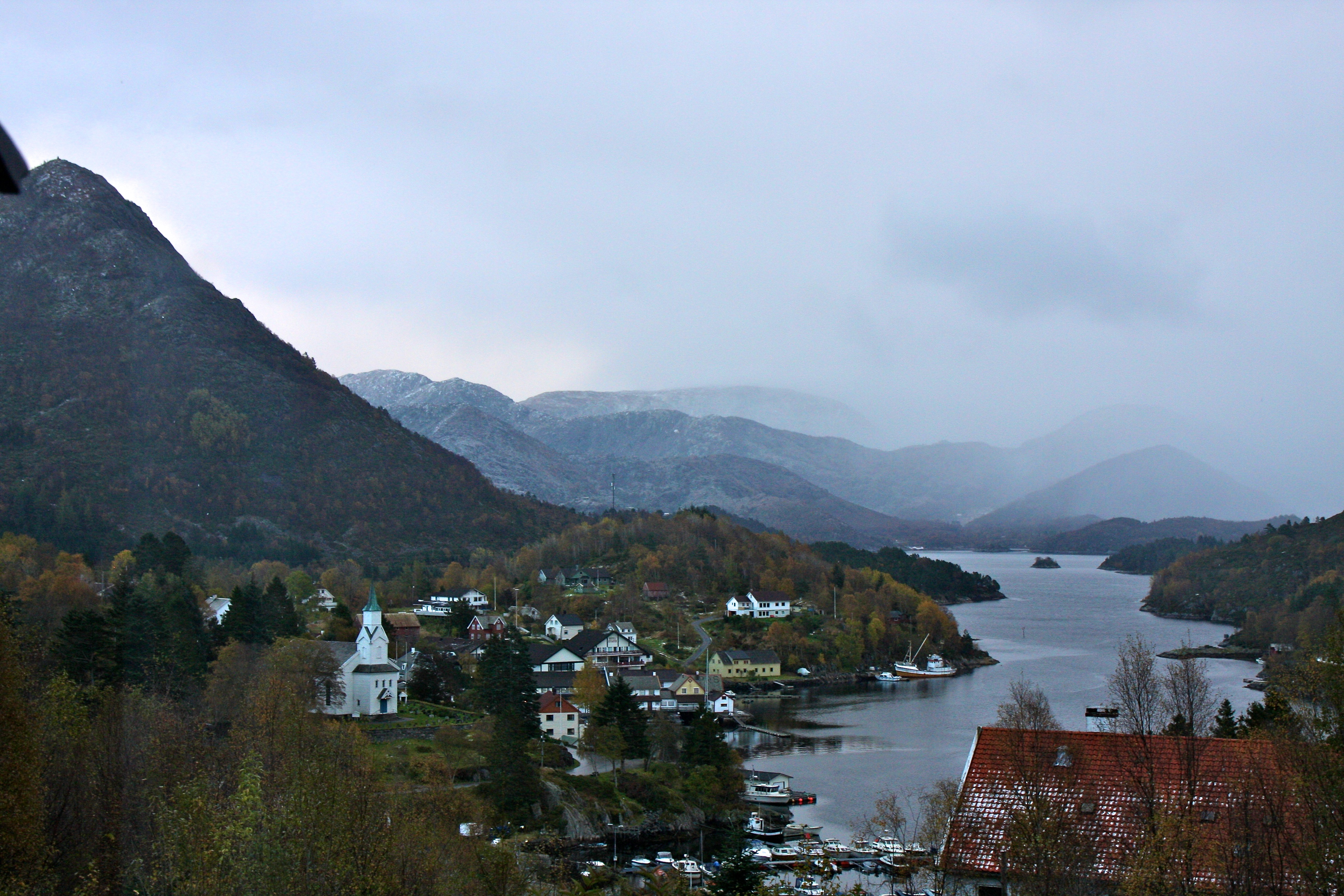
- View of Eivindvik, including Gulen Church and the Gulafjorden
- Interactive map of Eivindvik
- Location within Vestland Location within Norway
- Coordinates: 60.98136°N 5.07497°E
- Country: Norway
- Region: Western Norway
- County: Vestland
- District: Sogn
- Municipality: Gulen Municipality

Area
  - Total: 0.4 km^{2} (0.15 sq mi)
- Elevation: 5 m (16 ft)

Population (2025)
  - Total: 336
  - Density: 840/km^{2} (2,200/sq mi)
- Time zone: UTC+01:00 (CET)
  - Summer (DST): UTC+02:00 (CEST)
- Post Code: 5966 Eivindvik

Eivindvik is the administrative centre of Gulen Municipality in Vestland county, Norway. The village is located on the mainland, along the north shore of the Gulafjorden. It is also located about 5 kilometres (3.1 mi) south of the village of Dingja (and the lake Dingevatnet), about 6 kilometres (3.7 mi) northwest of the village of Dalsøyra, and about 15 kilometres (9.3 mi) northeast of the village of Byrknes.

Eivindvik is the commercial centre of the municipality as well as the seat of government for the municipality. Gulen Church has been located in Eivindvik for centuries. The 0.4-square-kilometre (99-acre) village has a population (2025) of 336 and a population density of 840 inhabitants per square kilometre (2,200/sq mi).

== History ==
This area has an ancient history, since the Gulating met in this area in the years 900—1300, creating laws which governed most of Western Norway.

=== Name ===
Gulen Municipality was originally named after this village (Evindvig Municipality). There have been many spelling variations throughout the past few centuries: Evindvig, Evenvig, or Evenvik. The name of the municipality was officially changed to Gulen Municipality on 1 July 1890, but the village name remained as Eivindvik (using the modern Norwegian spelling).

== Media gallery ==
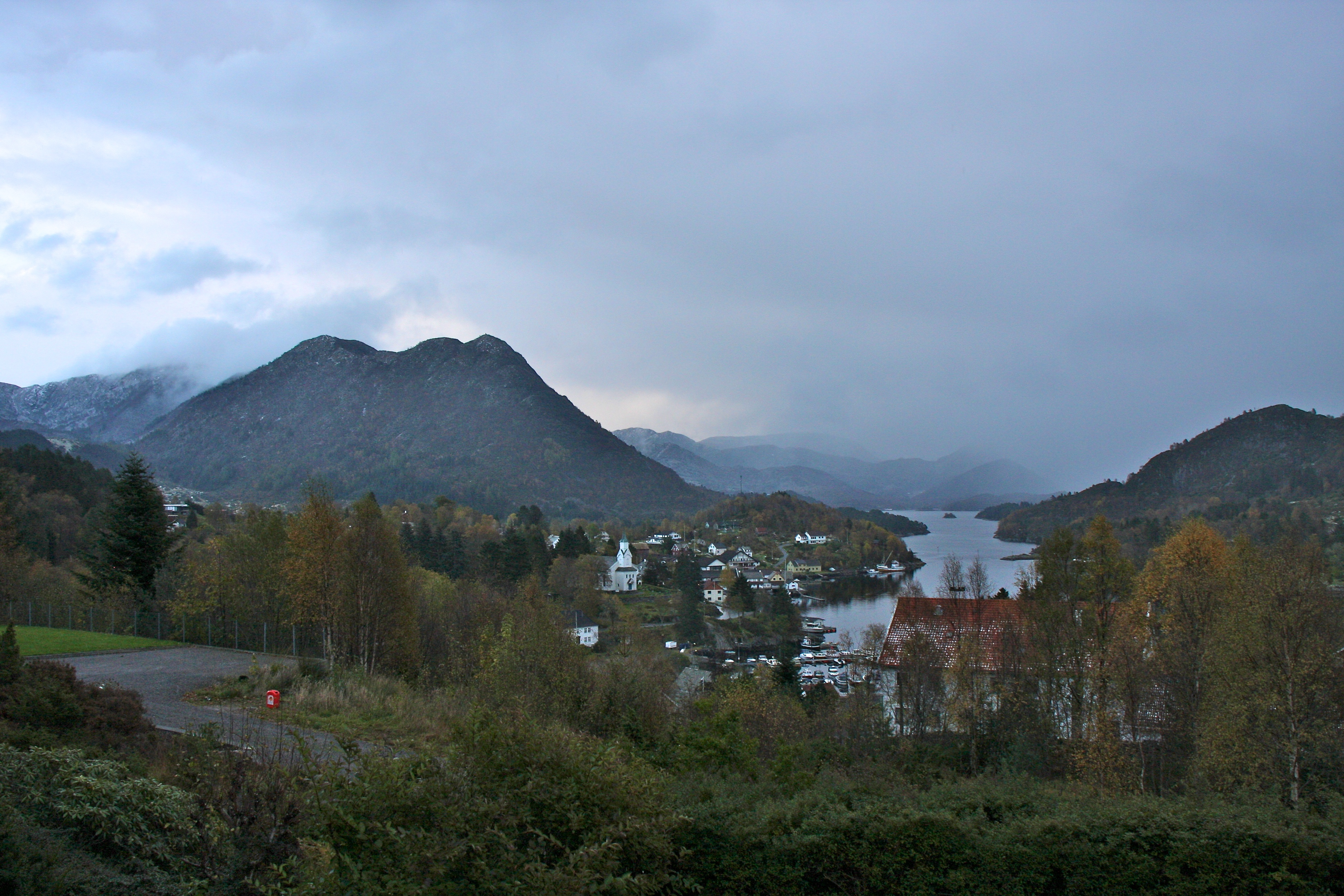
View of Eivindvik, looking east
Credit: Bjarne Thune

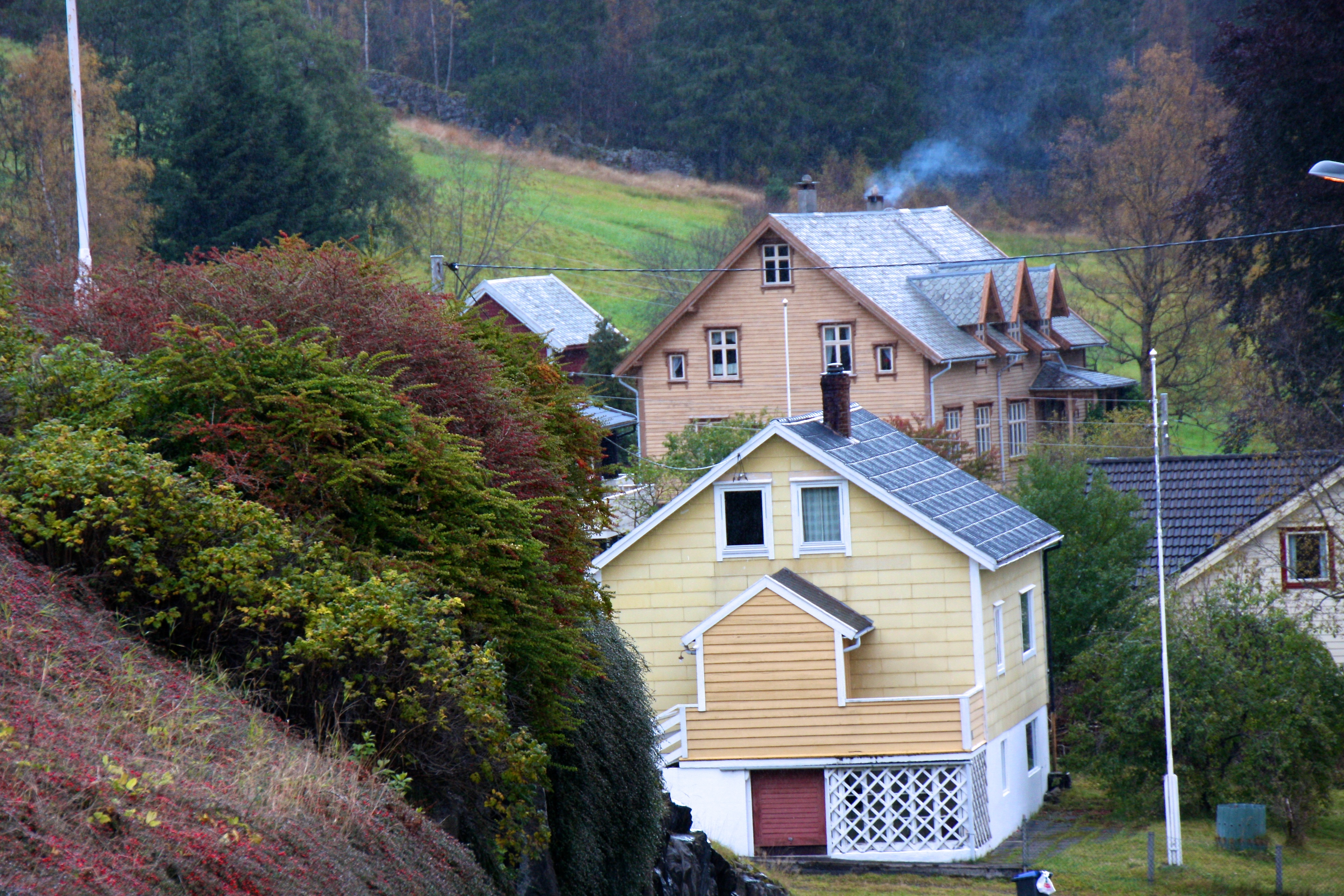
View of some houses in Eivindvik
Credit: Bjarne Thune

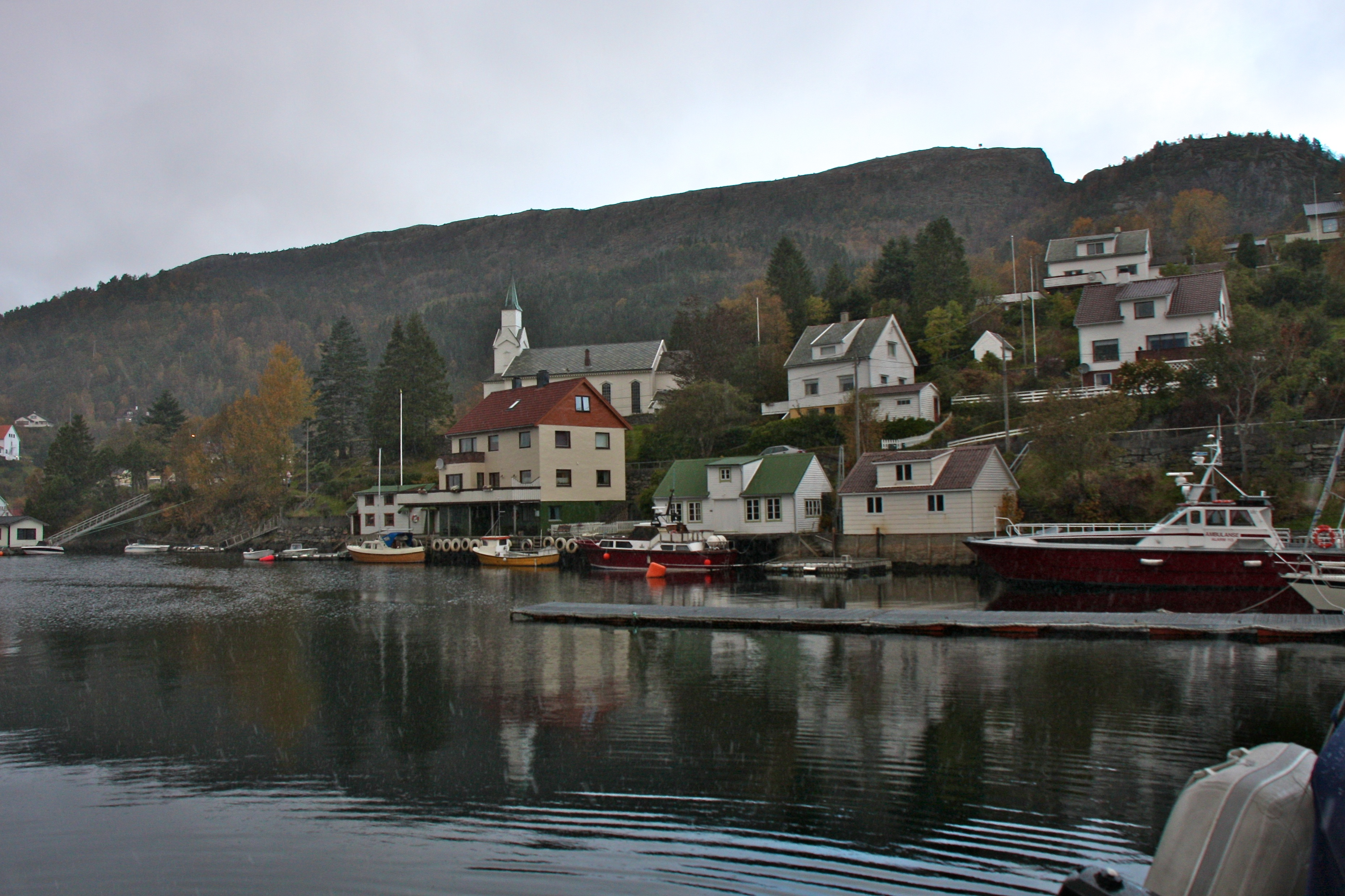
View of the church in Eivindvik
Credit: Bjarne Thune

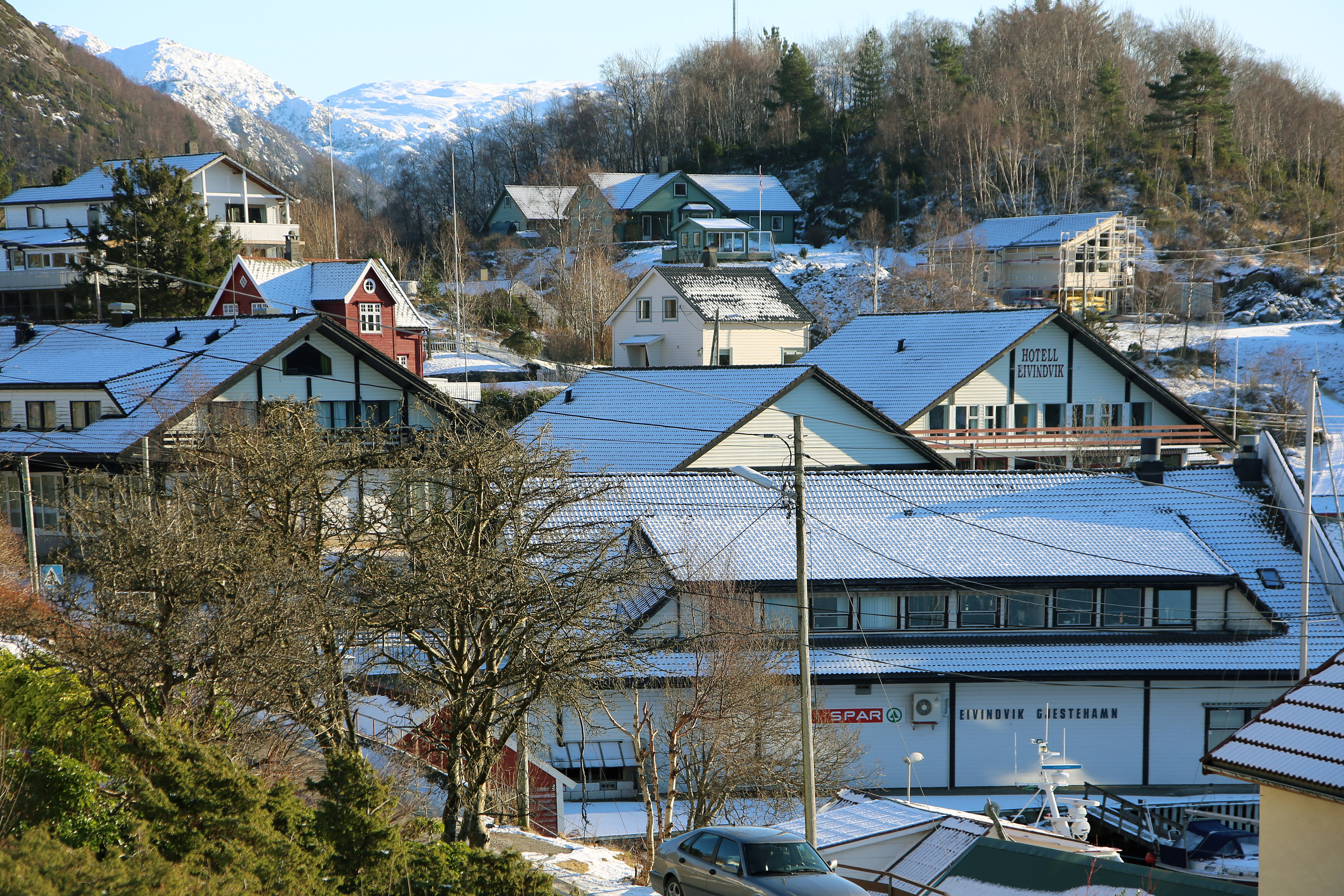
Commercial centre of Eivindvik
Credit: Nina Aldin Thune

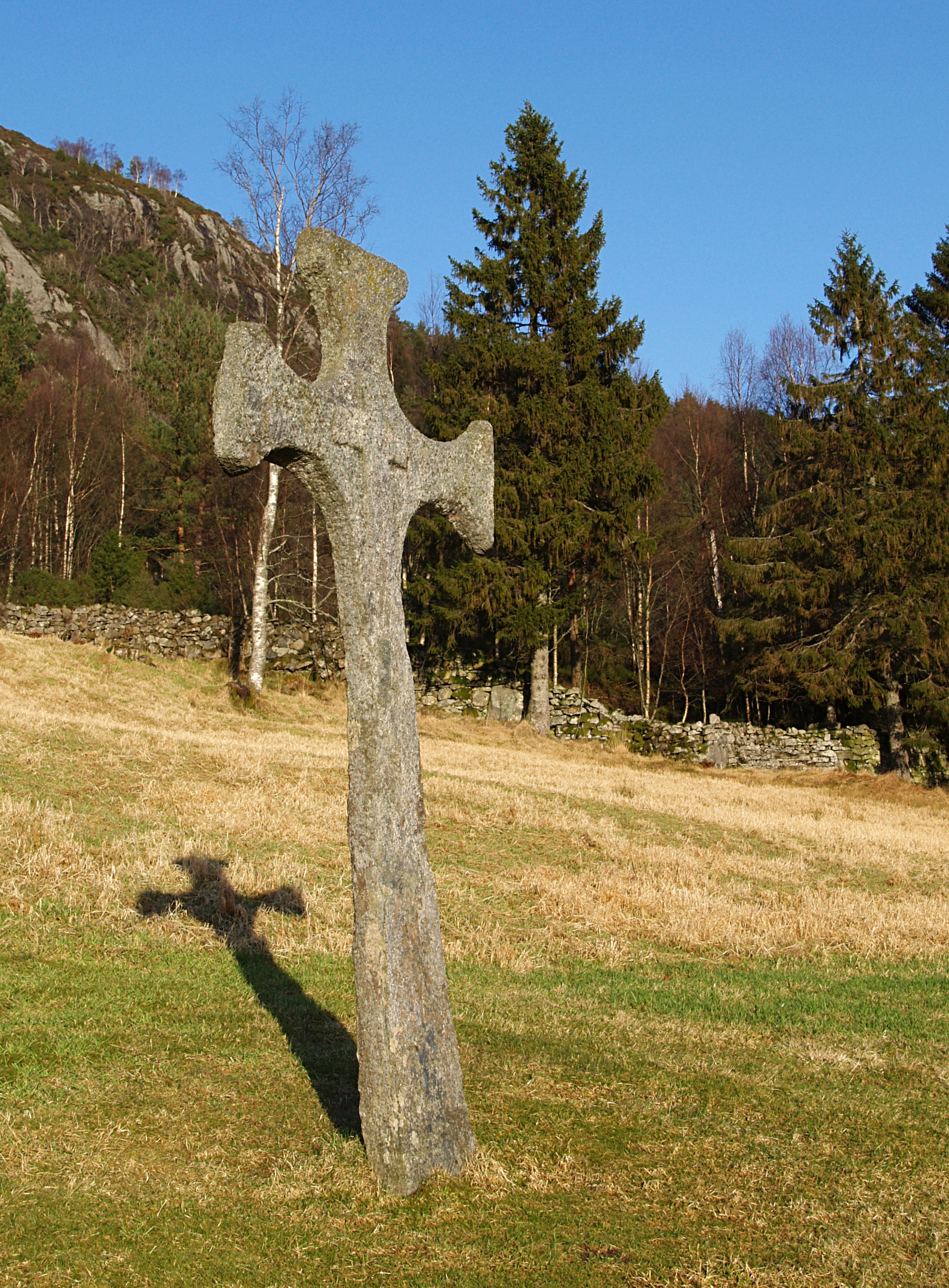
Ancient stone cross near Eivindvik
Credit: John Erling Blad
