= Høyanger Municipality =

Municipality in Vestland, Norway

Høyanger Municipality Høyanger kommune
- Municipality
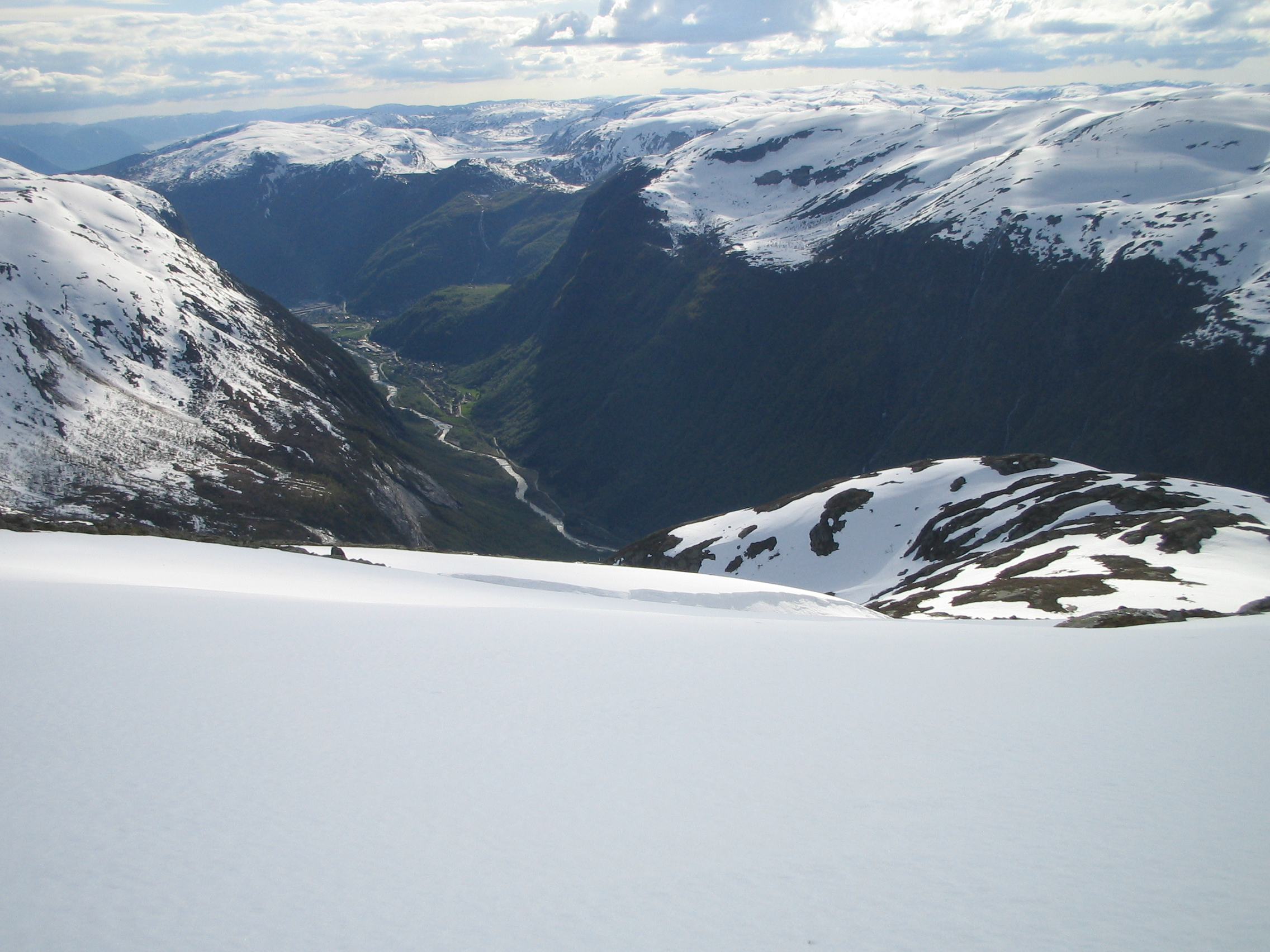
- View of the Høyanger valley from the mountain Havren

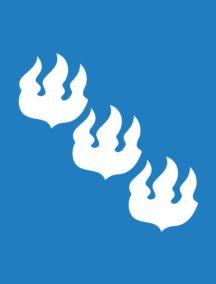
- Flag Coat of arms

- Vestland within Norway

- Høyanger within Vestland
- Coordinates: 61°11′17″N 05°53′44″E
- Country: Norway
- County: Vestland
- District: Sogn
- Established: 1 Jan 1964
  - Preceded by: Kyrkjebø Municipality and Lavik Municipality
- Administrative centre: Høyanger

Government
  - Mayor (2011): Petter Sortland (Ap)

Area
  - Total: 1,000.92 km^{2} (386.46 sq mi)
  - Land: 927.62 km^{2} (358.16 sq mi)
  - Water: 73.30 km^{2} (28.30 sq mi) 7.3%
  - Rank: #115 in Norway
- Highest elevation: 1,455.53 m (4,775.4 ft)

Population (2025)
  - Total: 3,894
  - Rank: #208 in Norway
  - Density: 3.9/km^{2} (10/sq mi)
  - Change (10 years): ▼ −7.3%
- Demonym: Høyangring

Official language
  - Norwegian form: Nynorsk
- Time zone: UTC+01:00 (CET)
  - Summer (DST): UTC+02:00 (CEST)
- ISO 3166 code: NO-4638
- Website: Official website

Høyanger (Norwegian: [ˈhœ̂ʏɑŋər]) is a municipality in Vestland county, Norway. It is located in the traditional district of Sogn. The administrative center is the village of Høyanger. Other villages in Høyanger Municipality include Austreim, Bjordal, Kyrkjebø, Lavik, Ortnevik, and Vadheim.

Høyanger Municipality is known for having one of the first industrial villages in Norway to use its steep mountains surrounding the village giving excellent conditions for producing hydroelectricity needed for electrolysis. The main product being produced in the village of Høyanger was aluminium.

The 1,001-square-kilometre (386 sq mi) municipality is the 115th largest by area out of the 357 municipalities in Norway. Høyanger Municipality is the 208th most populous municipality in Norway with a population of 3,894. The municipality's population density is 3.9 inhabitants per square kilometre (10/sq mi) and its population has decreased by 7.3% over the previous 10-year period.

== General information ==
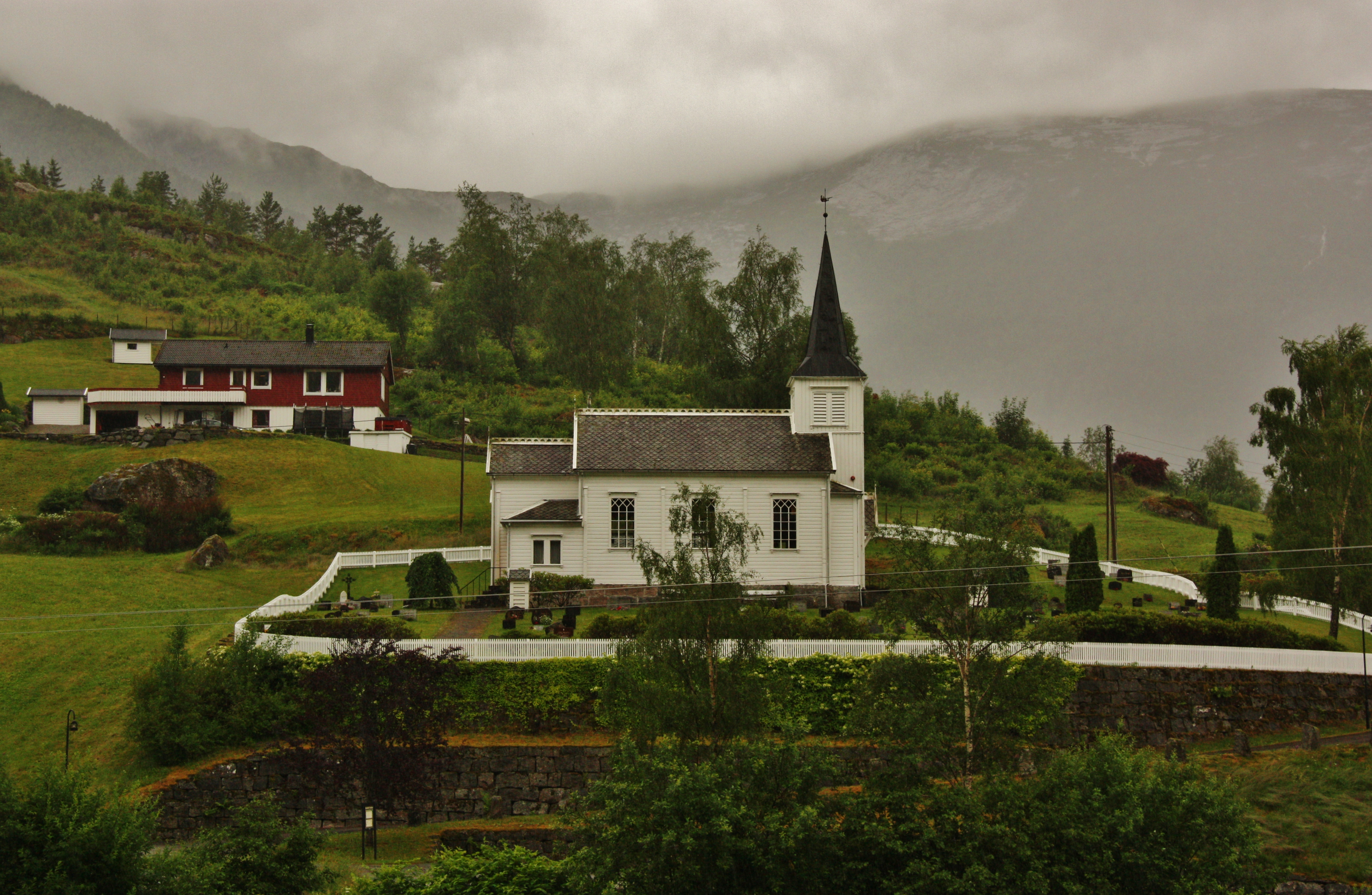
View of Bjordal Church

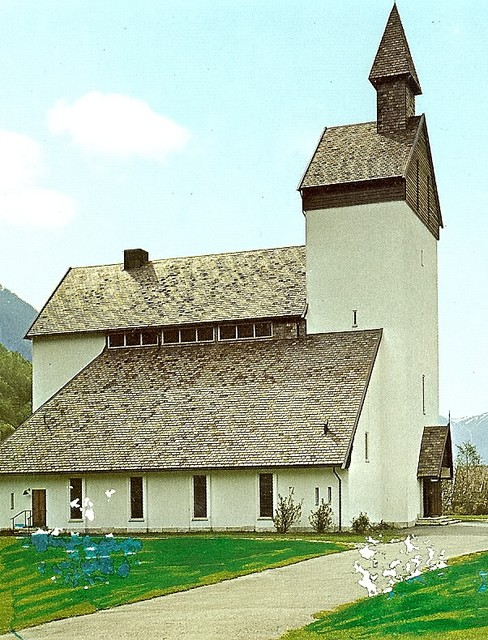
View of Høyanger Church

During the 1960s, there were many municipal mergers across Norway due to the work of the Schei Committee. Høyanger Municipality was created on 1 January 1964 when the following areas were merged:

- all of Kyrkjebø Municipality (population: 4,742)
- all of Lavik Municipality (population: 782)
- the unpopulated Nybø and Nygjerdet areas of Vik Municipality

Historically, this municipality was part of the old Sogn og Fjordane county. On 1 January 2020, the municipality became a part of the newly-formed Vestland county (after Hordaland and Sogn og Fjordane counties were merged). Also on 1 January 2020, the Nessane area of neighboring Balestrand Municipality was merged into Høyanger Municipality (while the rest of Balestrand Municipality was merged into a new, larger Sogndal Municipality).

=== Name ===
The municipality is named Høyanger (Old Norse: Høyjangr) after the old name of an arm of the Sognefjorden that is now called the Høyangsfjorden. The first element is derived from the word hey which means "hay". The last element is angr which means "bay" or "inlet". Thus the name is probably referring to the green hillsides along the fjord.

=== Coat of arms ===
The coat of arms was granted on 15 May 1987. The official blazon is "Azure, three flames in bend argent" (Norwegian: På blå grunn tre sølv flammer i skrå rekkje). This means the arms have a blue field (background) and the charge is a set of three flames lined up diagonally. The charge has a tincture of argent which means it is commonly colored white, but if it is made out of metal, then silver is used. The flames were chosen as a symbol for the local aluminium industry. Aluminium is melted and purified in the village of Høyanger, due to the cheap hydroelectric energy that is locally available. The colors represent waterpower (blue) and aluminium (silver). The arms were designed by Inge Rotevatn. The municipal flag has the same design as the coat of arms.

=== Churches ===
The Church of Norway has four parishes(sokn) within Høyanger Municipality. It is part of the Sunnfjord prosti (deanery) in the Diocese of Bjørgvin.

Churches in Høyanger Municipality
Parish (sokn)	Church name	Location of the church	Year built
Bjordal og Ortnevik	Bjordal Church	Bjordal	1906
Bjordal og Ortnevik	Ortnevik Church	Ortnevik	1925
Høyanger	Høyanger Church	Høyanger	1960
Kyrkjebø	Kyrkjebø Church	Kyrkjebø	1869
Kyrkjebø	Vadheim Chapel	Vadheim	1916
Lavik	Lavik Church	Lavik	1865

== Government ==
Høyanger Municipality is responsible for primary education (through 10th grade), outpatient health services, senior citizen services, welfare and other social services, zoning, economic development, and municipal roads and utilities. The municipality is governed by a municipal council of directly elected representatives. The mayor is indirectly elected by a vote of the municipal council. The municipality is under the jurisdiction of the Sogn og Fjordane District Court and the Gulating Court of Appeal.

=== Municipal council ===
The municipal council (Kommunestyre) of Høyanger Municipality is made up of 21 representatives that are elected to four-year terms. The tables below show the current and historical composition of the council by political party.

Høyanger kommunestyre 2023–2027
Party name (in Nynorsk)	Number of representatives
Labour Party (Arbeidarpartiet)	8
Conservative Party (Høgre)	2
Industry and Business Party (Industri‑ og Næringspartiet)	2
Red Party (Raudt)	3
Centre Party (Senterpartiet)	5
Socialist Left Party (Sosialistisk Venstreparti)	1
Total number of members:	21

Høyanger kommunestyre 2019–2023
Party name (in Nynorsk)	Number of representatives
Labour Party (Arbeidarpartiet)	9
Conservative Party (Høgre)	2
Red Party (Raudt)	3
Centre Party (Senterpartiet)	6
Socialist Left Party (Sosialistisk Venstreparti)	1
Total number of members:	21

Høyanger kommunestyre 2015–2019
Party name (in Nynorsk)	Number of representatives
Labour Party (Arbeidarpartiet)	11
Conservative Party (Høgre)	2
Christian Democratic Party (Kristeleg Folkeparti)	1
Red Party (Raudt)	2
Centre Party (Senterpartiet)	5
Total number of members:	21

Høyanger kommunestyre 2011–2015
Party name (in Nynorsk)	Number of representatives
Labour Party (Arbeidarpartiet)	10
Conservative Party (Høgre)	4
Christian Democratic Party (Kristeleg Folkeparti)	1
Red Party (Raudt)	2
Centre Party (Senterpartiet)	4
Total number of members:	21

Høyanger kommunestyre 2007–2011
Party name (in Nynorsk)	Number of representatives
Labour Party (Arbeidarpartiet)	10
Conservative Party (Høgre)	4
Christian Democratic Party (Kristeleg Folkeparti)	1
Red Electoral Alliance (Raud Valallianse)	2
Centre Party (Senterpartiet)	3
Socialist Left Party (Sosialistisk Venstreparti)	1
Total number of members:	21

Høyanger kommunestyre 2003–2007
Party name (in Nynorsk)	Number of representatives
Labour Party (Arbeidarpartiet)	11
Conservative Party (Høgre)	3
Coastal Party (Kystpartiet)	2
Red Electoral Alliance (Raud Valallianse)	1
Centre Party (Senterpartiet)	3
Socialist Left Party (Sosialistisk Venstreparti)	1
Total number of members:	21

Høyanger kommunestyre 1999–2003
Party name (in Nynorsk)	Number of representatives
Labour Party (Arbeidarpartiet)	11
Progress Party (Framstegspartiet)	1
Conservative Party (Høgre)	8
Christian Democratic Party (Kristeleg Folkeparti)	1
Red Electoral Alliance (Raud Valallianse)	2
Centre Party (Senterpartiet)	4
Socialist Left Party (Sosialistisk Venstreparti)	2
Total number of members:	29

Høyanger kommunestyre 1995–1999
Party name (in Nynorsk)	Number of representatives
Labour Party (Arbeidarpartiet)	14
Progress Party (Framstegspartiet)	1
Conservative Party (Høgre)	4
Christian Democratic Party (Kristeleg Folkeparti)	1
Red Electoral Alliance (Raud Valallianse)	2
Centre Party (Senterpartiet)	5
Socialist Left Party (Sosialistisk Venstreparti)	2
Total number of members:	29

Høyanger kommunestyre 1991–1995
Party name (in Nynorsk)	Number of representatives
Labour Party (Arbeidarpartiet)	13
Conservative Party (Høgre)	4
Christian Democratic Party (Kristeleg Folkeparti)	2
Red Electoral Alliance (Raud Valallianse)	1
Centre Party (Senterpartiet)	4
Socialist Left Party (Sosialistisk Venstreparti)	3
Common list (Samlingslista)	2
Total number of members:	29

Høyanger kommunestyre 1987–1991
Party name (in Nynorsk)	Number of representatives
Labour Party (Arbeidarpartiet)	16
Conservative Party (Høgre)	4
Christian Democratic Party (Kristeleg Folkeparti)	2
Red Electoral Alliance (Raud Valallianse)	1
Centre Party (Senterpartiet)	2
Socialist Left Party (Sosialistisk Venstreparti)	2
Common list (Samlingslista)	2
Total number of members:	29

Høyanger kommunestyre 1983–1987
Party name (in Nynorsk)	Number of representatives
Labour Party (Arbeidarpartiet)	17
Conservative Party (Høgre)	5
Christian Democratic Party (Kristeleg Folkeparti)	2
Red Electoral Alliance (Raud Valallianse)	1
Centre Party (Senterpartiet)	2
Socialist Left Party (Sosialistisk Venstreparti)	3
Liberal Party (Venstre)	2
Common list (Samlingslista)	3
Total number of members:	35

Høyanger kommunestyre 1979–1983
Party name (in Nynorsk)	Number of representatives
Labour Party (Arbeidarpartiet)	18
Conservative Party (Høgre)	5
Christian Democratic Party (Kristeleg Folkeparti)	3
New People's Party (Nye Folkepartiet)	1
Centre Party (Senterpartiet)	3
Socialist Left Party (Sosialistisk Venstreparti)	2
Liberal Party (Venstre)	2
Common list (Samlingslista)	1
Total number of members:	35

Høyanger kommunestyre 1975–1979
Party name (in Nynorsk)	Number of representatives
Labour Party (Arbeidarpartiet)	14
Christian Democratic Party (Kristeleg Folkeparti)	3
Centre Party (Senterpartiet)	3
Socialist Left Party (Sosialistisk Venstreparti)	2
Joint list of the Conservative Party (Høgre), Liberal Party (Venstre), and New People's Party (Nye Folkepartiet)	5
Common list in Høyanger (Samlingslista i Høyanger)	3
Non-party list in Høyanger (Upolitisk Liste i Høyanger)	5
Total number of members:	35

Høyanger kommunestyre 1971–1975
Party name (in Nynorsk)	Number of representatives
Labour Party (Arbeidarpartiet)	15
Conservative Party (Høgre)	2
Christian Democratic Party (Kristeleg Folkeparti)	3
Centre Party (Senterpartiet)	3
Liberal Party (Venstre)	3
Local List(s) (Lokale lister)	5
Socialist common list (Venstresosialistiske felleslister)	3
Total number of members:	35

Høyanger kommunestyre 1967–1971
Party name (in Nynorsk)	Number of representatives
Labour Party (Arbeidarpartiet)	15
Conservative Party (Høgre)	2
Communist Party (Kommunistiske Parti)	1
Christian Democratic Party (Kristeleg Folkeparti)	2
Centre Party (Senterpartiet)	3
Socialist People's Party (Sosialistisk Folkeparti)	4
Liberal Party (Venstre)	5
Local List(s) (Lokale lister)	3
Total number of members:	35

Høyanger kommunestyre 1964–1967
Party name (in Nynorsk)	Number of representatives
Labour Party (Arbeidarpartiet)	18
Communist Party (Kommunistiske Parti)	3
Christian Democratic Party (Kristeleg Folkeparti)	2
Joint List(s) of Non-Socialist Parties (Borgarlege Felleslister)	9
Local List(s) (Lokale lister)	3
Total number of members:	35
Note: On 1 January 1964, Kyrkjebø Municipality, Lavik Municipality, and a small part of Vik Municipality were merged to form the new Høyanger Municipality.

=== Mayors ===
The mayor (Nynorsk: ordførar) of Høyanger Municipality is the political leader of the municipality and the chairperson of the municipal council. Here is a list of people who have held this position:

- 1964–1967: Albert Hellem (Ap)
- 1968–1975: Einar Lavik (Ap)
- 1976–1991: Arvid Lillehauge (Ap)
- 1991–1992: Bodil Bye Stavang (Ap)
- 1992–1995: Liv Lønne (Ap)
- 1996–2011: Kjartan Longva (Ap)
- 2011–present: Petter Sortland (Ap)

== Geography ==
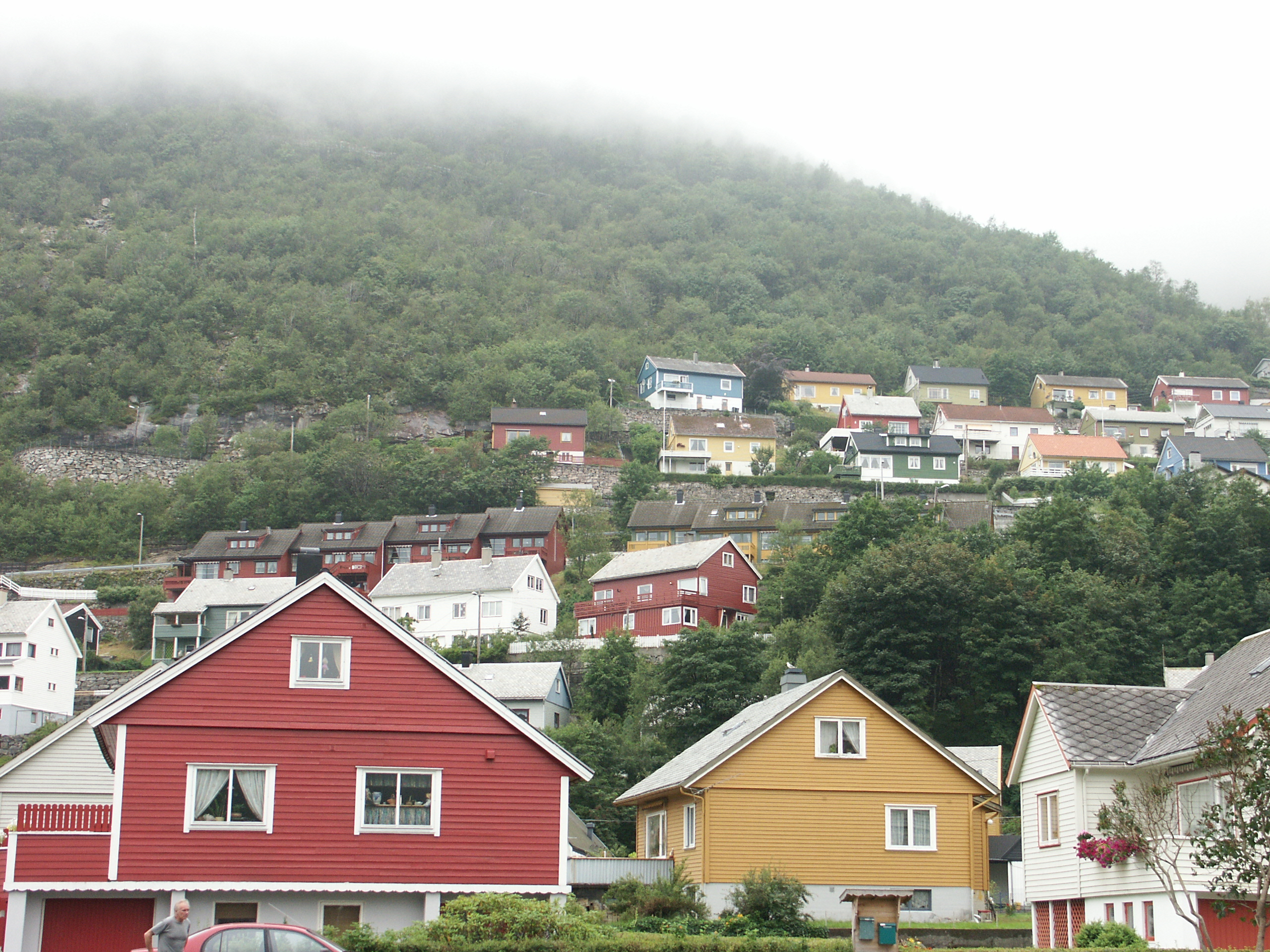
View of the village of Høyanger

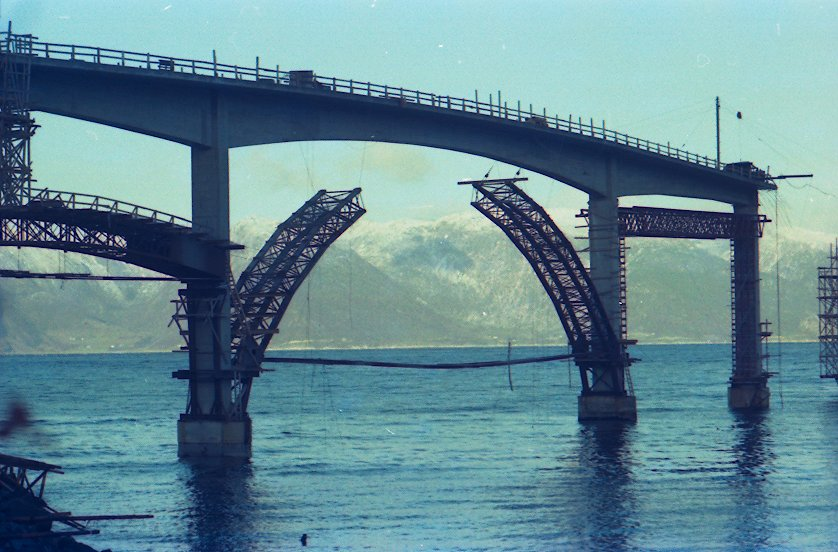
Construction of the Ikjefjord bridge

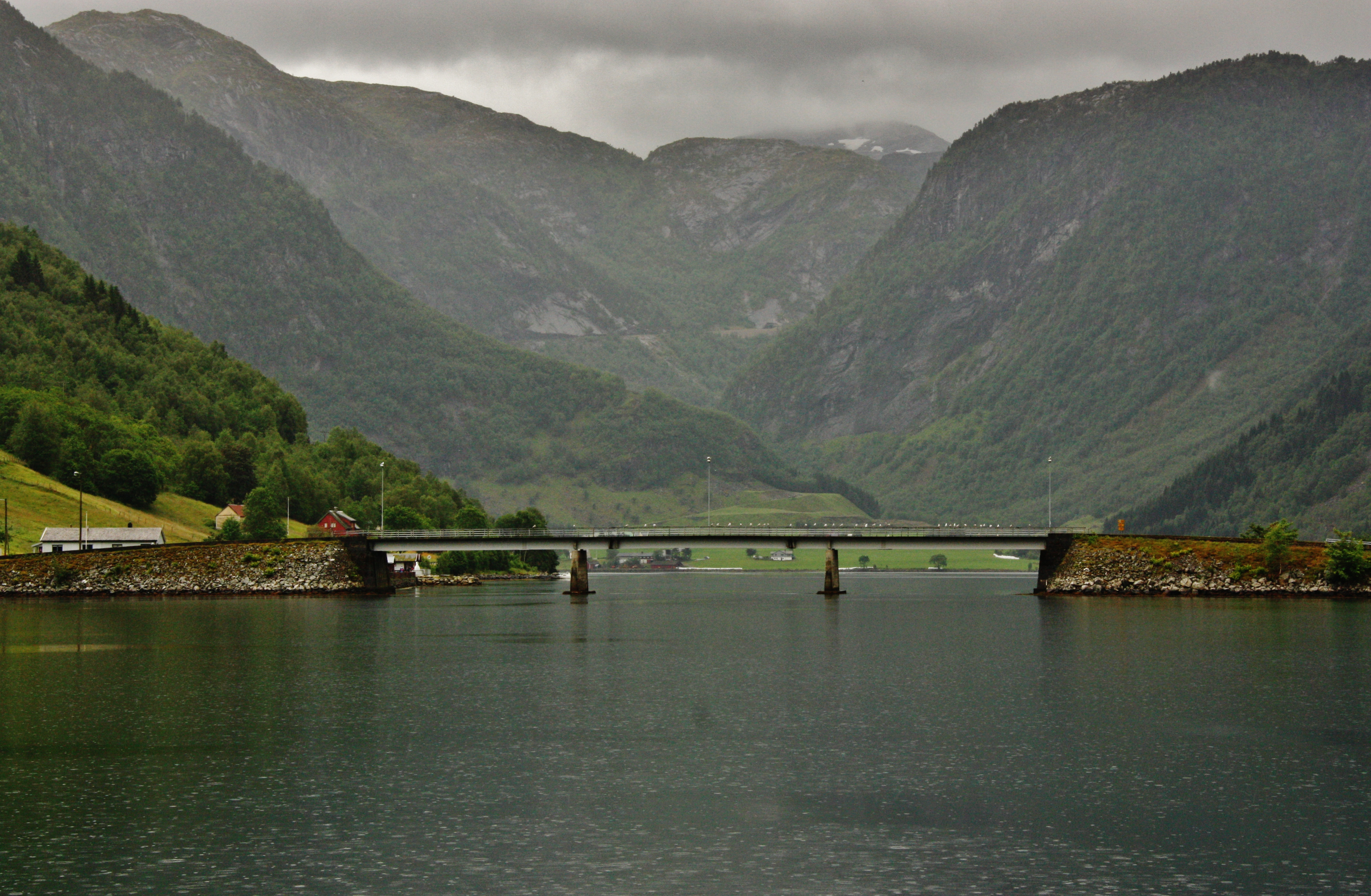
View of the Fuglsetfjorden

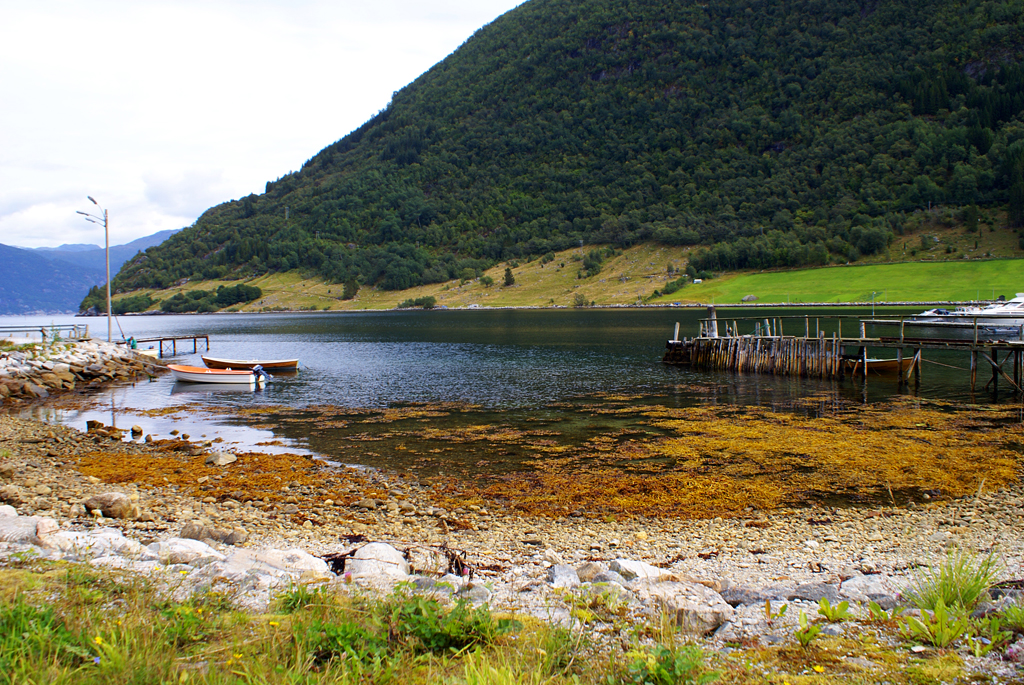
View from Ortnevik, looking at the fjord

The Sognefjorden (the largest fjord in Norway) runs through the center of the municipality. Høyanger Municipality is bordered to the north by Fjaler Municipality and Sunnfjord Municipality, to the east by Sogndal Municipality and Vik Municipality, to the south by Modalen Municipality and Masfjorden Municipality, and to the west by Gulen Municipality and Hyllestad Municipality.

Høyanger Municipality covers an area of about 1,000 square kilometres (390 sq mi). Stølsheimen Nature Reserve was created in 1990 in Høyanger Municipality. Its 367 square kilometres (142 sq mi) area stretches from high mountaintops through fertile valleys and sweeps over steep meadows down to the fjord. Høyanger Municipality is perhaps best known for its mountain farms and lakes. From the village of Ortnevik there are marked footpaths up to Stølsheimen Park and from the village of Bjordal you may drive up the Stordal road to the summit at 730 metres (2,400 ft) above sea level. The highest point in the municipality is the 1,455.53-metre (4,775.4 ft) tall unnamed mountain on the border with Sogndal Municipality.

== Economy ==
Høyanger is a modern industrial community which has grown in pace with the principal employers being Hydro Aluminium and Høyanger Metallverk. Hydroelectricity has played a major role in the development of the area. In addition to manufacturing aluminium, Høyanger supports a varied range of light industry that is backed by retail and service trades. In the rural areas bordering the fjord, farming is the main source of livelihood. There are currently 115 traditional farms gårds in the municipality. Each traditional farms originally had one owner, but most of them have been divided up and sold off over the years, and so there are more than 115 farms in use today.

== Transportation ==
There are good connections with Oslo and Bergen by bus, as well as air and fast boat services. The nearest airport is just outside the town of Førde, about 50 kilometres (31 mi) away. The village of Lavik is an important junction for traffic to and from Bergen as it is a ferry port that is part of the European route E39 highway. Høyanger is reached from the neighboring Sogndal Municipality to the east by the Høyangertunnelen which is 7.5 kilometres (4.7 mi) in length. It is part of the Norwegian County Road 55. It is one of the longest tunnels in Europe. Good ferry services across the Sognefjorden link the northern and southern sides of the municipality.

== Attractions ==
In 1986, in Høyanger, Norsk Hydro Aluminium/Høyanger Metallverk opened a museum designed to show what water power has meant both locally and to Norway as a whole. Visitors will get to learn about how the aluminium industry has grown and prospered in the area thanks to the vast energy produced by water.

Near Vadheim is an 18th-century stone bridge called the Ytredal Bridge. It is a popular tourist attraction.

There is also a 600 mm (1 ft 11 5/8 in) narrow-gauge funicular railway in the area, first opened in 1953.

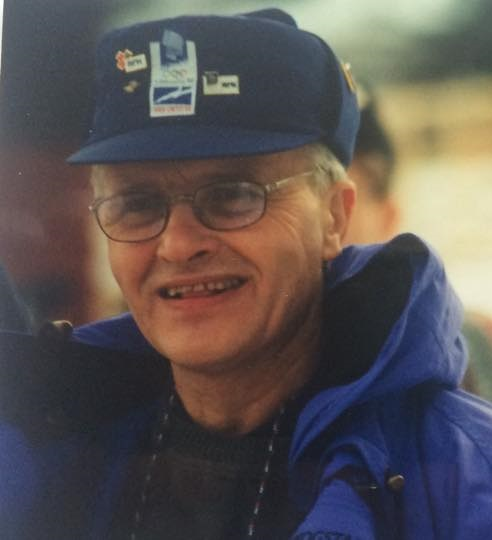
Einar Førde, 2015

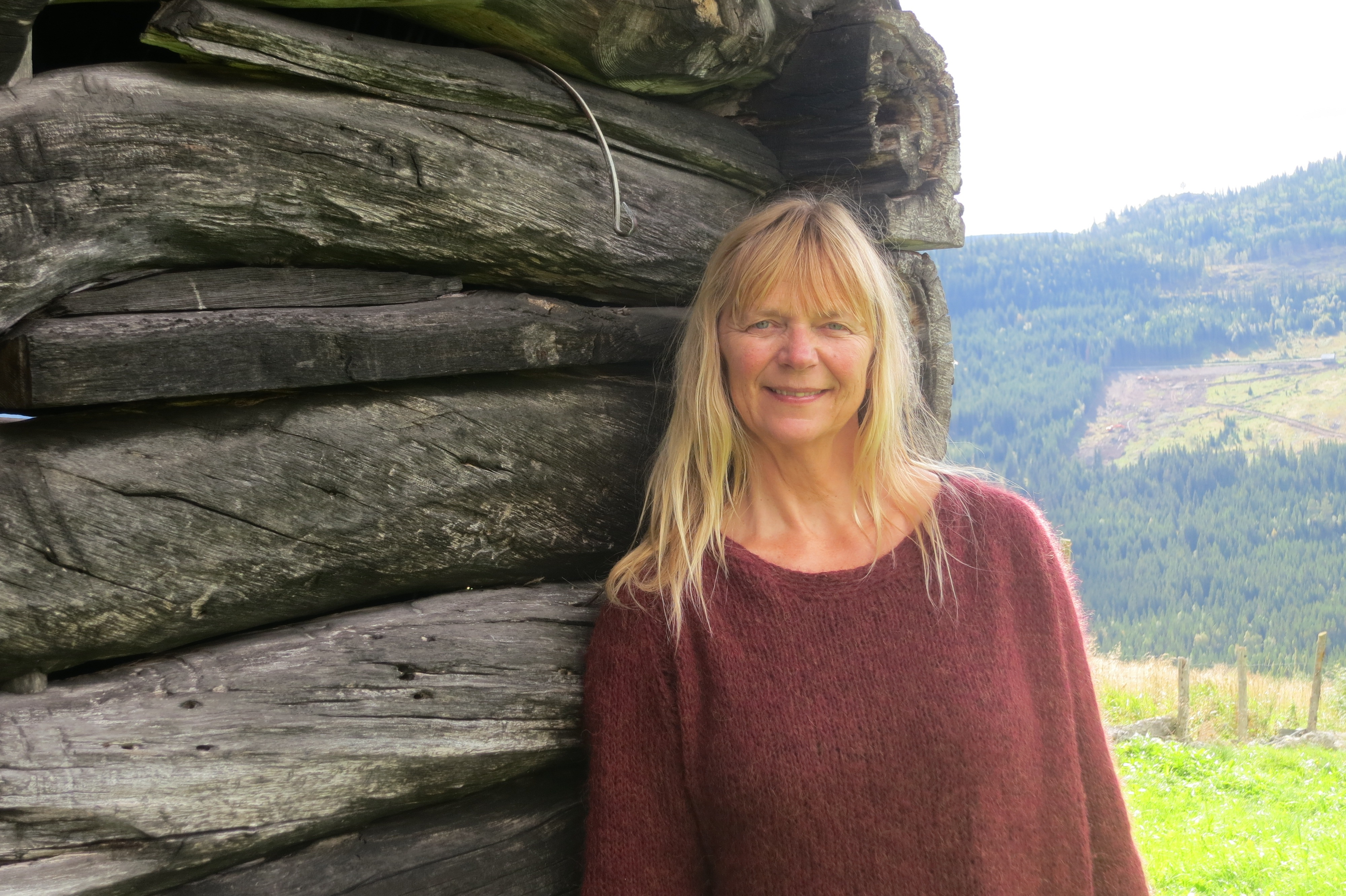
Marit Tusvik, 2017

== Notable people ==
- Johan Austbø (1879 in Ikjefjord – 1945), a teacher, dancer, poet, composer, singer, and proponent for the Nynorsk language
- Einar Liljedahl (1882 in Kyrkjebø – 1955), a Norwegian military officer
- Torfinn Haukås (1931–1993), a novelist
- Per Håland (1919 in Høyanger – 1999), a journalist, newspaper editor, and proponent for the Nynorsk language
- Tell Teigen (1923 in Høyanger - 1958), an acrobat who balanced on stacked chairs atop of masts over 35 metres (115 ft) tall
- Einar Kringlen (born 1931 in Høyanger), a physician, psychiatrist, and academic
- Noralv Teigen (1932 in Høyanger – 2017), an actor, theatre instructor, and theatre director
- Einar Førde (1943 in Høyanger – 2004), a journalist, politician, and director-general of the Norwegian Broadcasting Corporation (NRK) from 1989 to 2001
- Marit Tusvik (born 1951 in Høyanger), an author, poet, and playwright
- Even Hovland (born 1989 in Vadheim), a professional footballer with almost 300 club caps
- Vegar Gjermundstad (born 1990 in Vadheim), a football defender with over 200 club caps
