= Kyrkjebø Municipality =

Former municipality in Sogn og Fjordane, Norway

Kyrkjebø Municipality Kyrkjebø herad
- Former municipality
- Kirkebø herred (historic name); Klævold herred (historic name)
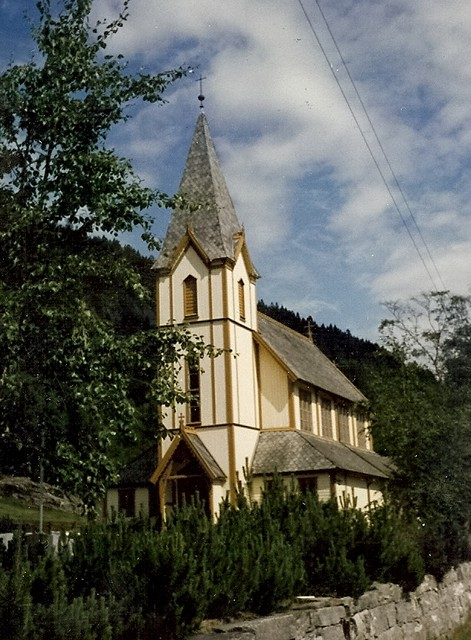
- View of Kyrkjebø Church

- Sogn og Fjordane within Norway

- Kyrkjebø within Sogn og Fjordane
- Coordinates: 61°09′49″N 05°53′59″E
- Country: Norway
- County: Sogn og Fjordane
- District: Sogn
- Established: 1 Jan 1858
  - Preceded by: Lavik Municipality
- Disestablished: 1 Jan 1964
  - Succeeded by: Høyanger Municipality
- Administrative centre: Kyrkjebø

Government
  - Mayor (1956–1963): Albert Hellem

Area
  - Total: 667 km^{2} (258 sq mi)
  - Rank: #146 in Norway
- Highest elevation: 1,455.53 m (4,775.4 ft)

Population (1963)
  - Total: 4,653
  - Rank: #190 in Norway
  - Density: 7/km^{2} (18/sq mi)
  - Change (10 years): ▲ +0.1%

Official language
  - Norwegian form: Nynorsk
- Time zone: UTC+01:00 (CET)
  - Summer (DST): UTC+02:00 (CEST)
- ISO 3166 code: NO-1416

Kyrkjebø is a former municipality in the old Sogn og Fjordane county, Norway. The 667-square-kilometre (258 sq mi) municipality existed from 1858 until its dissolution in 1964. The area is now part of Høyanger Municipality in the traditional district of Sogn in Vestland county. The administrative centre was the village of Kyrkjebø. Other villages in the municipality included Vadheim, Ortnevik, Høyanger, and Bjordal.

Prior to its dissolution in 1964, the 667-square-kilometre (258 sq mi) municipality was the 146th largest by area out of the 689 municipalities in Norway. Kyrkjebø Municipality was the 190th most populous municipality in Norway with a population of about 4,653. The municipality's population density was 7 inhabitants per square kilometre (18/sq mi) and its population had increased by 0.1% over the previous 10-year period.

== General information ==
The parish of Klævold was established as a municipality in 1858 when it was separated from the large Lavik Municipality. Initially, it had a population of 1,645. On 1 January 1875, a border adjustment took place, moving part of Klævold Municipality with 90 inhabitants to the neighboring Lavik og Brekke Municipality. On 1 July 1890, the name was changed from Klævold Municipality to Kirkebø Municipality, and then in 1917 it was changed again to Kyrkjebø Municipality.

During the 1960s, there were many municipal mergers across Norway due to the work of the Schei Committee. On 1 January 1964, the following areas were merged to form the new Høyanger Municipality:

- all of Kyrkjebø Municipality (population: 4,742)
- all of Lavik Municipality (population: 894)
- the unpopulated Nybø and Nygjerdet part of Vik Municipality

=== Name ===
The municipality was originally named after the old Klævold farm (Old Norse: Kleppavǫllr). The first element is uncertain. One possibility is that it comes from the word kleppr which means "hill" or "rock". Another possibility is that it comes from the word kleif which means "steep area on a mountainside". The last element is vǫllr which means "field", "flat ground", or "meadow". This is likely referring to a steep hill or rock located in the middle of an area of level ground.

Historically, the name of the municipality was Klævold. On 1 July 1890, a royal resolution changed the name of the municipality to Kirkebø since this was the historic location of the Kyrkjebø Church was built there. The first element is kirke which means "church". The last element is identical to the word bø which means "farmland" or "farm".

From 1890 until 1917, the name of the municipality was spelled Kirkebø (using the Bokmål spelling). On 3 November 1917, a royal resolution changed the spelling of the name of the municipality to Kyrkjebø (using the Nynorsk spelling).

=== Churches ===
The Church of Norway had one parish (sokn) within Kyrkjebø Municipality. At the time of the municipal dissolution, it was part of the Lavik prestegjeld and the Ytre Sogn prosti (deanery) in the Diocese of Bjørgvin.

Churches in Kyrkjebø Municipality
Parish (sokn)	Church name	Location of the church	Year built
Kyrkjebø	Bjordal Church	Bjordal	1906
Kyrkjebø	Høyanger Church	Høyanger	1960
Kyrkjebø	Kyrkjebø Church	Kyrkjebø	1869
Kyrkjebø	Ortnevik Church	Ortnevik	1925
Kyrkjebø	Vadheim Chapel	Vadheim	1916

== Geography ==
The municipality of Kyrkjebø included land on the north and south side of the Sognefjorden. The highest point in the municipality was the 1,455.53-metre (4,775.4 ft) tall unnamed mountain on the eastern border with Balestrand Municipality. Gaular Municipality was located to the north, Balestrand Municipality was located to the northeast, Vik Municipality was located to the east, Modalen Municipality was located to the south, Masfjorden Municipality was located to the southwest, Lavik Municipality was located to the west, and Fjaler Municipality was located to the northwest.

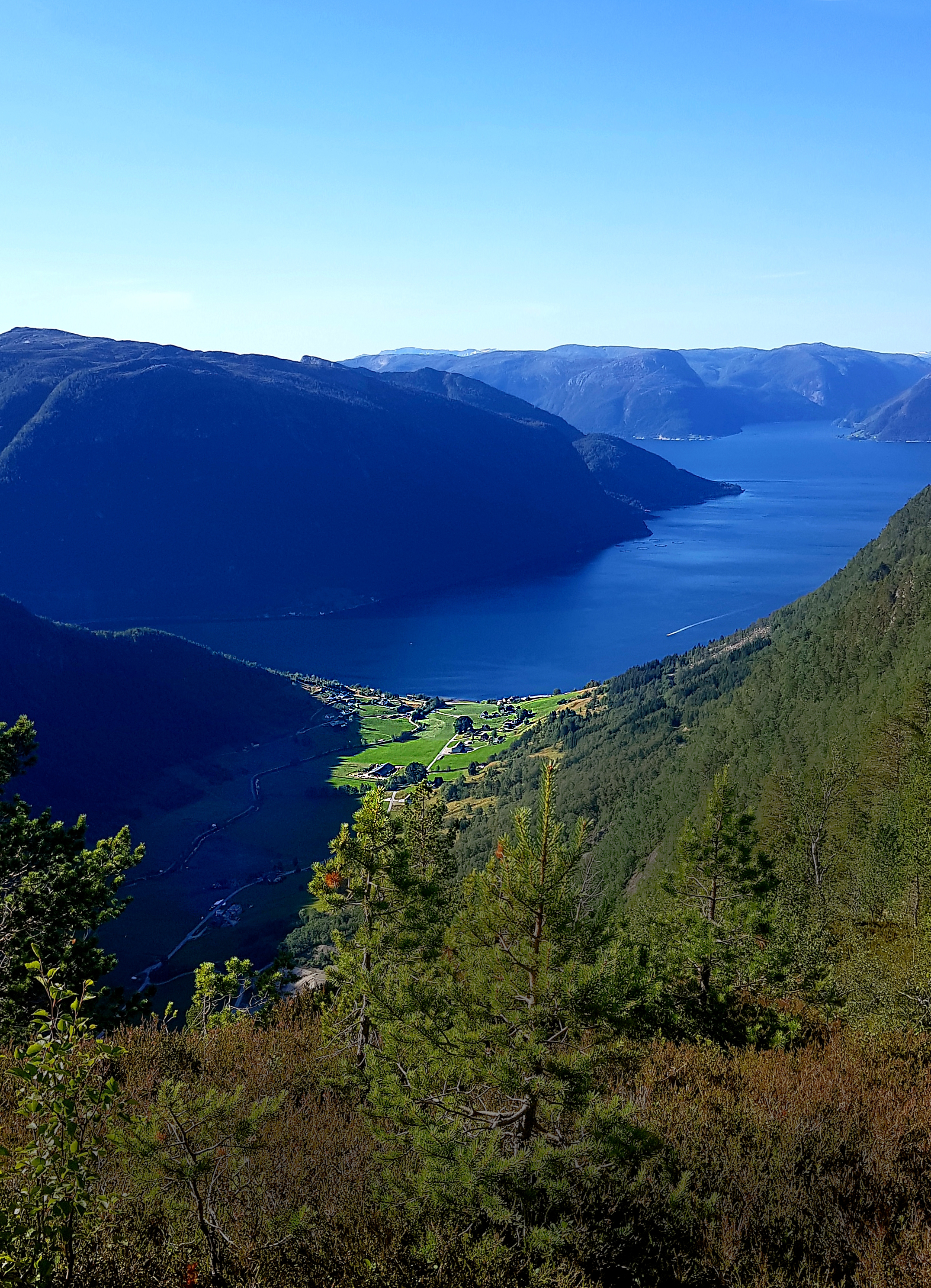
Bjordal

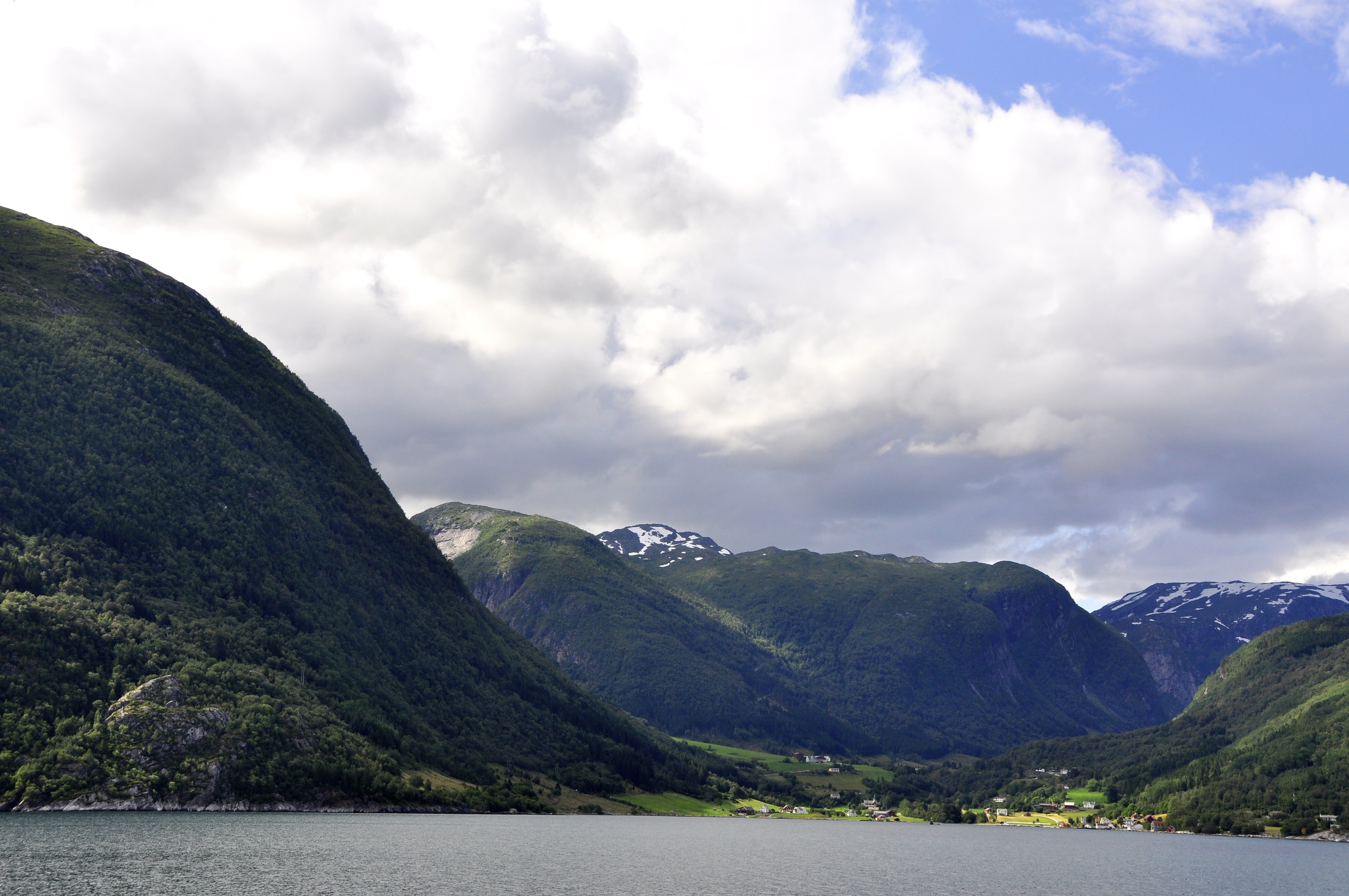
Ortnevik

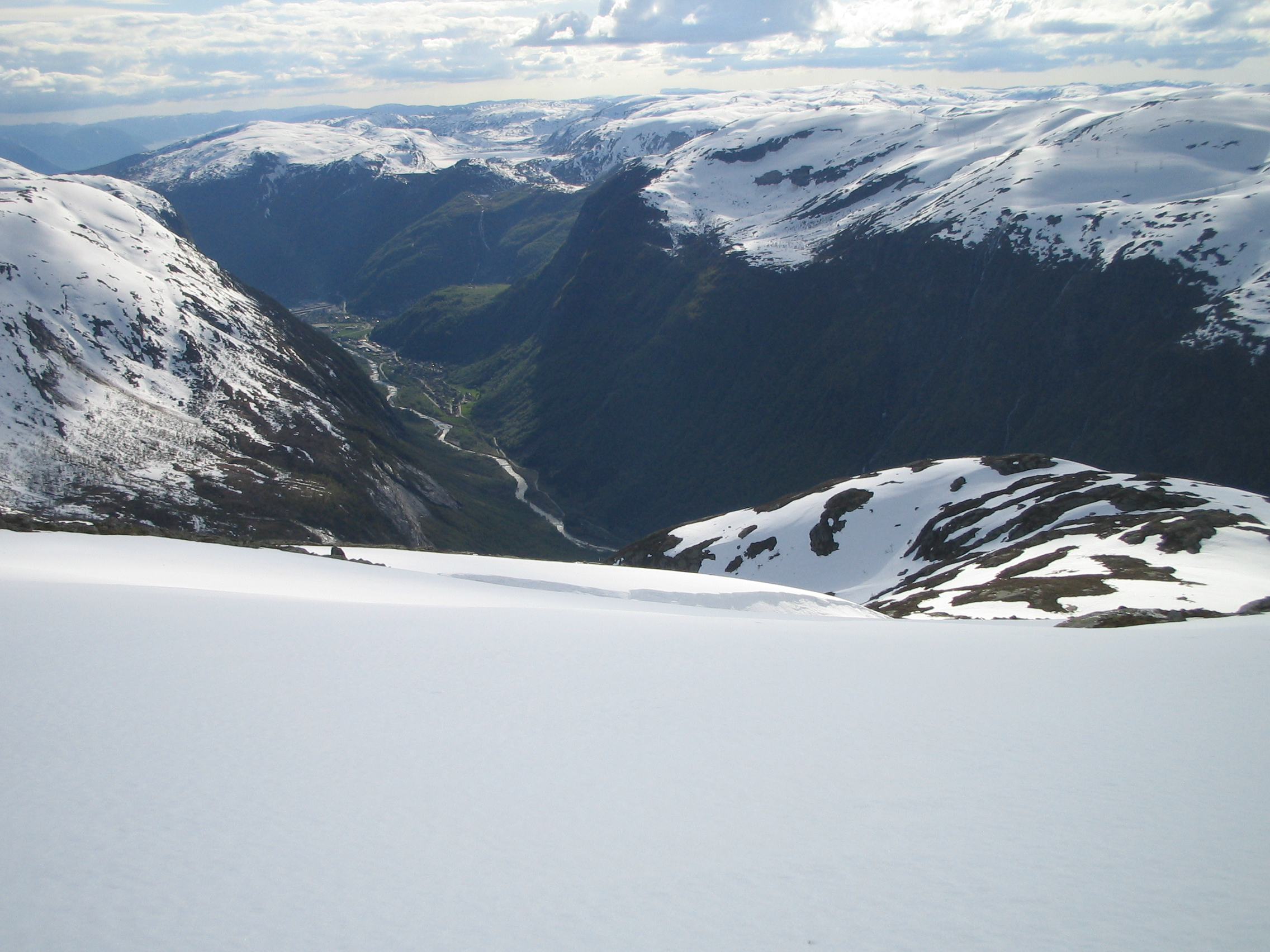
Høyanger

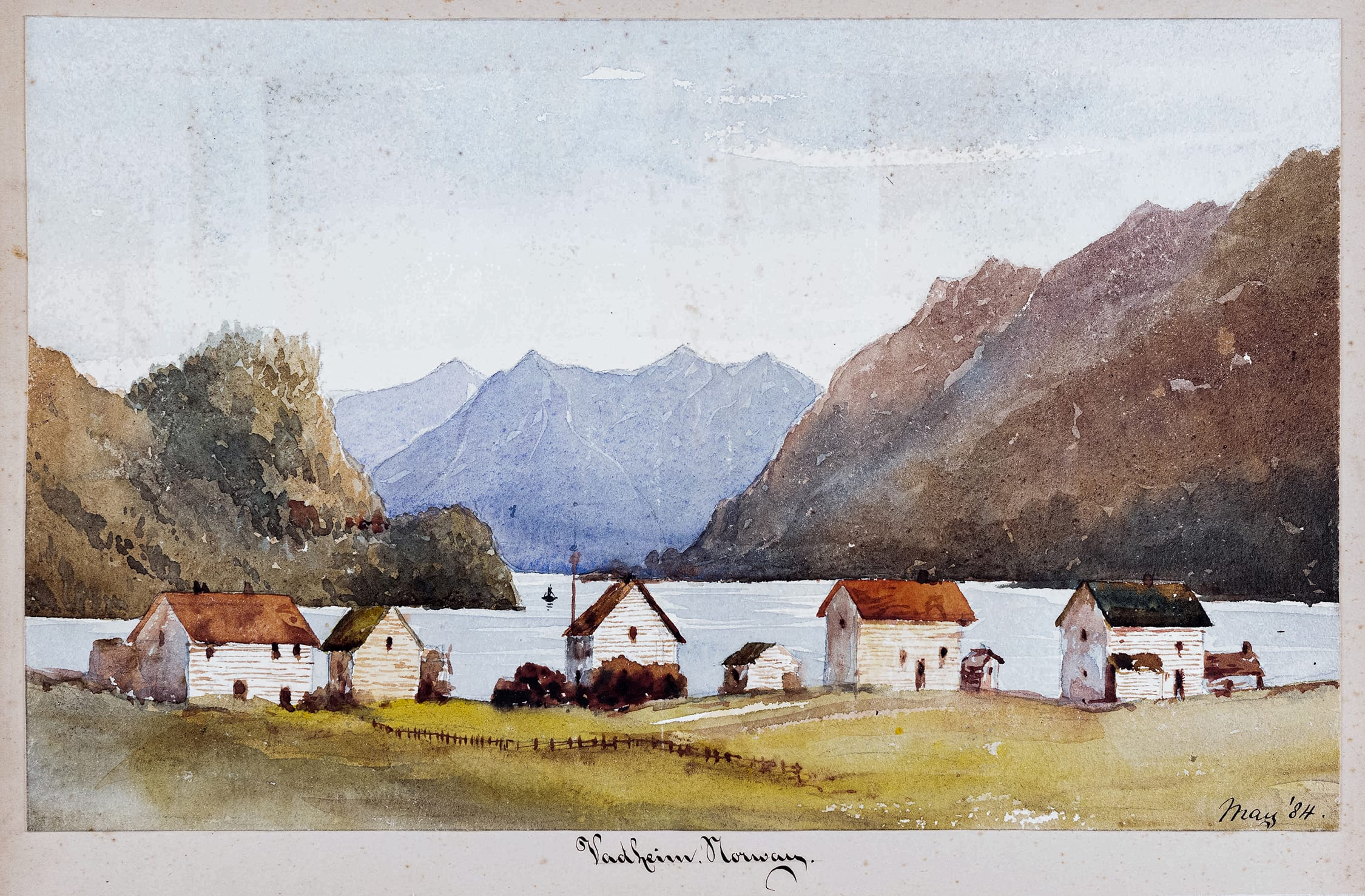
Watercolor of Vadheim

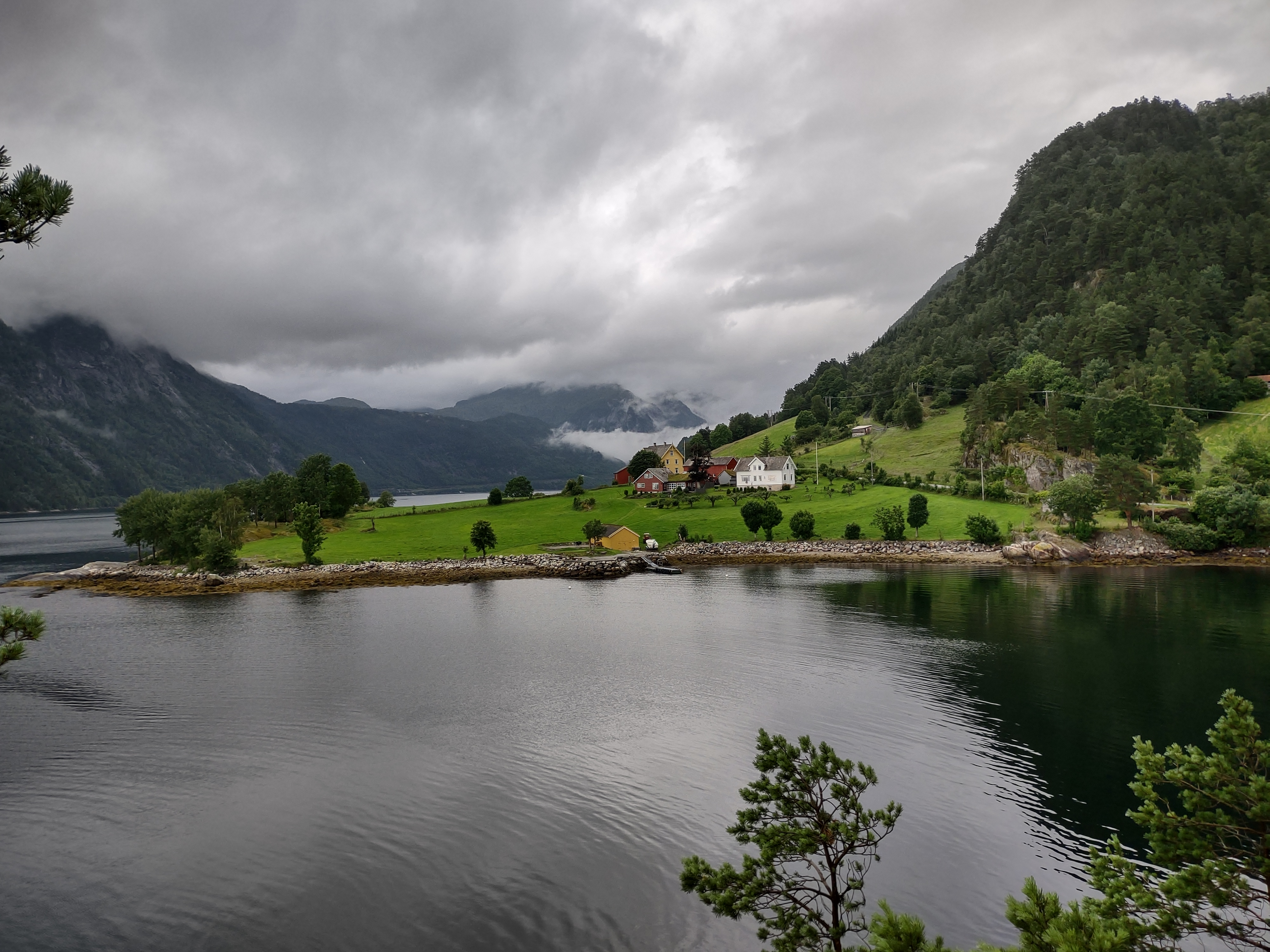
Klævold

== Government ==
While it existed, Kyrkjebø Municipality was responsible for primary education (through 10th grade), outpatient health services, senior citizen services, welfare and other social services, zoning, economic development, and municipal roads and utilities. The municipality was governed by a municipal council of directly elected representatives. The mayor was indirectly elected by a vote of the municipal council. The municipality was under the jurisdiction of the Gulating Court of Appeal.

=== Municipal council ===
The municipal council (Heradsstyre) of Kyrkjebø Municipality was made up of 29 representatives that were elected to four year terms. The tables below show the historical composition of the council by political party.

Kyrkjebø heradsstyre 1959–1963
Party name (in Nynorsk)	Number of representatives
Labour Party (Arbeidarpartiet)	15
Communist Party (Kommunistiske Parti)	4
Christian Democratic Party (Kristeleg Folkeparti)	2
Joint List(s) of Non-Socialist Parties (Borgarlege Felleslister)	8
Total number of members:	29

Kyrkjebø heradsstyre 1955–1959
Party name (in Nynorsk)	Number of representatives
Labour Party (Arbeidarpartiet)	15
Communist Party (Kommunistiske Parti)	4
Christian Democratic Party (Kristeleg Folkeparti)	2
Joint List(s) of Non-Socialist Parties (Borgarlege Felleslister)	8
Total number of members:	29

Kyrkjebø heradsstyre 1951–1955
Party name (in Nynorsk)	Number of representatives
Labour Party (Arbeidarpartiet)	15
Conservative Party (Høgre)	2
Communist Party (Kommunistiske Parti)	4
Christian Democratic Party (Kristeleg Folkeparti)	2
Farmers' Party (Bondepartiet)	3
Liberal Party (Venstre)	2
Total number of members:	28

Kyrkjebø heradsstyre 1947–1951
Party name (in Nynorsk)	Number of representatives
Labour Party (Arbeidarpartiet)	13
Conservative Party (Høgre)	2
Communist Party (Kommunistiske Parti)	5
Christian Democratic Party (Kristeleg Folkeparti)	3
Farmers' Party (Bondepartiet)	3
Liberal Party (Venstre)	2
Total number of members:	28

Kyrkjebø heradsstyre 1945–1947
Party name (in Nynorsk)	Number of representatives
Labour Party (Arbeidarpartiet)	16
Conservative Party (Høgre)	1
Christian Democratic Party (Kristeleg Folkeparti)	3
Farmers' Party (Bondepartiet)	2
Liberal Party (Venstre)	2
Total number of members:	24

Kyrkjebø heradsstyre 1937–1941*
Party name (in Nynorsk)	Number of representatives
Labour Party (Arbeidarpartiet)	16
Conservative Party (Høgre)	1
Farmers' Party (Bondepartiet)	3
Liberal Party (Venstre)	2
Local List(s) (Lokale lister)	2
Total number of members:	24
Note: Due to the German occupation of Norway during World War II, no elections were held for new municipal councils until after the war ended in 1945.

=== Mayors ===
The mayor (Nynorsk: ordførar) of Kyrkjebø Municipality was the political leader of the municipality and the chairperson of the municipal council. The following people held this position:

- 1858–1859: Gullak A. Haaland
- 1860–1863: Arne G. Afsnes
- 1864–1865: Knud H. Hovland
- 1866–1875: Arne G. Afsnes
- 1876–1887: Lars Ramsli
- 1888–1891: Edvard Liljedahl
- 1892–1898: Lars H. Dahle
- 1899–1904: Andreas B. Vamraak
- 1905–1913: Gunnar O. Mjølsvik
- 1914–1925: Anders H. Berge
- 1826–1931: August Gunnarskog
- 1932–1940: Knut Opdahl
- 1940–1945: Johan Arntzen
- 1945–1945: Anders Sterri
- 1945–1955: Magnus L. Osland
- 1956–1963: Albert Hellem

== Notable people ==
- Ivar Jacobsen Norevik (1900–1956), a politician
- Odd Vattekar (1918–1992), a politician

== See also ==
- List of former municipalities of Norway
