= Høyanger =

Høyanger may refer to:

== Places ==
- Høyanger Municipality, a municipality in Vestland county, Norway
- Høyanger (village), a village within Høyanger Municipality in Vestland county, Norway
- Høyanger Church, a church in Høyanger Municipality in Vestland county, Norway

== Other ==
- IL Høyang (informally called Høyanger), a sports club based in Høyanger Municipality in Vestland county, Norway
- Høyanger Verk, an old smelting company now part of Norsk Hydro in Høyanger Municipality in Vestland county, Norway
