= Haukas =

Haukas may refer to:

- Haukås, a family name
  - Michael Haukås (born 1986), Norwegian footballer
  - Torfinn Haukås (1931–1993), Norwegian novelist
- members of the Hauka movement, a religious movement which arose in French Colonial Africa
