= Ortnevik =

Village in Høyanger Municipality, Norway

Ortnevik Ortnevikane (historic)
- Village
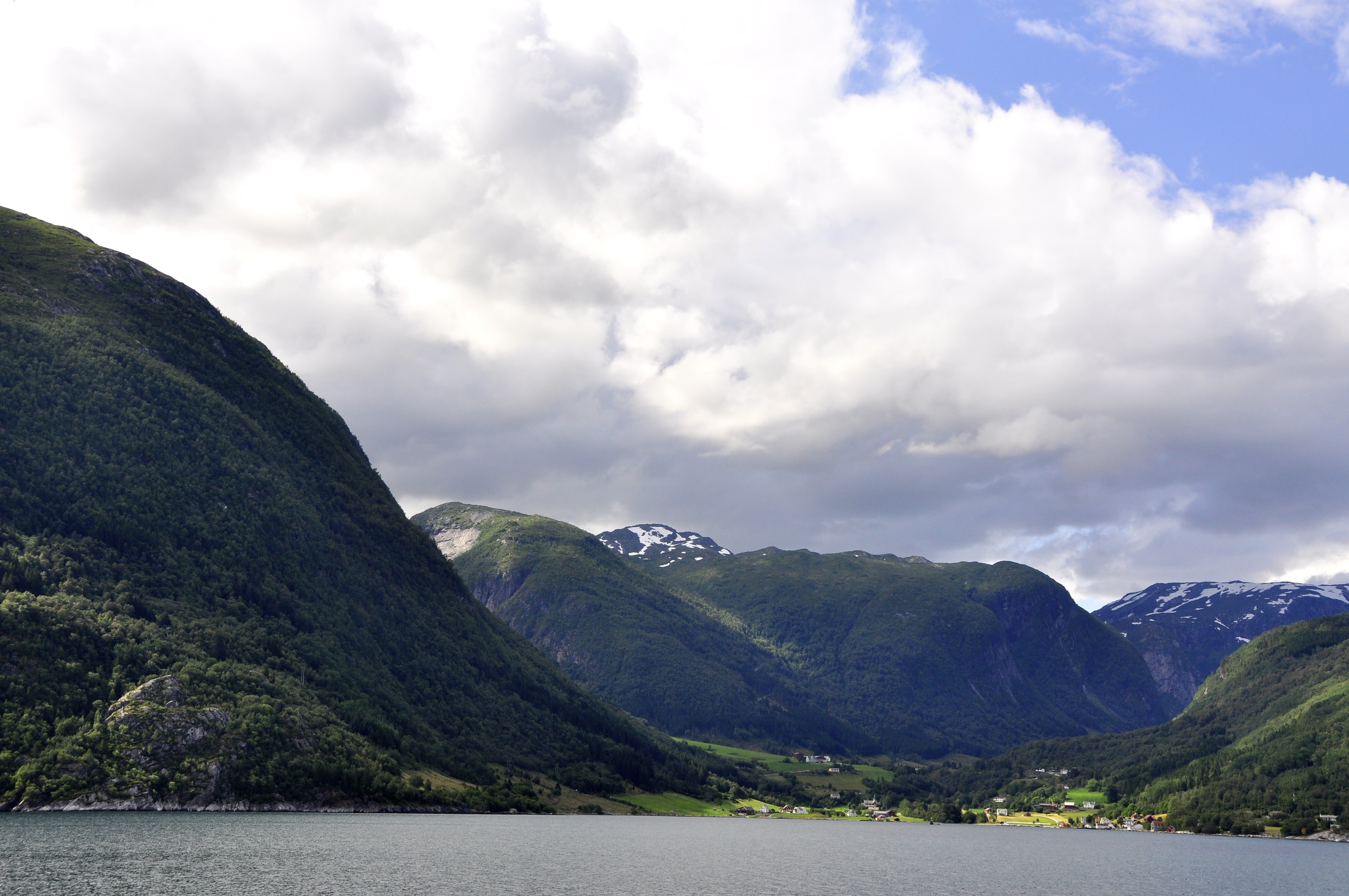
- View of the village from the fjord
- Interactive map of Ortnevik
- Location within Vestland Location within Norway
- Coordinates: 61.10833°N 6.13106°E
- Country: Norway
- Region: Western Norway
- County: Vestland
- District: Sogn
- Municipality: Høyanger Municipality
- Elevation: 8 m (26 ft)
- Time zone: UTC+01:00 (CET)
  - Summer (DST): UTC+02:00 (CEST)
- Post Code: 5962 Bjordal

Ortnevik is a village in Høyanger Municipality in Vestland county, Norway. The village is located on the south side of the Sognefjorden. The village is fairly isolated since there is only one road leading to it. Norwegian County Road 92 (Fv92) comes to Ortnevik from the west. The village of Bjordal lies about 20 kilometres (12 mi) to the west along Fv92. There is also a regular car ferry connection which goes from Ortnevik to the north side of the fjord. The ferry stops at Ortnevik, Måren, and Austreim, and a couple time each day it continues from Austreim to the village of Høyanger.

The village has about 45 year-round residents, but there are many more summer residents, since many people return to Ortnevik to live in their summer cabins in the village. The village sits in a small valley that has mountains on three sides and the fjord on the north side. The river Ortnevikelva runs through the village. Ortnevik Church is located in the village, serving the southeastern part of the municipality. There is also a small store, library, and community centre.
