= Tell Teigen =

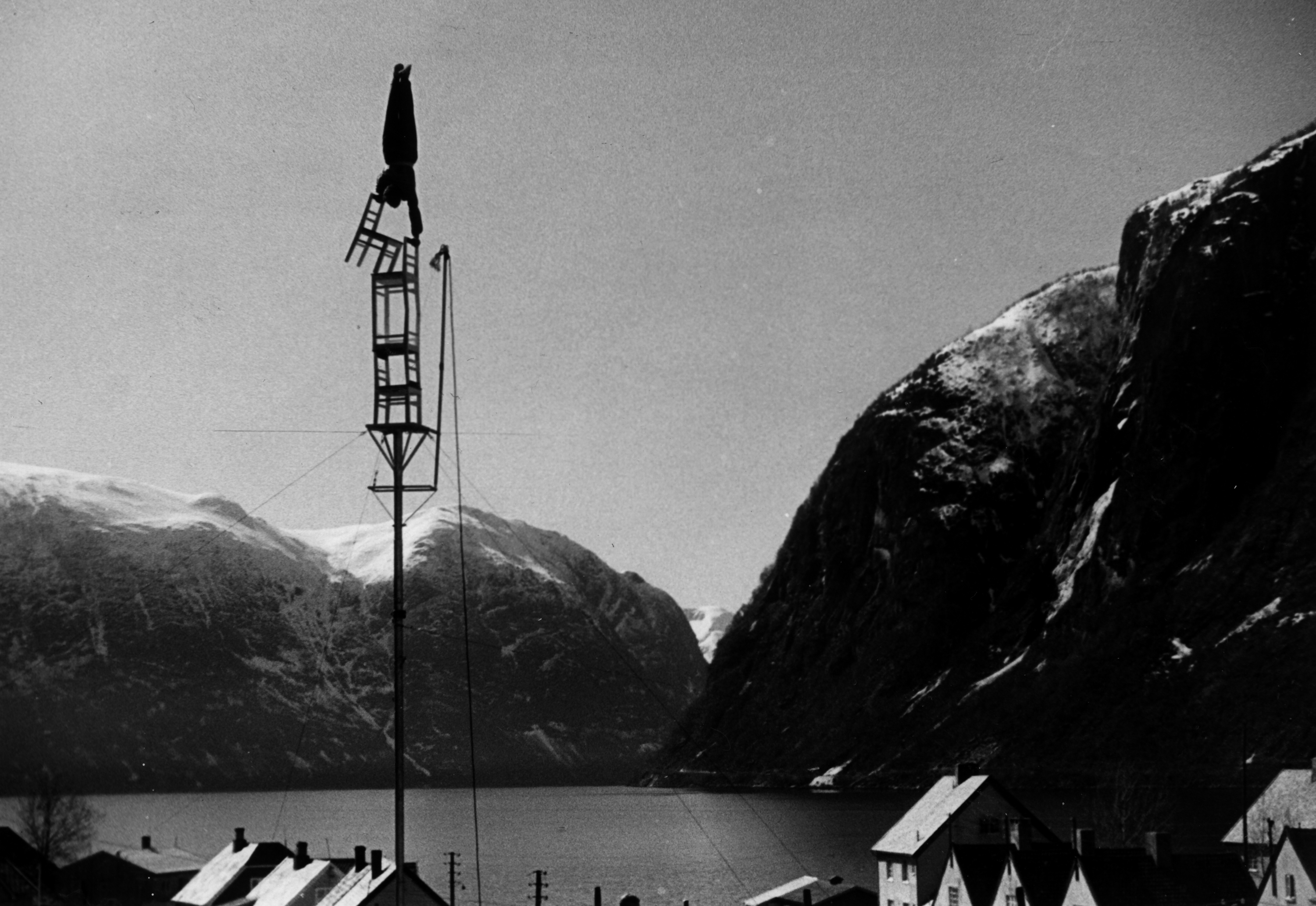
- Born: Trygve Teigen; 17 June 1923; Høyanger, Norway
- Died: 27 April 1958 (aged 34); Palm Springs, California
- Monuments: Høyanger Monument
- Citizenship: Norway
- Occupation: Acrobat
- Employer: Ringing Brothers Circus
- Known for: Balancing Acrobatics on Chairs on Top of 35 Meter High Pole
- Honours: Performer for Opening Ceremonies of 1952 Olympics in Helsinki

Tell Teigen (or Trygve Teigen, 1923-1958) was an acrobat born in Høyanger, Norway.

His speciality was balancing on stacked chairs atop of masts over 35 metres (115 ft) tall. He performed without any form of safety provisions or nets, not wanting to detract from the audience's experience. He performed all over the world, performing in the Opening Ceremonies of the Olympics in Helsinki in 1952. Tell Teigen was engaged by the circus Ringling Brothers in the United States. He performed the first one-man show at Madison Square Gardens. During a performance in 1958, he fell from a high mast and was killed.

In 2001, Balanse, a documentary was produced about the life of Tell Teigen. In 2008, a memorial was erected in his hometown of Høyanger, Norway designed by local artist Geir Hjetland.
