= Austreim =

Village in Høyanger Municipality, Norway

- Village
- Interactive map of Austreim
- Location within Vestland Location within Norway
- Coordinates: 61.16699°N 5.94922°E
- Country: Norway
- Region: Western Norway
- County: Vestland
- District: Sogn
- Municipality: Høyanger Municipality

Area
  - Total: 0.35 km^{2} (0.14 sq mi)
- Elevation: 46 m (151 ft)

Population (2025)
  - Total: 347
  - Density: 991/km^{2} (2,570/sq mi)
- Time zone: UTC+01:00 (CET)
  - Summer (DST): UTC+02:00 (CEST)
- Post Code: 6995 Kyrkjebø

Austreim is a village in Høyanger Municipality in Vestland county, Norway. The village is located on the north shore of the Sognefjorden, about 10 kilometres (6.2 mi) southwest of the municipal center of Høyanger, about 2.5 kilometres (1.6 mi) east of the village of Kyrkjebø, and about 12.5 kilometres (7.8 mi) southeast of the village of Vadheim where there is access to the European route E39 highway.

The 0.35-square-kilometre (86-acre) village has a population (2025) of 347 and a population density of 991 inhabitants per square kilometre (2,570/sq mi).

The village of Austreim was the site of a medieval stave church that was first mentioned in historical records in 1308. The church was torn down in the 1600s and a new church was built about 3 kilometres (1.9 mi) to the west in Kyrkjebø where the present Kyrkjebø Church is located. A memorial stone was erected in 1991 to mark the site of the historic church.
