= Gula Tidend =

Norwegian newspaper

Gula Tidend, Saturday, December 3, 1904

Gula Tidend (meaning Gula Times) is a former Norwegian newspaper. It was established in 1904 by Johannes Lavik, and disestablished in 1996. During World War II in response to the censorship of the occupying forces the paper temporarily ended its operations on 10 April 1940, a day after the occupation. The newspaper was a proponent for the Nynorsk language in Western Norway, located in Bergen.

Among its editors were Per Håland, who edited Gula Tidend for 25 years, from 1954 to 1979.
