= Einar Liljedahl =

Norwegian military officer (1882–1955)

- Born: 16 January 1882; Klævold Municipality, Norway
- Occupation: military officer
- Parent: Edvard Liljedahl
- Relatives: Ole Johan Vasbotten (brother-in-law)

Einar Liljedahl (16 January 1882 – February 1955) was a Norwegian military officer.

== Personal life ==
Liljedahl was born in Klævold Municipality, a son of politician Edvard Liljedahl and Barbra Ramslie. In 1919 he married Ellen Rosenkilde. He was a brother-in-law of Ole Johan Vasbotten.

== Career ==
Liljedahl graduated as officer from the Norwegian Military Academy in 1903, and from the Norwegian Military College in 1905.

He was promoted captain in 1911, major in 1930, colonel in 1934. From 1935 to 1947 he was head of 3rd Division of the Norwegian Army, with the rank of major general.

Following the outbreak of the Second World War, the 3rd Division was responsible for the "neutrality guard" in Agder and Rogaland. During the German attack on Norway in April 1940, the troops of the 3rd Division were rather unprepared for the situation, and surrendered after a few days.

Liljedahl was criticized for his dispositions during the German invasion of Norway, by the military investigation commission of 1946. He died in February 1955.
