= Einar Kringlen =

Norwegian psychiatrist (1931–2025)

- Born: 6 June 1931; Høyanger, Norway
- Died: 13 March 2025 (aged 93)
- Occupation: Psychiatrist
- Awards: Order of St. Olav

Einar Kringlen (6 June 1931 – 13 March 2025) was a Norwegian psychiatrist.

== Life and career ==
Kringlen was born in Høyanger on 6 June 1931; a son of teachers Andreas Kringlen and Enbjørg Lotsberg. He married schoolteacher Gerd Birthe Knutsen in 1957.

Among his early research works are Schizophrenia in male monozygotic twins from 1964, and his doctoral thesis Heredity and environment in the functional psychoses from 1967. He was a docent in psychiatry and subsequently professor at the University of Bergen from 1970 to 1971, and at the University of Oslo from 1977 to 2001. He was decorated Knight, First Class of the Order of St. Olav in 1998, and was inducted into the Norwegian Academy of Science and Letters. Kringlen died on 13 March 2025, at the age of 93.
