= Per Håland =

Norwegian journalist and newspaper editor

Per Håland (7 January 1919 – 9 October 1999) was a Norwegian journalist and newspaper editor, and proponent for the Nynorsk language. He was born in Høyanger. He was a journalist for Høyanger Avis from 1939 until the outbreak of World War II, and later for the newspapers Fjordabladet, Verdens Gang, Vest-Agder and Varden. He was chief editor of the newspaper Gula Tidend for 25 years, from 1954 to 1979.
