= Vadheim Chapel =

Church in Vestland, Norway

- Vadheim bedehuskapell
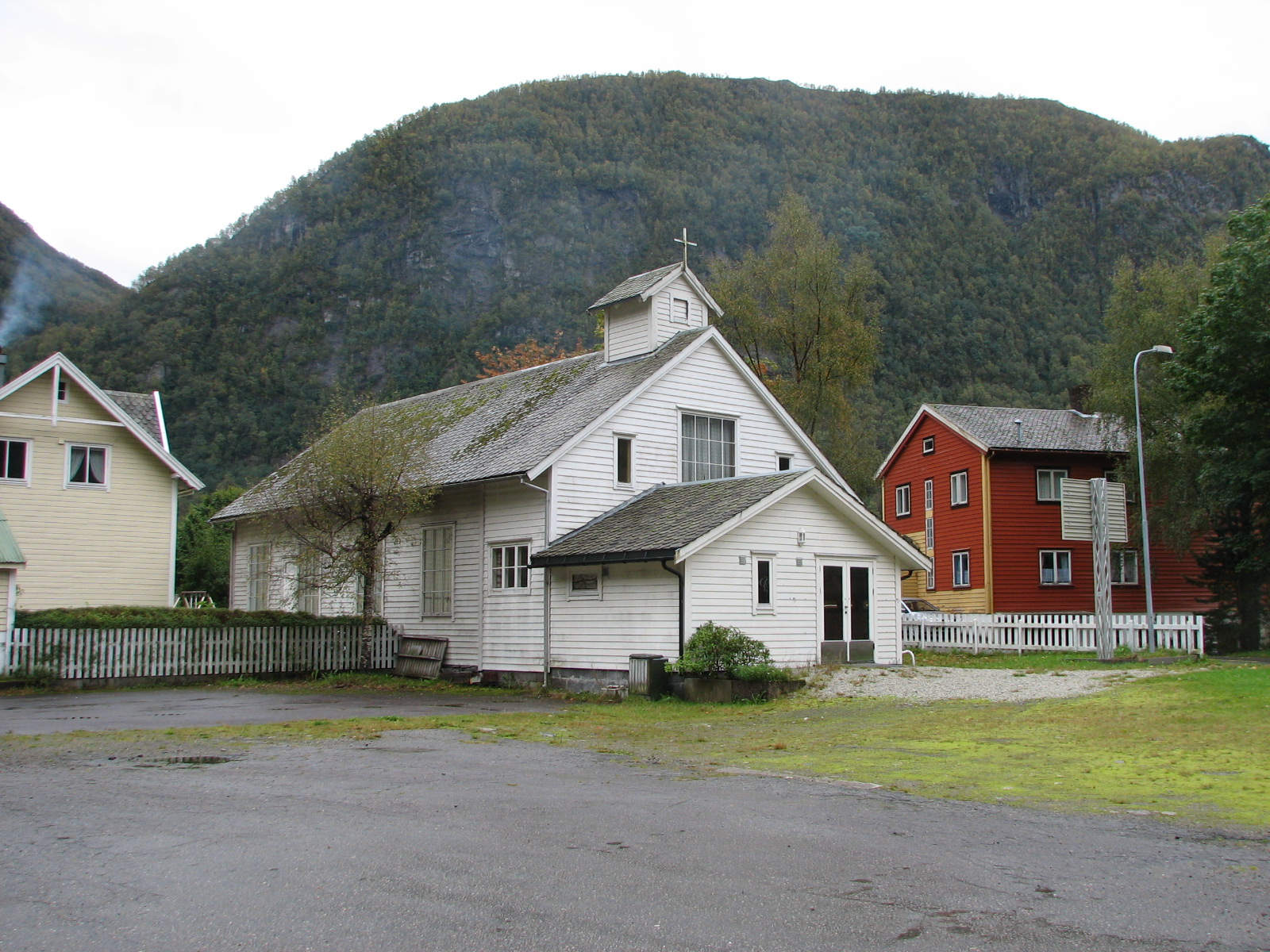
- View of the chapel
- Vadheim Chapel
- 61°12′33″N 5°49′29″E
- Location: Høyanger Municipality, Vestland
- Country: Norway
- Denomination: Church of Norway
- Churchmanship: Evangelical Lutheran

History
- Status: Chapel
- Founded: 1914
- Consecrated: 31 Jan 1954

Architecture
- Functional status: Active
- Architect: Andreas P. Vattekar
- Architectural type: Long church
- Completed: 1914 (112 years ago)

Specifications
- Capacity: 130
- Materials: Wood

Administration
- Diocese: Bjørgvin bispedømme
- Deanery: Sunnfjord prosti
- Parish: Kyrkjebø

Vadheim Chapel (Norwegian: Vadheim bedehuskapell) is a chapel of the Church of Norway in Høyanger Municipality in Vestland county, Norway. It is located in the village of Vadheim. It is an annex chapel in the Kyrkjebø parish which is part of the Sunnfjord prosti (deanery) in the Diocese of Bjørgvin. The white, wooden chapel was built in a long church design in 1914 as a prayer house using plans drawn up by the architect Andreas P. Vattekar. The chapel seats about 130 people.

== History ==
The people of Vadheim got permission to build a prayer house in 1914. The small prayer house was designed and built by Andreas P. Vattekar. Around 1950, the small building was renovated and enlarged. On 31 January 1954, the building was consecrated and upgraded to the status of a chapel within the Kyrkjebø Church parish. During the 1990s, a small kitchen and bathroom area were added on to the building. In 1998, a bell tower was added.

== See also ==
- List of churches in Bjørgvin
