= 3rd Division (Norway) =

Military unit in the Norwegian Army

The 3rd Division (Norwegian: 3. divisjon) is a former unit in the Norwegian Army, responsible for the defence of Agder and Rogaland.

Following the outbreak of the Second World War, the 3rd Division was set up to guard Norway's neutrality position in Agder and Rogaland. During the German attack on Norway, from 9 April 1940, the troops of the 3rd Division were not prepared for such a development, and surrendered after less than a week of the German attack, on 15 April.

The commander of 3rd Division during the period 1935 to 1947, was Major General Einar Liljedahl.
