= Noralv Teigen =

Norwegian actor, theatre instructor, and theatre director

- Born: 27 September 1932; Høyanger, Norway
- Died: 13 December 2017 (aged 85); Drøbak, Norway
- Occupations: actor and theatre director
- Awards: King's Medal of Merit

Noralv Teigen (27 September 1932 – 13 December 2017) was a Norwegian actor, theatre instructor and theatre director.

Teigen was born in Høyanger. He made his stage debut at Folketeatret in 1955, and was later assigned with Nationaltheatret and Riksteatret. From 1988 to 1991 he was appointed theatre director at Sogn og Fjordane Teater. Teigen also worked at the Radioteatret.

In 2002, he received the King's Medal of Merit. He resided in Frogn Municipality and died at Drøbak in 2017.
