= Bjordal =

Village in Høyanger Municipality, Norway

- Village
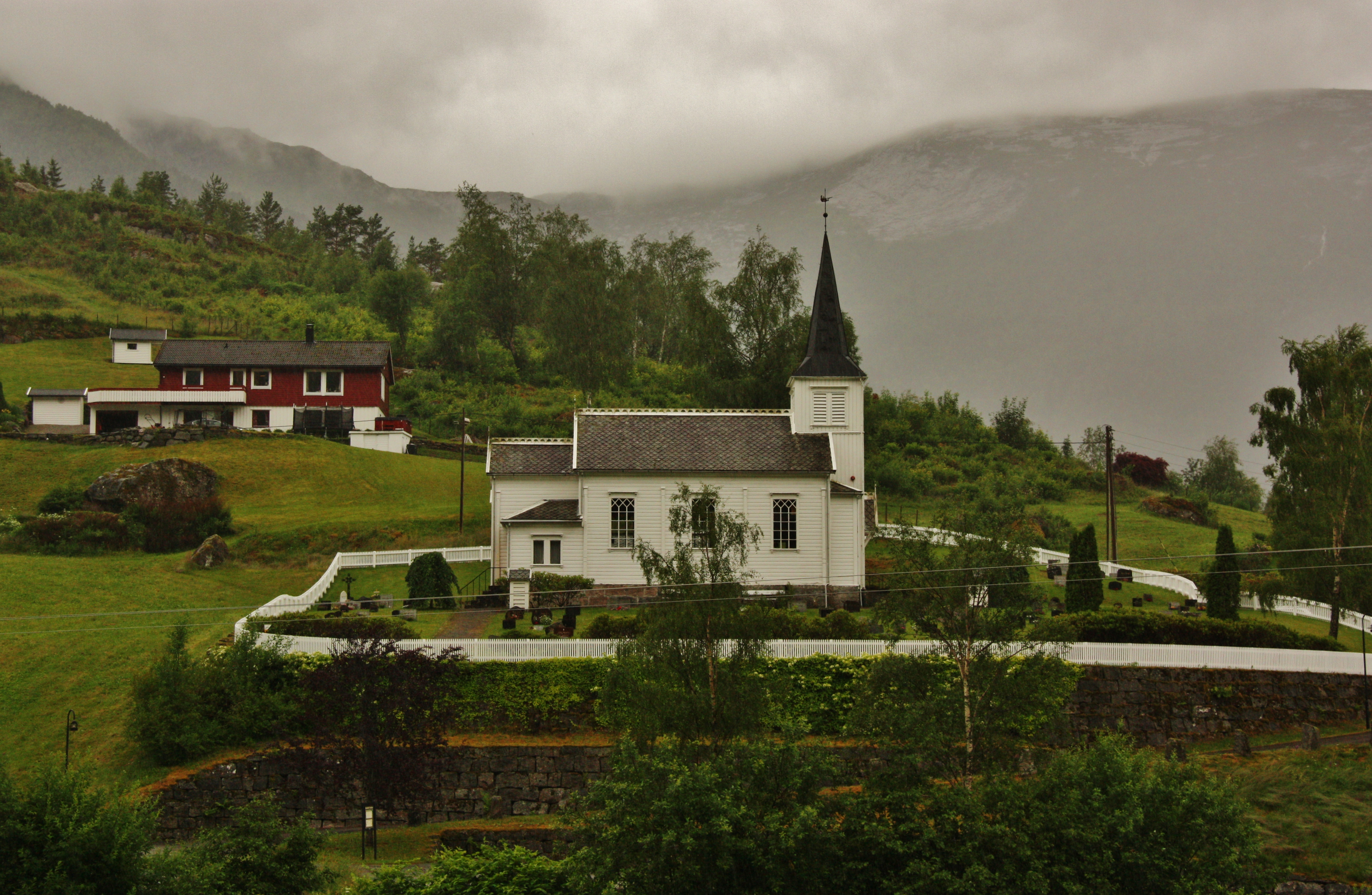
- View of the village church
- Interactive map of Bjordal
- Location within Vestland Location within Norway
- Coordinates: 61.07653°N 5.82989°E
- Country: Norway
- Region: Western Norway
- County: Vestland
- District: Sogn
- Municipality: Høyanger Municipality
- Elevation: 3 m (9.8 ft)
- Time zone: UTC+01:00 (CET)
  - Summer (DST): UTC+02:00 (CEST)
- Post Code: 5962 Bjordal

Bjordal is a village in Høyanger Municipality in Vestland county, Norway. The village is located along the Fuglsetfjorden, an arm that branches off the main Sognefjorden to the north. The village sits about 20 kilometres (12 mi) west of the village of Ortnevik and about 10 kilometres (6.2 mi) south of the village of Kyrkjebø, located on the north side of the fjord. Norwegian County Road 92 runs through Bjordal, connecting it to Ortnevik to the northeast and to the village of Matre in Masfjorden Municipality to the southwest.

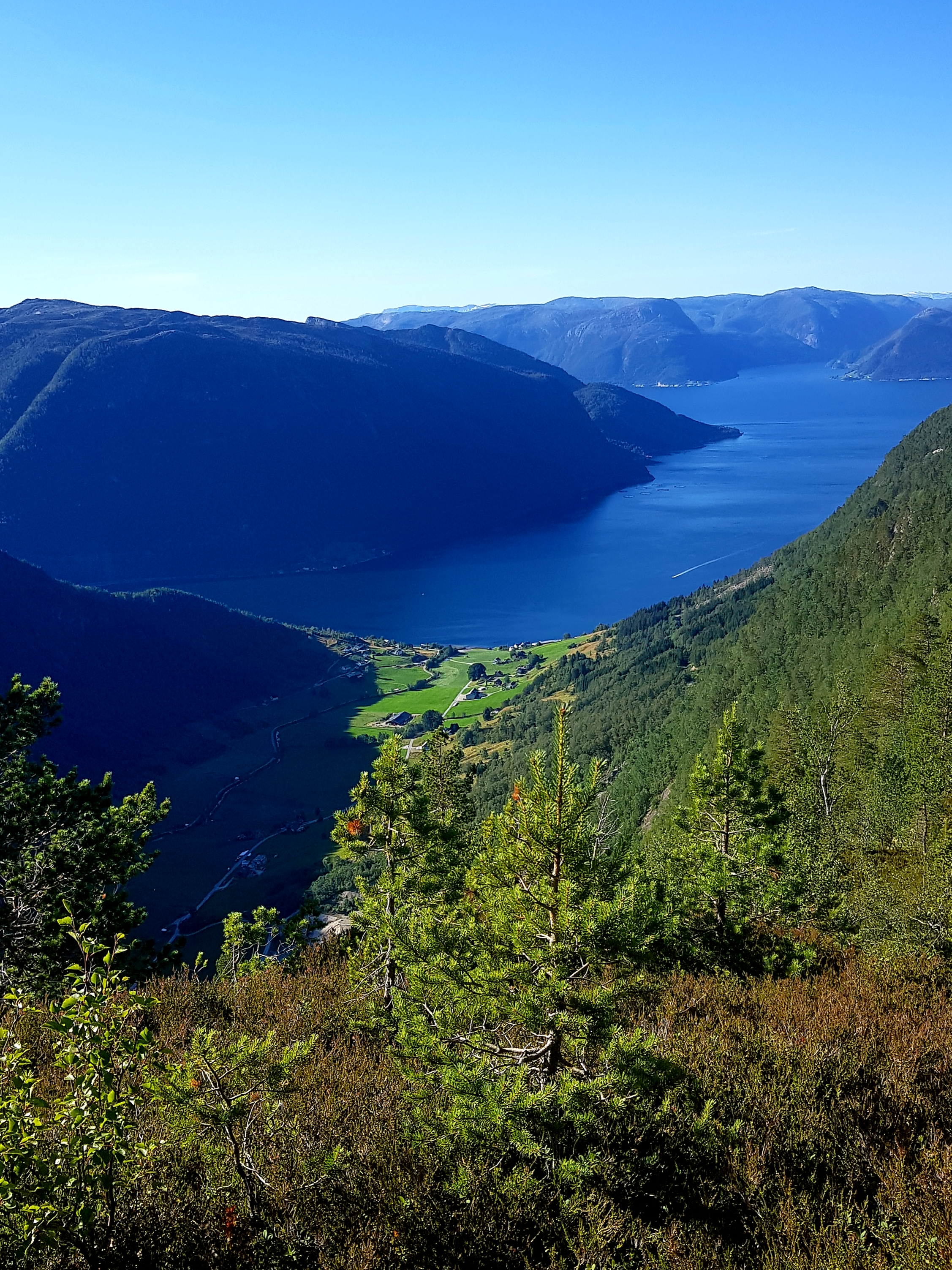
View of Bjordal Credit: Silje Bjordal

Bjordal is situated in a small valley surrounded by steep mountains on three sides and the fjord and on the north end of the valley. Bjordal Church is located in the village, serving the southwest part of the municipality. The white, wooden church was built in a long church design in 1906. The largest industry in the area is agriculture. There is also a rock quarry which exports stone elsewhere in the country.
