= Torfinn Haukås =

Norwegian novelist

Torfinn Haukås (1931–1993) was a Norwegian novelist.

He was born in Høyanger. Notable novels include 63 Johnsen (1958), Meg skal dere aldri få tak i (1967), Søndag i Andorra (1977) and Duellen (crime, 1981).
