= Vadheim =

Village in Høyanger Municipality, Norway

Vadheim Vaim
- Village
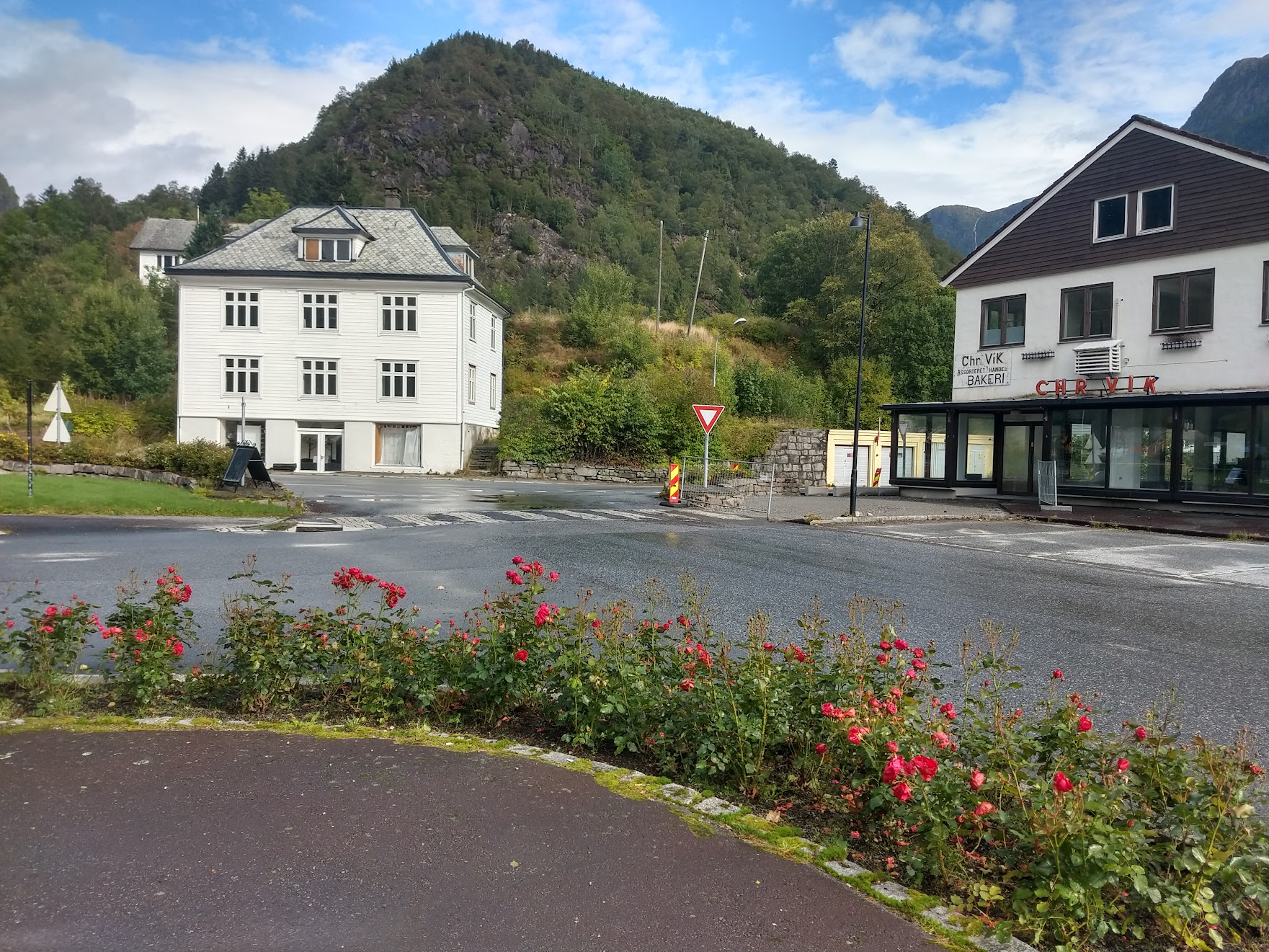
- View of Vadheim September 2020
- Interactive map of Vadheim
- Location within Vestland Location within Norway
- Coordinates: 61.20909°N 5.82528°E
- Country: Norway
- Region: Western Norway
- County: Vestland
- District: Sogn
- Municipality: Høyanger Municipality

Area
  - Total: 0.37 km^{2} (0.14 sq mi)
- Elevation: 1 m (3.3 ft)

Population (2018)
  - Total: 246
  - Density: 665/km^{2} (1,720/sq mi)
- Time zone: UTC+01:00 (CET)
  - Summer (DST): UTC+02:00 (CEST)
- Post Code: 6996 Vadheim

Vadheim is a village in Høyanger Municipality in Vestland county, Norway. It is located on the north shore of the Sognefjorden, along the small Vadheimsfjorden branch. The European route E39 highway runs through the village. t is located about 25 kilometres (16 mi) northeast of the village of Lavik, about 11 kilometres (6.8 mi) northwest of the village of Kyrkjebø, and about 13.5 kilometres (8.4 mi) northwest of the village of Austreim.

The 0.37-square-kilometre (91-acre) village had a population (2018) of 246 and a population density of 665 inhabitants per square kilometre (1,720/sq mi). Since 2018, the population and area data for this village area has not been separately tracked by Statistics Norway.

== Etymology ==
The name originates from the Norwegian words "vadestad", which translates to "shallow river crossing" and "heim" which translates to "home". "Vaim" is often used as a local nickname.

== History ==
=== Farming Community ===
Until around the year 1900 most people in Vadheim were farmers. The farmers often traveled to the city of Bergen to sell their goods. These goods often included wood, butter, animals and horses and were transported by the use of "jekter", a kind of small sailing ship.

=== Tourism ===
The road through Vadheim and up the Ytredalen valley towards Sunnfjord Municipality has been an important thoroughfare since time immemorial. The main road was completed in 1895. The central placement of Vadheim resulted in the village becoming a hub for tourism. In 1882, the Vadheim Hotel was built and the transport of tourists through the village became an important source of income for the farmers.

=== Industrialization ===
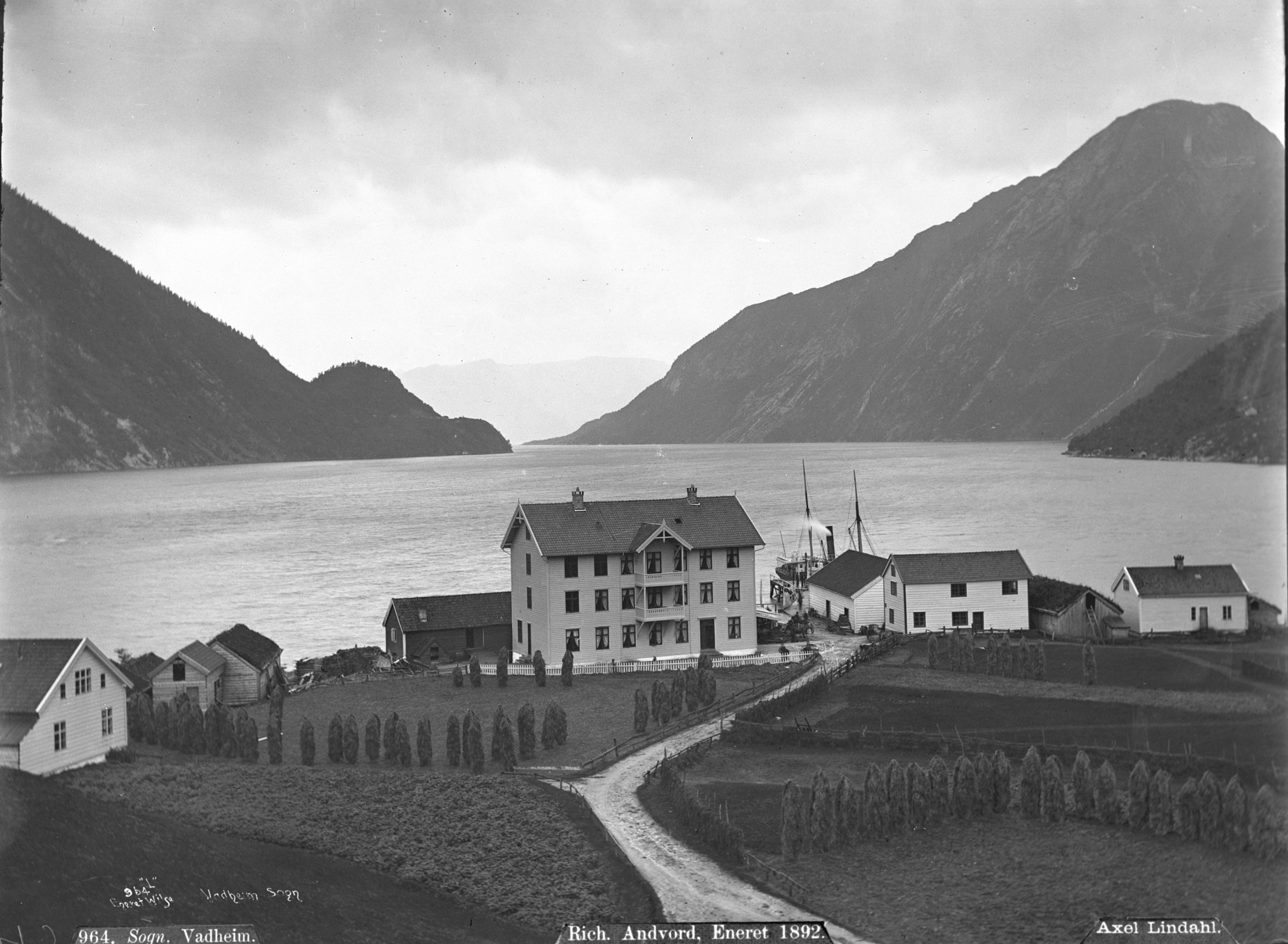
Vadheim Hotel ca 1880-1890

The high mountains surrounding the village has been a source of hydropower for the village. As soon as 1895, a dynamo was installed in the local river. This was most likely the first power plant in Sogn og Fjordane county. In 1906, the Englishman Edgar Ashcroft bought the rights to the waterways and created "Vadheim Elektrochemiske Fabriker" in 1907. The plant produced many different kinds of chemical products until its closure in 2007. The plant helped make Vadheim an industry town.

=== World War I and World War II ===
Vadheim is the resting place for one of the most famous warships of World War I. During that conflict, Germany converted a number of merchant ships to armed surface raiders. These ships cruised the world's shipping lanes and captured/sank Allied shipping. The most famous and successful of these was SMS Möwe. One of the ships she sank was Mount Temple which carried dinosaur fossils destined for the British Museum in London, England. Möwe survived the war. During World War II, under the name Oldenburg, was used in support of the occupation of Norway by Nazi Germany. On 7 April 1945 Bristol Beaufighter aircraft from No. 114 Squadron RAF, No. 455 Squadron RAAF, and No. 489 Squadron RNZAF sank Oldenburg at her moorings following an intense strafing and rocket attack.

Shortly after the end of World War II, the pre-war criminal and wartime resistance fighter Johannes S. Andersen broke into the German barracks in Vadheim and killed two German prisoners-of-war. The incident caused a controversy in Norway after the war when Andersen was charged in court with killing them. It was decided in 1947 that his indictment would be withdrawn.

During World War II, the Nazi occupants constructed different types of fortifications in Vadheim. The roads which run through the village was seen as strategically significant. In Vadheim, multiple fortifications and bunkers are still visible to this day

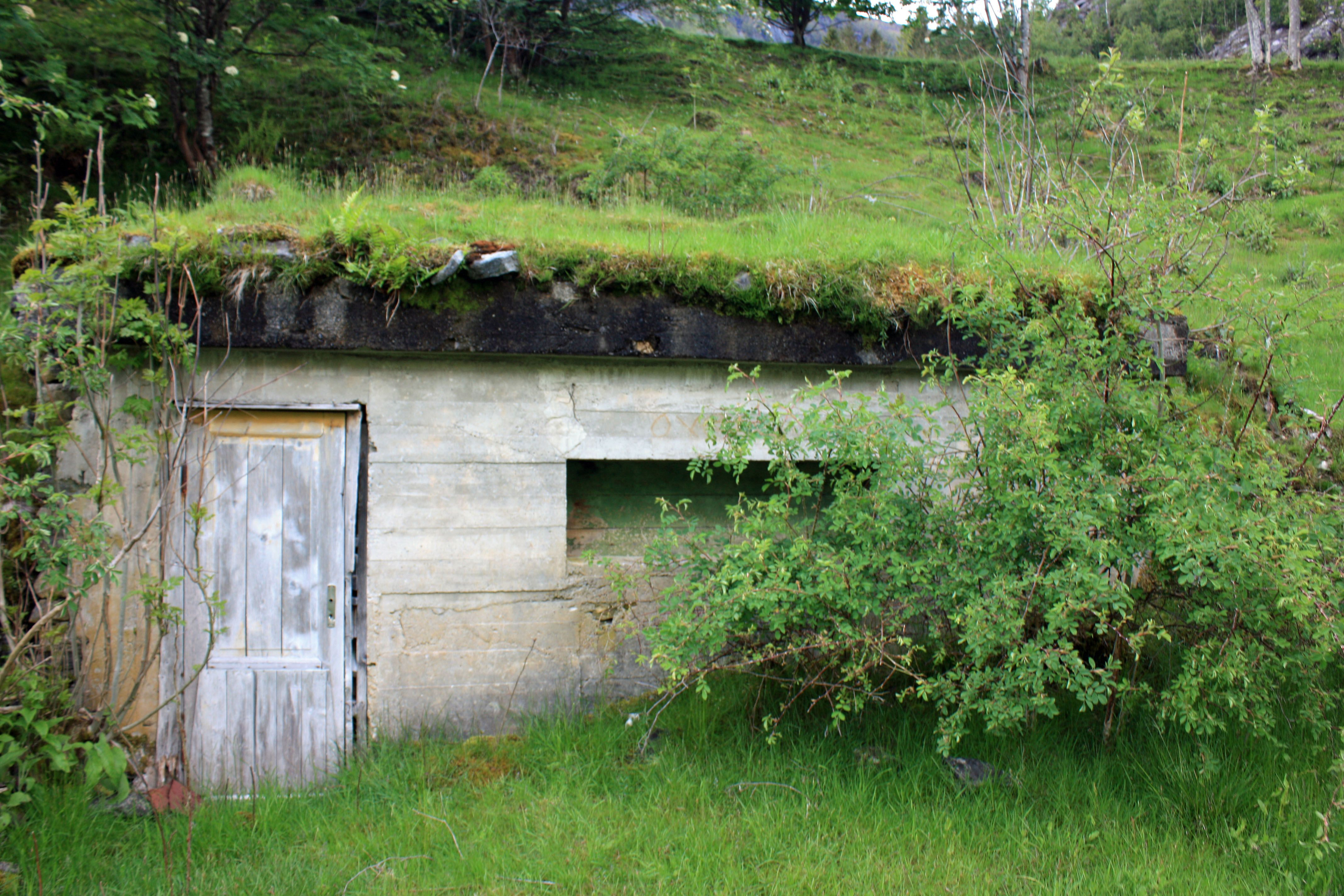
Bunker in Vadheim

== Transportation ==
Vadheim has historically been logistically important in the Ytre Sogn region because of the Ytredalen valley which go northwards towards the old Førde Municipality and Jølster Municipality. The road between Vadheim and Sande is written about first in the 14th century. In 1785 the road through Ytredalen was classified as a horse path. Around the year 1800, a new gravel road for carts was constructed and the road eventually became part of the «Den trondhjemske postveg».

In 1910 the first cars drove through Vadheim. The thoroughfare of tourists and people increased in number after the ship "Alden" came on route in Sogn in 1888.

Near Vadheim is Ytredal Bridge, an 18th-century stone bridge. It is a popular tourist attraction.

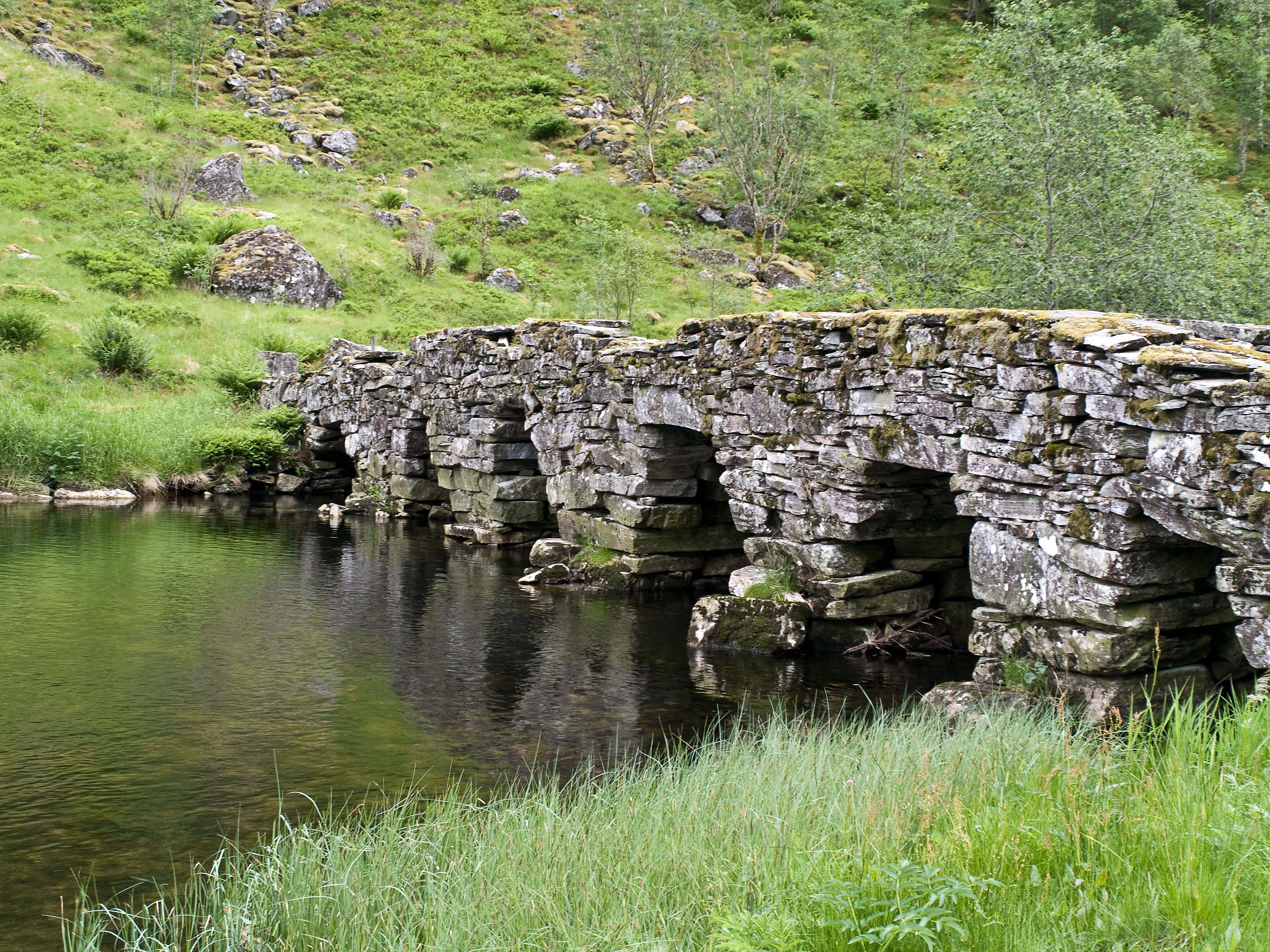
Ytredal Bridge as seen from E39

== Politics ==
Historically, the Labour Party and Centre Party have been popular among the voters in the village. The voter turnout for the Storting election in 2021 and municipal election in 2019 was 79.7% and 64% respectively.

Municipal Election 2019
Party	Outcome
Centre Party	37.4%
Labour Party	35%
Red Party	13.5%
Conservative Party	8.6%
Socialist Left Party	5.5%

Storting Election 2021
Party	Outcome
Labour Party	38.6%
Centre Party	24.1%
Conservative Party	11%
Red Party	9.7%
Progress Party	8.3%
Socialist Left Party	6.2%
Green Party	0.7%
Industry and Business Party	0.7%
Pensioners' Party	0.7%

== Notable people ==
- Even Hovland (born 1989), an association footballer
- Vegar Gjermundstad (born 1990), an association footballer
- Karl Friedrich Kurz (1878–1962), a novelist
