= Høyanger Church =

Church in Vestland, Norway

- Høyanger kyrkje
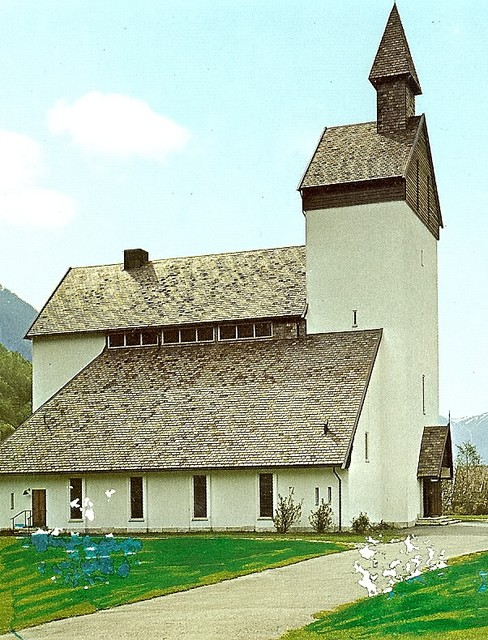
- View of the church
- Høyanger Church
- 61°13′05″N 6°04′40″E
- Location: Høyanger Municipality, Vestland
- Country: Norway
- Denomination: Church of Norway
- Churchmanship: Evangelical Lutheran

History
- Status: Parish church
- Founded: 1960
- Consecrated: 11 Sept 1960

Architecture
- Functional status: Active
- Architect(s): Arnstein Arneberg and Olav Platou
- Architectural type: Long church
- Completed: 1960 (66 years ago)

Specifications
- Capacity: 374
- Materials: Concrete

Administration
- Diocese: Bjørgvin bispedømme
- Deanery: Sunnfjord prosti
- Parish: Høyanger
- Norwegian Cultural Heritage Site
- Type: Church
- Status: Not protected
- ID: 84699

Høyanger Church (Norwegian: Høyanger kyrkje) is a parish church of the Church of Norway in Høyanger Municipality in Vestland county, Norway. It is located in the village of Høyanger. It is the church for the Høyanger parish which is part of the Sunnfjord prosti (deanery) in the Diocese of Bjørgvin. The white, concrete church was built in a long church design in 1960 using plans drawn up by the architects Arnstein Arneberg and Olav Platou. The church seats about 374 people.

== History ==
Plans for a church in the growing community of Høyanger began in 1923, but due to uncertain economic times, the plans were put on hold. In 1938, a plot of land was donated for the church and some initial site work began, but they were again paused upon the outbreak of World War II. After the war, new plans were drawn up by Arnstein Arneberg and Olav S. Platou. The Norsk Aluminium Company (NACO) was responsible for the construction and gave the church for free to the community. The Mayor Albert Hellem thought that the church's gift was the greatest thing that had happened to Høyanger, second only to the actual start of the industry. The church was consecrated on 11 September 1960 by the Bishop Ragnvald Indrebø.

== Media gallery ==
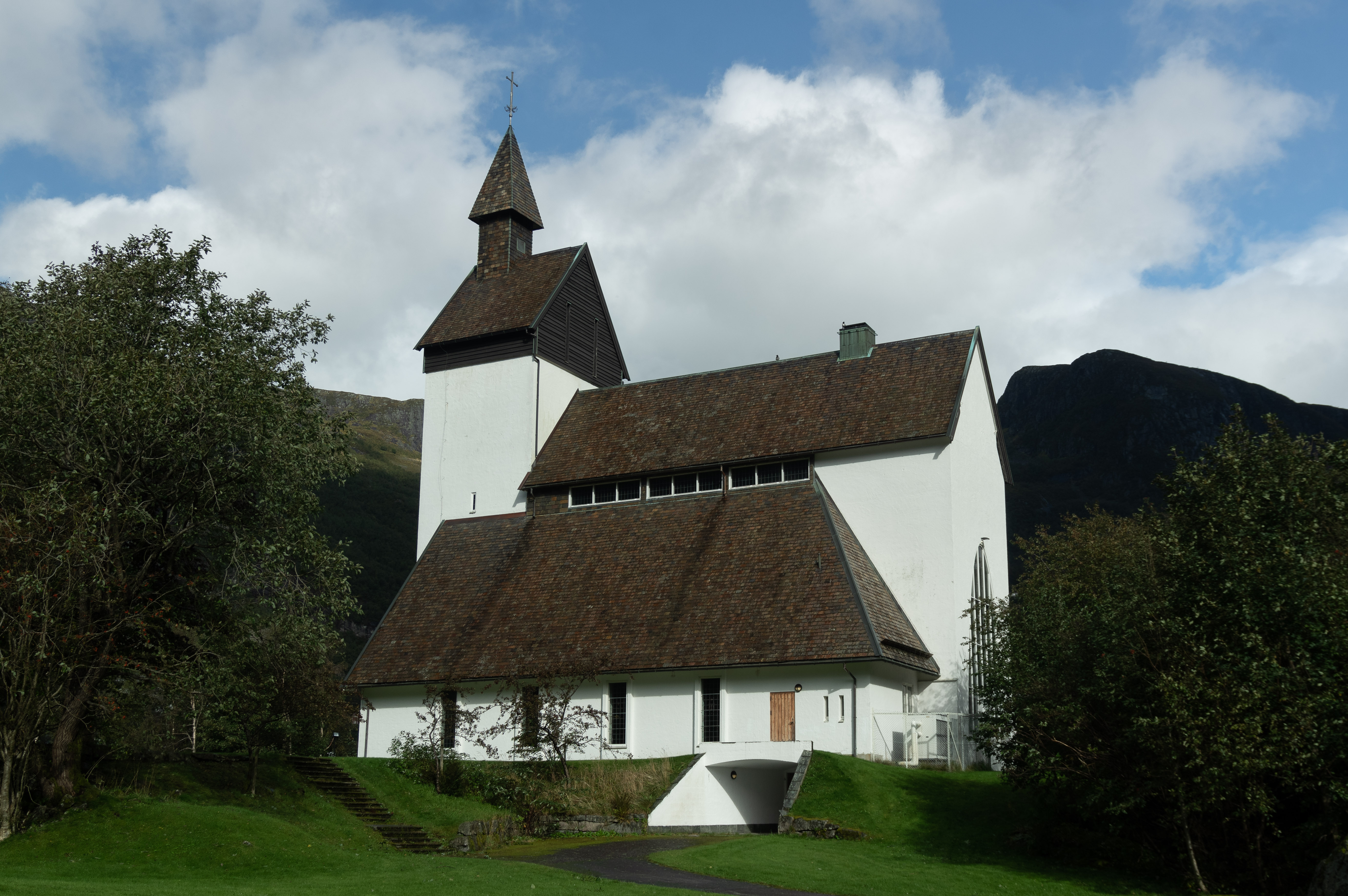

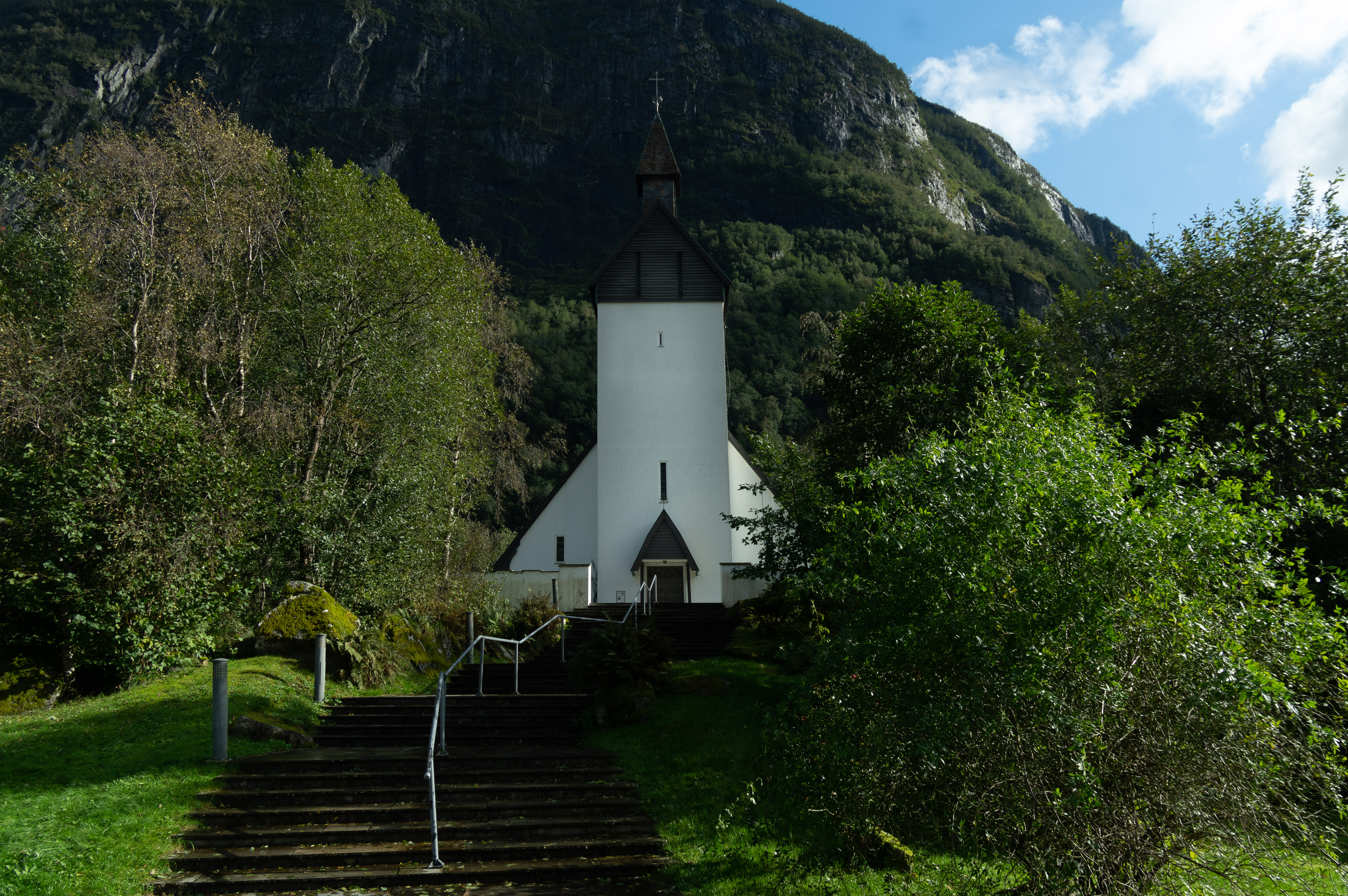

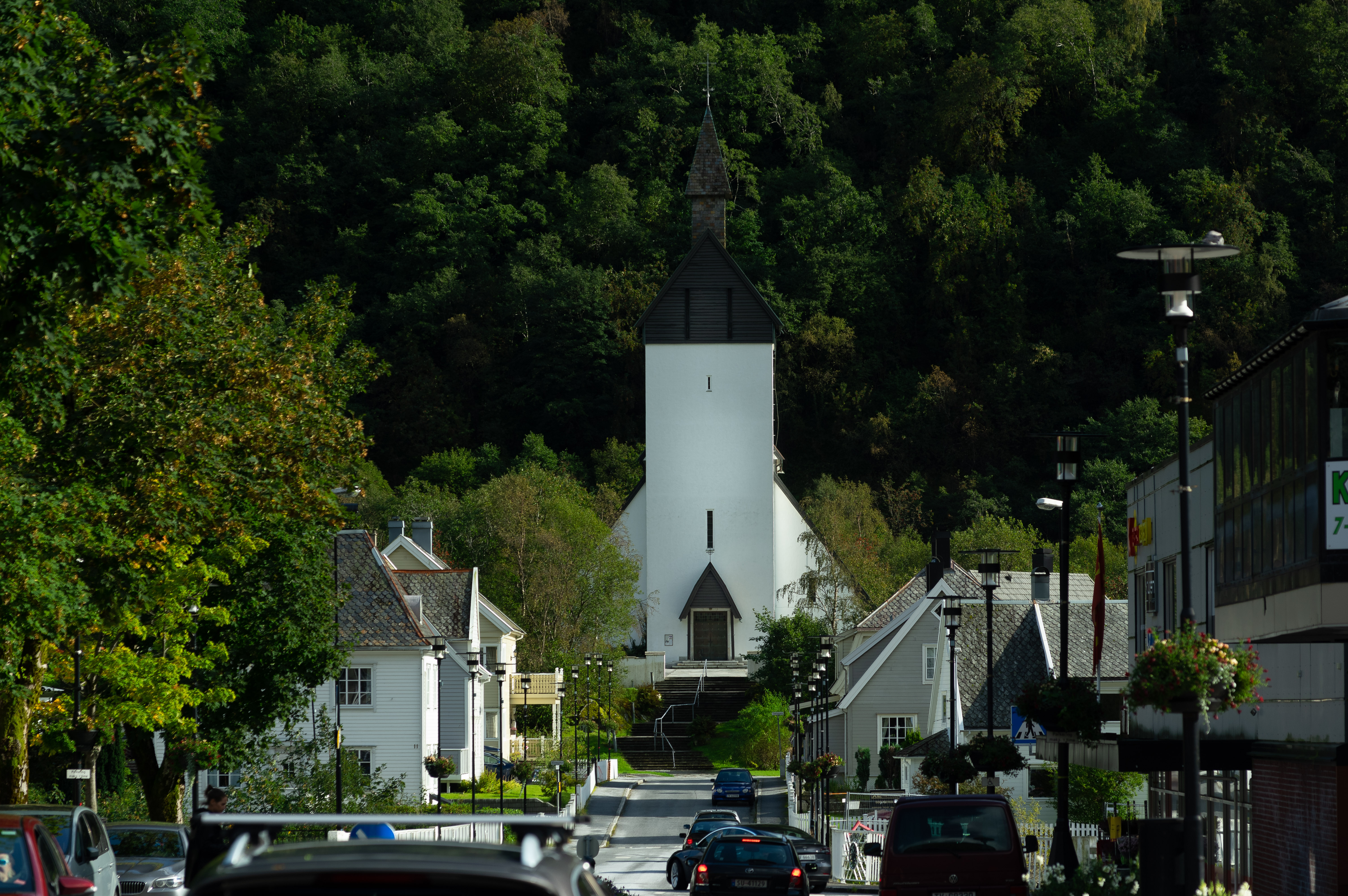

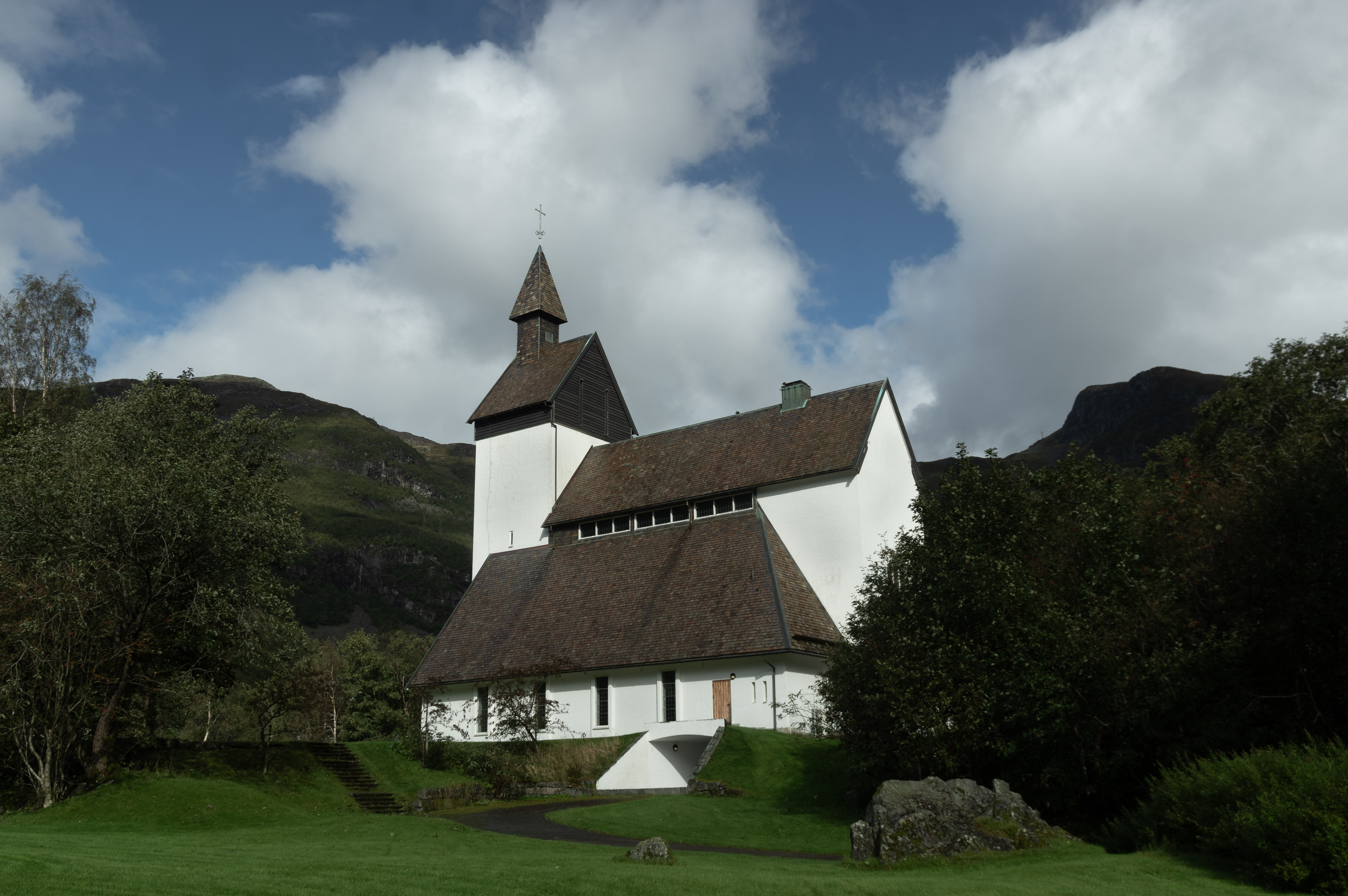

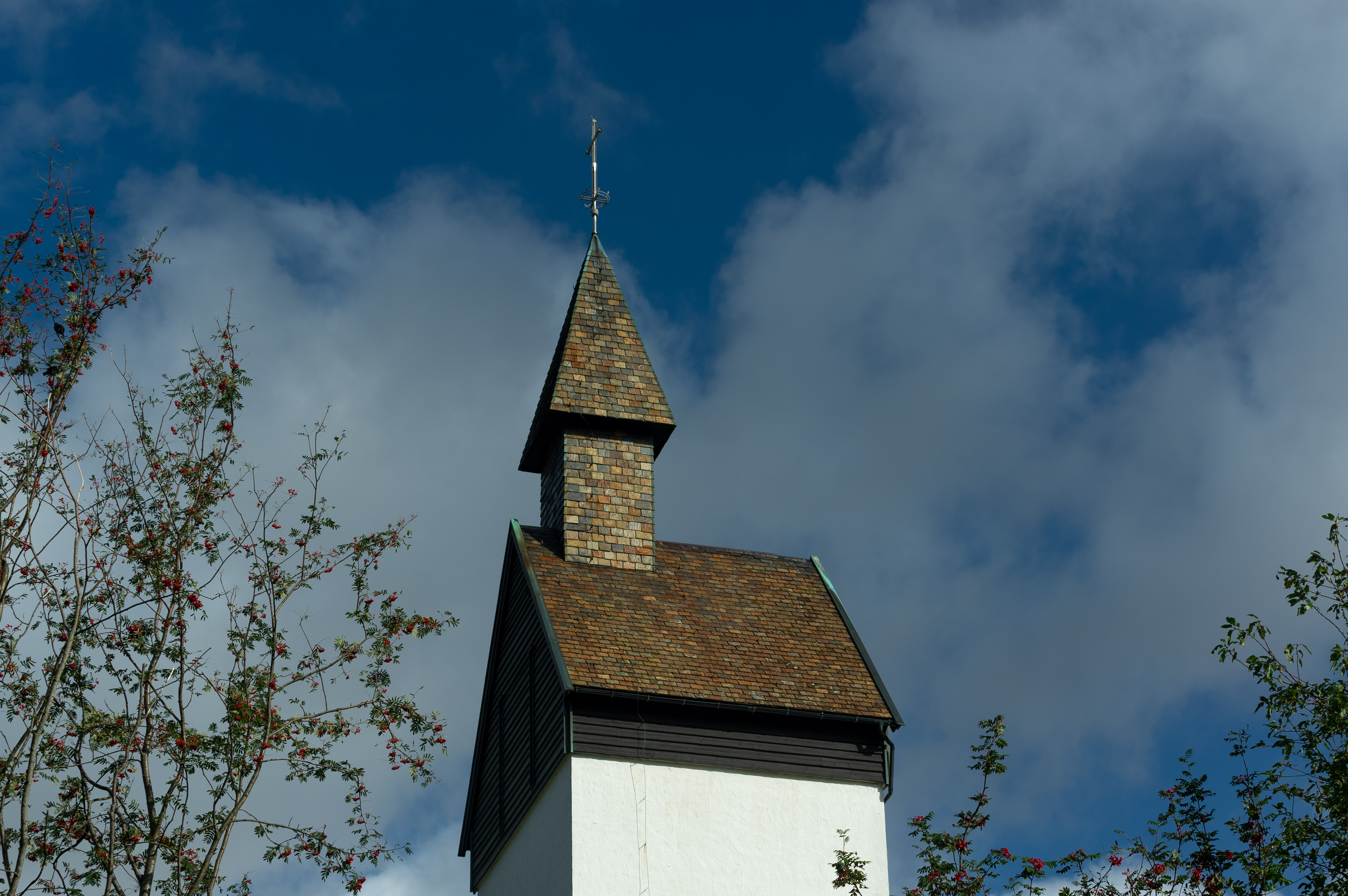

== See also ==
- List of churches in Bjørgvin
