= Høyanger (village) =

Village in Høyanger Municipality, Norway

- Village
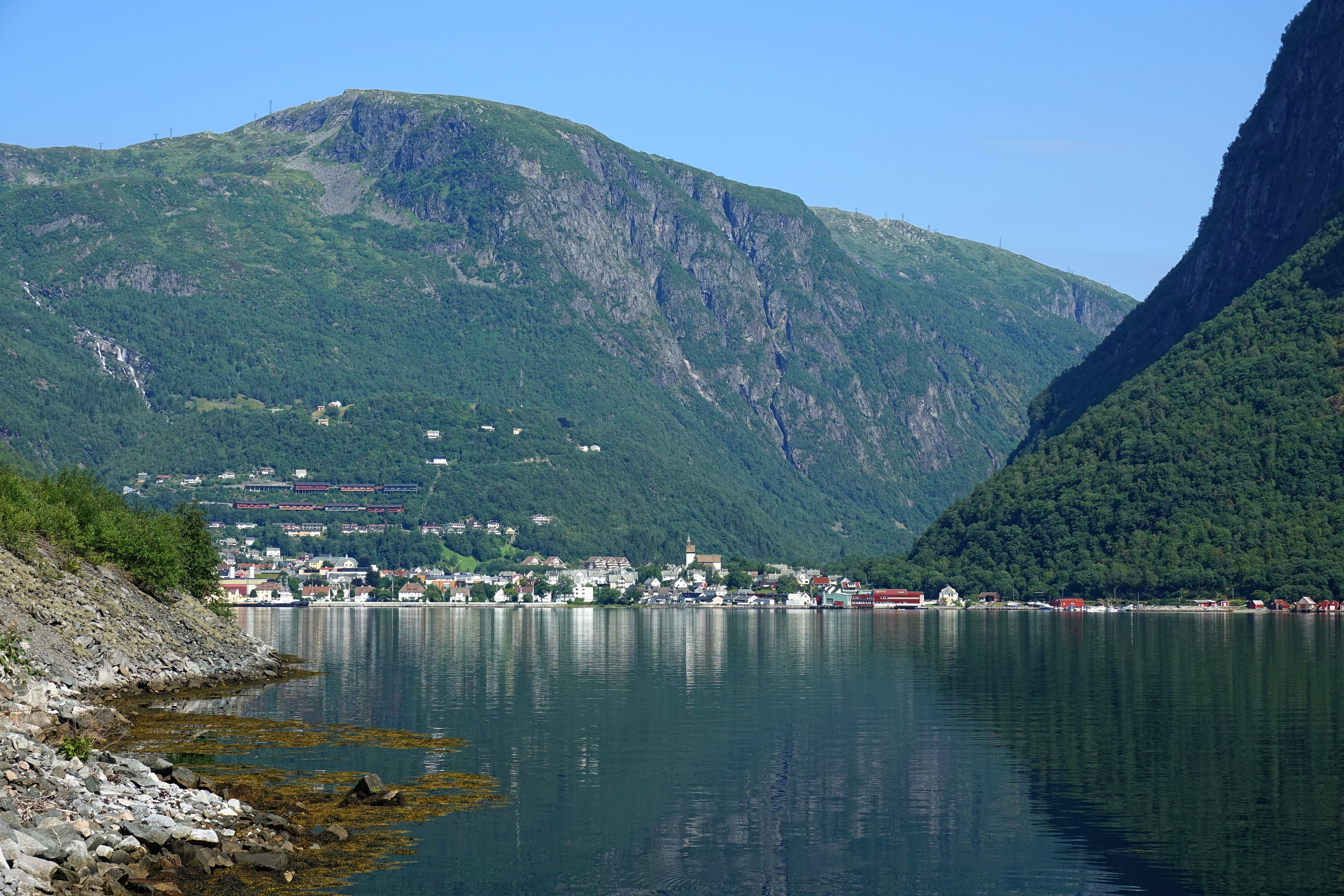
- Høyanger seen from the south
- Interactive map of Høyanger
- Location within Vestland Location within Norway
- Coordinates: 61.22348°N 6.08471°E
- Country: Norway
- Region: Western Norway
- County: Vestland
- District: Sogn
- Municipality: Høyanger Municipality

Area
  - Total: 1.32 km^{2} (0.51 sq mi)
- Elevation: 27 m (89 ft)

Population (2025)
  - Total: 1,903
  - Density: 1,442/km^{2} (3,730/sq mi)
- Time zone: UTC+01:00 (CET)
  - Summer (DST): UTC+02:00 (CEST)
- Post Code: 6993 Høyanger

Høyanger is the administrative centre of Høyanger Municipality in Vestland county, Norway. The industrial village is located in a steep, narrow valley at the head of the Høyangsfjorden, a branch that flows north off the main Sognefjorden. The isolated village is connected to the rest of the country by the Norwegian County Road 55 which enters the village through tunnels which go through the steep mountains on the east and the west sides of the village. The main church for the village is Høyanger Church, which was built in 1960.

The 1.32-square-kilometre (330-acre) village has a population (2024) of 1,903 and a population density of 1,442 inhabitants per square kilometre (3,730/sq mi).

== History ==
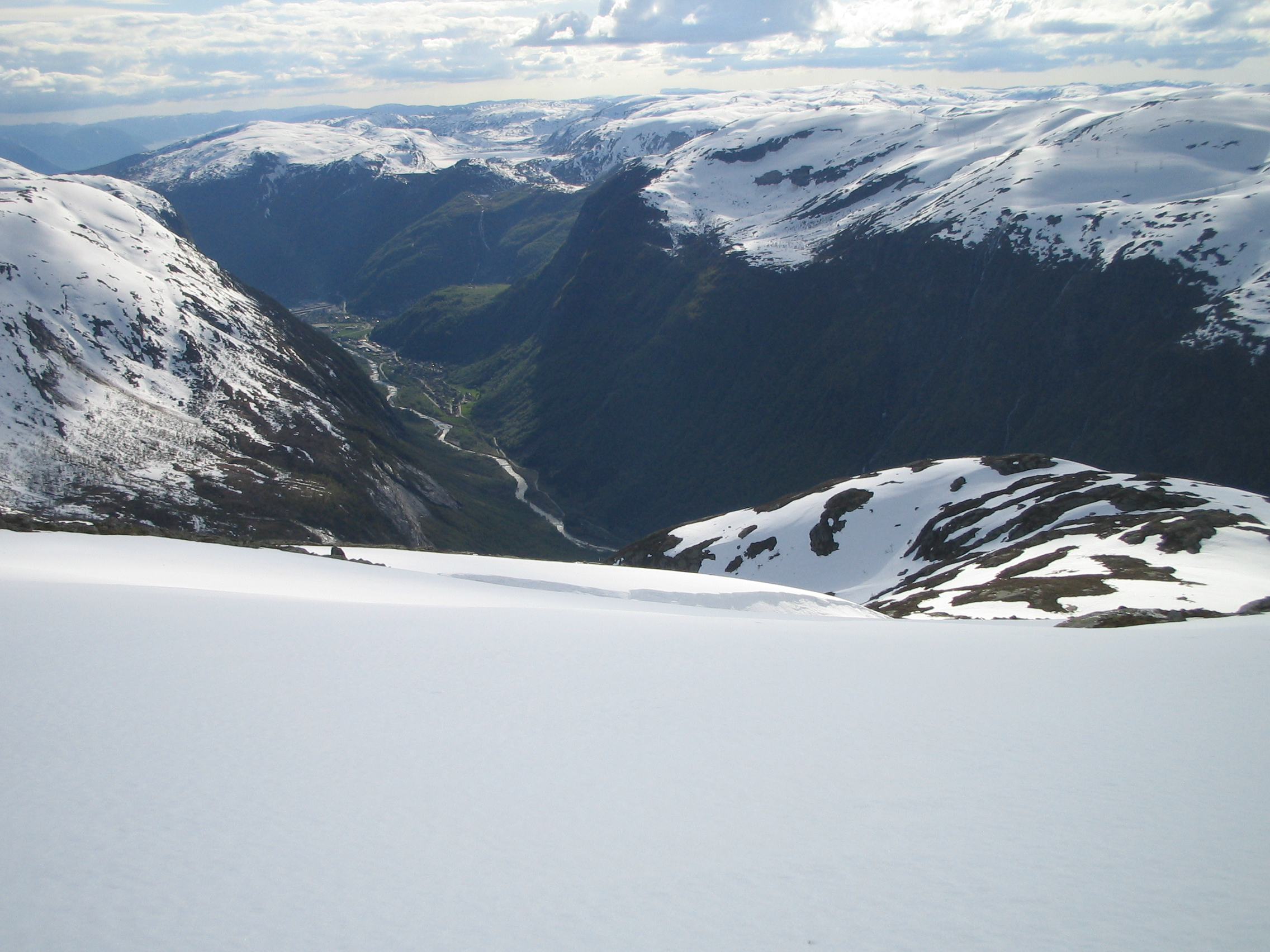
View of the village in the narrow valley (at the top of the picture, looking south)

In 1917, industrial leaders including Sigurd Kloumann and architects Christian Morgenstierne and Arne Eide made plans for a new industrial city at Høyanger. The village was only accessible by boat at that time, and it was located along the largest fjord in Norway, so this site was perfect for transportation and shipping. The village was also chosen due to the local mountains which would provide ample hydroelectricity to power the new industries, the main product of which was aluminum.

There are several industries in Høyanger including the Høyanger metal plant (owned by Norsk Hydro), Norsk Aluminium had a plant there, Aker Kværner runs the maintenance for Norsk Hydro's plant, Bilfelgfabrikken Fundamus builds wheels for Audi cars, and Nyrstar which recycles zinc dust from the steel industry nearby.

=== Population ===
Historical population

| Year | Pop. | ±% p.a. |
|---|---|---|
| 1920 | 953 | — |
| 1930 | 2,218 | +8.81% |
| 1946 | 2,638 | +1.09% |
| 1950 | 2,823 | +1.71% |
| 1960 | 2,850 | +0.10% |
| 1970 | 2,601 | −0.91% |

| Year | Pop. | ±% p.a. |
|---|---|---|
| 1980 | 2,261 | −1.39% |
| 1990 | 2,213 | −0.21% |
| 2000 | 2,258 | +0.20% |
| 2009 | 2,177 | −0.41% |
| 2019 | 2,051 | −0.59% |
