= 1936 in aviation =

This is a list of aviation-related events from 1936:

== Events ==
- The Royal Air Force's first monoplane bomber, the Avro Anson, enters service.
- The German Luftwaffe begins experiments with helle Nachtjagd (abbreviated Henaja) techniques, the operation of night fighters with the aid of searchlights.
- The Soviet aviator Valery Chkalov with two crew members makes a non-stop flight in a Tupolev ANT-25 to Udd Island in the Arctic.
- The Bureau of Air Commerce begins to develop a nationwide air traffic control system in the United States.
- The Curtiss-Wright Corporation reorganizes, amalgamating all manufacturing into the Curtiss-Wright Corporation, which builds aircraft, and the Wright Aeronautical Corporation, which builds aircraft engines.

=== January ===
- January 10 – The civil transport version of the Heinkel He 111 bomber is revealed in public for the first time at Berlin′s Tempelhof airport. Named Dresden, the He 111 V4 carries registration D-AHAO.
- January 12 – In the Second Italo-Abyssinian War, aircraft of the Italian Royal Air Force (Regia Aeronautica) begin the Battle of Genale Doria by dropping two tons (1,814 kg) of mustard gas on Ethiopian positions.
- January 13–14 – Howard Hughes makes a record-breaking sprint across the United States from Burbank, California to Newark, New Jersey in 9 hours 26 minutes 10 seconds at an average speed of 259 mph (417 km/h). He uses a Northrop Gamma specially fitted with a 1,000-hp (747-kW) Wright SR-1820-G2 radial engine.
- January 14 – Bound for Little Rock, Arkansas, American Airlines Flight 1 — the Douglas DC-2-120 Southerner — crashes into a swamp near Goodwin, Arkansas, 14 minutes after takeoff from Memphis, Tennessee, killing all 17 people on board.
- January 16 – Searchers find American polar explorer Lincoln Ellsworth and his pilot, Herbert Hollick-Kenyon, alive and well at the abandoned base at Little America on the Ross Ice Shelf in Antarctica. They had arrived there on 15 December 1935 after completing the first flight across Antarctica in the Northrop Gamma aircraft Polar Star, but had been unable to report their arrival due to a faulty radio.
- January 17 – The United States Army Air Corps orders 13 Boeing Y1B-17 Flying Fortresses, previously known by the manufacturer's designation, Model 299.
- January 20 – Italian troops take the Ethiopian town of Negele Boran without firing a shot. Its inhabitants have all fled after Italian aircraft drop 40 tons (36,288 kg) of bombs on the town during the Battle of Genale Doria.
- January 22 – Italian aircraft play a decisive role in the First Battle of Tembien, dropping mustard gas to defeat a promising offensive by Ethiopian forces.

=== February ===
- British Marine Aircraft Ltd. is established at Hamble, Hampshire to produce Sikorsky S-42-A flying boats under licence in the United Kingdom but nothing comes of it. The company subsequently will become Folland Aircraft Limited.
- Flying an Aeronca C-3, Helen Richey sets an international women's speed record for light planes, averaging 73 mph (117 km/h) during a 51-minute flight covering 100 km (62 mi).
- February 2 – Karl Lange makes a daring landing on the ice of Chesapeake Bay in the Goodyear Blimp Enterprise as part of a United States Army Air Corps operation to bring supplies by air to the residents of Virginia′s Tangier Island, who face starvation after a severe winter storm. Ships have been unable to reach the island because of ice in the bay.
- February 9 – After a one-hour, 54-mile (87-km) flight from Langley Field, Virginia, a U.S. Army Air Corps 49th Bomb Squadron Keystone B-6A bomber drops 1,000 pounds (450 kg) of supplies in 50-pound (23 kg) parcels to the residents of Tangier Island, flying at an altitude of not more than 10 feet (3.0 meters).
- February 10 – During the morning, two U.S. Army Air Corps 49th Bomb Squadron B-6A bombers make flights to drop supplies at very low altitudes at Tangier Island, and a third B-6A drops supplies at nearby Smith Island, Maryland. Two B-6As drop additional supplies at Tangier Island during the afternoon. Based on the success of the supply flights of February 9 and 10, the 49th Bomb Squadron will fly an additional 13 flights to drop supplies to the islands using Martin B-10B bombers.
- February 13 – Imperial Airways commences airmail services to West Africa.
- February 15 – Italian aircraft based at nearby Mek'ele, Ethiopia, maintain at least 12 aircraft over the battlefield all day during the Battle of Amba Aradam against Ethiopian troops. It is a forerunner of the World War II "cab rank" technique of keeping airborne aircraft continually on call over a battlefield to bomb enemy positions when needed.
- February 16–19 – On February 16, Marshal Pietro Badoglio orders Italian ground forces not to pursue Ethiopian forces after they begin to retreat from Amba Aradam and assigns the task of exploitation of Italy's victory to the Italian Royal Air Force (Regia Aeronautica), a novel task for an air force. Italian aircraft drop 40 tons (36,288 kg) of bombs on retreating Ethiopian forces over the last four days of the battle with devastating effect, and on February 19 a strafing aircraft mortally wounds the Ethiopian military leader Ras Mulugeta Yeggazu, who dies eight days later.
- February 17 – The Australian airline Ansett Airways (the future Ansett Australia) begins flight operations. Its first flight is from Hamilton Airport in Victoria to Melbourne, using a Fokker Universal.
- February 19 – Controversial United States Army airpower advocate Billy Mitchell dies. He had resigned from the United States Army Air Service in February 1926.
- February 27 – During the Second Battle of Tembien, Italian aircraft drop 200 tons (181 tonnes/metric tons) of high-explosive bombs on forming-up areas for Ethiopian troops and kill many Ethiopians fleeing the battlefield as they ford the Takkaze River.

=== March ===
- The National Socialist German Workers Party requisitions the dirigibles Graf Zeppelin and Hindenburg to conduct leaflet-dropping propaganda flights over Germany to garner support for Hitler's planned remilitarization of the Rhineland.
- March 3–4 – Italian aircraft attack Ethiopian ground forces as they retreat across the Takkaze River, dropping mustard gas and 80 tons (72.6 tonnes/metric tons) of high-explosive and incendiary bombs. Thousands of Ethiopian troops are killed.
- March 23 – Imperial Airways begins scheduled flights between Hong Kong and Malaysia.
- March 26 – Adolf II, Prince of Schaumburg-Lippe, and his wife are killed in a plane crash at Zumpango, Mexico.
- March 28 – The U.S. National Advisory Committee for Aeronautics begins operational use of newly constructed 8-foot- (2.4-meter-) high speed tunnel (8-Foot HST) at the Langley Memorial Aeronautical Laboratory, Langley, Virginia.
- March 31 – During the Battle of Maychew, Italian aircraft bomb Ethiopian troops heavily, helping to blunt a major Ethiopian attack.

=== April ===
- The German Luftwaffe staff holds a war game which finds that German air rearmament thus far has been inadequate and that the Luftwaffe is inferior to the French Air Force.
- April 4 – Italian aircraft drop mustard gas and 73 tons (66.2 tonnes/metric tons) of high-explosive bombs on a force of 20,000 Ethiopian troops retreating across the plain of Lake Ashangi, killing thousands.
- April 7 – Transcontinental and Western Airways Flight 1, a Douglas DC-2, crashes into Cheat Mountain near Uniontown, Pennsylvania, while on approach to Allegheny County Airport in Pittsburgh, Pennsylvania, killing 12 of the 14 people on board.
- April 15 – Aer Lingus, the Republic of Ireland's, national airline, is founded. It will begin flight operations in May.
- April 19 – Italian aircraft bomb Ethiopian forces attacking Italian troops at Birkut.

=== May ===
- Flying a light plane borrowed from sportsman Ben King, Helen Richey sets an international altitude record for aircraft weighing under 200 kg (440 lb), reaching 18,448 feet (5,623 m) during a flight from Congressional Airport in Rockville, Maryland, to New Market, Virginia.
- May 4–7 – Amy Johnson sets a new England-South Africa speed record of 3 days 6 hours 26 minutes in a Percival Gull Six.
- May 5 – The Second Italo-Abyssinian War ends in an Italian conquest of Ethiopia as Italian forces enter Addis Ababa. Facing no opposition, the Italian Royal Air Force (Regia Aeronautica) has played a decisive role in Italy's victory in the eight-month war, but has engaged in a brutal campaign – in which Benito Mussolini's sons Vittorio and Bruno and son-in-law Count Ciano voluntarily participate – of indiscriminate terror bombing and widespread use of mustard gas.
- May 27 – Aer Lingus, the Republic of Ireland's national airline, begins flight operations. Its first flight is by the de Havilland 84 Dragon Iolar (registration EI-ABI) from Baldonnel Airfield in Dublin, Ireland, to Bristol (Whitchurch) Airport in England.

=== June ===
- June 3 – Generalleutnant Walther Wever, the first chief-of-staff of the restored German Luftwaffe and the main proponent for the new force to have the aircraft to perform strategic bombing, dies along with his flight engineer when the Heinkel He 70 he is piloting crashes on takeoff at Dresden, Germany from its gust locks remaining in place. Ironically, the very same day, the German RLM proposes the Bomber A specification and aircraft design competition, which leads directly to the beginnings of the He 177 Greif German heavy bomber project over a year later.
- June 10 – First timetabled service to Barra Airport (Scotland), on Traigh Mhòr beach, offered by Northern & Scottish Airways. The airport is officially licensed on August 7.
- June 16
  - The Norwegian Air Lines Junkers Ju 52 floatplane Havørn crashes into the mountain Lihesten in Hyllestad Municipality, Norway, killing all seven people on board. It is the first fatal aviation accident in Norway.
  - The United States Coast Guard Cutter George W. Campbell is the first Treasury-class cutter cutter commissioned. The Treasury-class cutters are the first United States Coast Guard ships capable of carrying an airplane (a Grumman J2F Duck, Curtiss SOC-4, or Waco J2W-1 seaplane).
- June 24 – Jean Piccard flies an unmanned transparent cellophane balloon designed by his students at the University of Minnesota for flights in the stratosphere at altitudes of 10 to 14 miles (16 to 23 km). The balloon is 25 feet (7.6 meters) tall and is made of sixteen 33-foot-long (10-meter-long) tapered gores held together by a revolutionary new product: one-inch (2.54-cm) 3M Scotch transparent tape. On its first flight, the balloon floats at an altitude of 50,000 feet (15,000 meters) and in 10 hours travels over 600 miles (970 km) to a point near Huntsville, Arkansas.
- June 26 – Piloted by Ewald Rohlfs, the world's first practical, fully controllable helicopter, the German Focke-Wulf Fw 61, makes its first free flight.
- June 26–27 (overnight) – An aerial expedition in two Caproni Ca.133 bombers and an IMAM Ro.1 reconnaissance aircraft by Italian Royal Air Force Air Marshal Vincenzo Magliocco, Deputy Viceroy of Ethiopia, from Addis Ababa to contact Oromo leaders in southwestern Ethiopia about possible cooperation with Italy against Ethiopian guerrilla forces ends in disaster on its first night when Ethiopian guerrillas attack the Italians in their makeshift camp around their aircraft at the airfield at Nekemte. The guerillas burn all three aircraft and kill 12 of the 13 Italians, including Magliocco. The Italians later convert one of the wrecked Ca.133s into a war memorial.
- June 27 – The Luftwaffe's chief of procurement Ernst Udet – the second-ranking German ace of World War I and a famous stunt pilot – takes the prototype of the Heinkel He 118 dive bomber up for a test flight, but mismanages propeller pitch settings during a dive, causing the plane to crash. Udet parachutes to safety, but the He 118 is destroyed.
- June 30 – The United States Senate's Copeland Committee releases its preliminary report, which harshly criticizes the Bureau of Air Commerce for providing insufficient funding for and maintenance of airway navigation aids in the United States.

=== July ===
- July 14 – The British Royal Air Force is re-organised on functional grounds and RAF Fighter Command, RAF Bomber Command, RAF Coastal Command, and RAF Training Command are established.
- July 17
  - The Spanish Civil War breaks out, and the Republican (loyalist) and Nationalist (rebel) factions seize portions of the Spanish Air Force and of the aviation force of the Spanish Republican Navy. The Republicans end up with about 200 serviceable aircraft – including all the fighters – and 150 pilots, which form the basis of their Spanish Republican Air Force, while the Nationalists control less than 100 serviceable aircraft and 90 pilots, which form the basis for their National Aviation.
  - The Fairey Swordfish makes its maiden flight.
- July 20 – One of the four leaders of the Nationalist uprising in Spain, General José Sanjurjo y Sacanell, dies in the crash on takeoff at Estoril, Portugal, of a light plane piloted by Juan Antonio Ansaldo while attempting to fly to Spain. He had insisted on overloading the plane with baggage so as to have the proper clothes to wear and on flying with Ansaldo instead of in a larger plane in order to make the flight with a "daring aviator." Ansaldo survives.
- July 29 – Germany and Italy become the first countries to provide aircraft for service in the Spanish Civil War, when 10 German Junkers Ju 52 transports land in Spanish Morocco for service with the Nationalist faction and nine Italian Savoia-Marchetti SM.81 bombers arrive in Spain for Nationalist service; three other SM.81s crash during the flight to Spain.
- July 29–August 5 – Ten, later increased to twenty, German Junkers Ju 52s ferry 1,500 Spanish Nationalist troops from Spanish Morocco to Spain in the world's first major military airlift.
- July 31 – The Jersey Airways Saro A.19 Cloud amphibian airliner Cloud of Iona (registered G-ABXW) disappears during a stormy evening on a flight from Guernsey to Jersey in the Channel Islands with the loss of all ten people on board. An investigation determines that the plane had lost engine power, landed on the sea, and been swamped by waves.
- July 31–August 8 – France becomes the first country to supply aircraft to the Republican faction in Spain, delivering 70 planes, including Bloch MB.200s, Potez 54s, and Dewoitine D.371s.

=== August ===
- Germany begins sending four transport flights to Spain per week to support the Spanish Nationalist faction, It will continue to do so for over two years.
- August 1 – Ten more German Junkers Ju 52 transports and six Heinkel He 51 fighters arrive at Cádiz for service with the Spanish Nationalist faction.
- August 4 – A demonstration of gliding at the 1936 Summer Olympics takes place at Berlin-Staaken airfield. Fourteen pilots from seven countries take part.
- August 5
  - Five Italian Savoia-Marchetti SM.81 bombers are among aircraft covering a convoy of merchant ships carrying 3,000 Nationalist soldiers and their equipment from Spanish Morocco to Spain.
  - Bound for Chicago, Illinois, Chicago and Southern Air Lines Flight 4 — the Lockheed Model 10 Electra City of Memphis — crashes in a farm field near the Missouri River about five minutes after takeoff from Lambert-St. Louis International Airport, killing all eight people — six passengers and two crew members — aboard. Vernon Omlie — who had performed as a noted barnstorming team with his wife, the aviation pioneer Phoebe Omlie — is among the dead.
- August 6 – German Junkers Ju 52 transports begin a schedule of airlifting 500 Nationalist troops a day from Spanish Morocco to Spain. Nationalist leader Francisco Franco himself makes the flight on August 6.
- August 9 – Six aircraft support a Republican seizure of Ibiza.
- August 10 – A Nationalist ground column under Colonel Juan Yagüe y Blanco captures Mérida, Spain, after advancing 200 miles (322 km) in less than a week. Nine German Junkers Ju 52s and eight Italian Savoia-Marchetti SM.81s have given the column local air superiority, while a civilian aeroclub from Seville has provided aerial reconnaissance and in one instance forced Republican militiamen to abandon their positions by dropping melons on them.
- August 13 – A Nationalist air raid off Málaga damages the Republican battleship Jaime I.
- August 16 – Seaplanes from Barcelona support a Republican landing on Mallorca. In reaction, three Italian Savoia-Marchetti SM.81 bombers, three Italian Fiat CR.32 fighters, and various Spanish Nationalist aircraft are sent to be based on the island. The presence of the CR.32s precludes any further Republican air attacks on Mallorca.
- August 23 – Nationalist aircraft bomb the airport at Getafe, Spain.
- August 25 – Nationalist aircraft bomb Cuatro Vientos Airport in Madrid, Spain.
- August 27–29 – German Junkers Ju 52s supporting the Nationalists bomb Madrid. They damage the Ministry of War on August 29. It is the first terror bombing of a large city since World War I.

=== September ===
- The Uruguayan airline PLUNA is founded. It will begin flight operations in November.
- September 2 – Flying the Lady Peace, a Vultee V-1A filled with 41,000 ping pong balls to help it remain afloat if it is forced down at sea, Dick Merrill and Harry Richman begin the first transatlantic round trip by air, taking off from Floyd Bennett Field in New York City on what becomes known as the "Ping Pong Flight." They arrive at Llandeilo, Wales, 18 hours 36 minutes later, setting a new record for the fastest transatlantic crossing. The following day, they fly on to London's Croydon Airport. They will fly the return leg on September 14.
- September 3 – Nationalist aircraft on Mallorca support a counteroffensive against Republican invaders, demoralizing them and sparking a precipitous Republican retreat from the island, which will become an important Nationalist base for the remainder of the Spanish Civil War.
- September 4–5 – English-born aviator Beryl Markham makes the first east-to-west solo transatlantic flight by a woman, in her Percival Vega Gull The Messenger, from RAF Abingdon at Abingdon-on-Thames in England to Baleine Cove on Cape Breton Island in Nova Scotia, Canada, where engine failure forces her to crash-land. She also becomes the first person to make a non-stop east-to-west solo transatlantic flight to North America originating in England. The 2,612-mile (4,206-km) flight takes her 21 hours 35 minutes at an average speed of 121 miles per hour (195 kilometres per hour)).
- September 5 – The Bendix Trophy race from Floyd Bennett Field in Brooklyn, New York, to Mines Field in Los Angeles, California, takes place, with nine men and six women competing. The team of Louise Thaden and Blanche Noyes wins in a Beechcraft C-17 Staggerwing, Laura Ingalls places second flying a Lockheed Orion 9D Special, and the team of Amelia Earhart and Helen Richey finishes fifth in a Lockheed 10E Electra. Joe Jacobson's Northrop Gamma 2A catches fire and crashes near Stafford, Kansas, but he parachutes to safety.
- September 6 – Italian aircraft arriving in Mallorca establish a Nationalist bombing capability against Republican Spain.
- September 11 – Tupolev TB-3-4AM-34FRN with A. B. Yumashev of the Soviet Union at the controls sets a payload-to-altitude record of 5,000 kg (11,000 lb) to 8,116 meters (26,627 feet).
- September 14 – Dick Merrill and Harry Richman fly the return leg of the "Ping Pong Flight" begun on September 2, taking off from Southport, England, in the Vultee V-1A Lady Peace, filled with 41,000 ping pong balls to keep it afloat if it is forced down in the ocean. After Richman panics during a storm and dumps 500 gallons of fuel, leaving then unable to reach New York City, Merrill safely makes a forced landing later in the day in a soft bog at Musgrave Harbour in the Dominion of Newfoundland. After minor repairs and refueling, they fly on to New York City on September 21, completing the first transatlantic round trip by air in history.
- September 16 – A Tupolev TB-3-4AM-34FRN with A. B. Yumashev at the controls sets a payload-to-altitude record of 10,000 kg (22,000 lb) to 6,605 meters (21,670 feet).
- September 19 – Tom Campbell Black is killed while waiting to take off at Speke Airport in Liverpool, England, when a Royal Air Force Hawker Hart light bomber of No. 611 Squadron taxiing after landing collides with his Percival Mew Gull (registration G-AEKL).
- September 20 – A Tupolev TB-3-4AM-34FRN with A. B. Yumashev at the controls set a payload-to-altitude record of 12,000 kg (26,000 lb) to 2,700 meters (8,900 feet).
- September 28 – Flying the Bristol Type 138A, Royal Air Force Squadron Leader F. R. D. Swain takes off from Farnborough, England, and sets a Fédération Aéronautique Internationale-homologated world altitude record of 15,230 meters (49,970 feet). He lands at Netheravon.
- September 30 – The German airlift of Spanish Nationalist troops from Spanish Morocco to Spain ends after 677 flights carrying 12,000 men in August and September. The airlift will be one of the most decisive factors in the eventual Nationalist victory in the Spanish Civil War.

=== October ===
- October 1 – C. W. A. Scott and Giles Guthrie win the Schlesinger Race from England to Johannesburg, South Africa, flying Vega Gull G-AEKE landing at Rand Airport on 1 October 1936. The aircraft left Portsmouth 52 hours 56 minutes 48 seconds earlier. Out of the original 14 entries to the race Scott and Guthrie are the only ones to finish, winning the 10,000 pounds prize money.
- October 12 – Nationalist aircraft sink the Republican submarine B-5 off the coast of Spain near Málaga.
- October 19 – H. R. Ekins, reporter for the New York World-Telegram, wins a race to travel around the world on commercial airline flights, beating Dorothy Kilgallen of the New York Journal and Leo Kieran of The New York Times. The flight takes 18 ½ days.
- October 21 – Pan American Airways initiates the first transpacific airline service for paying passengers with six-day-a-week passenger service between San Francisco, California, and Manila in the Philippine Islands via Honolulu, Hawaii.
- October 25 – The United States Navy's first aircraft carrier, USS Langley (CV-1), is decommissioned for conversion into a seaplane tender, redesignated AV-3.
- October 28 – Tupolev TB-3-4AM-34FRN with A. B. Yumashev of the Soviet Union at the controls sets a payload-to-altitude record of 5,000 kg (11,000 lb) to 8,980 meters (29,460 feet).
- October 29 – Soviet aircraft appear in combat for the first time in the Spanish Civil War as Alcantarilla-based Tupolev SB-2 bombers with Soviet pilots and Spanish bombardiers and gunners bomb Seville in support of Republican forces. On the same day, Nationalist forces begin a heavy bombing campaign against Madrid.

=== November ===
- November 1 – Central Airlines and Pennsylvania Airlines merge to form Pennsylvania Central Airlines.
- November 3 – New Soviet Polikarpov I-15 and I-16 fighters fly their first missions of the Spanish Civil War, supporting Republican forces. Their superior performance will allow the Republican side to gain air superiority over Nationalist forces.
- November 4 – Soviet fighters see combat for the first time in the Spanish Civil War, when Polikarpov I-15s led by Pavel Rychagov disperse a squadron of Fiat CR.32 fighters escorting Junkers Ju 52 bombers over Madrid, shooting two CR.32s and two Ju 52s, and forcing a third Ju 52 and a Heinkel two-seater aircraft to crash-land without loss to themselves. Over the next two days, the Soviet pilots claim 12 more aerial victories in exchange for the loss of two I-15s.
- November 6 – The German Luftwaffe's Condor Legion, a force of about 100 aircraft, begins to depart Germany for Seville, Spain, to support Nationalist forces in the Spanish Civil War.
- November 8–23 – Soviet aircraft play an important role in the Republican defense of Madrid.
- November 12 – The Congress of the Philippines passes the Civil Aviation Law of the Philippines, creating the country's Bureau of Aeronautics.
- November 15–17 – The German Condor Legion sees its first action of the Spanish Civil War, supporting Nationalist forces fighting to take Madrid.
- November 16 – Flying a Polikarpov I-15 fighter, future Soviet Air Forces ace Pavel Rychagov is shot down during a dogfight with Fiat CR.32s over Madrid. He survives and returns to duty.
- November 19 – The Uruguayan airline PLUNA begins flight operations.
- November 19–22 – Curious to see the reaction of a civilian population to an attempt to systematically destroy its city by bombing, officers of the German Condor Legion supporting Francisco Franco's desire to bomb Madrid into surrendering oversee a bombing campaign by German Junker Ju 52s and Italian Savoia-Marchetti SM.81s that kills 150 people in the city. It is the heaviest bombing ever carried out against a city up to that time.
- November 28 – Thus far in the Spanish Civil War, Italy has sent about 24 Fiat CR.32 fighters, 19 Savoia-Marchetti SM.81 bombers, and some IMAM Ro.37 reconnaissance aircraft to support the Nationalists.

=== December ===
- The British Empire's Empire Air Mail Scheme, in which Imperial Airways carries all first-class mail by air, begins its first service, flying from Alexandria, Egypt.
- December 6 – Nationalist aircraft bomb Barcelona, Spain.
- December 7 – The Latécoère 300 flying boat Croix du Sud ("Southern Cross") disappears at sea after its pilot, Jean Mermoz, reports engine trouble. The plane's entire crew is lost without trace.
- December 8 – Spanish Republican pilots flying Soviet-made fighters shoot down a plane carrying International Red Cross envoy Georges Henny over northern Spain while Henny is carrying a report on the Paracuellos massacre of Nationalists by Republicans that he intends to present to the League of Nations. The crash badly injures Henny, preventing his report to the League, and fatally injures the French Paris Soir correspondent Louis Delaprée.
- December 9 – A Dutch KLM Douglas DC-2 airliner crashes shortly after takeoff from Croydon Airfield in England. Among the dead are Juan de la Cierva y Cordoniu, inventor of the autogyro, and the Swedish admiral, industrialist, and politician Arvid Lindman.
- December 12 – Seven Royal Air Force Handley Page Heyford bombers of No. 102 Squadron flying from RAF Aldergrove in Northern Ireland to RAF Finningley in Yorkshire encounter fog and icing conditions over England as they approach Finningley. One crew bails out when their Heyford becomes uncontrollable, two other Heyfords also crash, and three of the aircraft make forced landings; only one bomber reaches its destination. Three airmen die, one is seriously injured, and two are slightly injured in the disaster.
- December 15 – A Western Air Express Boeing 247 crashes just below Hardy Ridge on Lone Peak near Salt Lake City, Utah, with the major parts of the aircraft hurled over the ridge and falling over a thousand feet (300 meters) into a basin below. All seven people on board die.
- December 21 – Eddie August Schneider, Bert Acosta, and Frederic Ives Lord, as the Yankee Squadron, travel by ship to fight in the Spanish Civil War on the Republican side.
- December 27 – United Airlines Trip 34, a Boeing 247D, crashes at the head of Rice Canyon in Los Angeles County, California, killing all 12 people on board.
- December 28 – Deutsche Werke lays the keel of Germany's first aircraft carrier, designated Carrier A, at Kiel. Later renamed Graf Zeppelin, she will never be completed.
- December 29 – Compañía Aeronáutica Uruguaya S.A. (CAUSA) founded by the Uruguayan banker Luis J. Supervielle and Coronel Tydeo Larre Borges. Its initial fleet is two Junkers Ju 52 floatplanes, which begin service between Montevideo, Uruguay, and Buenos Aires, Argentina.
- December 31 – The Five-Power Treaty (often referred to as the Washington Naval Treaty) of 1922 expires, lifting all international restrictions on the make-up of the French, Italian, Japanese, British Royal, and United States navies, including the size of their aircraft carrier fleets and the characteristics of their individual aircraft carriers.

== First flights ==
- Aichi F1A
- Bellanca XSOE
- Focke-Wulf Fw 57
- Kawasaki Ki-28
- Nakajima Ki-12
- Piaggio P.23R
- Piaggio P.32
- Yokosuka H5Y (Allied reporting name "Cherry")
- Spring 1936 – Henschel Hs 124
- Late 1936 – Ilyushin I-21

=== January ===
- January 4 – Vought XSB2U-1, BuNo 9725, prototype of the SB2U Vindicator
- January 6 – Dewoitine D.513
- January 18 – Amiot 144

=== February ===
- February 14
  - Hawker Hector
  - Heinkel He 118

=== March ===
- March 4 – German airship LZ 129 Hindenburg
- March 5 – Supermarine Spitfire prototype K5054
- March 10 – Fairey Battle prototype K4303
- March 17 – Armstrong Whitworth Whitley prototype K4586
- March 27 – Fokker D.XXI prototype FD-322
- March 29 – Vought V-141
- March 31 – Ilyushin TsKB-30, prototype of the Ilyushin DB-3

=== April ===
- Beriev Be-2
- April 15 – Brewster XSBA-1, prototype of the Naval Aircraft Factory SBN
- April 25 – Potez 630

=== May ===
- Farman F.480 Alizé
- Mitsubishi Ki-15 (Allied reporting name "Babs")
- May 11 – Bristol Type 138
- May 12 – Messerschmitt Bf 110
- May 14 – Miles M.11 Whitney Straight G-AECT
- May 27 – Fairey Seafox

=== June ===
- Mitsubishi F1M (Allied reporting name "Pete")
- June 2 - LACAB GR.8
- June 15
  - Vickers Wellington prototype K4049
  - Westland Lysander prototype K6127
- June 21 - Handley Page Hampden prototype K4240
- June 25 - Bristol Blenheim prototype K7033
- June 26 - Focke-Wulf Fw 61 D-EBVU, first fully controllable helicopter

=== July ===
- Fairey Swordfish with 825 Naval Air Squadron, Royal Air Force
- July 3 – Short Empire prototype RMA Canopus
- July 14 – Kawanishi H6K (Allied reporting name "Mavis")
- July 25 – Lioré et Olivier LeO H-47

=== August ===
- Henschel Hs 126
- August 22 – Miles M.12 Mohawk G-AEKW

=== September ===
- September 12
  - Miles M.8 Peregrine
  - Nakajima Ki-34 (Allied reporting name "Thora")

=== October ===
- Blohm & Voss Ha 139
- October 10 – Handley Page H.P.54 Harrow
- October 15 – Nakajima Ki-27 (Allied reporting names "Nate" and "Abdul")
- October 18 - Hawks Miller HM-1 Time Flies
- October 28 - Dornier Do 19

=== December ===
- Mitsubishi Ki-21 (Allied reporting name "Sally")
- December 13 - PZL.37 Łoś
- December 21 - Junkers Ju 88 V1 prototype D-AQEN
- December 22 - North American XB-21 s/n 38-485
- December 27 - Petlyakov TB-7, redesignated the Petlyakov Pe-8 in 1942

== Entered service ==
- Grigorovich IP-1 with the Soviet Air Forces
- Hall PH-2 with the United States Coast Guard
- Henschel Hs 122 with the German Luftwaffe
- Ilyushin DB-3 with the Soviet Air Forces
- Potez 452 with French Naval Aviation
- Late summer 1936 – Arado Ar 68 with I Gruppe Jadggeschwader 134 "Horst Wessel" in German Luftwaffe
- Autumn 1936 – Henschel Hs 123 with Sturzkampfgeschwader 162 in the German Luftwaffe.

=== January ===
- Hawker Hind with the Royal Air Force
- Grumman F2F with the United States Navy
- January 29 – Grumman F3F, last biplane fighter to enter service with the United States Navy

=== February ===
- Northrop A-17 with the United States Army Air Corps

=== March ===
- Saro London with the Royal Air Force
- March 6 – Avro Anson with No. 48 Squadron, Royal Air Force

=== June ===
- Farman F.221 with the French Air Force

=== July ===
- Fairey Swordfish with No. 825 Squadron FAA
- July 13 – Dewoitine D.338 with Air France

=== August ===
- Aichi E10A with the Imperial Japanese Navy

=== October ===
- October 30 – Short S.23 Empire with Imperial Airways (first revenue flight)

=== November ===
- Fairey Hendon with No. 38 Squadron RAF

== Retirements ==
=== December ===
- Armstrong Whitworth Argosy by British Airways Ltd.
