= Bø Church (Hyllestad) =

Church in Vestland, Norway

- Bø kyrkje
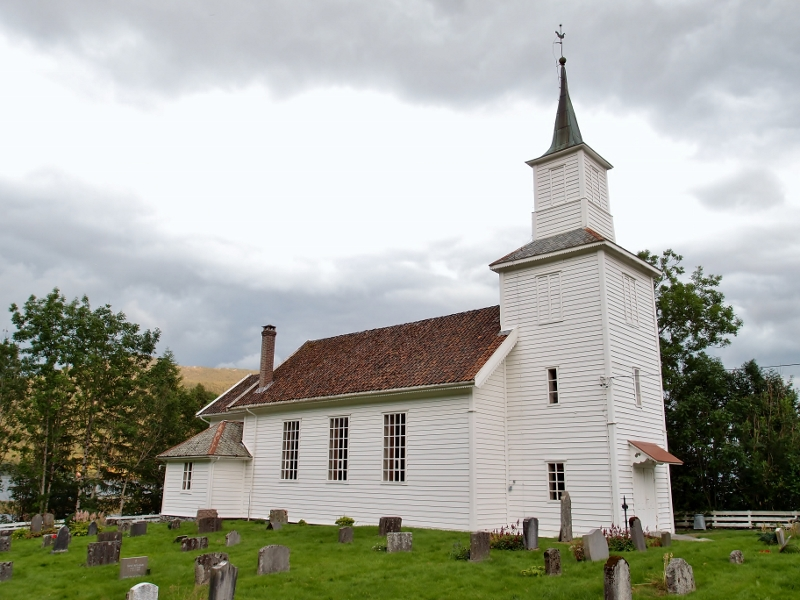
- View of the church
- Bø Church
- 61.1305°N 5.3289°E
- Location: Hyllestad Municipality, Vestland
- Country: Norway
- Denomination: Church of Norway
- Churchmanship: Evangelical Lutheran

History
- Status: Parish church
- Founded: 13th century
- Consecrated: 29 November 1868

Architecture
- Functional status: Active
- Architect: Jacob Wilhelm Nordan
- Architectural type: Long church
- Completed: 1868 (158 years ago)

Specifications
- Capacity: 200
- Materials: Wood

Administration
- Diocese: Bjørgvin bispedømme
- Deanery: Sunnfjord prosti
- Parish: Hyllestad
- Norwegian Cultural Heritage Site
- Type: Church
- Status: Listed
- ID: 83993

Bø Church (Norwegian: Bø kyrkje) is a parish church of the Church of Norway in Hyllestad Municipality in Vestland county, Norway. It is located in the village of Leirvik. It is one of the three churches for the Hyllestad parish which is part of the Sunnfjord prosti (deanery) in the Diocese of Bjørgvin. The white, wooden church was built in a long church design in 1868 using plans drawn up by the architect Jacob Wilhelm Nordan. The church seats about 200 people.

== History ==
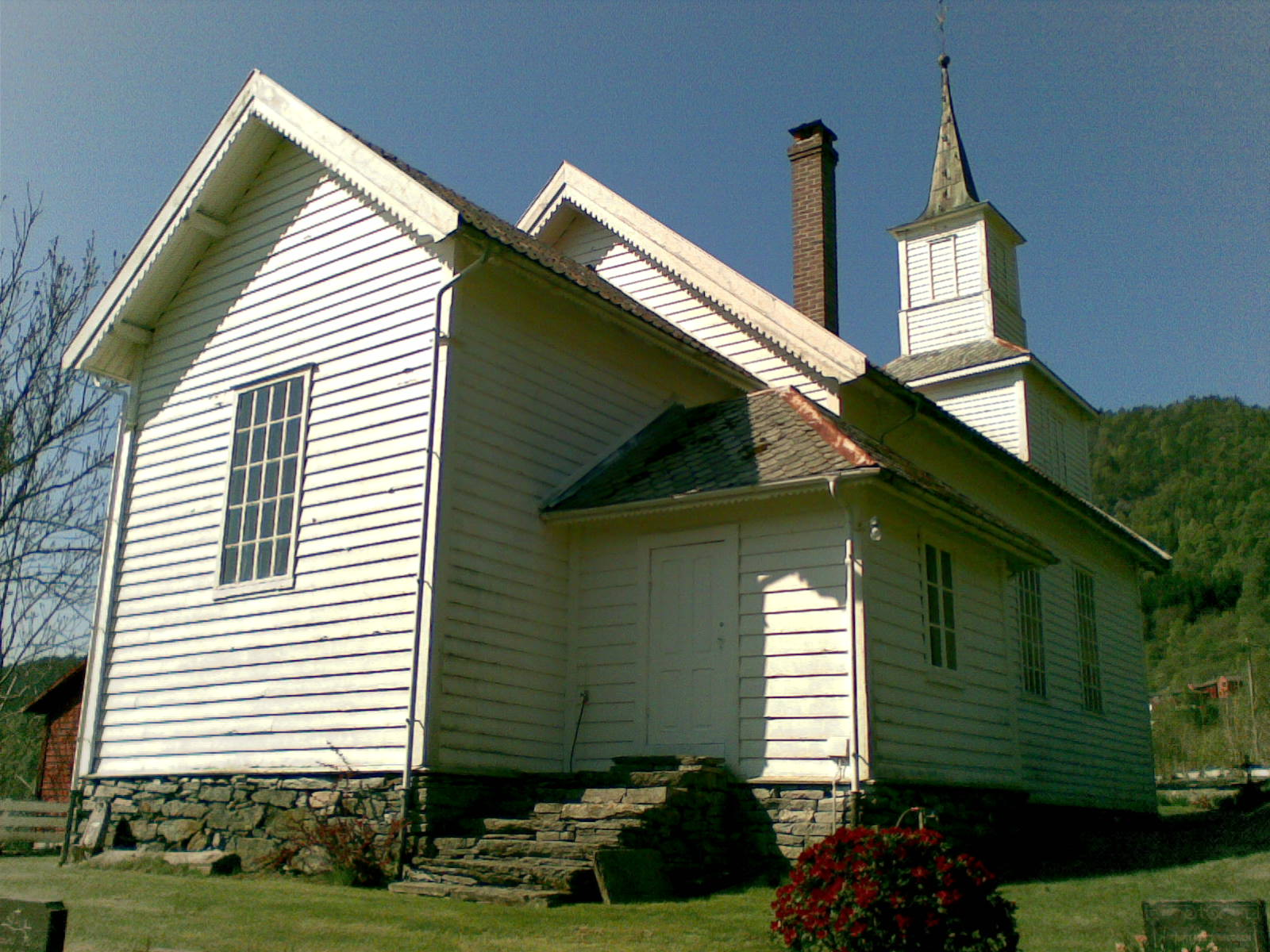
View of the rear of the building

The earliest existing historical records of the church date back to the year 1340, but the church was not new that year. The first church was a wooden stave church that was likely built during the 13th century. It was torn down at the end of the 16th century and a new church was built on the same site (probably) during the 1590s. In 1686, the church was described as a beautiful little timber-framed long church with a 7.5-by-7.5-metre (25 ft × 25 ft) nave, a 3.7-by-5-metre (12 ft × 16 ft) choir, and tower with a tarred exterior. In 1868, the church was torn down and a new church was built on the same site. This new building was designed by Jacob Wilhelm Nordan and built by the lead builder John Alver. The new church was consecrated on 29 November 1868. In 2013, the parish decided to make Hyllestad Church the main church for the parish and that Bø Church would be used less often, mostly for special events and periodically for worship services.

== See also ==
- List of churches in Bjørgvin
