= Øn Church =

Church in Vestland, Norway

- Øn kyrkje
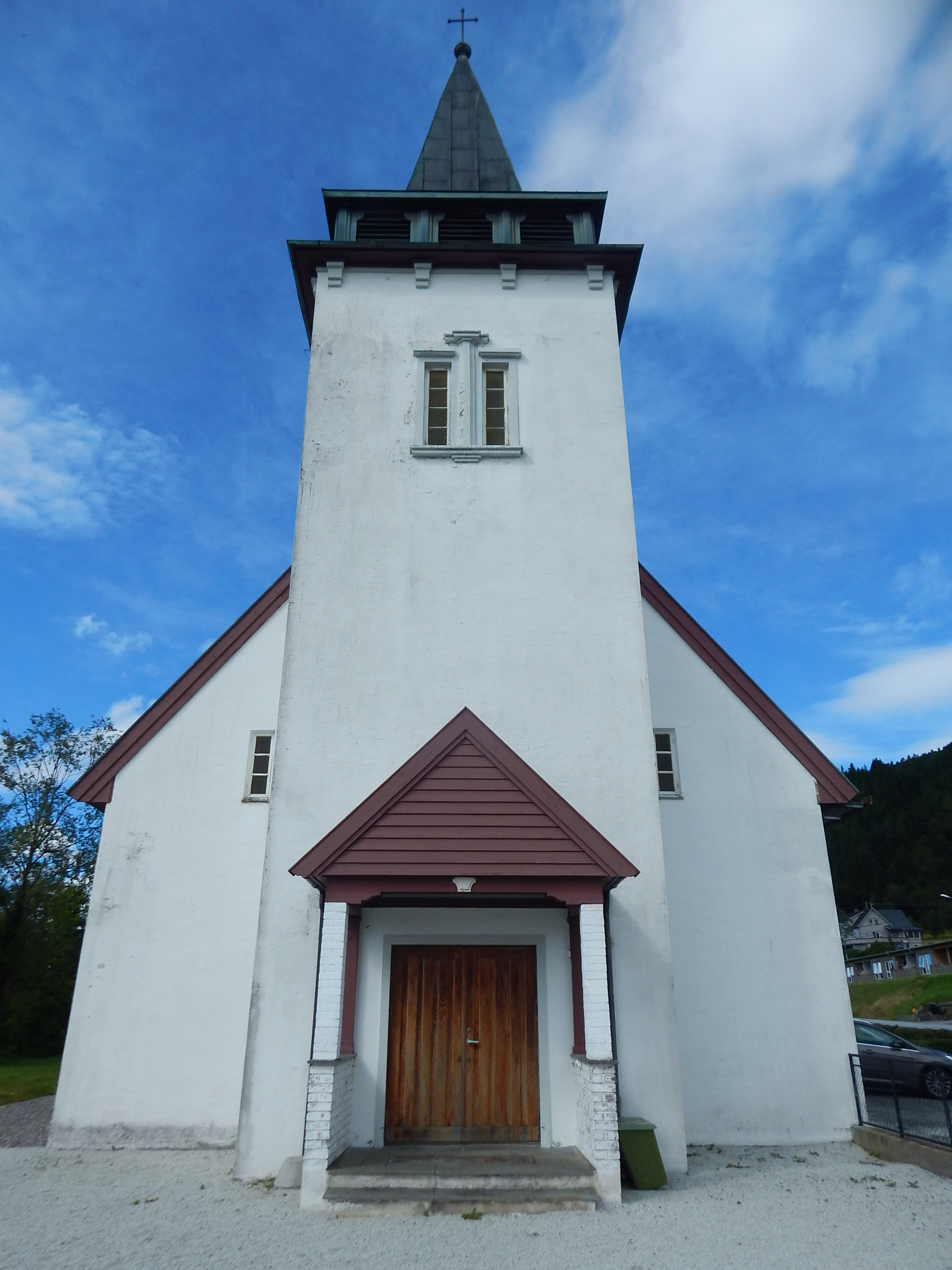
- View of the church
- Øn Church
- 61.2257°N 5.1712°E
- Location: Hyllestad Municipality, Vestland
- Country: Norway
- Denomination: Church of Norway
- Churchmanship: Evangelical Lutheran

History
- Status: Parish church
- Founded: 13th century
- Consecrated: 15 June 1958

Architecture
- Functional status: Active
- Architect: Ole Halvorsen
- Architectural type: Long church
- Completed: 1958 (68 years ago)

Specifications
- Capacity: 370
- Materials: Brick

Administration
- Diocese: Bjørgvin bispedømme
- Deanery: Sunnfjord prosti
- Parish: Hyllestad
- Norwegian Cultural Heritage Site
- Type: Church
- Status: Not protected
- ID: 85904

Øn Church (Norwegian: Øn kyrkje) is a parish church of the Church of Norway in Hyllestad Municipality in Vestland county, Norway. It is located in the village of Sørbøvågen. It is one of the three churches for the Hyllestad parish which is part of the Sunnfjord prosti (deanery) in the Diocese of Bjørgvin. The brick church was built in a long church design in 1958 using plans drawn up by the architect Ole Halvorsen. The church seats about 370 people.

== History ==
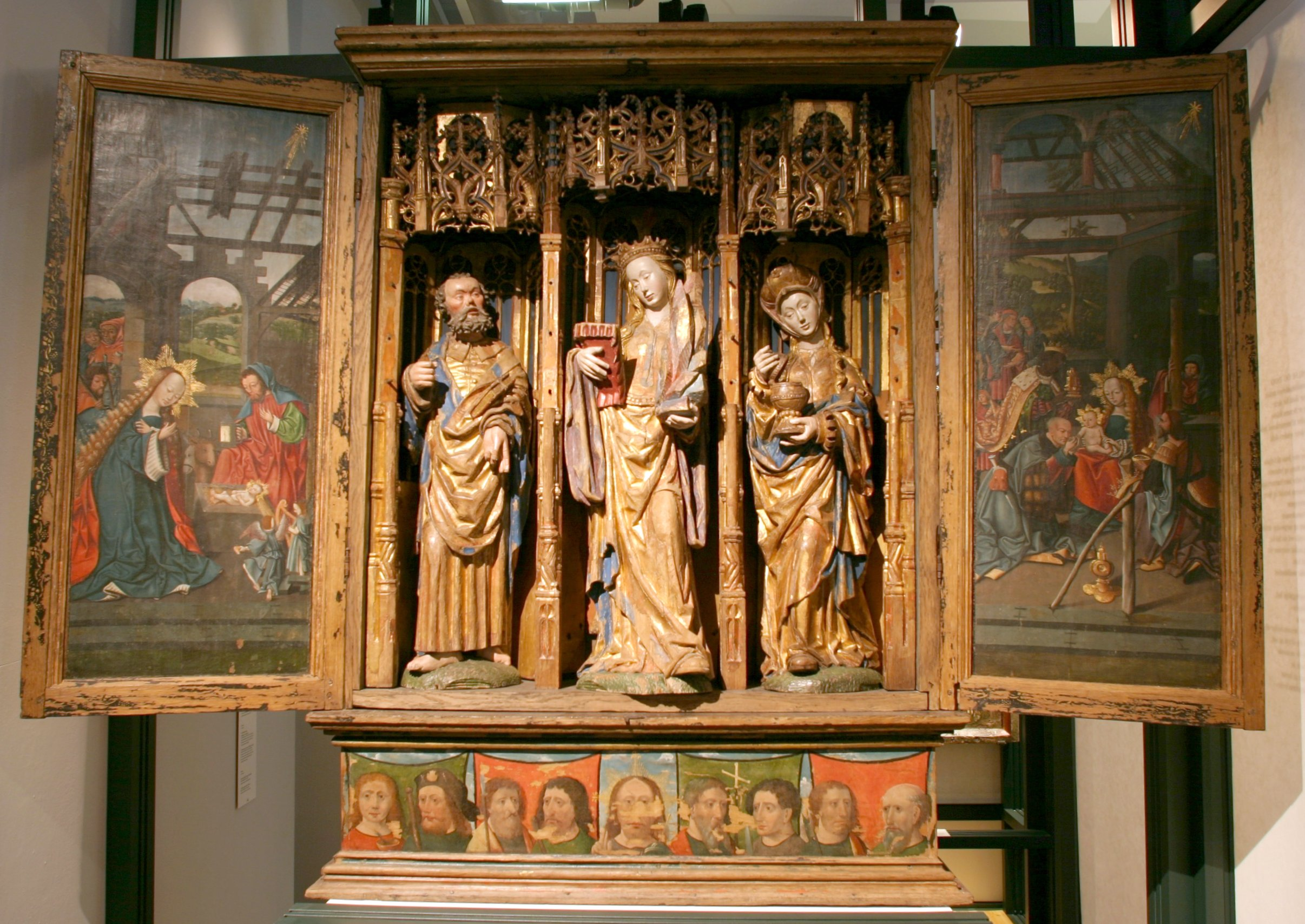
View of the altarpiece at Øn Church

The earliest existing historical records of the church date back to the year 1327, but the church was not new that year. The first church was likely a wooden stave church that was likely built during the 13th century. This first church was located on the shores of the Hyllestadfjorden, about 3 kilometres (1.9 mi) east of the present-day village of Sørbøvågen where the present church is located. A stone entrance gate to the churchyard has the date 1228 inscribed on it, which possibly means that is when the first church was built on the site. The old church existed there until around the year 1600 when it was torn down and replaced on the same site by a timber-framed long church. In 1870, the church was torn down and replaced on the same site with a new church (the third church to be built on the site). This building was struck by lightning on 4 November 1940 and it burned to the ground.

Due to the occupation of Norway by the Germans during World War II, the church was not rebuilt for quite a while. There was some controversy over where to build the replacement church: on the original location at Øn or in the village of Sørbøvågen. After some debate, there was a vote held on 15 May 1947 and 157 people voted to rebuild on the old site and 272 people voted to build it in Sørbøvågen. The new church was built out of brick and concrete. It was designed by Ole Halvorsen and the lead builder was Ivar Fleten. The new building was consecrated on 15 June 1958 by the Bishop Ragnvald Indrebø. In 2001, the parish of Øn was closed down and merged with the Hyllestad Church parish, so all three churches in the municipality were part of the same parish for the whole municipality. In 2011, the parish council debated closing the church and tearing it down because it was in poor condition, but in the end, the community raised money and fixed up the church. In 2013, the parish decided to make Hyllestad Church the main church for the parish and that Øn Church would be used less often, mostly for special events and periodically for worship services.

== See also ==
- List of churches in Bjørgvin
