= Ragnar Fjørtoft =

Norwegian meteorologist

- Born: August 1, 1913; Kristiania, Norway
- Died: May 28, 1998 (aged 84); Oslo, Norway
- Spouse: Ragnhild Nordskog
- Awards: Order of St. Olav, International Meteorological Organization Prize
- Scientific career
- Workplaces: University of Oslo, University of Copenhagen, Institute for Advanced Study

Ragnar Fjørtoft (1 August 1913 – 28 May 1998) was an internationally recognized Norwegian meteorologist. He was part of a Princeton, New Jersey team that in 1950 performed the first successful numerical weather prediction using the ENIAC electronic computer. He was also a professor of meteorology at the University of Copenhagen and director of the Norwegian Meteorological Institute.

== Biography ==
Ragnar Fjørtoft was born in Kristiania to the deaf teacher Lauritz Hansen Fjørtoft (1877–1941) and his wife Anne Birgitte Marie Schultze (1881–??). The family eventually moved to Trondheim, where Fjørtoft took his examen artium in 1933. He thereupon moved to Oslo to study natural science, with meteorology as specialization. His teacher was Halvor Solberg, who earlier had been a student of Vilhelm Bjerknes.

On 29 March 1939, Fjørtoft married Ragnhild Nordskog (1918–2019). In the same year, he moved to Bergen, where he became a meteorologist at the Forecasting Division of Western Norway. Both in Oslo and Bergen, Fjørtoft was engaged in political left-wing activism in Mot Dag, and was a member of the socialist students' league Sosialistisk studenterlag in Bergen.

In 1946, Fjørtoft published a treatise on the stability of circular vortices, which gained international recognition. In the same year, he was appointed meteorologist at the Norwegian Meteorological Institute, where he came in contact with Arnt Eliassen. In 1949, Fjørtoft was invited to the Institute for Advanced Study in Princeton, United States. Here, he joined a team composed of the American meteorologists Jule Charney, Philip Thomson, Larry Gates, and applied mathematician John von Neumann, who performed the first successful numerical prediction using the ENIAC electronic computer with the assistance of ENIAC programmer Klara Dan von Neumann. They published their work on numerical weather prediction in the periodical Tellus in November 1950.

In 1951, Fjørtoft moved back to Norway, where he took a grand doctorate at the University of Oslo on the stability of atmospheric waves. In 1953, he moved back to Princeton, where he stayed for a year. Fjørtoft was also a professor in theoretical meteorology at the University of Copenhagen from 1950 to 1955. In 1956, he joined the Norwegian Academy of Science and Letters.

Upon leaving the University of Copenhagen in 1955, Fjørtoft was appointed director of the Norwegian Meteorological Institute, where he stayed until 1978. He was also Professor II at the University of Oslo from 1967 to 1983.

== Honors ==
Ragnar Fjørtoft received several decorations in his later life. In 1967, he was decorated as Knight, First Class of the Royal Norwegian Order of St. Olav. He was awarded the Fridtjof Nansen Prize for Excellent Research in 1977, and the International Meteorological Organization Prize in 1991. Fjørtoft died on 28 May 1998 in Oslo.

== See also ==
- History of numerical weather prediction
