= Henning Tønsberg =

Norwegian mountain climber, photographer, ski jumper, and pharmacist

Henning Heyerdahl Tønsberg jr. (1907–1987) was a Norwegian mountain climber, photographer, ski jumper and pharmacist.

As a ski jumper, he won the competition in Solbergbakken, Hannibalbakken and the Holmenkollen Ski Festival in 1927. He won Galdhøpiggrennet in 1934. In June 1936, he participated the expedition to recover three bodies from Lihesten after the Havørn Accident. On 22 August, Schlytter and three others in the expedition were awarded the Medal for Heroic Deeds. He was president of Norsk Tindeklub from 1948 to 1952. He became director of Løvens Kemiske Fabrikk from 1963.
