= Havørn Accident =

1936 plane crash in Hyllestad, Norway

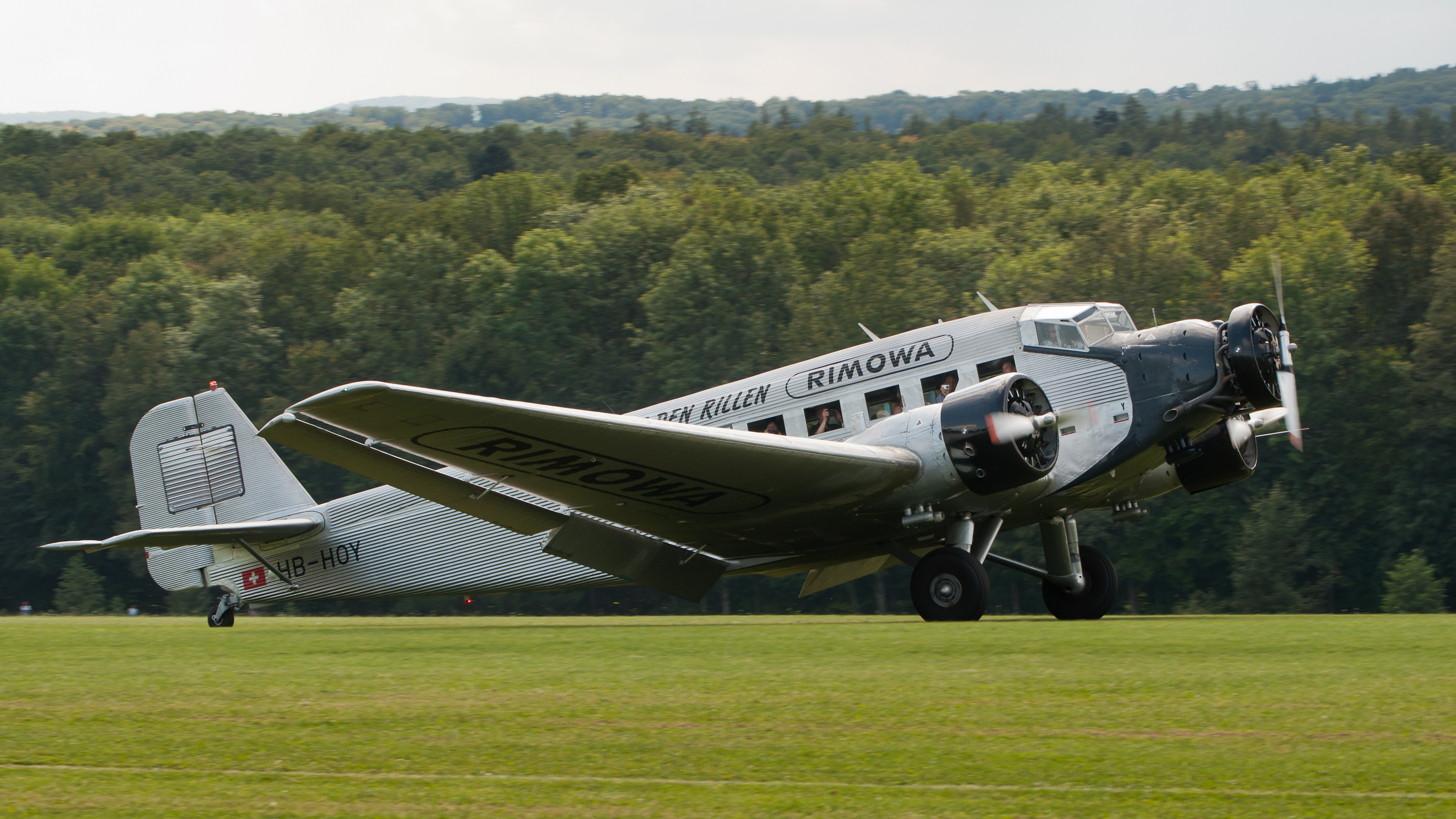
- A Junkers Ju 52, similar to the aircraft involved

Accident
- Date: 16 June 1936
- Summary: Controlled flight into terrain
- Site: Lihesten, Hyllestad Municipality, Norway; 61.1569°N 5.1639°E

Aircraft
- Aircraft type: Junkers Ju 52
- Operator: Norwegian Air Lines
- Registration: LN-DAE
- Flight origin: Bergen
- Destination: Tromsø
- Passengers: 3
- Crew: 4
- Fatalities: 7
- Survivors: 0

The Havørn Accident (Norwegian: Havørn-ulykken) was a German Junkers Ju 52 aircraft's controlled flight into terrain at the mountain Lihesten in Hyllestad Municipality, Norway on 16 June 1936 at 07:00. The aircraft, operated by Norwegian Air Lines, was en route from Bergen to Tromsø. The pilots were unaware that they were flying a course parallel to the one planned 15 to 20 kilometers (9.3 to 12.4 mi) farther east. The crew of four and three passengers were all killed in what was the first fatal aviation accident in Norway. The aircraft landed on a shelf on the mountain face. A first expedition found four bodies, but attempts to reach the shelf with the main part of the aircraft and three more bodies failed. A second party sent two days later, coordinated by Bernt Balchen and led by Boye Schlytter and Henning Tønsberg, succeeded in recovering the remaining bodies.

== Accident ==
The air service between Bergen and Tromsø was started by Norwegian Air Lines on 7 June 1936. It was operated with Havørn, a Junkers Ju 52, registration LN-DAE, which had been bought from Deutsche Lufthansa. On 16 June 1936 at 06:30 Central European Time, the flight departed from the water aerodrome in Sandviken, Bergen. On board was a crew of four and three passengers, and a load of 13 bags of 50 kilograms (110 lb) of post.

The aircraft's captain was Ditlev Pentz Smith, age 27. He had started flying for the Norwegian Army Air Service in 1930, and later become a civilian pilot for Widerøe. He was considered one of the country's most renowned pilots and was active with competition flights. He was assisted by first officer Erik Storm, age 32, who had a background from the Royal Norwegian Navy Air Service. The reserve pilot was Peter Ruth Paasche, age 21, and the radio operator was Per Erling Hegle, aged 28 and a trained mechanic. All four had been chosen to regularly fly the Bergen–Tromsø route. The three passengers were Inspector Sven Svensen Løgit, Consul Wilhelm Andreas Mejdell Dall and journalist Harald Wigum of Bergens Tidende.

The weather report, which had been delivered orally by meteorologist-on-duty of the Forecasting Division of Western Norway at the airport, stated wind from southeast at 5 to 15 kilometers per hour (3 to 9 mph), overcast, and clouds down to 200 meters (700 ft), and possibly lower in some places. The visibility was 4 kilometers (2.5 mi). The last radio contact between the aircraft and the airport in Bergen was at 06:54, when Hegle reported clouds at 1,000 to 1,500 meters (3,000 to 5,000 ft) elevation and between 4 and 10 kilometers (2 and 6 mi) visibility. He reported that the aircraft held a course towards Krakhellesundet, which was the prescribed procedure during such horrible weather conditions, and that the aircraft was south of Sognesjøen.

However, the aircraft was not where the pilots thought it was—instead it was 15 to 20 kilometers (9.3 to 12.4 mi) farther east. Eyewitnesses reported that after it had crossed Sognefjorden, it had changed course westward and started to ascend. At 07:00, a loud crash was heard, although there were no eyewitnesses to the crash itself. The aircraft had followed a parallel, but more eastern, course and had hit Lihesten, a mountain rising up from Lifjorden, at 600 meters (2,000 ft) above mean sea level. The aircraft caught fire and was highly visible from the surrounding area. Parts of the aircraft fell to the foot of the mountain, and the wreckage was scattered across the base of the mountain. The controlled flight into terrain was the first fatal aviation accident in Norway.

== Salvage and investigation ==
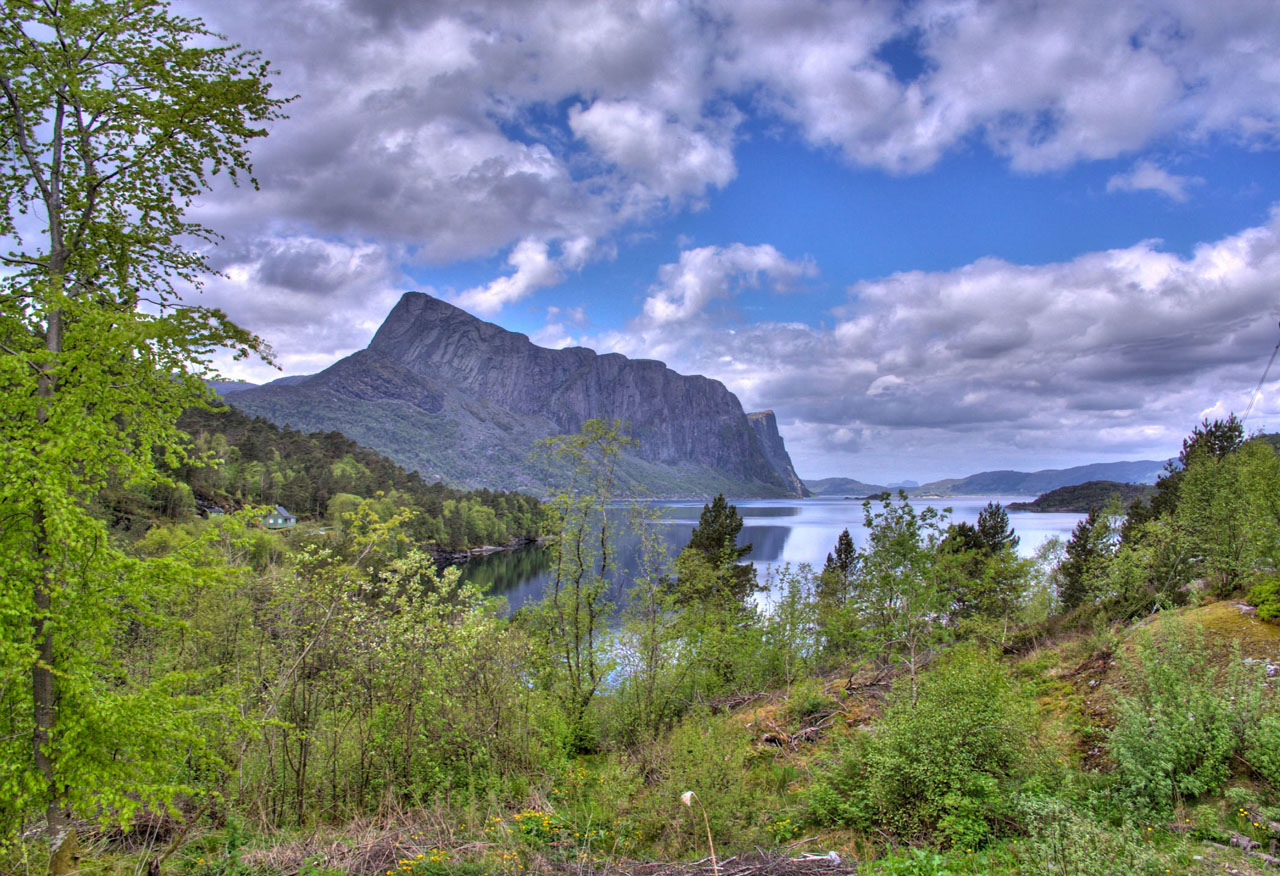
Lihesten, the location of the accident

Several locals rushed to the foot of the mountain, and at 08:30, Sheriff Kaare Bredvik arrived at the scene. Two corpses were found immediately, but were so scorched that they could not be identified until at hospital. There were rumors of survivors as movement had been spotted on the mountain side. Bredvik had difficulty communicating with his superiors in Sogn Police District, and had to contact them via Bergen. From there, the press was also alerted, and several locals became ad hoc correspondents. The home of Deputy Mayor Hans A. Risnes was used as a base of operations. However, searching was made difficult by the lack of any radio connection at the foot of the hill. Eventually a "shouting relay" was created, allowing messages to be sent effectively. A party of experienced mountaineers, who had many times succeeded at getting sheep down from rock shelves, attempted to reach the wreck, which was located on a shelf 100 meters (300 ft) above the foot. Despite three attempts the first day, they did not succeed at reaching the aircraft.

Chief of Police Alf Reksten arrived in the afternoon and took over responsibility. Later, the ship Mira, belonging to Bergen Steamship Company (BSD), arrived with two doctors, two nurses, material from the Red Cross, specialist police officers, fire fighters, representatives from the airline and Norway Post, and journalists. The sister aircraft Najaden arrived later in the afternoon with relatives of the dead and journalists; its main objective was to search for survivors, but there was no possibility for it to land on the mountain and so could not help with the salvaging. Later a Widerøe aircraft arrived as well, which transported DNL's technical director Bernt Balchen, Captain Eckhoff, who worked for the aviation authorities, and Gjermundson from the insurance company. The three, along with Reksten and Bredvik, became the investigation commission.

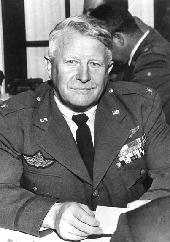
The salvage and investigation was led by Bernt Balchen.

After Balchen had investigated the accident site from the plane, a party of five climbers started at 18:00 to climb the mountain side. When they reached the shelf, they found two bodies, a large amount of post and parts from the plane, including a wing. The bodies were sent down the mountain side. They then attempted to climb further up to the main wreck where the last three bodies were presumed to be, but this was deemed too dangerous by Balchen, and the operation terminated. Mira returned to Bergen at 02:00. The following day, four people attempted to climb down the mountain face to reach the wreck. Magnus Nipen was lowered 50 meters (160 ft), but it was impossible to descend the remaining 70 to 80 meters (230 to 260 ft). Balchen concluded that it was impossible to reach the aircraft, and returned to Oslo the same afternoon.

The locals were determined to reach the aircraft: Magnus Kolgrov, along with Robert and Bernt Porten, who along with two others descended a further 30 meters (100 ft). Although they were able to salvage two post bags, they were not able to reach the wreck. The operation took ten hours. From then, the police stationed an officer at the top of the mountain, both to hinder theft and to enforce a climbing ban.

In a letter to the editor in Aftenposten on 17 June, submitted by Robert M. Steen, it was suggested that reaching the ledge would be a suitable challenge for the mountaineering association Norsk Tindeklub. The newspaper contacted the club, and offered to cover all expenses. The club sent Boye Schlytter and Henning Tønsberg to Bergen, where they joined forces with police officer Hermann Heggenes and photographer and firefighter Alf Adriansen. The expedition was led by Balchen, arriving with the BSD vessel Vulcanus. Arne Næss, Jr. had just used bolts to climb the Dolomites, and these had been lent to Tønsberg. As such, it was the first time bolts were used for climbing in Norway.

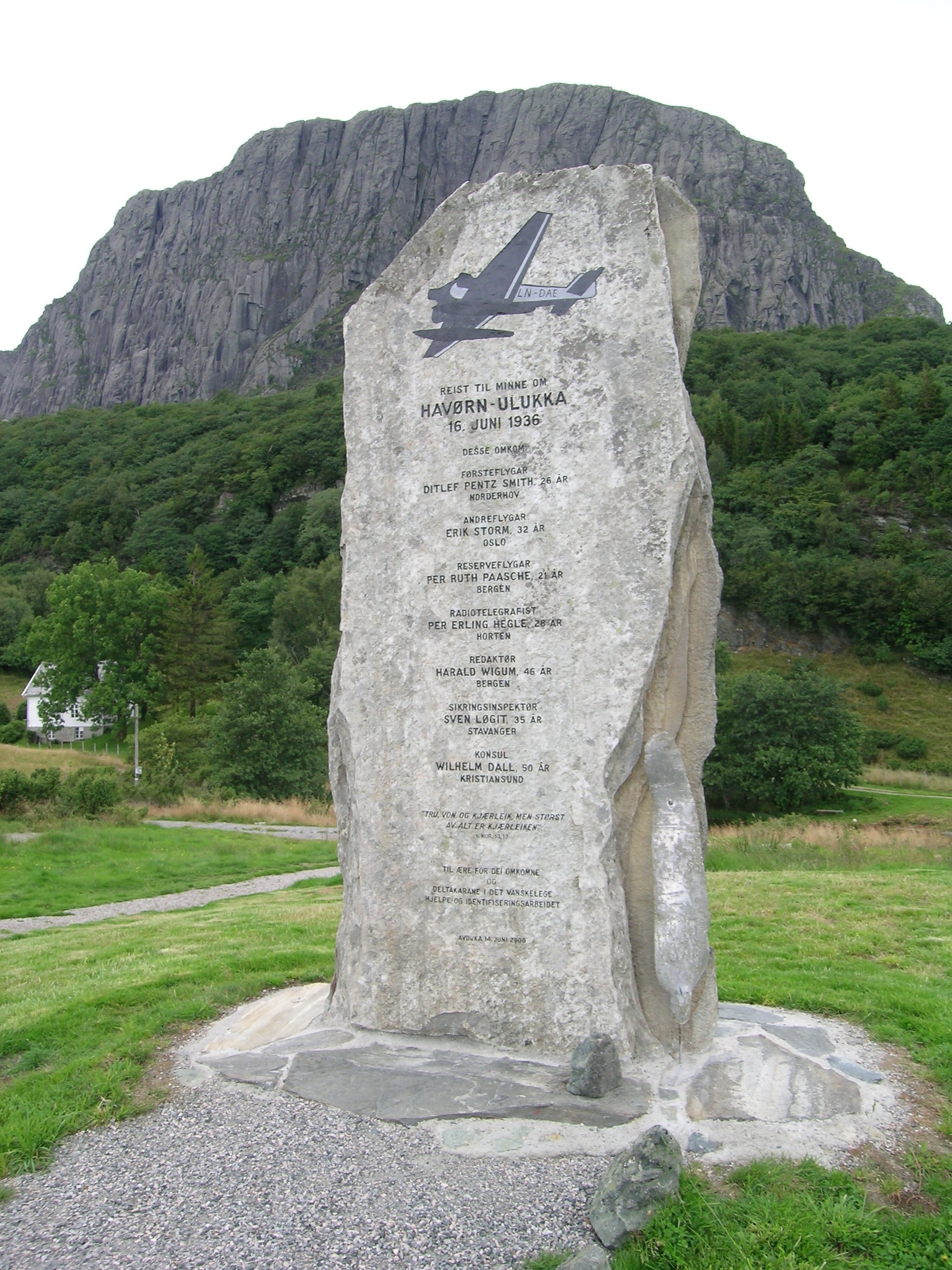
Memorial to those who died in the Havørn accident, 16 June 1936. The mountain peak in the background of this photo shows the crash site.

They started the ascent at 19:00 and reached the first shelf about two hours later. Here, a field radio was stationed. Later the same evening, they reached the main shelf where the aircraft body lay. Although finding the remaining bodies, the team only salvaged some post, concluding that it would be too difficult for them to take down the bodies. They were down again at 01:30. At 10:00 on 20 June, the team again ascended the mountain. Bernt Porten climbed halfway up at least a dozen times, taking water up and bringing down bodies wrapped in tarpaulin. All three bodies and the climbers were down again at 21:00.

== Aftermath ==
The airline offered compensation to the locals, but this was rejected in a letter date 27 June, in which the locals collectively stated that they were just happy to help. In a Council of State on 21 August, Schlytter, Tønsberg, Robert Porten and Heggenes were awarded the Medal for Heroic Deeds. The medals were presented in a ceremony at Hotel Continental, Oslo some days later.

In early 1937, news surfaced that the widow and father of Erik Storm filed a lawsuit against the Norwegian Air Lines. The father, Major B. Storm, stated that his goal was "rehabilitation of my son as well as compensation". The family had received 45,000 kr of insurance money, but reportedly wanted more, and also desired to have the airline take the responsibility for the accident. The family sent a formal petition to the Parliament of Norway asking for further accident investigation, but after acquiring statements from the Chief of Police of Sogn and the Riksadvokaten and cycling the case through Ministry of Defence, the Parliament declared that no action should be taken. In addition, the lawsuit was dropped, after the airline reached an "agreement" with Storm's family, and had a letter publicly printed in which Storm was cleared of all responsibility for the accident.

On 23 May 1937, a group of four climbers descended the face on a different route and were able to find a golden ring and a golden watch, which they sent to the airline. They found some body parts which they offered to recover for 500 Norwegian krone, but this was rejected. Heggenes stated that these were parts which had been buried by the previous expedition.

To replace the aircraft, DNL bought another Ju 52, named Falken, used from Lufthansa. Parts from the wreck are on display at Flyhistorisk Museum, Sola. On 14 June 2008, a memorial was erected halfway up the mountain, with 200 people attending the ceremony.
