= Boye Schlytter =

Norwegian businessman and mountaineer

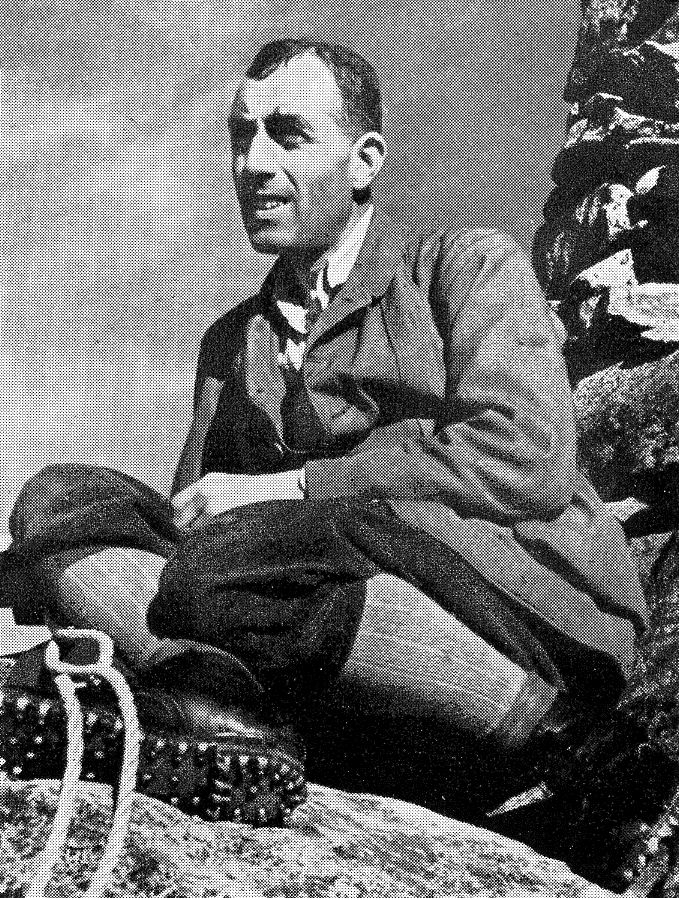
Boye Schlytter

Boye Hamilton Schlytter (22 October 1891 – 9 December 1977) was a Norwegian businessperson and mountain climber. He was president of Norsk Tindeklub from 1928 to 1948. In June 1936, he led the expedition to recover three bodies from Lihesten after the Havørn Accident. On 22 August, Schlytter and three others in the expedition were awarded the Medal for Heroic Deeds.
