= Sørbøvågen =

Village in Hyllestad Municipality, Norway

- Village
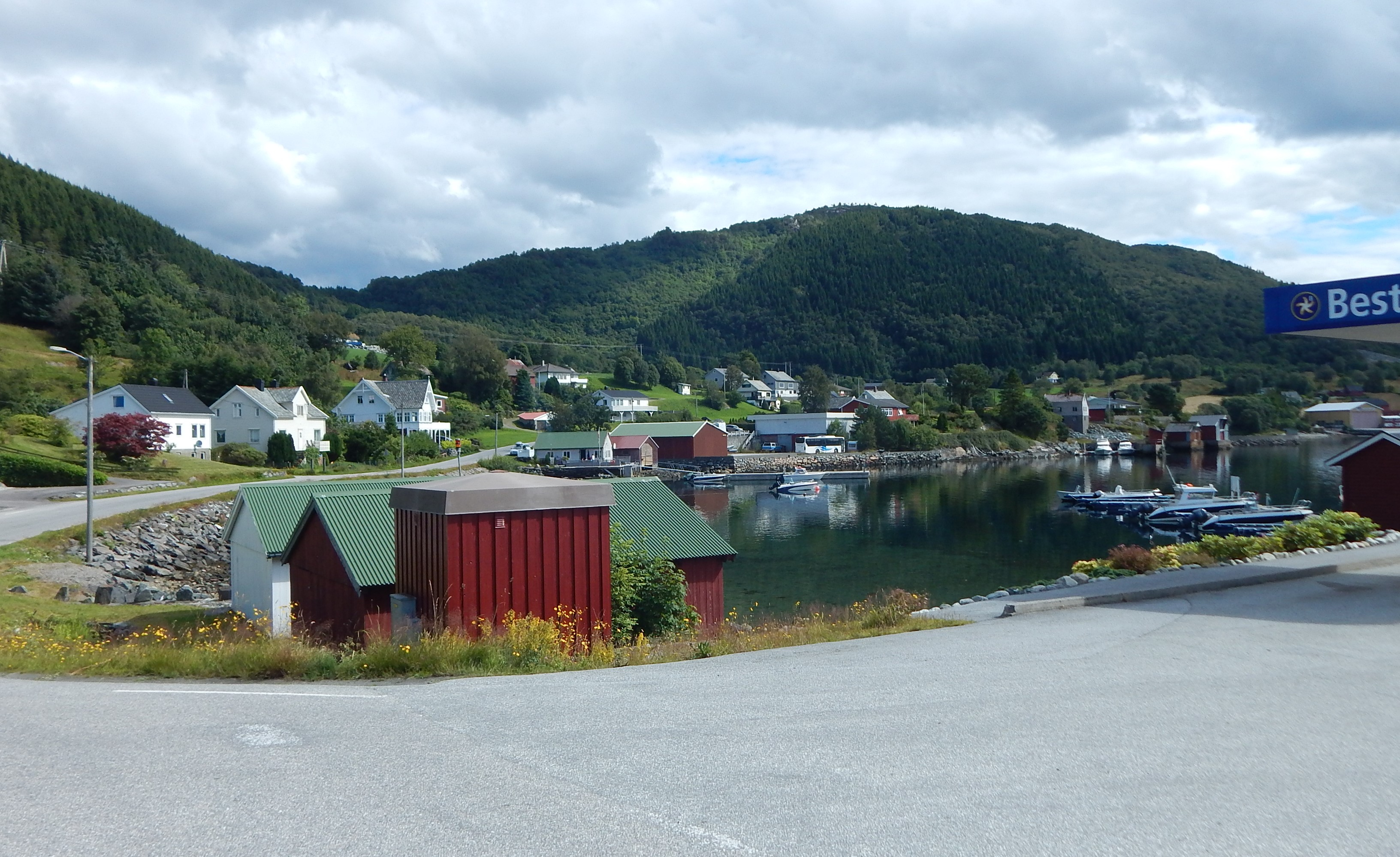
- View of the village
- Interactive map of Sørbøvågen
- Location within Vestland Location within Norway
- Coordinates: 61.22639°N 5.17376°E
- Country: Norway
- Region: Western Norway
- County: Vestland
- District: Sogn
- Municipality: Hyllestad Municipality
- Elevation: 4 m (13 ft)
- Time zone: UTC+01:00 (CET)
  - Summer (DST): UTC+02:00 (CEST)
- Post Code: 6958 Sørbøvåg

Sørbøvågen is a village in Hyllestad Municipality in Vestland county, Norway. The village is located along the northern shore of Åfjorden. It is located about 10 kilometres (6.2 mi) northwest of the village of Hyllestad, the administrative centre of the municipality. The village of Hellevika (in the Fjaler Municipality) lies about 10 kilometres (6.2 mi) to the north. Sørbøvågen is a small village, but it has a retirement/nursing home, a community hall, a billiards club, and it is the site of Øn Church which serves the northwestern part of the municipality.
