= Leirvik, Hyllestad =

Village in Hyllestad Municipality, Norway

Leirvik Bø
- Village
- Interactive map of Leirvik
- Location within Vestland Location within Norway
- Coordinates: 61.13685°N 5.3475°E
- Country: Norway
- Region: Western Norway
- County: Vestland
- District: Sogn
- Municipality: Hyllestad Municipality
- Elevation: 3 m (9.8 ft)
- Time zone: UTC+01:00 (CET)
  - Summer (DST): UTC+02:00 (CEST)
- Post Code: 6953 Leirvik i Sogn

Leirvik is a village in Hyllestad Municipality in Vestland county, Norway. The village is located along the inner part of the Bøfjorden, a small fjord off the main Sognefjorden. The village lies about 7 kilometres (4.3 mi) southeast of the village of Hyllestad.

Havyard Leirvik, the largest municipal business, is a shipyard on the southwest side of Leirvik. Bø Church is located on the western side of the fjord, not far from the village centre.
