= Håkon Steinar Giil =

Norwegian politician

Håkon Steinar Giil (born 28 January 1943 in Hyllestad Municipality) is a Norwegian politician for the Centre Party.

He was elected to the Norwegian Parliament from Sogn og Fjordane in 1993, but was not re-elected in 1997. Instead he served in the position of deputy representative during the term 1997–2001.

Giil served as mayor of Hyllestad Municipality from 1987 to 1993. He was originally a member of the executive committee of the municipality council, in 1983–1987, and returned to this position from 1999 to 2015.
