= 1936 Jersey Air Disaster =

Aviation incident in the Channel Islands

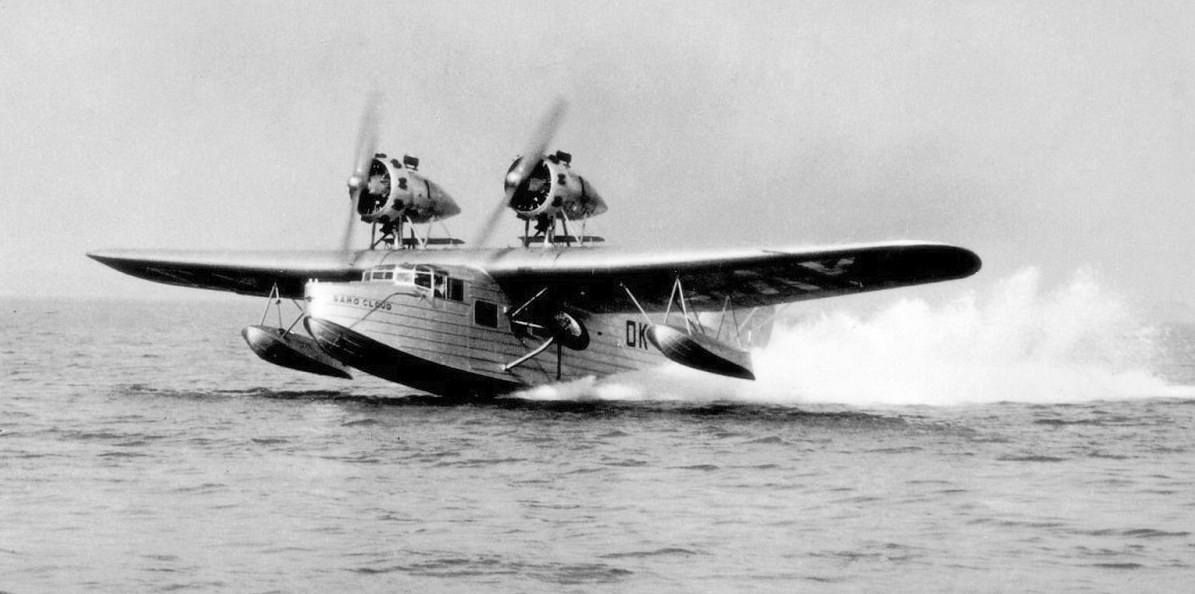
- A Saro Cloud, similar to the accident aircraft.

Accident
- Date: 31 July 1936
- Summary: Ditching due to engine failure
- Site: Off Jersey, Channel Islands

Aircraft
- Aircraft type: Saro Cloud
- Aircraft name: Cloud of Iona
- Operator: Guernsey Airways
- Registration: G-ABXW
- Flight origin: Guernsey, Channel Islands
- Destination: Jersey, Channel Islands
- Occupants: 10
- Passengers: 8
- Crew: 2
- Fatalities: 10
- Survivors: 0

The 1936 Jersey Air Disaster occurred on 31 July 1936 when the Cloud of Iona, a Saro Cloud flying boat operated by Guernsey Airways, ditched into the sea off Jersey, Channel Islands, during a flight between Guernsey and Jersey. Investigators believed that the flying boat failed to reach its destination due to engine failure. All ten on board were assumed to have died.

== Accident ==
Guernsey Airways was formed in 1934 as a subsidiary of Jersey Airways to operate services between St Peter Port, Guernsey and St Brelade's Bay in Jersey. On 31 July 1936 the Cloud of Iona failed to arrive in Jersey. It had departed around 19:00 and the journey should have taken 20 minutes. The weather was poor and visibility was reduced by drizzle. At 22:00 the St Helier lifeboat was launched to search for the flying boat; it searched all night without finding anything. In the morning a number of French military aircraft from Cherbourg and Royal Air Force aircraft joined the search: an RAF aircraft reported sighting fabric and plywood in the sea. On 2 August three motorboats from Jersey returned with wreckage including wood, cushions and fabric, which was identified as coming from the Cloud of Iona. An official from Channel Islands Airways, the parent company of both Jersey and Guernsey Airways, made a statement:

Prolonged search by every means at the disposal of the company has failed to locate the actual place at which the missing air liner disappeared. Wreckage verified as part of the flying-boat has been found near the Minquiers Rocks, which indicates that the disaster took place between that position and Jersey. The search continues. The company expresses its deep regret to the relatives of those who must now be presumed to have lost their lives.

== Investigation ==
It was concluded that, following total engine failure, the pilot was able to land safely on the sea and, although everyone onboard had time to put on their lifejacket, the aircraft was overturned and broken up by the sea and everyone drowned.

== Aircraft ==
The aircraft involved was a twin-engined Saro Cloud flying boat built in 1932 and registered as G-ABXW. It was original operated by British Flying Boats Limited who named it the Cloud of Iona, before it was sold to Guernsey Airways in September 1934.

== Aftermath ==
The inter-island seaplane service was suspended and did not operate again after the accident. The Cloud of Iona was to have been fitted with wireless equipment the week after the accident. In January 1937 the airline was prosecuted, in that they permitted the machine to be used on July 29, 30 and 31 without an approved wireless installation. They were fined £300.
