= Hyllestad (village) =

Village in Hyllestad Municipality, Norway

- Village
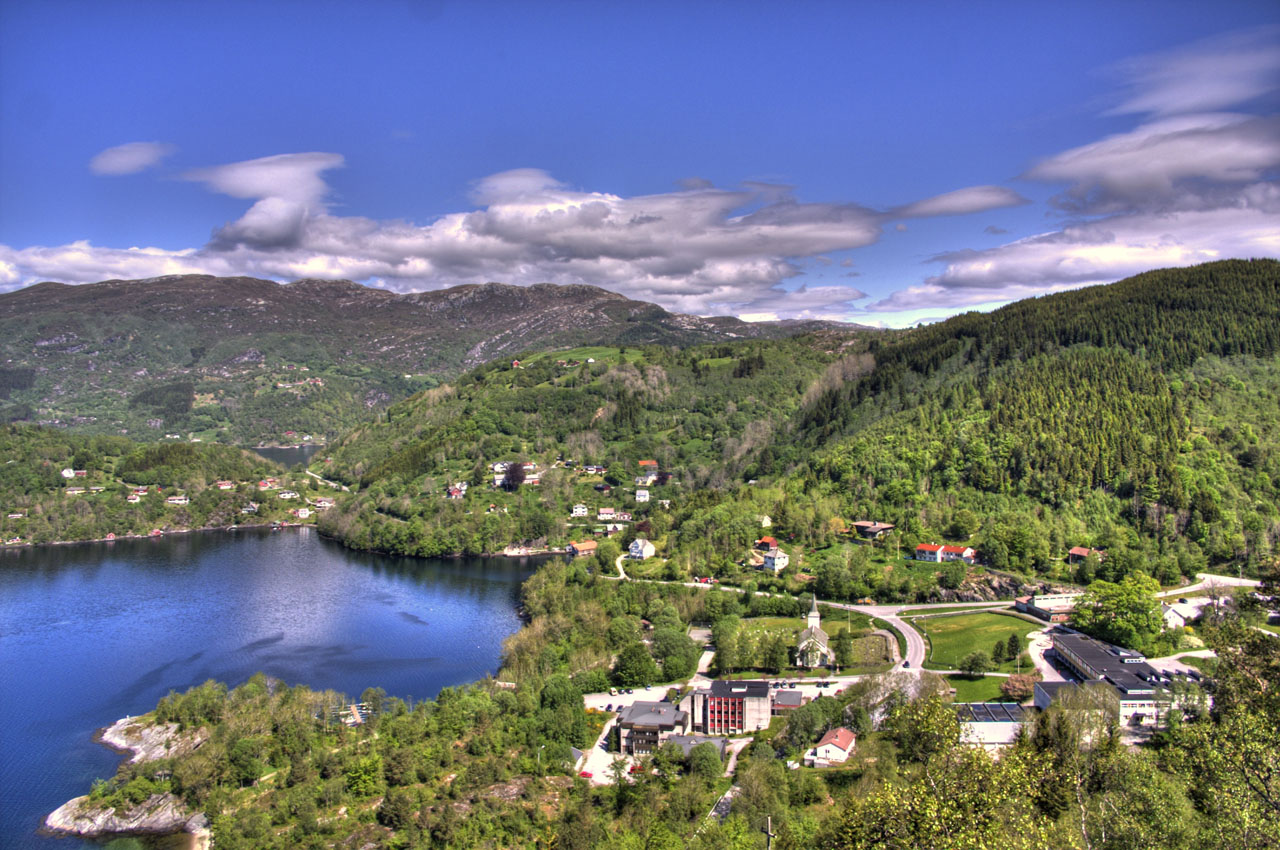
- View of the village
- Interactive map of Hyllestad
- Location within Vestland Location within Norway
- Coordinates: 61.17112°N 5.29606°E
- Country: Norway
- Region: Western Norway
- County: Vestland
- District: Sogn
- Municipality: Hyllestad Municipality
- Elevation: 32 m (105 ft)
- Time zone: UTC+01:00 (CET)
  - Summer (DST): UTC+02:00 (CEST)
- Post Code: 6957 Hyllestad

Hyllestad is the administrative centre of Hyllestad Municipality in Vestland county, Norway. The village is located at the end of the Hyllestadfjorden, about 7 kilometres (4.3 mi) northwest of the village of Leirvik and about 10 kilometres (6.2 mi) southeast of the village of Sørbøvågen.

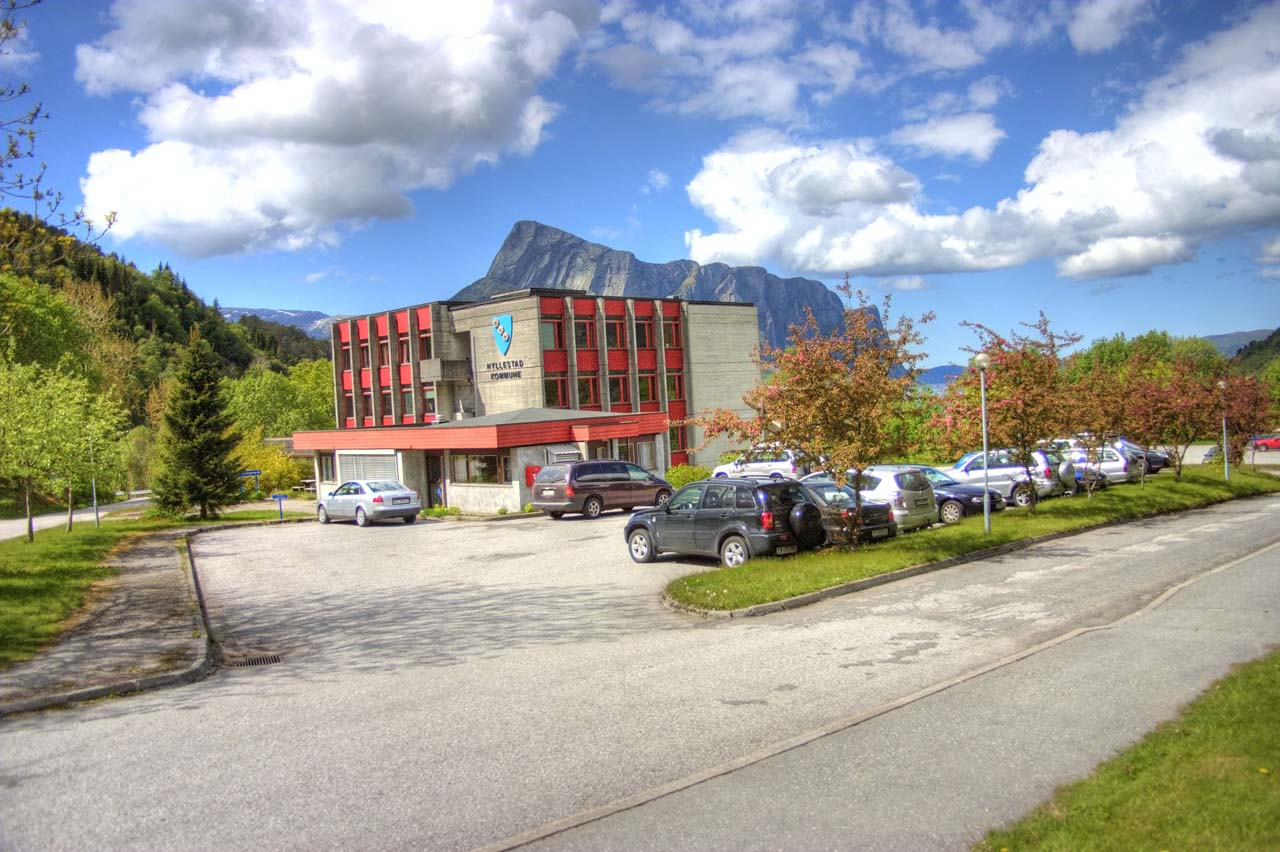
View of the municipal government building in Hyllestad

The village of Hyllestad is the municipal centre and it is the site of the municipal government, local secondary school, bank, post office, and stores. Hyllestad Church is also located in this village, although it was historically located about 0.5 kilometres (0.31 mi) to the northeast on the Hyllestad farm.
