= Congressional Airport =

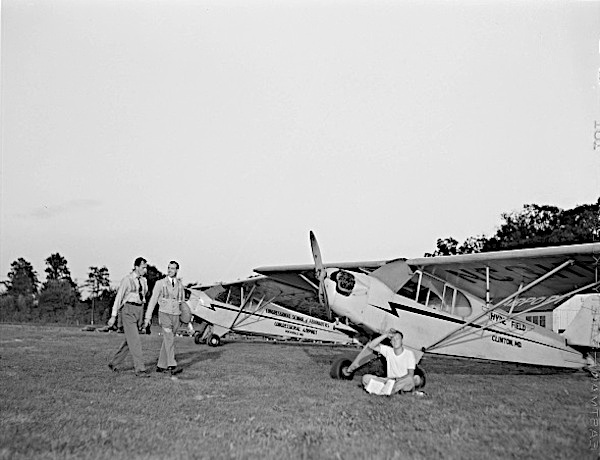
- Students of the Civilian Pilot Training Program at Congressional Airport
- IATA: none; ICAO: none

Summary
- Airport type: Defunct
- Location: Rockville, Maryland, U.S.
- Opened: 1928
- Closed: 1954
- Coordinates: 39.0611016°N 77.1263457°W

Map
- Location of airport in Maryland Congressional Airport (the United States)

Congressional Airport was a 40-acre (16 ha) airfield, located in what is now Rockville, Maryland, just outside Washington, D.C., used for the Civilian Pilot Training Program.

== History ==
=== Opening ===
Congressional Airport opened in 1928, intended for commercial flying service and a training school. Harry M. Horton was the head of the corporation, and Lieutenant John H. Tilton was chief pilot and head of flying operations. At the time, the location of the airport was called Halpine, Maryland; the area was later annexed by the City of Rockville. By May 1929, Younger Sales Company advertised that it was flying Heath Super Parasols out of Congressional Airport. That same month, the airport expanded, leasing land from the adjacent farm of Peter Wagner, making it one of the largest airfields in Maryland. An 80-by-120 foot concrete hangar was built in 1929. Flights over Great Falls were advertised for five dollars in July 1929.

Airport authorities requested to rezone two adjoining parcels of land from residential to commercial in order to build a fueling station and an administrative building for the airport, but the request was disapproved by the Board of Montgomery County Commissioners.

During World War II, the First Fighter Command of the United States Air Force closed the airport to civilian flying from August 1942 to June 1945, because it was within the vital defense area.

Capital Squadron 334 of the Civil Air Patrol operated at Congressional Airport.

=== Complaints ===
Nearby residents complained that pilots fly at low altitudes along Rockville Pike while approaching to land at the airport, causing a noise nuisance and an increasing the danger to residents. The United States Department of Commerce received more complaints about Congressional Airport than any other airstrip near Washington.

At the time, the Montgomery County Commissioners did not have the legal authority to regulate the operation of airfields located in the county. The airport was built before Maryland required airstrips to be licensed at the state level, so the Maryland State Aviation Commission could not restrict its flight paths or operating times.

In 1935, Maryland Governor Harry W. Nice signed a bill requiring all existing airstrips to apply for licenses and renew them every four years. The State Aviation Commission would be required to hold public hearings upon receipt of written protests from residents. Residents could also request an equity court proceeding in the event the license is renewed.

When Congressional Airport asked the State Aviation Commission how to apply for a license two weeks later, nearby residents immediately protested and requested a hearing. In response, the owners filed a demurrer in the Montgomery County Circuit Court, saying the proper venue for residents' complaints is at the state level not the county level. The owners also said the residents were guilty of laches because the residents allowed the airport to operate for many years before filing a legal complaint. The court sustained the demurrer, ending the lawsuit, and the State Aviation Commission ended up issuing a license to the airport.

In 1939, the Aviation Committee of the Maryland State Senate held a hearing about the residents' complaints. The State Aviation Commission defended its issuance of a license to Congressional Airport, saying that it could not disapprove the airport's application because the airport existed before the commission did. The state senatorial committee decided not to pursue further investigation of the Aviation Commission.

=== Record ===
In May 1936, Helen Richey, flying a light plane, set an international altitude record for aircraft weighing under 200 kilograms (440 lb). She reached 18,448 feet (5,623 m) during a flight from Congressional Airport to Endless Caverns Airport in New Market, Virginia. Richey flew the same plane that Benjamin King had flown to break the record previously.

=== Possible expansion ===
In 1938, Congressional Airport was one of several sites in consideration for the site of a commercial airport near Washington, D.C. Ultimately President Franklin D. Roosevelt instead chose to build the commercial airport at Gravely Point, which became National Airport.

=== Closing and redevelopment into a shopping center ===
The post-World War II flying boom collapsed in 1949, causing financial trouble for the airport. The land facing Rockville Pike was rezoned to commercial zoning in 1950, allowing portions of the airport's land to be sold for storage buildings in 1951. The flight school closed in 1951, although the airport itself continued to operate. In 1952, a lease to operate the airport was signed over to the Civil Air Patrol's Western Squadron.

In March 1953, the City of Rockville annexed 300 acres of land, including the airport itself. Most of the land was rezoned for residential apartments, townhouses, and single family houses.

Most of Congressional Airport's land was sold to a developer, the Rockville Land Company, Inc., in April 1954. The developer planned to build about apartment buildings, 160 townhouses, and 280 single family houses. Arthur Hyde, who had owned all of the airport's land since 1945, retained ownership of the commercially zoned strip of land along Rockville Pike.

In December 1955, it was announced that a 50-acre shopping center would be built on the former site of the airport. Named Congressional Plaza, it opened on March 12, 1959. It had a Giant Food, a J.C. Penney, and an S.S. Kresge.

On October 15, 1961, six black individuals asked to enter Congressional Plaza's skating rink. Workers at the skating rink refused to allow them to enter because of the rink's policy not to admit black people except during a private party. The six individuals were arrested for trespassing. All six were members of the Montgomery County chapter of the NAACP and residents of Rockville; one was a Christian minister. In 1962, Montgomery County enacted a law prohibiting racial discrimination in nearly all public accommodations. Two years later, President Lyndon Baines Johnson signed the Civil Rights Act of 1964, outlawing discrimination based on race, color, religion, or national origin in hotels, motels, restaurants, theaters, and all other public accommodations.

Today, Congressional Plaza is owned by Federal Realty. And a metro station is located behind the shopping mall, which opened on December 15, 1984.
