= Forecasting Division of Western Norway =

The Forecasting Division of Western Norway (Norwegian: Vêrvarslinga på Vestlandet) is a department of the Norwegian Meteorological Institute located in Bergen. It was established in 1918. It prepares weather forecasting for the area between northern Trøndelag and Lista, as well as the fishing grounds around The British Isles and Iceland.
