= Hyllestad Church =

Church in Vestland, Norway

- Hyllestad kyrkje
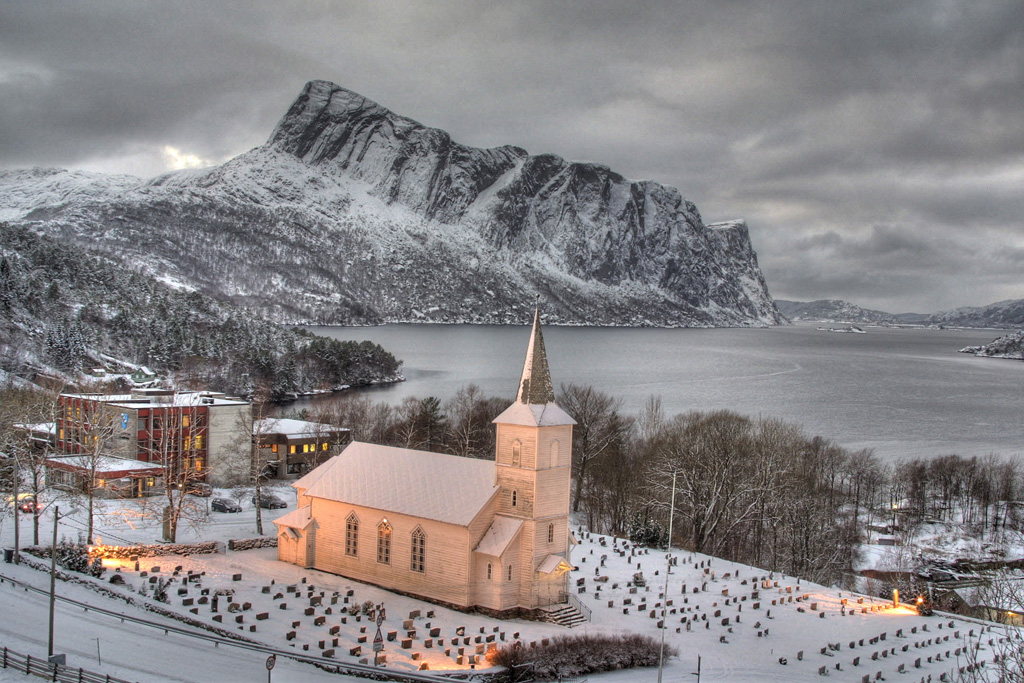
- View of the church
- Hyllestad Church
- 61.17101°N 5.29493°E
- Location: Hyllestad Municipality, Vestland
- Country: Norway
- Denomination: Church of Norway
- Churchmanship: Evangelical Lutheran

History
- Status: Parish church
- Founded: 12th century
- Consecrated: 23 November 1880

Architecture
- Functional status: Active
- Architect: Johannes Henrik Nissen
- Architectural type: Long church
- Completed: 1880 (146 years ago)

Specifications
- Capacity: 300
- Materials: Wood

Administration
- Diocese: Bjørgvin bispedømme
- Deanery: Sunnfjord prosti
- Parish: Hyllestad
- Norwegian Cultural Heritage Site
- Type: Church
- Status: Not protected
- ID: 84686

Hyllestad Church (Norwegian: Hyllestad kyrkje) is a parish church of the Church of Norway in Hyllestad Municipality in Vestland county, Norway. It is located in the village of Hyllestad. It is one of the three churches for the Hyllestad parish which is part of the Sunnfjord prosti (deanery) in the Diocese of Bjørgvin. The white, wooden church was built in a long church design in 1880 using plans drawn up by the architect Johannes Henrik Nissen. The church seats about 300 people.

== History ==
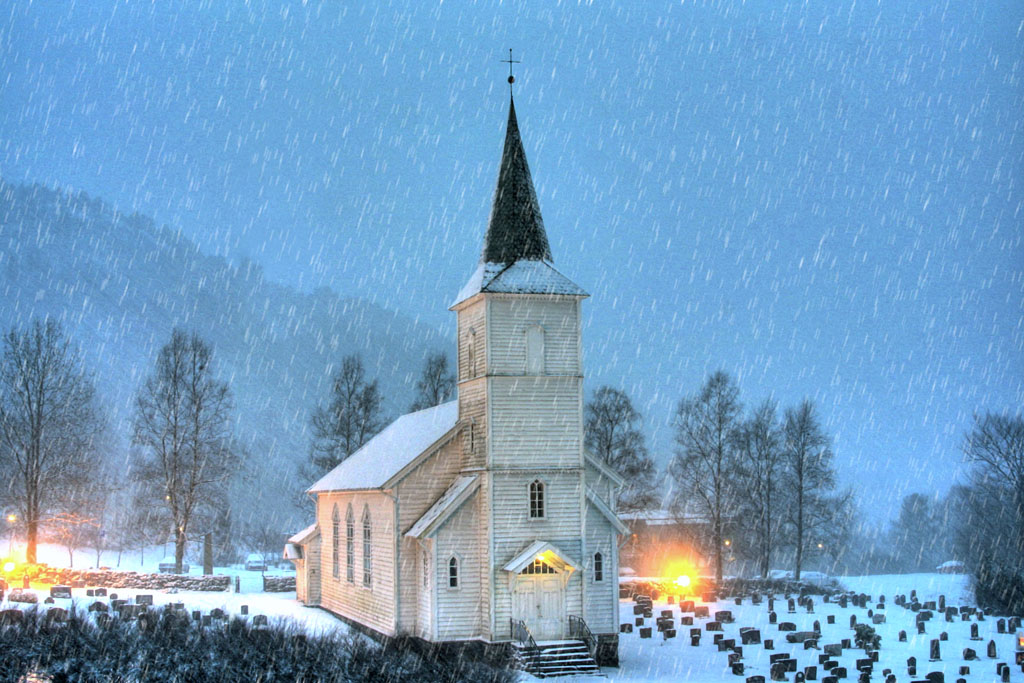
Hyllestad Church

The earliest existing historical records of the church date back to the year 1322, but the church was not new that year. Legend has it that Olav Kyrre may have built a church here in the 11th century, but there is no evidence to prove this. The first known church building in Hyllestad was likely a wooden stave church that was located at the Hyllestad farm, about 600 metres (0.37 mi) northeast of the present location at the foot of the mountain Kyrkjefjellet ("the church mountain"). The exact date of the original construction is not known, but the baptismal font in the church is dated from the 12th century, so it is quite possible the church was built at that time. In 1681, the old building was torn down and replaced by a timber-framed long church. The new church had a nave that measured 12 by 9 metres (39 ft × 30 ft) and a choir that measured 4.5 by 6 metres (15 ft × 20 ft). The church had a tower about the 3.1-by-6.5-metre (10 ft × 21 ft) church porch. In 1720, the church received a new tower spire.

By the mid- to late-1800s, the space at the old church site and cemetery was too small and could not be expanded. In 1880, a new church site was chosen at Myklebust, a little to the south of the old church site (where the present village of Hyllestad is located). The old church was torn down and the cemetery and stone fence that encircled the yard were left in place, but it was no longer used.

The new Hyllestad Church is a wooden, basilica style church. It was designed by Henrik Nissen and the lead builder was John Alver. The building was consecrated on 23 November 1880. Originally, the church was painted yellow on the exterior, but more recently it has been painted white.

== See also ==
- List of churches in Bjørgvin
