= Lihesten =

Mountain in Hyllestad, Norway

- Lifjellet
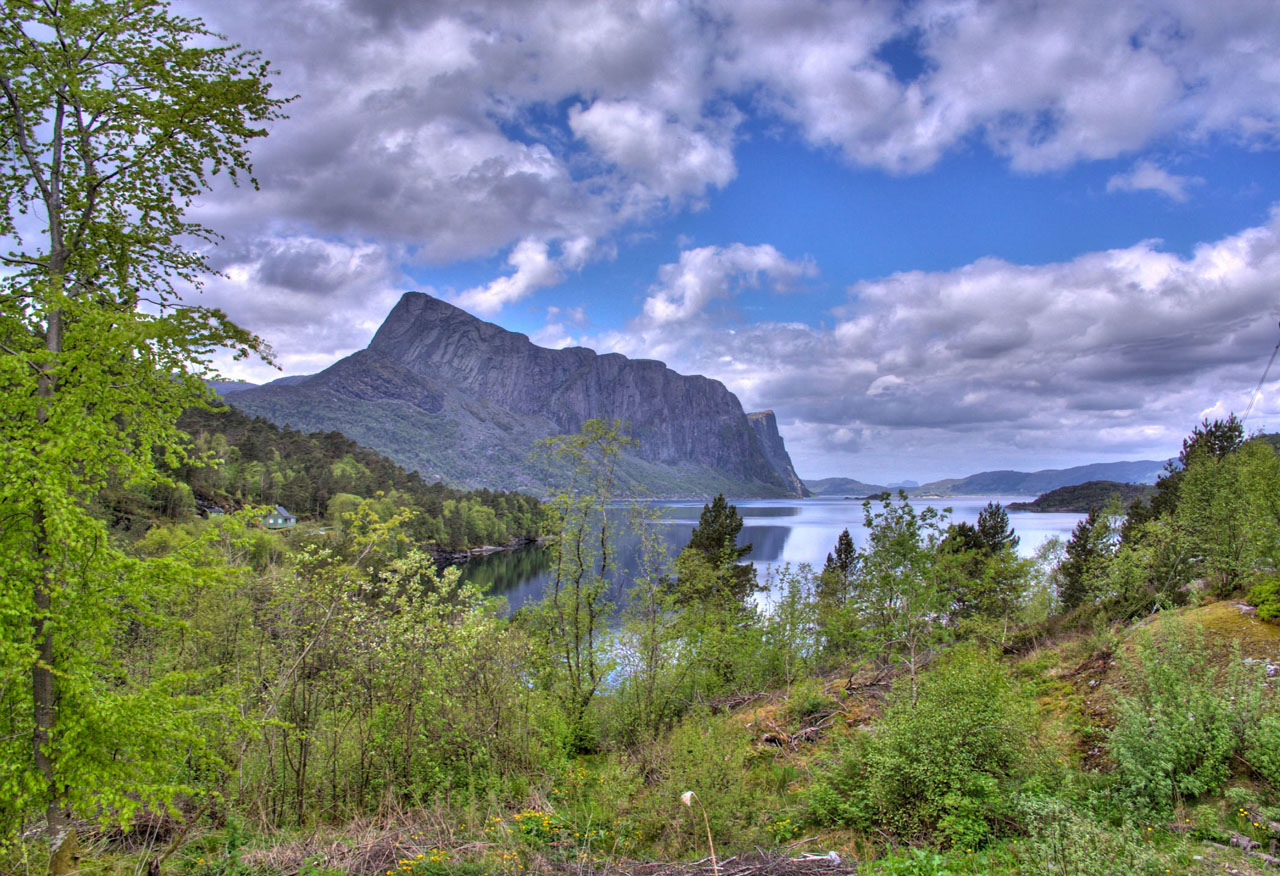
- Lihesten in the background

Highest point
- Elevation: 777 m (2,549 ft)
- Prominence: 679 m (2,228 ft)
- Isolation: 25.9 to 25.92 km (16.09 to 16.11 mi)
- Coordinates: 61.15896°N 5.16278°E

Geography
- Location: Vestland, Norway

Lihesten or Lifjellet is a 777-meter (2,549 ft) tall mountain ridge in Hyllestad Municipality in Vestland county, Norway. The mountain lies on a small peninsula between the Hyllestadfjorden and the Sognefjorden and it is the highest point in the municipality. The highest point on the ridge is Risnesnipa and the ridge runs for over 5 kilometres (3.1 mi) along the northwestern shore of the Lifjorden. The village of Hyllestad lies about 5 kilometres (3.1 mi) east of the mountain. It was the site of the Havørn Accident on 16 June 1936.

== See also ==
- List of mountains of Norway
