= Hyllestad Municipality =

Municipality in Vestland, Norway

Hyllestad Municipality Hyllestad kommune
- Municipality
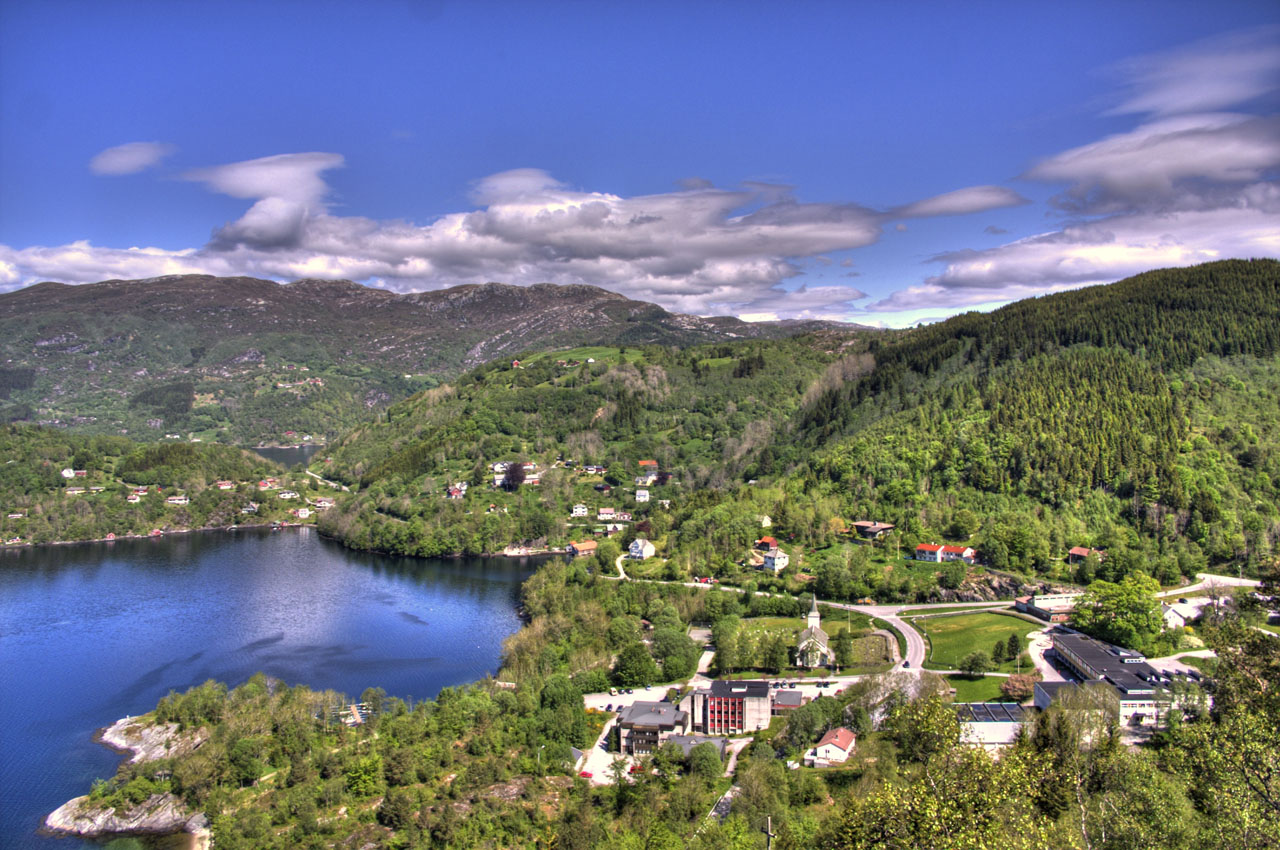
- View of the village of Hyllestad

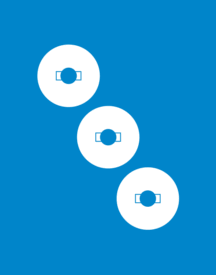
- Flag Coat of arms

- Vestland within Norway

- Hyllestad within Vestland
- Coordinates: 61°10′15″N 05°17′35″E
- Country: Norway
- County: Vestland
- District: Sogn
- Established: 1862
  - Preceded by: Askvoll and Lavik og Brekke
- Administrative centre: Hyllestad

Government
  - Mayor (2019): Kjell Eide (Ap)

Area
  - Total: 258.90 km^{2} (99.96 sq mi)
  - Land: 247.77 km^{2} (95.66 sq mi)
  - Water: 11.13 km^{2} (4.30 sq mi) 4.3%
  - Rank: #281 in Norway
- Highest elevation: 776.63 m (2,548.0 ft)

Population (2025)
  - Total: 1,281
  - Rank: #314 in Norway
  - Density: 4.9/km^{2} (13/sq mi)
  - Change (10 years): ▼ −8.8%
- Demonym: Hyllestadsokning

Official language
  - Norwegian form: Nynorsk
- Time zone: UTC+01:00 (CET)
  - Summer (DST): UTC+02:00 (CEST)
- ISO 3166 code: NO-4637
- Website: Official website

Hyllestad is a municipality in the county of Vestland, Norway. It is located in the traditional district of Sogn. The administrative center is the village of Hyllestad. Other villages in the municipality include Sørbøvågen and Leirvik. Hyllestad Municipality has existed since 1862 when it was created from parts of the neighboring Askvoll Municipality and Lavik og Brekke Municipality. The municipality is located on the north side of the Sognefjorden, near the mouth of the fjord.

The municipality, at 258.9 km^{2} (100.0 sq mi), is the 281st largest by area out of the 357 municipalities in Norway. Hyllestad Municipality is the 314th most populous municipality in Norway, with a population of 1,281. The municipality's population density is 4.9 inhabitants per square kilometre (13/sq mi) and its population has decreased by 8.8% over the previous 10-year period.

In 2016, the chief of police for Vestlandet formally suggested a reconfiguration of police districts and stations. He proposed that the police station in Hyllestad be closed.

In the fourth quarter of 2020, there were more than 400 employees at Havyard, a shipyard in Hyllestad.

== General information ==
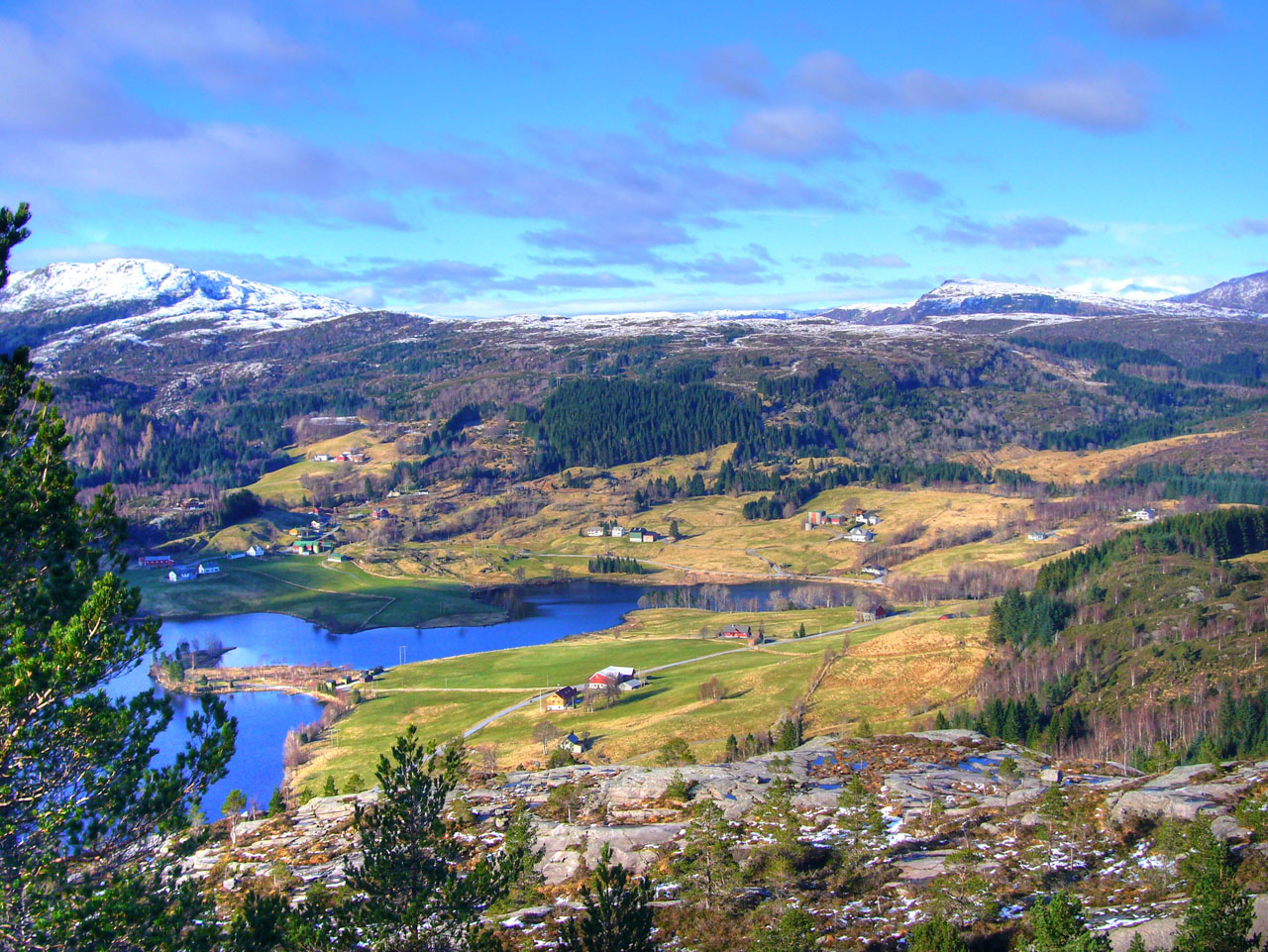
View of the Birkeland area

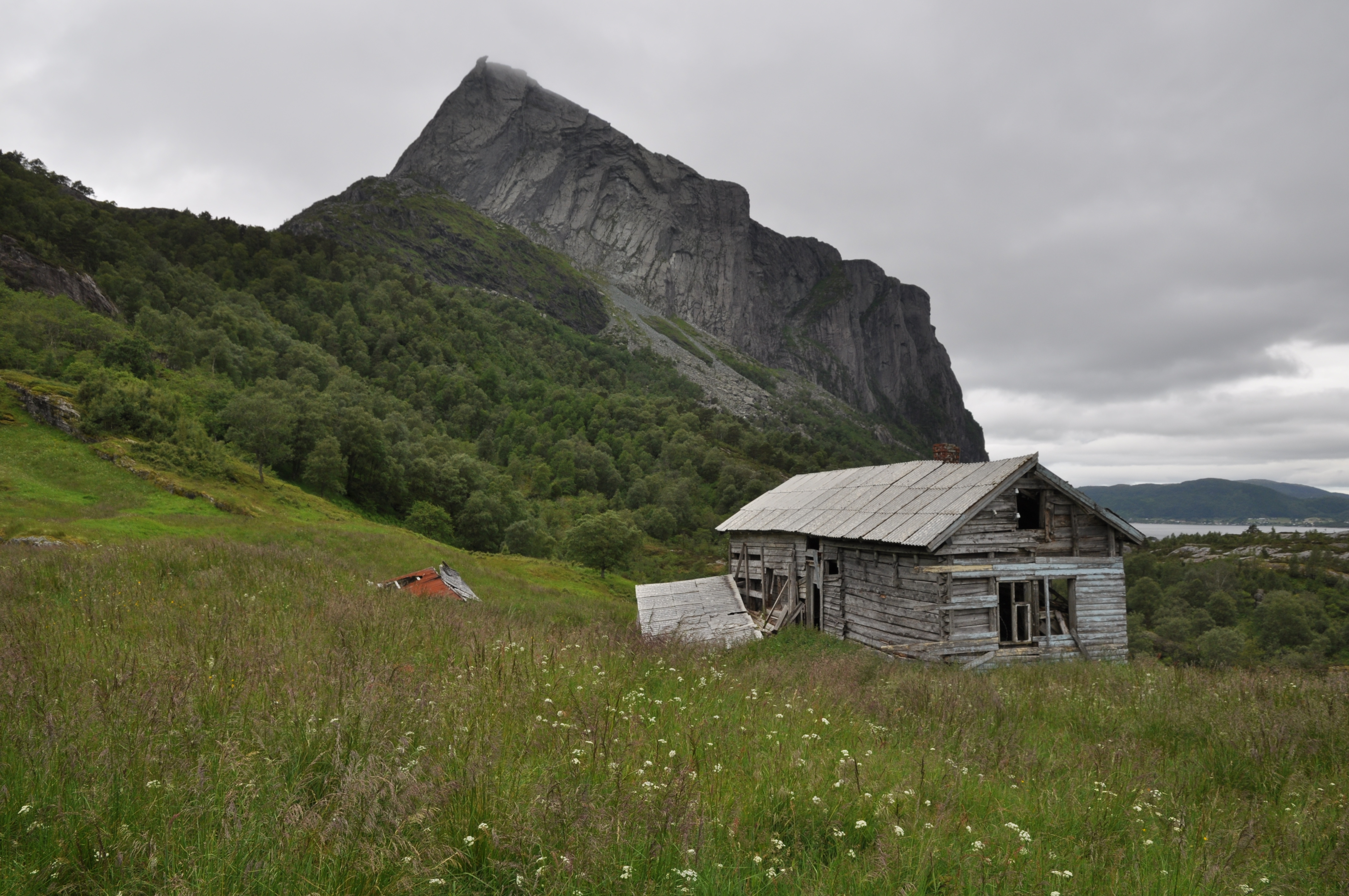
View of an abandoned building with Lihesten in the background

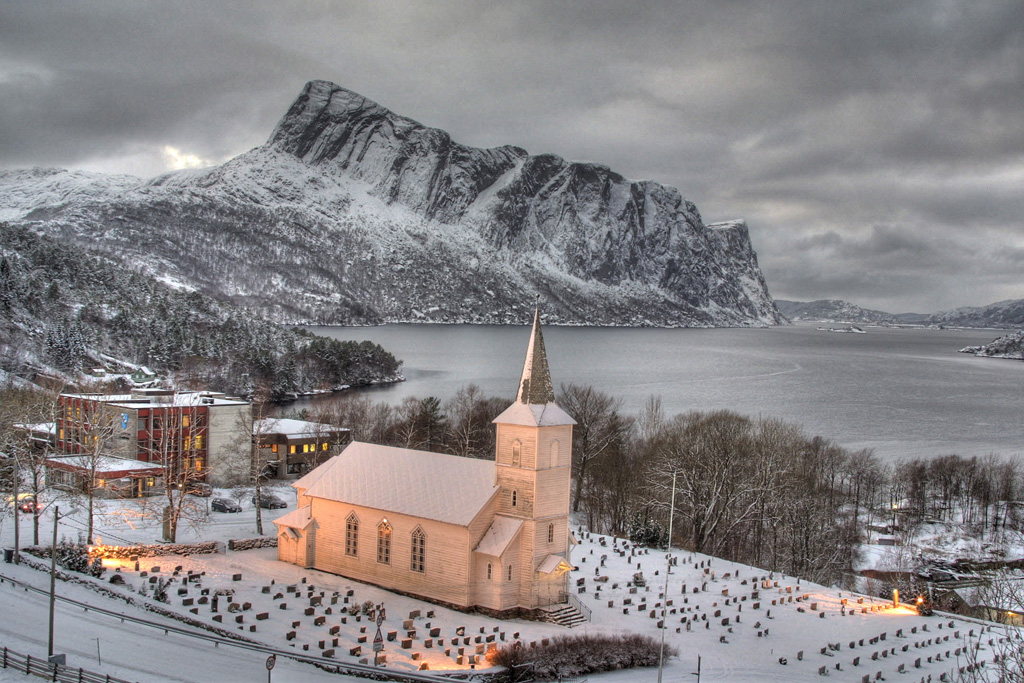
View of Hyllestad Church with Lihesten in the background

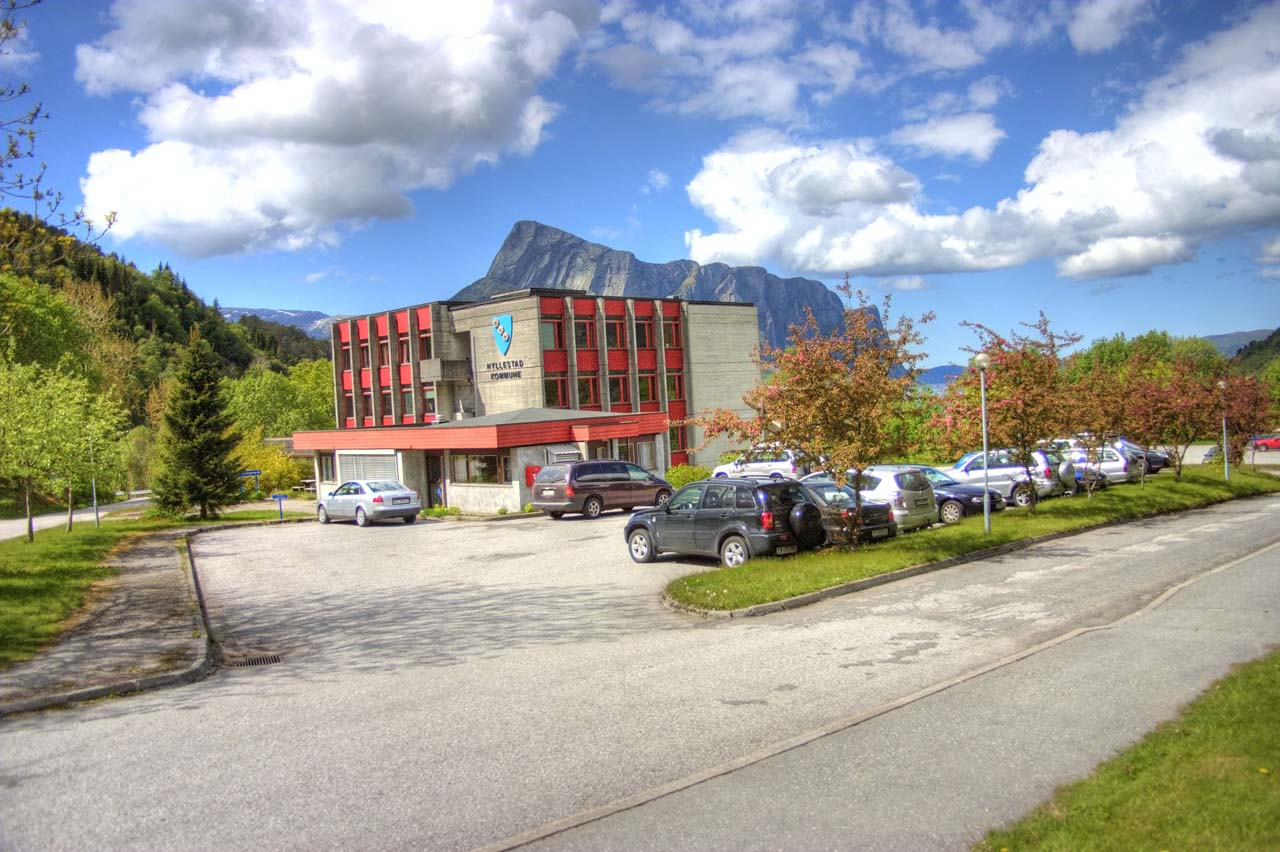
View of the municipal government building in Hyllestad

Hyllestad was created as a municipality in 1862. Two parishes (sokn) from Askvoll Municipality (Øn and Hyllestad) and one parish (sokn) from Lavik og Brekke Municipality (Bø) were merged to form the new Hyllestad Municipality. The initial population was 2,475. On 1 January 1888, the Krakken farm (population: 17) on the northeastern corner of the island of Sula was transferred from Hyllestad Municipality to the neighboring Utvær Municipality. The municipal boundaries have not changed since that time.

Historically, this municipality was part of the old Sogn og Fjordane county. On 1 January 2020, the municipality became a part of the newly-formed Vestland county (after Hordaland and Sogn og Fjordane counties were merged).

=== Name ===
The municipality (originally the parish) is named after the old Hyllestad farm (Old Norse: Hyllistaðir) since the first Hyllestad Church was built there. The first element comes from Hylli, the old uncompounded name of the nearby Hyllestadfjorden. This name is likely derived from the word hylli which means "quiet", "friendly", or "benevolent". The last element is the plural form of staðr which means "abode" or "town".

=== Coat of arms ===
The coat of arms was granted on 10 March 1989. The official blazon is "Azure, three millstones in bend argent" (Norwegian: På blå grunn tre sølv kvernsteinar i skrå rekkje). This means the arms have a blue field (background) and the charge is a set of three millstones lined up diagonally. The charge has a tincture of argent which means it is commonly colored white, but if it is made out of metal, then silver is used. The millstones were chosen because the production of millstones is the oldest industry in the municipality and has been very important to the life of the community. The arms were designed by Hans Berge. The municipal flag has the same design as the coat of arms.

=== Churches ===
The Church of Norway has one parish (sokn) within Hyllestad Municipality. It is part of the Sunnfjord prosti (deanery) in the Diocese of Bjørgvin.

Churches in Hyllestad Municipality
Parish (sokn)	Church name	Location of the church	Year built
Hyllestad	Bø Church	Leirvik	1868
Hyllestad	Hyllestad Church	Hyllestad	1880
Hyllestad	Øn Church	Sørbøvågen	1958

== Government ==
Hyllestad Municipality is responsible for primary education (through 10th grade), outpatient health services, senior citizen services, welfare and other social services, zoning, economic development, and municipal roads and utilities. The municipality is governed by a municipal council of directly elected representatives. The mayor is indirectly elected by a vote of the municipal council. The municipality is under the jurisdiction of the Sogn og Fjordane District Court and the Gulating Court of Appeal.

=== Municipal council ===
The municipal council (Kommunestyre) of Hyllestad Municipality is made up of 17 representatives that are elected to four year terms. The tables below show the current and historical composition of the council by political party.

Hyllestad kommunestyre 2023–2027
Party name (in Nynorsk)	Number of representatives
Labour Party (Arbeidarpartiet)	9
Conservative Party (Høgre)	3
Centre Party (Senterpartiet)	5
Total number of members:	17

Hyllestad kommunestyre 2019–2023
Party name (in Nynorsk)	Number of representatives
Labour Party (Arbeidarpartiet)	6
Conservative Party (Høgre)	3
Christian Democratic Party (Kristeleg Folkeparti)	1
Centre Party (Senterpartiet)	7
Total number of members:	17

Hyllestad kommunestyre 2015–2019
Party name (in Nynorsk)	Number of representatives
Labour Party (Arbeidarpartiet)	6
Conservative Party (Høgre)	4
Christian Democratic Party (Kristeleg Folkeparti)	1
Centre Party (Senterpartiet)	6
Total number of members:	17

Hyllestad kommunestyre 2011–2015
Party name (in Nynorsk)	Number of representatives
Labour Party (Arbeidarpartiet)	5
Conservative Party (Høgre)	3
Centre Party (Senterpartiet)	5
Collaborative List (Samlingslista)	4
Total number of members:	17

Hyllestad kommunestyre 2007–2011
Party name (in Nynorsk)	Number of representatives
Labour Party (Arbeidarpartiet)	5
Conservative Party (Høgre)	2
Christian Democratic Party (Kristeleg Folkeparti)	2
Centre Party (Senterpartiet)	5
Common list (Samlingslista)	3
Total number of members:	17

Hyllestad kommunestyre 2003–2007
Party name (in Nynorsk)	Number of representatives
Labour Party (Arbeidarpartiet)	8
Centre Party (Senterpartiet)	9
Common list (Samlingslista)	4
Total number of members:	21

Hyllestad kommunestyre 1999–2003
Party name (in Nynorsk)	Number of representatives
Labour Party (Arbeidarpartiet)	6
Centre Party (Senterpartiet)	9
Common list (Samlingslista)	6
Total number of members:	21

Hyllestad kommunestyre 1995–1999
Party name (in Nynorsk)	Number of representatives
Labour Party (Arbeidarpartiet)	6
Centre Party (Senterpartiet)	9
Common list (Samlingslista)	6
Total number of members:	21

Hyllestad kommunestyre 1991–1995
Party name (in Nynorsk)	Number of representatives
Labour Party (Arbeidarpartiet)	5
Conservative Party (Høgre)	2
Christian Democratic Party (Kristeleg Folkeparti)	1
Centre Party (Senterpartiet)	13
Total number of members:	21

Hyllestad kommunestyre 1987–1991
Party name (in Nynorsk)	Number of representatives
Labour Party (Arbeidarpartiet)	6
Conservative Party (Høgre)	4
Christian Democratic Party (Kristeleg Folkeparti)	2
Centre Party (Senterpartiet)	7
Liberal Party (Venstre)	2
Total number of members:	21

Hyllestad kommunestyre 1983–1987
Party name (in Nynorsk)	Number of representatives
Labour Party (Arbeidarpartiet)	6
Conservative Party (Høgre)	4
Christian Democratic Party (Kristeleg Folkeparti)	2
Centre Party (Senterpartiet)	6
Liberal Party (Venstre)	3
Total number of members:	21

Hyllestad kommunestyre 1979–1983
Party name (in Nynorsk)	Number of representatives
Labour Party (Arbeidarpartiet)	5
Conservative Party (Høgre)	3
Christian Democratic Party (Kristeleg Folkeparti)	3
Joint list of the Liberal Party (Venstre) and New People's Party (Nye Folkepartiet)	4
Village list for Øn (Bygdeliste for Øn)	3
Common list for Hyllestad and Bø (Samlingsliste for Hyllestad og Bø)	3
Total number of members:	21

Hyllestad kommunestyre 1975–1979
Party name (in Nynorsk)	Number of representatives
Labour Party (Arbeidarpartiet)	5
Christian Democratic Party (Kristeleg Folkeparti)	5
New People's Party (Nye Folkepartiet)	1
Centre Party (Senterpartiet)	7
Local list for Øen (Bygdelista for Øen)	3
Total number of members:	21

Hyllestad kommunestyre 1971–1975
Party name (in Nynorsk)	Number of representatives
Labour Party (Arbeidarpartiet)	3
Joint List(s) of Non-Socialist Parties (Borgarlege Felleslister)	5
Local List(s) (Lokale lister)	13
Total number of members:	21

Hyllestad kommunestyre 1967–1971
Party name (in Nynorsk)	Number of representatives
Labour Party (Arbeidarpartiet)	7
Joint List(s) of Non-Socialist Parties (Borgarlege Felleslister)	9
Local List(s) (Lokale lister)	5
Total number of members:	21

Hyllestad kommunestyre 1963–1967
Party name (in Nynorsk)	Number of representatives
Labour Party (Arbeidarpartiet)	7
Liberal Party (Venstre)	3
Joint List(s) of Non-Socialist Parties (Borgarlege Felleslister)	11
Total number of members:	21

Hyllestad heradsstyre 1959–1963
Party name (in Nynorsk)	Number of representatives
Labour Party (Arbeidarpartiet)	5
Liberal Party (Venstre)	3
Joint List(s) of Non-Socialist Parties (Borgarlege Felleslister)	13
Total number of members:	21

Hyllestad heradsstyre 1955–1959
Party name (in Nynorsk)	Number of representatives
Labour Party (Arbeidarpartiet)	8
Liberal Party (Venstre)	3
Joint List(s) of Non-Socialist Parties (Borgarlege Felleslister)	9
Local List(s) (Lokale lister)	1
Total number of members:	21

Hyllestad heradsstyre 1951–1955
Party name (in Nynorsk)	Number of representatives
Labour Party (Arbeidarpartiet)	11
Liberal Party (Venstre)	5
Joint List(s) of Non-Socialist Parties (Borgarlege Felleslister)	12
Total number of members:	28

Hyllestad heradsstyre 1947–1951
Party name (in Nynorsk)	Number of representatives
Labour Party (Arbeidarpartiet)	6
Farmers' Party (Bondepartiet)	3
Liberal Party (Venstre)	3
List of workers, fishermen, and small farmholders (Arbeidarar, fiskarar, småbrukarar liste)	3
Joint List(s) of Non-Socialist Parties (Borgarlege Felleslister)	13
Total number of members:	28

Hyllestad heradsstyre 1945–1947
Party name (in Nynorsk)	Number of representatives
Labour Party (Arbeidarpartiet)	5
Liberal Party (Venstre)	3
List of workers, fishermen, and small farmholders (Arbeidarar, fiskarar, småbrukarar liste)	7
Joint List(s) of Non-Socialist Parties (Borgarlege Felleslister)	7
Local List(s) (Lokale lister)	6
Total number of members:	28

Hyllestad heradsstyre 1937–1941*
Party name (in Nynorsk)	Number of representatives
Labour Party (Arbeidarpartiet)	6
Farmers' Party (Bondepartiet)	3
List of workers, fishermen, and small farmholders (Arbeidarar, fiskarar, småbrukarar liste)	3
Joint List(s) of Non-Socialist Parties (Borgarlege Felleslister)	6
Local List(s) (Lokale lister)	10
Total number of members:	28
Note: Due to the German occupation of Norway during World War II, no elections were held for new municipal councils until after the war ended in 1945.

=== Mayors ===
The mayors (Nynorsk: ordførar) of Hyllestad Municipality:

- 1862–1862: Andreas Jacobsen Salbue
- 1862–1865: Henrik Johannesen Sørebø
- 1866–1893: Johan Henrik Wolff
- 1894–1916: Johannes Ottesen
- 1917–1919: Olai Haugland
- 1920–1928: Jonas Sørefjord
- 1929–1934: Andreas Gjertsen
- 1935–1937: Sivert Holten
- 1938–1955: Hans A. Risnes
- 1956–1959: Magnus Lundeland (Ap)
- 1960–1966: Olav Bruknap (Sp)
- 1966–1967: Sigurd Giil (Sp)
- 1968–1971: Leif Hatlem (Sp)
- 1972–1979: Bendik Systad (Sp)
- 1980–1981: Ingemar Nordstrand (V)
- 1982–1985: Per Bygnes (Sp)
- 1986–1987: Hans Berge (H)
- 1988–1993: Håkon Giil (Sp)
- 1993–1995: Astrid Waage (Sp)
- 1995–2007: Harry Mowatt (Ap)
- 2007–2011: Tore Bråstad (Sp)
- 2011–2015: Jan Olav Gjerde (Ap)
- 2015–2019: Morten Askvik (Sp)
- 2019–present: Kjell Eide (Ap)

== Geography ==
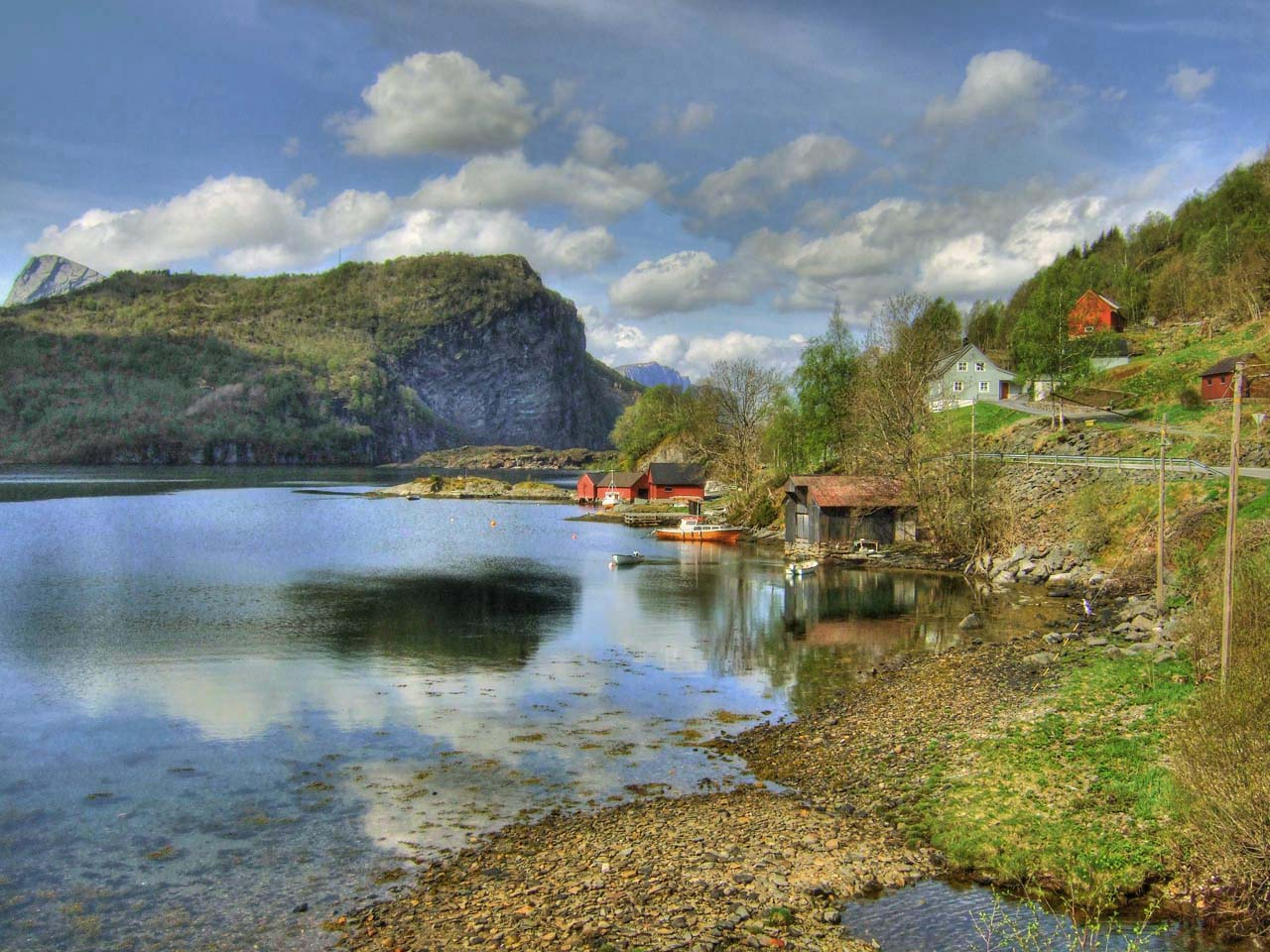
View of the Rønset area

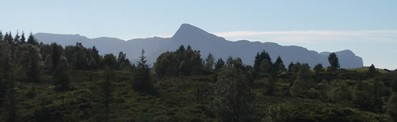
Lihesten (mountain in Hyllestad)

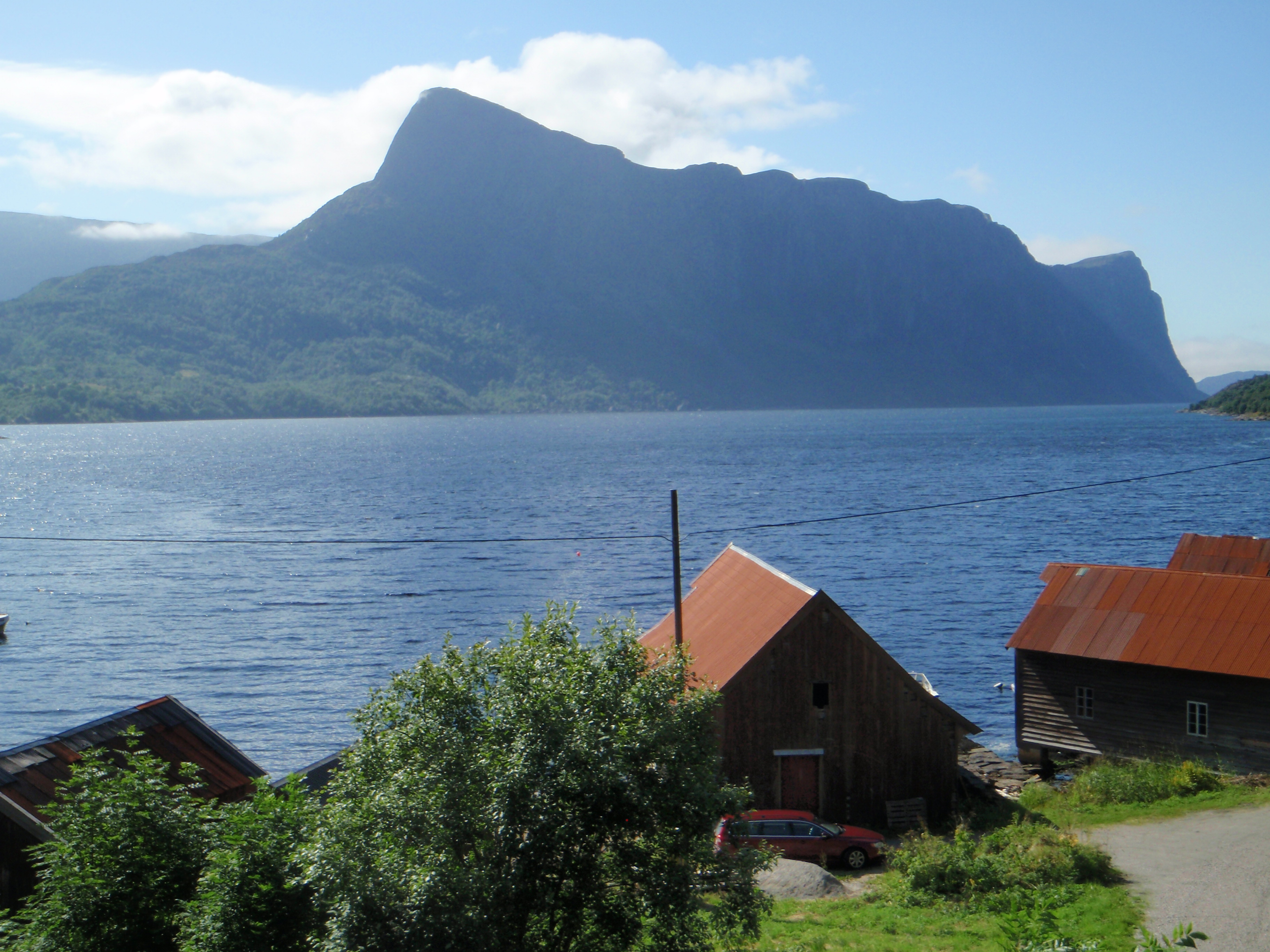
Another view of Lihesten

Hyllestad is located north of the Sognefjorden along the Åfjorden/Hyllestadfjorden, which flows through the middle of the municipality. Hyllestad is bordered to the north by Fjaler Municipality, to the east by Høyanger Municipality, to the south (across the fjord) by Gulen Municipality, and to the west by Solund Municipality. The highest point in the municipality is the 776.63-metre (2,548.0 ft) tall mountain peak Ripesnipa, located on the Lihesten mountain ridge.

== Attractions ==
=== Kvernsteins Millstone Park ===
The production of millstones in Hyllestad started over 1,000 years ago and used to be a major industry employing up to 1,000 people. Millstones were exported to Denmark, the Baltic Sea region, and across Norway. Many of the stone crosses to be seen along the coast are made from millstones from Hyllestad, including the crosses in Eivindvik and Korssund. The park offers nature trails that visualize the history of the industry, with debris, broken product, and half-carved stones still not separated from the rock surface. At the stonemason camp there is a guided tour of the historic stone quarry in the mill stone park and a visit to Åfjordstein where you can see how mill stones are used in a modern, new design.

=== Lihesten ===
The highest mountain in the municipality, Lihesten, is one of the most prominent mountains ridges on the coast of Norway. There are several marked routes to the peak, over 714 m (2,343 ft) above sea level, with views both straight out to the open sea and inwards over the fjords. Lihesten also has a number of good fishing lakes.

=== Trondheim Postal Road ===
Many bicyclists have described the well-preserved section of the Trondheim postal road between Hyllestad Municipality and Fjaler Municipality as one of the most exhilarating cycling experiences in the country. There were originally 19 stone bridges on the route between the villages of Dale and Leirvik, and many of them are still standing as proud and impressive examples of early dry masonry. There are only a few places along the 40 km (25 mi) stretch between Dale in Fjaler and Leirvik in Hyllestad where the surface is so uneven that it is best to push a bike rather than ride it. Occasionally it is necessary to join the paved road (Fylkesvei 57), but most of the route is free from cars and idyllic.

=== Water Mills ===
On the postroad, by Skor, lies a cluster of five newly renovated gristmills.

== Notable people ==
- Anfin Øen (1868–1928), a bailiff and politician
- Ivar Tveit (1880–1952), a newspaper editor
- Håkon Steinar Giil (born 1943), a politician and former mayor of Hyllestad Municipality from 1987 to 1993
