= Lavik og Brekke Municipality =

Former municipality in Sogn og Fjordane, Norway

Lavik og Brekke Municipality Lavik og Brekke herad
- Former municipality
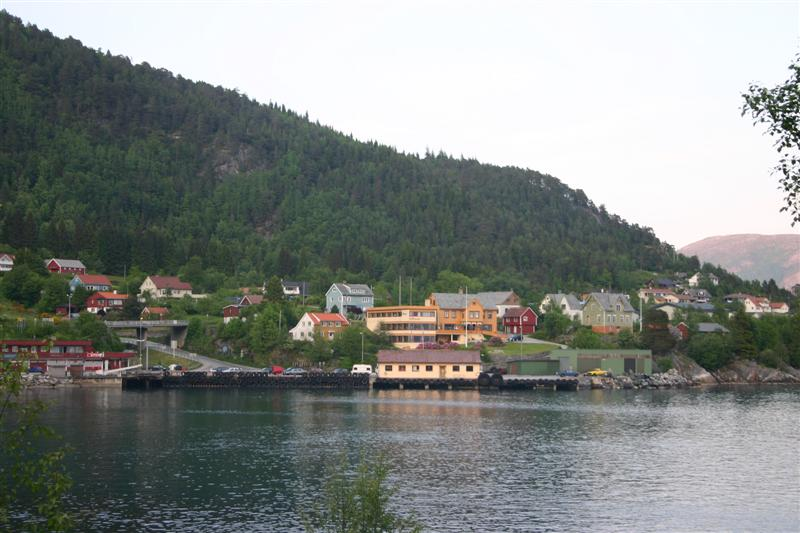
- View of Lavik village

- Sogn og Fjordane within Norway

- Lavik og Brekke within Sogn og Fjordane
- Coordinates: 61°06′17″N 05°30′37″E
- Country: Norway
- County: Sogn og Fjordane
- District: Sogn
- Established: 1 Jan 1861
  - Preceded by: Lavik and Brekke municipalities
- Disestablished: 1 Jan 1905
  - Succeeded by: Lavik and Brekke municipalities
- Administrative centre: Lavik

Government
  - Mayor (1902–1904): Berge Instefjord

Area (upon dissolution)
  - Total: 425.2 km^{2} (164.2 sq mi)
- Highest elevation: 884 m (2,900 ft)

Population (1905)
  - Total: 2,164
  - Density: 5.1/km^{2} (13/sq mi)

Official language
  - Norwegian form: Nynorsk
- Time zone: UTC+01:00 (CET)
  - Summer (DST): UTC+02:00 (CEST)
- ISO 3166 code: NO-1415

Lavik og Brekke is a former municipality in the old Sogn og Fjordane county, Norway. The 425-square-kilometre (164 sq mi) municipality existed from 1861 until its dissolution in 1905. The area is now divided between Gulen Municipality and Høyanger Municipality in the traditional district of Sogn in Vestland county. The administrative centre was the village of Lavik. Other villages in the municipality included Brekke, Oppedal, and Instefjord.

Prior to its dissolution in 1904, the 425.2-square-kilometre (164.2 sq mi) municipality had a population of about 2,164. The municipality's population density was 5.1 inhabitants per square kilometre (13/sq mi) and its population had increased by % over the previous 10-year period.

== General information ==
Lavik og Brekke Municipaltiy was established as a municipality in 1861 upon the merger of Lavik Municipality (population: 926) and Brekke Municipality (population: 898), which were both located along the Sognefjorden. The new municipality had an initial population of 1,824.

On 1 January 1875, a part of Klævold Municipality to the west (population: 90) was transferred to Lavik og Brekke Municipality.

On 1 January 1905, Lavik og Brekke Municipality (population: 2,164) was divided, reverting to the pre-1861 borders (except for the small change in 1875) and re-creating Lavik Municipality (population: 1,182) and Brekke Municipality (population: 982) as separate municipalities once again. Later, in 1964, Lavik Municipality became part of the new Høyanger Municipality and Brekke Municipality joined Gulen Municipality.

=== Name ===
The municipal name Lavik og Brekke (lit. 'Lavik and Brekke') was created as a compound name by combining the names of the two predecessor municipalities.

The first name comes from the old Lavik farm (Old Norse: Lámvíkum) since the first Lavik Church was built there. The first element has an uncertain meaning. One possibility is that it comes from the word hlað which means "pile" or "stack". The last element likely comes from the word vík which means "inlet" or "cove". Historically the spelling has varied greatly. It was Laduigh in the 16th century, Laduig in the 17th century, Ladvig in the 18th century, Ladevig in the 19th century, and finally Lavik in the 20th century.

The second name comes from the old Brekke farm (Old Norse: Brekka) since the first Brekke Church was built there. The name is identical to the word brekka which means "slope". Historically, the spelling of the name was not formalized until the 1800s, so spellings such as Breche, Bræcke, and Brække were also used.

=== Churches ===
The Church of Norway had two parishes (sokn) within Lavik og Brekke Municipality. At the time of the municipal dissolution, it was part of the Lavik prestegjeld and the Ytre Sogn prosti (deanery) in the Diocese of Bjørgvin.

Churches in Lavik og Brekke Municipality
Parish (sokn)	Church name	Location of the church	Year built
Lavik	Lavik Church	Lavik	1865
Brekke	Brekke Church	Brekke	1862

== Geography ==
The municipality was located in the outer Sogn region, on both the north and south side of the Sognefjorden. The municipality was located along the Sognefjorden, at the western end of the fjord, just east of the mouth. The highest point in the municipality was the 887-metre (2,910 ft) tall mountain Blyfjellet, located on the southeastern border with Kyrkjebø Municipality.

Fjaler Municipality was located to the north, Kyrkjebø Municipality was located to the east, Masfjorden Municipality (in Hordaland county) was located to the south, Evindvig Municipality was located to the southwest, and Hyllestad Municipality was located to the northwest.

== Government ==
While it existed, Lavik og Brekke Municipality was governed by a municipal council of directly elected representatives. The mayor was indirectly elected by a vote of the municipal council.

=== Mayors ===
The mayor (Nynorsk: ordførar) of Lavik og Brekke Municipality was the political leader of the municipality and the chairperson of the municipal council. The following people held this position:

- 1861–1862: Peder Fredrik Hartwig
- 1863–1872: Lasse Ellingson
- 1873–1875: Bendiks J. Mølmesdal
- 1876–1877: Peder Fredrik Hartwig
- 1878–1883: Matias Ellingsen
- 1884–1889: Mons H. Oppedal
- 1890–1901: Lasse J. Wergeland
- 1902–1904: Berge Instefjord

== See also ==
- List of former municipalities of Norway
