= Brekke Municipality =

Former municipality in Sogn og Fjordane, Norway

Brekke Municipality Brekke herad
- Former municipality
- Brække herred (historic name)
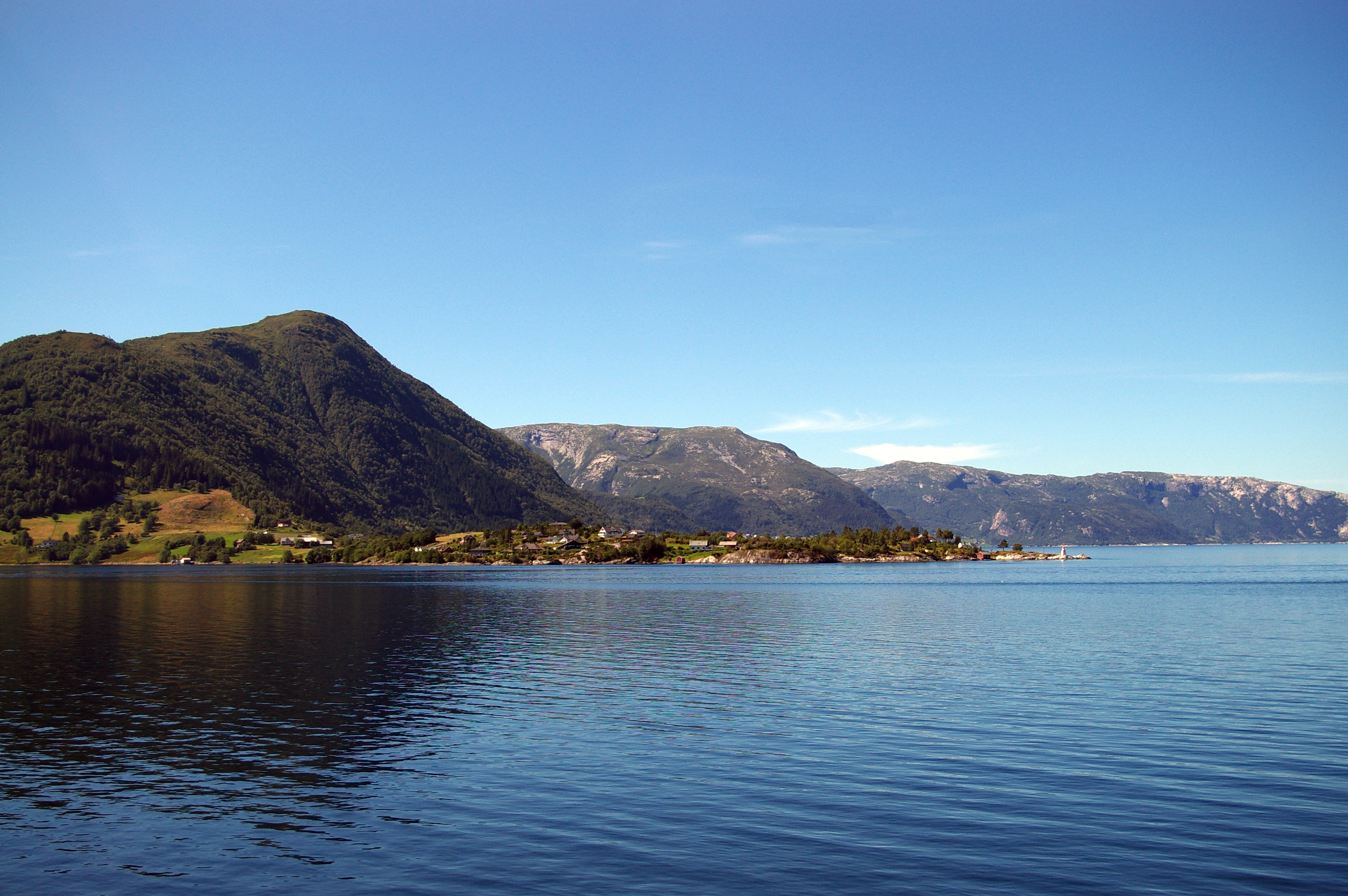
- View of the village of Brekke

- Sogn og Fjordane within Norway

- Brekke within Sogn og Fjordane
- Coordinates: 61°01′07″N 05°27′41″E
- Country: Norway
- County: Sogn og Fjordane
- District: Sogn
- Established: 1850
  - Preceded by: Evenvig Municipality
- Disestablished: 1 Jan 1861
  - Succeeded by: Lavik og Brekke Municipality
- Re-established: 1 Jan 1905
  - Preceded by: Lavik og Brekke Municipality
- Disestablished: 1 Jan 1964
  - Succeeded by: Gulen Municipality
- Administrative centre: Brekke

Government
  - Mayor (1959–1963): Tormod Tynning

Area (upon dissolution)
  - Total: 185.6 km^{2} (71.7 sq mi)
  - Rank: #392 in Norway
- Highest elevation: 877.44 m (2,878.7 ft)

Population (1963)
  - Total: 782
  - Rank: #647 in Norway
  - Density: 4.2/km^{2} (11/sq mi)
  - Change (10 years): ▼ −6.8%

Official language
  - Norwegian form: Nynorsk
- Time zone: UTC+01:00 (CET)
  - Summer (DST): UTC+02:00 (CEST)
- ISO 3166 code: NO-1414

Brekke is a former municipality in the old Sogn og Fjordane county, Norway. The 185.6-square-kilometre (71.7 sq mi) municipality existed from 1850 until its dissolution in 1861 and again from 1905 until its dissolution in 1964. The area is now part of Gulen Municipality in the traditional district of Sogn in Vestland county. The administrative centre was the village of Brekke. Other villages in the municipality included Oppedal and Instefjord.

Prior to its dissolution in 1964, the 185.6-square-kilometre (71.7 sq mi) municipality was the 392nd largest by area out of the 689 municipalities in Norway. Brekke Municipality was the 647th most populous municipality in Norway with a population of about 782. The municipality's population density was 4.2 inhabitants per square kilometre (11/sq mi) and its population had decreased by 6.8% over the previous 10-year period.

== General information ==
=== Establishment ===
The parish of Brekke was originally established as a municipality in 1850 when it was split off from the large Evindvig Municipality. Initially, Brekke Municipality had a population of 898. In 1861, Brekke Municipality (population: 898) was merged with neighboring Lavik Municipality (population: 926) to form the new Lavik og Brekke Municipality.

On 1 January 1875, a part of Klævold Municipality (population: 90) was transferred to Lavik og Brekke Municipality. On 1 January 1905, Lavik og Brekke Municipality (population: 2,164) was divided, reverting to the pre-1861 borders (except for the small change in 1875) and re-creating Lavik Municipality (population: 1,182) and Brekke Municipality (population: 982) as separate municipalities once again.

During the 1960s, there were many municipal mergers across Norway due to the work of the Schei Committee. On 1 January 1964, Brekke Municipality (population: 782) was merged with the neighboring Gulen Municipality (population: 2,468), creating a new, larger Gulen Municipality.

=== Name ===
The municipality (originally the parish) is named after the old Brekke farm (Old Norse: Brekka) since the first Brekke Church was built there. The name is identical to the word brekka which means "slope". Historically, the spelling of the name was not formalized until the 1800s, so spellings such as Breche, Bræcke, and Brække were also used.

=== Churches ===
The Church of Norway had one parish (sokn) within Brekke Municipality. At the time of the municipal dissolution, it was part of the Lavik prestegjeld and the Ytre Sogn prosti (deanery) in the Diocese of Bjørgvin.

Churches in Brekke Municipality
Parish (sokn)	Church name	Location of the church	Year built
Brekke	Brekke Church	Brekke	1862

== Geography ==
The municipality was located in the outer Sogn region, on the south side of the Sognefjorden and centered around the Risnesfjorden, a fjord arm that reaches to the south from the main fjord. The highest point in the municipality was the 877.44-metre (2,878.7 ft) tall mountain Svadfjellet, located in the southeastern part of the municipality, near the border with Masfjorden Municipality.

Lavik Municipality was located to the north and east, Masfjorden Municipality (in Hordaland county) was located to the south, Gulen Municipality was located to the west, and Hyllestad Municipality was located to the northwest.

== Government ==
While it existed, Brekke Municipality was responsible for primary education (through 10th grade), outpatient health services, senior citizen services, welfare and other social services, zoning, economic development, and municipal roads and utilities. The municipality was governed by a municipal council of directly elected representatives. The mayor was indirectly elected by a vote of the municipal council. The municipality was under the jurisdiction of the Gulating Court of Appeal.

=== Municipal council ===
The municipal council (Heradsstyre) of Brekke Municipality was made up of 13 representatives that were elected to four year terms. The tables below show the historical composition of the council by political party.

Brekke heradsstyre 1959–1963
Party name (in Nynorsk)	Number of representatives
Labour Party (Arbeidarpartiet)	2
Centre Party (Senterpartiet)	7
Liberal Party (Venstre)	4
Total number of members:	13

Brekke heradsstyre 1955–1959
Party name (in Nynorsk)	Number of representatives
Labour Party (Arbeidarpartiet)	2
Farmers' Party (Bondepartiet)	5
Liberal Party (Venstre)	6
Total number of members:	13

Brekke heradsstyre 1951–1955
Party name (in Nynorsk)	Number of representatives
Labour Party (Arbeidarpartiet)	3
Joint List(s) of Non-Socialist Parties (Borgarlege Felleslister)	8
Local List(s) (Lokale lister)	1
Total number of members:	12

Brekke heradsstyre 1947–1951
Party name (in Nynorsk)	Number of representatives
Labour Party (Arbeidarpartiet)	3
Joint List(s) of Non-Socialist Parties (Borgarlege Felleslister)	9
Total number of members:	12

Brekke heradsstyre 1945–1947
Party name (in Nynorsk)	Number of representatives
Labour Party (Arbeidarpartiet)	2
Farmers' Party (Bondepartiet)	2
Liberal Party (Venstre)	2
Local List(s) (Lokale lister)	6
Total number of members:	12

Brekke heradsstyre 1937–1941*
Party name (in Nynorsk)	Number of representatives
Labour Party (Arbeidarpartiet)	6
Joint List(s) of Non-Socialist Parties (Borgarlege Felleslister)	5
Local List(s) (Lokale lister)	1
Total number of members:	12
Note: Due to the German occupation of Norway during World War II, no elections were held for new municipal councils until after the war ended in 1945.

=== Mayors ===
The mayor (Nynorsk: ordførar) of Brekke Municipality was the political leader of the municipality and the chairperson of the municipal council. The following people held this position:

- 1850–1855: Ola Mathiasson Asheim
- 1856–1859: Lasse Hermundson Fram-Brekke
- (1861–1905: Brekke Municipality was part of Lavik og Brekke Municipality)
- 1905–1910: Johannes L. Wergeland
- 1911–1916: Ivar Sjurson Haugland
- 1917–1919: Ola K. Indre Oppedal
- 1920–1922: Mons Hanson Ytre Takle
- 1923–1925: Ola K. Indre Oppedal
- 1926–1928: Mons Hanson Ytre Takle
- 1929–1931: Ola K. Indre Oppedal
- 1932–1934: Mons Hanson Ytre Takle
- 1935–1937: Sjur I. Haugland
- 1938–1943: Nils R. Dale
- 1943–1945: Berner Ellingsen
- 1945–1945: Nils R. Dale
- 1946–1959: Torvald Hjellum
- 1959–1963: Tormod Tynning

== Notable people ==
- Peder Furubotn (born 1890 in Brekke), a Communist and anti-Nazi resistance leader

== See also ==
- List of former municipalities of Norway
