= Lavik Municipality =

Former municipality in Sogn og Fjordane, Norway

Lavik Municipality Lavik herad
- Former municipality
- Ladvig herred (historic name)
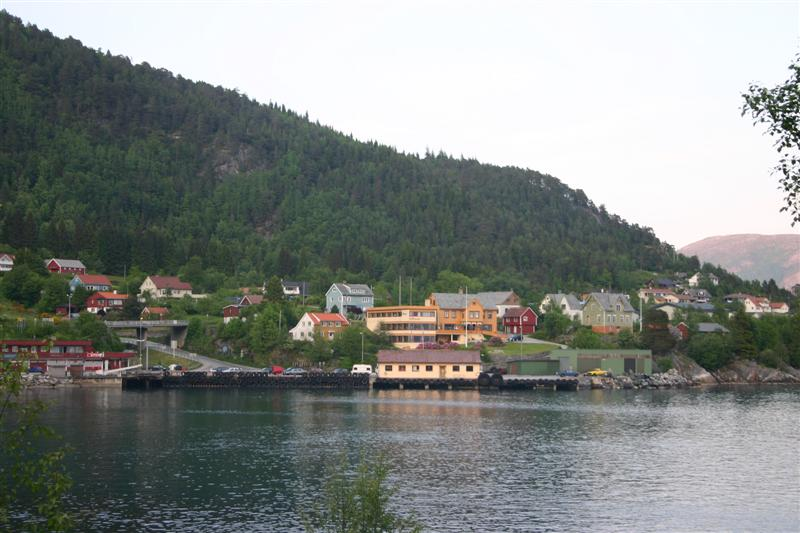
- View of the village of Lavik

- Sogn og Fjordane within Norway

- Lavik within Sogn og Fjordane
- Coordinates: 61°06′17″N 05°30′37″E
- Country: Norway
- County: Sogn og Fjordane
- District: Sogn
- Established: 1 Jan 1838
  - Created as: Formannskapsdistrikt
- Disestablished: 1 Jan 1861
  - Succeeded by: Lavik og Brekke Municipality
- Re-established: 1 Jan 1905
  - Preceded by: Lavik og Brekke Municipality
- Disestablished: 1 Jan 1964
  - Succeeded by: Høyanger Municipality
- Administrative centre: Lavik

Government
  - Mayor (1956–1963): Einar Lavik

Area (upon dissolution)
  - Total: 239.6 km^{2} (92.5 sq mi)
  - Rank: #336 in Norway
- Highest elevation: 884 m (2,900 ft)

Population (1963)
  - Total: 902
  - Rank: #628 in Norway
  - Density: 3.8/km^{2} (9.8/sq mi)
  - Change (10 years): ▼ −5%

Official language
  - Norwegian form: Nynorsk
- Time zone: UTC+01:00 (CET)
  - Summer (DST): UTC+02:00 (CEST)
- ISO 3166 code: NO-1415

Lavik is a former municipality in the old Sogn og Fjordane county, Norway. The 239.6-square-kilometre (92.5 sq mi) municipality existed from 1838 until its dissolution in 1861 and then again from 1905 until its dissolution in 1964. The area is now part of Høyanger Municipality in the traditional district of Sogn in Vestland county. The administrative centre was the village of Lavik.

Prior to its dissolution in 1964, the 239.6-square-kilometre (92.5 sq mi) municipality was the 336th largest by area out of the 689 municipalities in Norway. Lavik Municipality was the 628th most populous municipality in Norway with a population of about 902. The municipality's population density was 3.8 inhabitants per square kilometre (9.8/sq mi) and its population had decreased by 5% over the previous 10-year period.

== General information ==
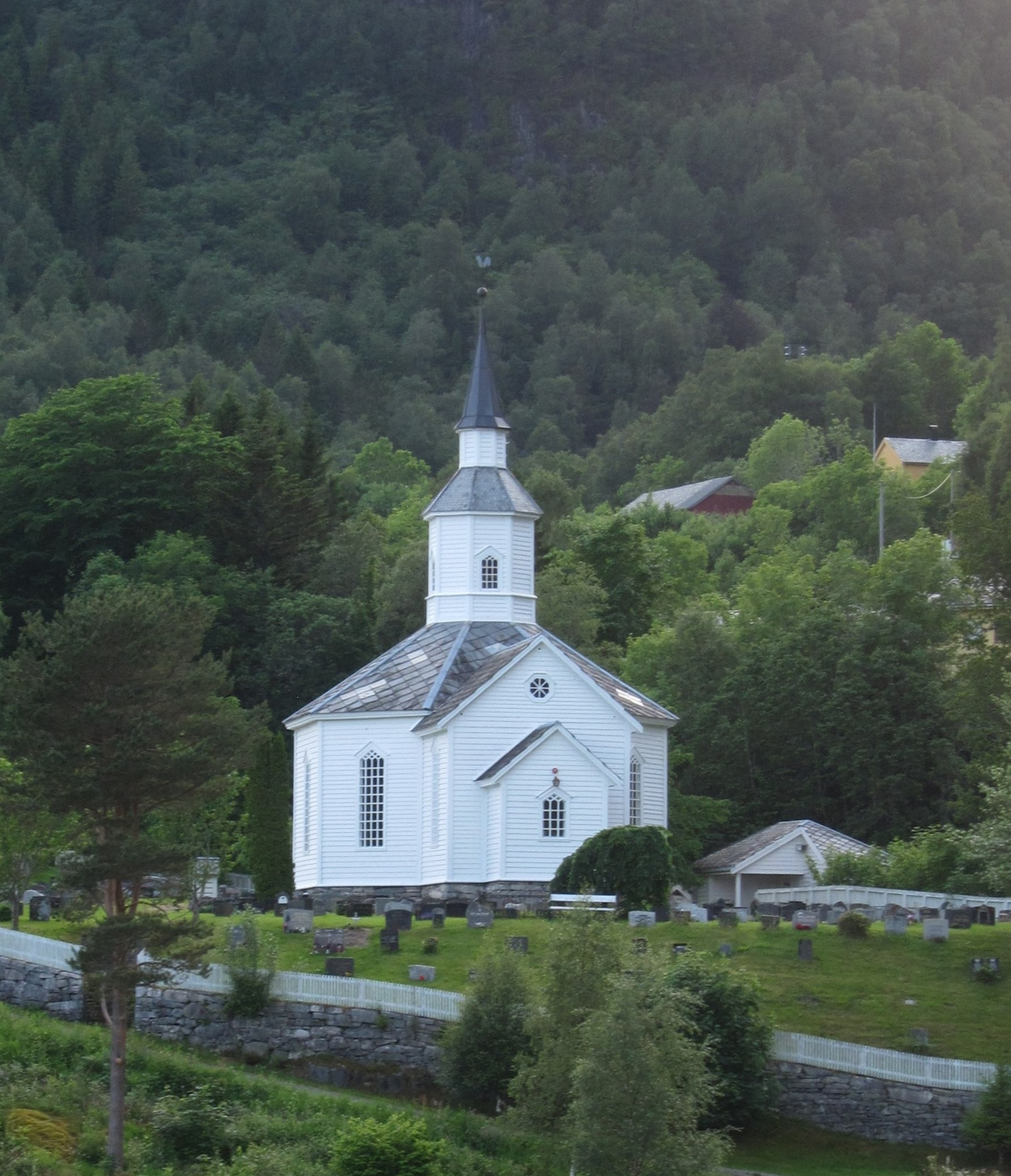
Lavik Church as seen from the ferry

=== Establishment ===
The parish of Ladevig (later spelled Lavik) was established as a municipality on 1 January 1838 (see formannskapsdistrikt law). In 1858, the municipality was divided. The eastern part became Klævold Municipality (population: 1,645) and the western part remained as a much smaller Lavik Municipality (population: 2,042).

In 1861, Lavik Municipality (population: 926) was merged with the neighboring Brekke Municipality (population: 898), located on the south side of the Sognefjord, to form the new Lavik og Brekke Municipality.

On 1 January 1875, a part of Klævold Municipality (population: 90) was transferred to Lavik og Brekke Municipality. On 1 January 1905, Lavik og Brekke Municipality (population: 2,164) was divided, reverting to the pre-1861 borders (except for the small change in 1875) and re-creating Lavik Municipality (population: 1,182) and Brekke Municipality (population: 982) as separate municipalities once again.

During the 1960s, there were many municipal mergers across Norway due to the work of the Schei Committee. On 1 January 1964, the following areas were merged to form the new Høyanger Municipality:

- all of Lavik Municipality (population: 894)
- all of Kyrkjebø Municipality (population: 4,742)
- the unpopulated Nybø and Nygjerdet areas of Vik Municipality

=== Name ===
The municipality (originally the parish) is named after the old Lavik farm (Old Norse: Lámvíkum) since the first Lavik Church was built there. The first element has an uncertain meaning. One possibility is that it comes from the word hlað which means "pile" or "stack". The last element likely comes from the word vík which means "inlet" or "cove". Historically the spelling has varied greatly. It was Laduigh in the 16th century, Laduig in the 17th century, Ladvig in the 18th century, Ladevig in the 19th century, and finally Lavik in the 20th century.

=== Churches ===
The Church of Norway had one parish (sokn) within Lavik Municipality. At the time of the municipal dissolution, it was part of the Lavik prestegjeld and the Ytre Sogn prosti (deanery) in the Diocese of Bjørgvin.

Churches in Lavik Municipality
Parish (sokn)	Church name	Location of the church	Year built
Lavik	Lavik Church	Lavik	1865

== Geography ==
The municipality was located in the outer Sogn region, on both the north and south side of the Sognefjorden. The municipality was mostly on the northern side of the Sognefjorden. A smaller part of Lavik was located on the southern side of the Sognefjorden, a strip of land running south around the Ikjefjorden, past the village of Øystrebø, all the way south to the border with Hordaland county. The highest point in the municipality was the 887-metre (2,910 ft) tall mountain Blyfjellet, located on the southeastern border with Kyrkjebø Municipality.

Fjaler Municipality was located to the north, Kyrkjebø Municipality was located to the east, Masfjorden Municipality (in Hordaland county) was located to the south, Brekke Municipality was located to the southwest, and Hyllestad Municipality was located to the northwest.

== Government ==
While it existed, Lavik Municipality was responsible for primary education (through 10th grade), outpatient health services, senior citizen services, welfare and other social services, zoning, economic development, and municipal roads and utilities. The municipality was governed by a municipal council of directly elected representatives. The mayor was indirectly elected by a vote of the municipal council. The municipality was under the jurisdiction of the Gulating Court of Appeal.

=== Municipal council ===
The municipal council (Heradsstyre) of Lavik Municipality was made up of 17 representatives that were elected to four year terms. The tables below show the historical composition of the council by political party.

Lavik heradsstyre 1959–1963
Party name (in Nynorsk)	Number of representatives
Labour Party (Arbeidarpartiet)	6
Liberal Party (Venstre)	1
Joint List(s) of Non-Socialist Parties (Borgarlege Felleslister)	8
Local List(s) (Lokale lister)	2
Total number of members:	17

Lavik heradsstyre 1955–1959
Party name (in Nynorsk)	Number of representatives
Labour Party (Arbeidarpartiet)	5
Christian Democratic Party (Kristeleg Folkeparti)	1
Farmers' Party (Bondepartiet)	3
Liberal Party (Venstre)	3
Local List(s) (Lokale lister)	5
Total number of members:	17

Lavik heradsstyre 1951–1955
Party name (in Nynorsk)	Number of representatives
Labour Party (Arbeidarpartiet)	4
Liberal Party (Venstre)	4
Local List(s) (Lokale lister)	8
Total number of members:	16

Lavik heradsstyre 1947–1951
Party name (in Nynorsk)	Number of representatives
Labour Party (Arbeidarpartiet)	5
Liberal Party (Venstre)	4
Local List(s) (Lokale lister)	7
Total number of members:	16

Lavik heradsstyre 1945–1947
Party name (in Nynorsk)	Number of representatives
Liberal Party (Venstre)	4
List of workers, fishermen, and small farmholders (Arbeidarar, fiskarar, småbrukarar liste)	5
Local List(s) (Lokale lister)	7
Total number of members:	16

Lavik heradsstyre 1937–1941*
Party name (in Nynorsk)	Number of representatives
Labour Party (Arbeidarpartiet)	4
Local List(s) (Lokale lister)	12
Total number of members:	16
Note: Due to the German occupation of Norway during World War II, no elections were held for new municipal councils until after the war ended in 1945.

=== Mayors ===
The mayor (Nynorsk: ordførar) of Lavik Municipality was the political leader of the municipality and the chairperson of the municipal council. The following people held this position:

- 1838–1851: Jacob Gabriel Lund
- 1852–1853: Hans H. Hellebø
- 1854–1857: I. Løland
- 1858–1860: Peder Fredrik Hartwig
- (1861–1904: Lavik Municipality was part of Lavik og Brekke Municipality)
- 1905–1914: Lasse Trædal
- 1920–1925: Mons A. Ringereide
- 1926–1936: Johannes Instefjord
- 1936–1937: Edvard Hellem
- 1938–1940: Einar Raasholm
- 1941–1942: Hans K. Torvund
- 1943–1945: Kåre Nyheim
- 1945–1945: Einar Raasholm
- 1945–1947: Gjert Raae
- 1948–1955: Thomas Kvammen
- 1956–1963: Einar Lavik

== See also ==
- List of former municipalities of Norway
