= Lavik (village) =

Village in Høyanger Municipality, Norway

- Village
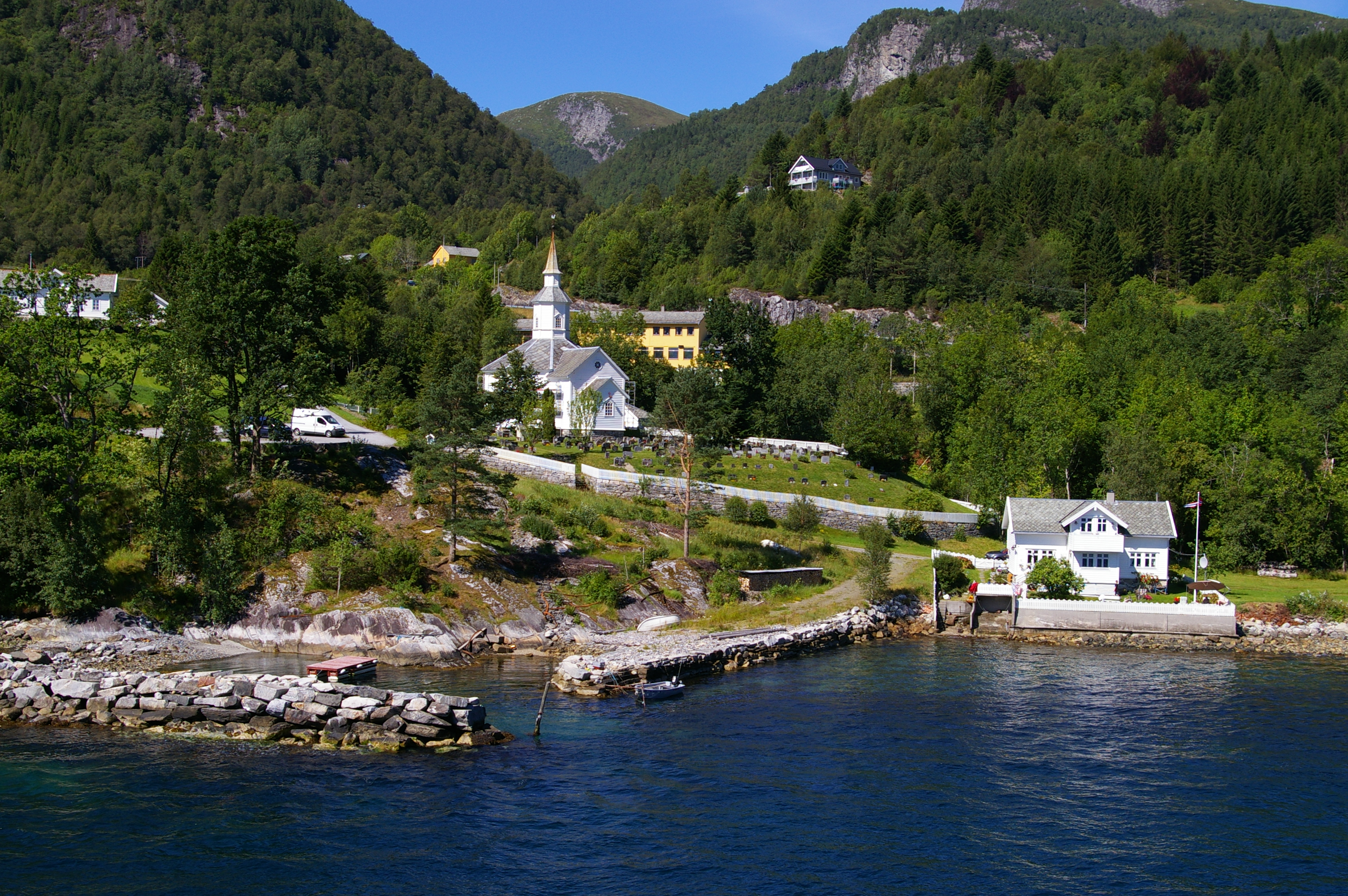
- View of the village with Lavik Church
- Interactive map of Lavik
- Location within Vestland Location within Norway
- Coordinates: 61.10356°N 5.51331°E
- Country: Norway
- Region: Western Norway
- County: Vestland
- District: Sogn
- Municipality: Høyanger Municipality
- Elevation: 16 m (52 ft)
- Time zone: UTC+01:00 (CET)
  - Summer (DST): UTC+02:00 (CEST)
- Post Code: 6947 Lavik

Lavik is a village in Høyanger Municipality in Vestland county, Norway. The village is located on the northern shore of Sognefjorden, approximately 100 kilometres (62 mi) north of the city of Bergen and about 50 kilometres (31 mi) west of the municipal center of Høyanger. Lavik is situated about 40 kilometres (25 mi) west of the villages of Kyrkjebø and Austreim, and about 25 kilometres (16 mi) southwest of the village of Vadheim. In 2001, the Lavik area had a population of about 1,000 people, with about 285 living in the village of Lavik and the rest in the surrounding countryside.

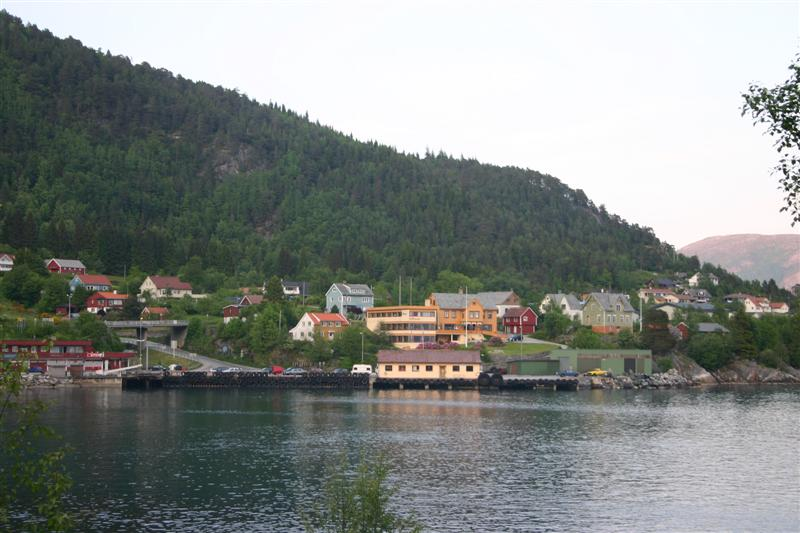
Lavik as seen from the ferry

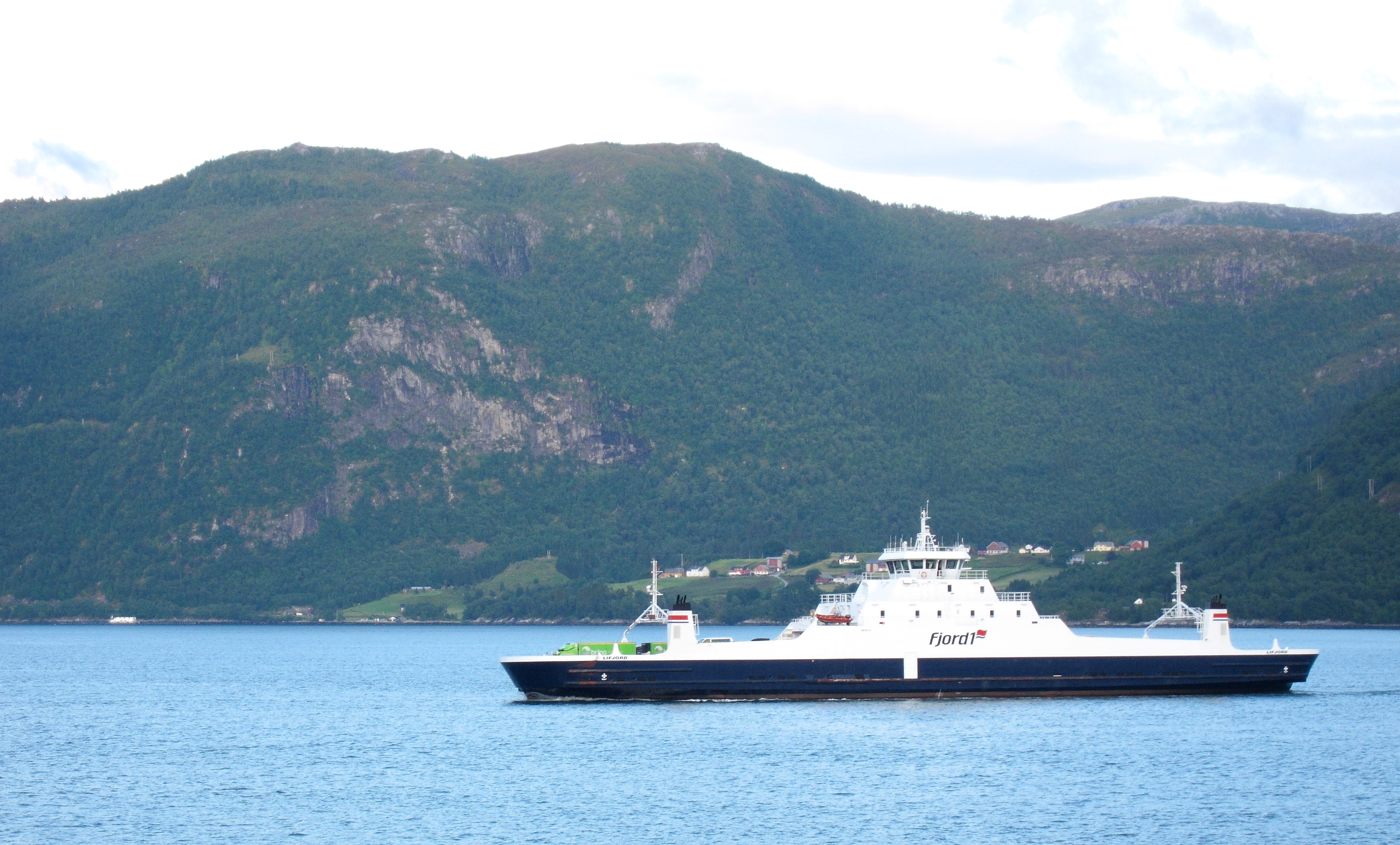
View of the ferry to Lavik

The village of Lavik has historically been a farming community but it has more recently been developing into a transportation hub along the European route E39 highway, the main highway from Bergen to Trondheim. Lavik is the northern point of the Lavik—Oppedal ferry served by Fjord1 Nordvestlandske that crosses Sognefjorden as part of the E39 highway. This route is served by the MV Ampere, the world's first battery electric car ferry. There are several services in the small harbour area: a snack bar, a pizzeria, a hotel, and a restaurant on Sognefjorden. There is also a supermarket, a bank, a service station, and several other shops in Lavik.

== History ==
The village has been the site of the Lavik Church for centuries. The village was the administrative centre of the old Lavik Municipality from 1838 until 1861. In 1861, Lavik Municipality was merged with Brekke Municipality to form the new Lavik og Brekke Municipality. From 1861 until 1905, the village of Lavik was the administrative centre of that municipality as well. In 1905, Lavik og Brekke Municipality was divided into Lavik Municipality and Brekke Municipality once again. The village then continued to be the administrative centre of Lavik Municipality until 1964 when it was merged into the new Høyanger Municipality which had its administrative centre at the village of Høyanger.

=== Name ===
The village area is named after the old Ladvik farm (Old Norse: Lamvíkum), since Lavik Church is located there. The first element comes from the Old Norse word hlað which means "pile" or "load". The second element possibly comes from the Old Norse word víkr which means "inlet". Historically the spelling has varied greatly. It was Laduigh in the 16th century, Laduig in the 17th century, Ladvig in the 18th century, Ladevig in the 19th century, and finally Lavik in the 20th century.
