= Instefjord =

Village in Gulen Municipality, Norway

Instefjord Fjorden
- Village
- Interactive map of Instefjord
- Location within Vestland Location within Norway
- Coordinates: 60.98647°N 5.48233°E
- Country: Norway
- Region: Western Norway
- County: Vestland
- District: Sogn
- Municipality: Gulen Municipality
- Elevation: 3 m (9.8 ft)
- Time zone: UTC+01:00 (CET)
  - Summer (DST): UTC+02:00 (CEST)
- Post Code: 5961 Brekke

Instefjord is a small village in Gulen Municipality in Vestland county, Norway. It is located at the southern end of the Risnefjorden, a small arm that branches off the main Sognefjorden. The European route E39 highway runs through the village on its way from the city of Bergen to the city of Førde. The small village of Brekke lies about 4 kilometres (2.5 mi) to the northwest, and the small village of Oppedal lies about 9 kilometres (5.6 mi) to the northeast. Fish farming and agriculture are the main industries in Instefjord.
