= Lasse Trædal =

Norwegian farmer, schoolteacher and politician

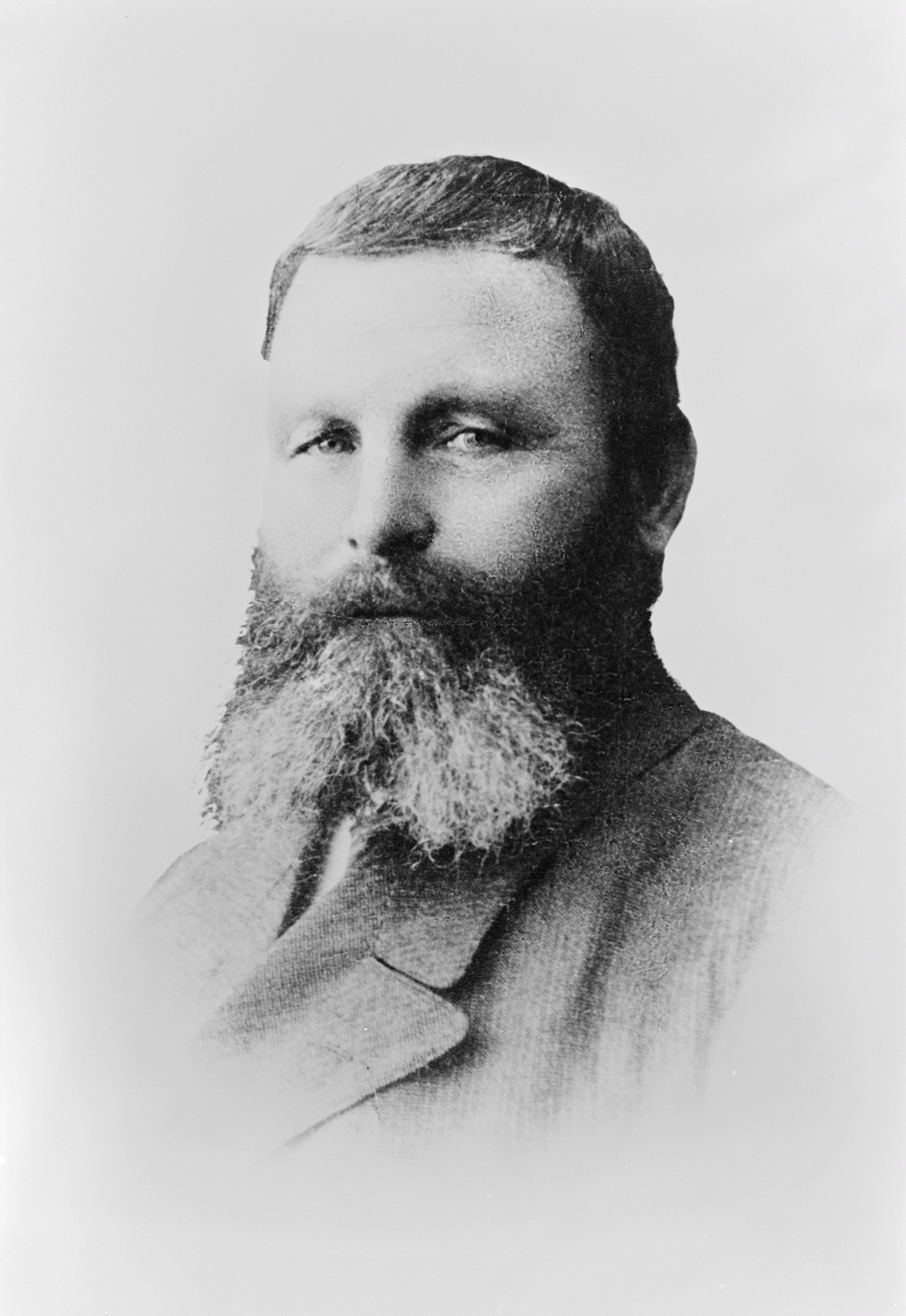
- Born: December 20, 1924; Lavik Municipality, Norway
- Died: October 14, 1924 (aged 66)
- Occupations: Farmer, teacher and politician
- Political party: Liberal Party

Lasse Torkelson Trædal (20 December 1857 – 14 October 1924) was a Norwegian farmer, schoolteacher and politician for the Liberal Party.

He was born in Lavik Municipality and was a member of the municipal council of Lavik og Brekke Municipality from 1895 to 1904 and on the municipal council of Lavik Municipality from 1905 to 1913. He also served as mayor of Lavik Municipality from 1905-1913 He was elected to the Parliament of Norway from Nordre Bergenhus Amt in 1900, and after a hiatus he won re-elections in 1909, 1912 and 1915.
