= Brekke (village) =

Village in Gulen Municipality, Norway

- Village
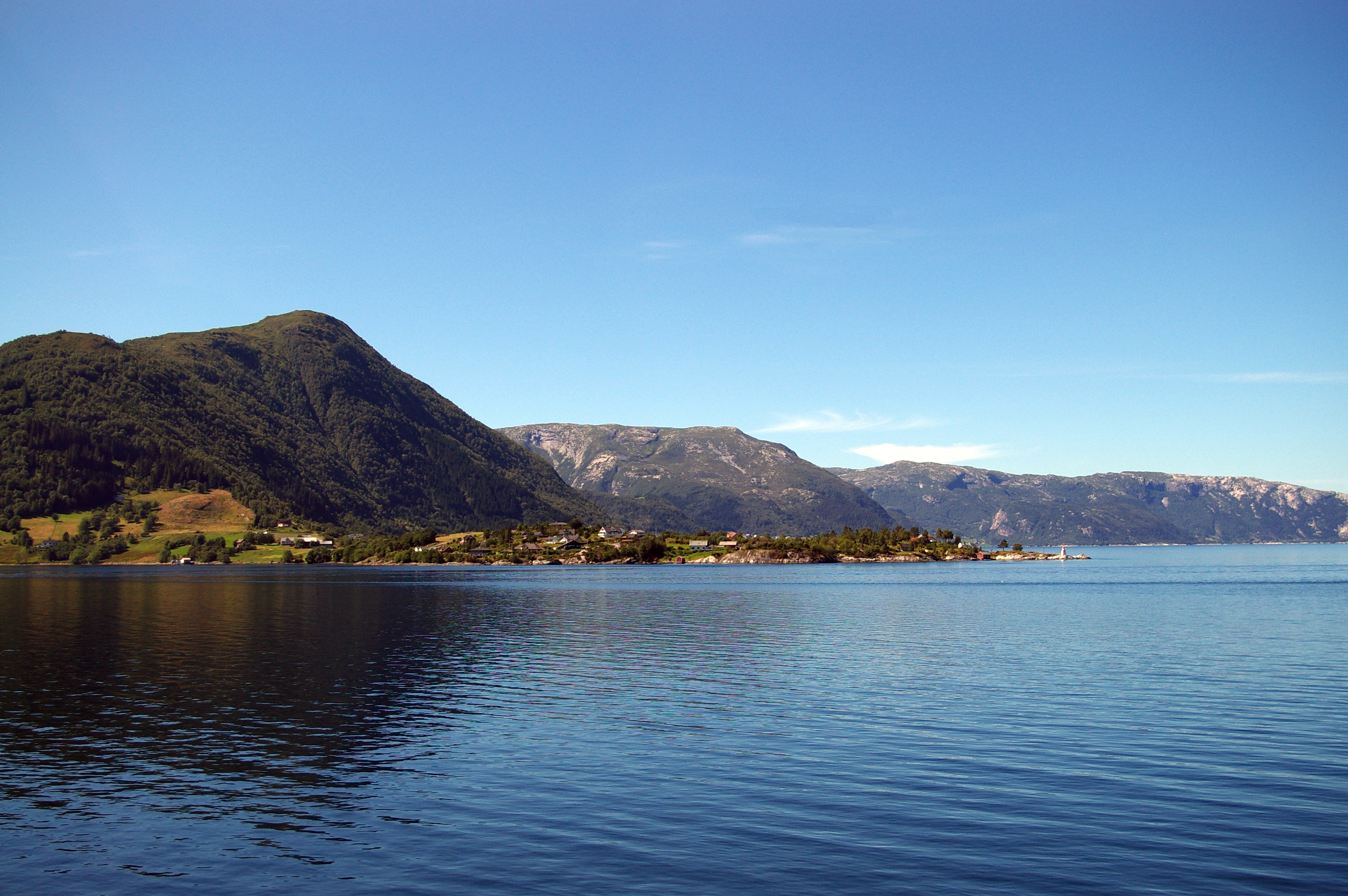
- View of the village area
- Interactive map of Brekke
- Location within Vestland Location within Norway
- Coordinates: 61.02001°N 5.46153°E
- Country: Norway
- Region: Western Norway
- County: Vestland
- District: Sogn
- Municipality: Gulen Municipality
- Elevation: 3 m (9.8 ft)
- Time zone: UTC+01:00 (CET)
  - Summer (DST): UTC+02:00 (CEST)
- Post Code: 5961 Brekke

Brekke is a village in the northeastern part of Gulen Municipality in Vestland county, Norway. The village of Brekke has a population (2001) of 299 people. The village is located in the eastern part of the municipality on the southern shore of the Sognefjorden and the small Risnesfjorden inlet that branches off the main fjord. Brekke sits about a 35 kilometres (22 mi) drive from the village of Eivindvik, the municipal center of Gulen Municipality.

The European route E39 highway is accessible 4.5 kilometres (2.8 mi) south of the village at the village of Instefjord. There is ferry service across the Sognefjorden available 12 kilometres (7.5 mi) away at the village of Oppedal.

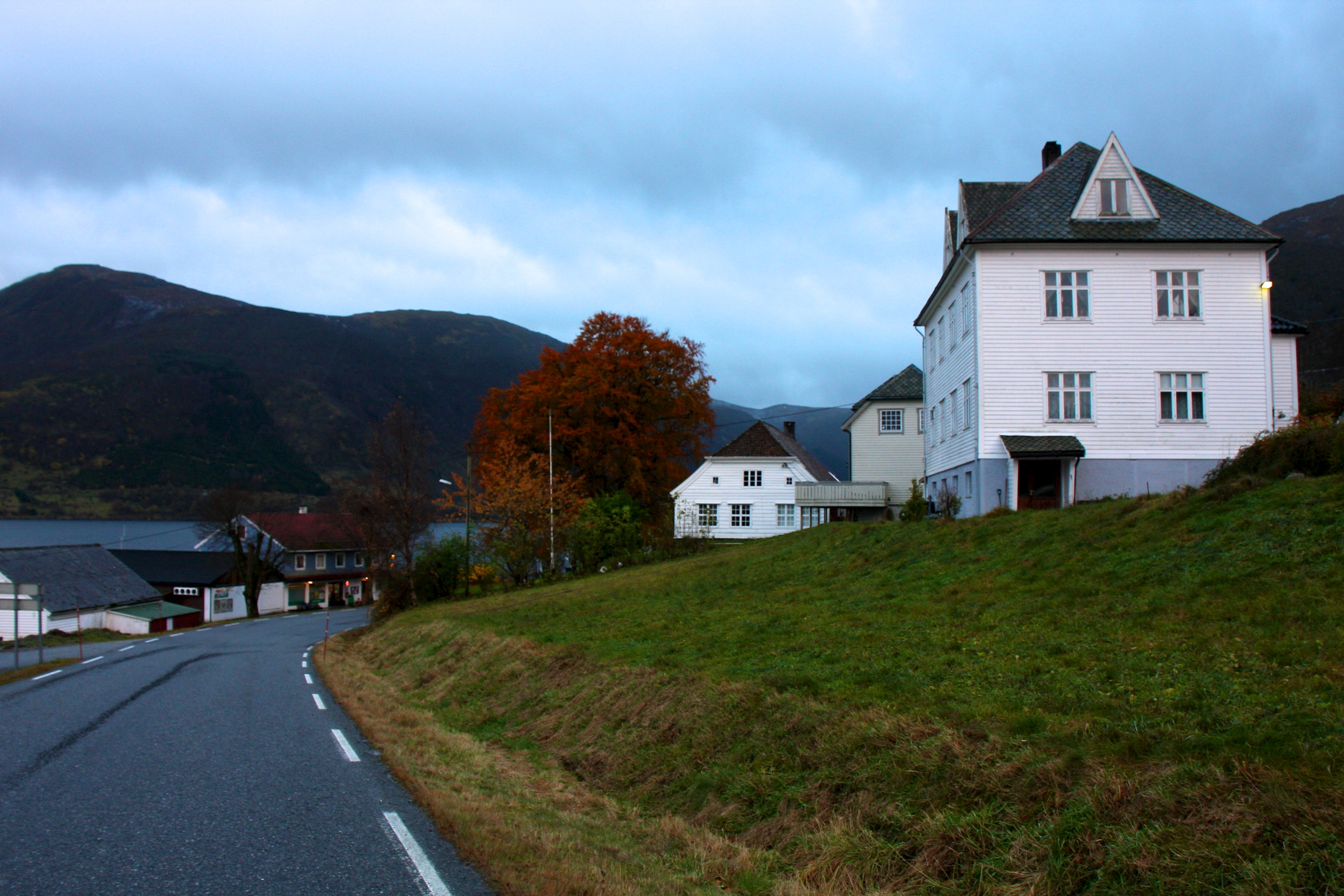
View of Brekke

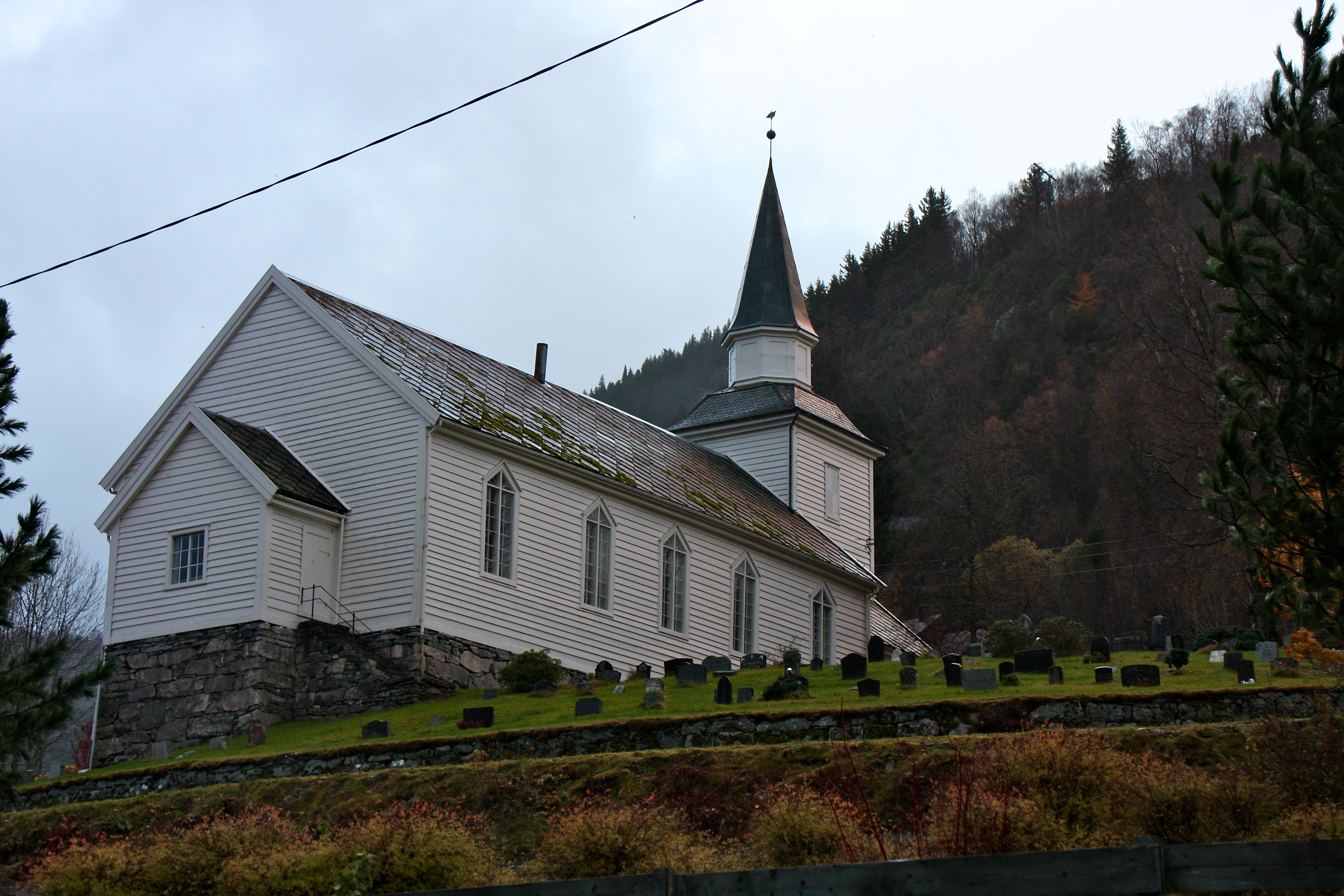
View of the local church

== History ==
The old Brekke Municipality existed from 1850 until 1861 and then again from 1905 until 1964. The administrative center of the municipality was the village of Brekke. The school, post office, Brekke Church, and municipal administration were all located in this village.

=== Name ===
The municipality is named after the old Brekke farm (Old Norse: Brekka) since Brekke Church was located there. The name is identical to the old Norwegian word meaning "slope", probably since the village is built on the slopes leading down to the fjord.

== Climate ==
Brekke and its surroundings are notable as one of the wettest parts of Norway. The nearby weather station in Verkland, about 7 kilometres (4.3 mi) to the south, recorded a record amount of rainfall in one calendar year. In 1990, there were 5,546 millimetres (218.3 in) of rain that fell. In the summer of 1964, the station received 1,284 millimetres (50.6 in) of rain, making that the wettest summer on record. However, the village of Brekke gets slightly less rain than measured at Verkland.

Climate data for Verkland i Gulen 1991-2020 (242 m)
Month	Jan	Feb	Mar	Apr	May	Jun	Jul	Aug	Sep	Oct	Nov	Dec	Year
Average precipitation mm (inches)	383.1 (15.08)	310.3 (12.22)	285.5 (11.24)	198.5 (7.81)	168.4 (6.63)	176.9 (6.96)	202.3 (7.96)	256.1 (10.08)	344.3 (13.56)	374.5 (14.74)	382.6 (15.06)	412.1 (16.22)	3,494.6 (137.56)
Average precipitation days	22	19	20	16	16	15	17	18	18	18	20	22	221
Source 1: Noaa WMO averages 91-2020 Norway
Source 2: seklima

Climate data for Verkland i Gulen 1961–1990 (242 m)
Month	Jan	Feb	Mar	Apr	May	Jun	Jul	Aug	Sep	Oct	Nov	Dec	Year
Daily mean °C (°F)	−1.0 (30.2)	−1.0 (30.2)	1.0 (33.8)	3.0 (37.4)	8.0 (46.4)	11.0 (51.8)	12.2 (54.0)	12.0 (53.6)	9.0 (48.2)	6.5 (43.7)	2.0 (35.6)	0.0 (32.0)	5.2 (41.4)
Average precipitation mm (inches)	347 (13.7)	255 (10.0)	283 (11.1)	162 (6.4)	149 (5.9)	193 (7.6)	217 (8.5)	270 (10.6)	454 (17.9)	447 (17.6)	402 (15.8)	396 (15.6)	3,575 (140.7)
Average precipitation days	19.0	15.1	17.6	13.7	13.6	14.6	16.4	16.8	20.7	20.6	20.2	20.5	208.8
Source: e-Klima
