= MV Ampere =

Electric-powered RORO ferry

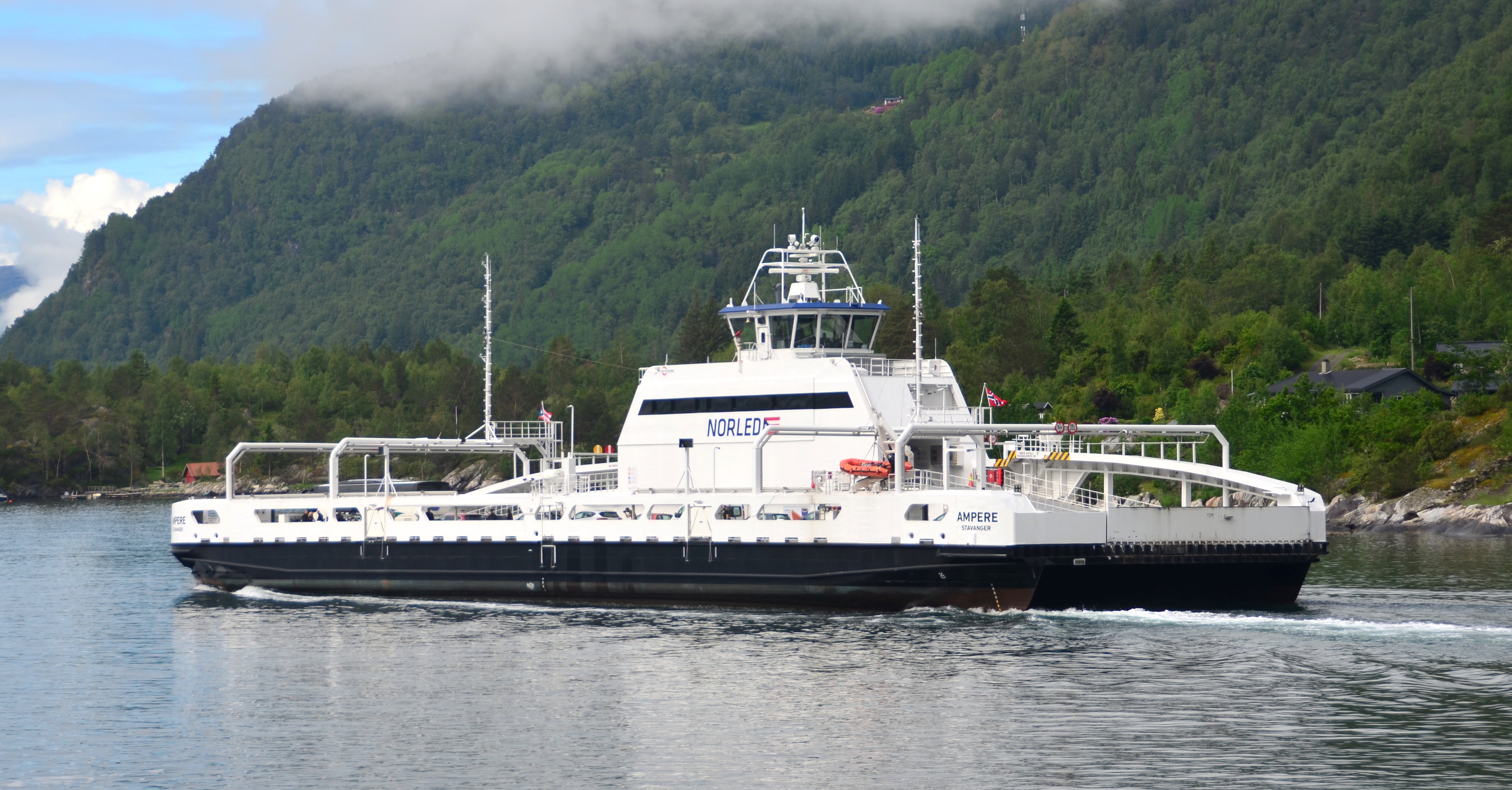
- In Sognefjord, May 2019

History

Norway
- Name: MV Ampere (formerly ZeroCat)
- Operator: Norled
- Port of registry: Stavanger, Norway
- Route: Lavik - Oppedal
- Builder: Fjellstrand in Omastrand Hull build in Polish yard Aluship Technology
- Yard number: 1696
- Maiden voyage: May 2015
- Identification: IMO number: 96836111; MMSI number: 2576420001; Callsign: LFEA
- Status: in service

General characteristics
- Class & type: Electric Roll-on/roll-off Passenger ferry
- Tonnage: Gross tonnage: 1598
- Length: 260 ft (79 m)
- Beam: 21 m (68 ft 11 in)
- Installed power: 800 kW (1,073 bhp) battery
- Propulsion: Azipull thrusters with controllable pitch propellers
- Speed: 10 knots (12 mph; 19 km/h)
- Capacity: 360 passengers, 120 cars

MV Ampere is the world's first battery-electric car ferry, operating between the villages of Lavik (in Høyanger Municipality) and Oppedal (in Gulen Municipality) in Vestland county, Norway. It is owned and operated by Norled, and crosses the Sognefjord, the longest and deepest fjord in Norway.

== History ==
MV Ampere is the world's first battery-electric car ferry, developed and built in Norway. Its development was the result of a competition, launched by the country's Ministry of Transport and Communications in 2011, to develop an environmentally friendly ferry service between the two villages.

It is reported that the ferry's battery-electric propulsion system avoids the use of 1,000,000 litres (220,000 imp gal; 260,000 US gal) of diesel annually and offsets 570 tonnes (560 long tons; 630 short tons) of carbon dioxide and 15 tonnes (15 long tons; 17 short tons) of nitrogen oxide emissions compared to a conventional ferry on the same route.

== Layout ==
MV Ampere has 260-foot (79 m) twin hulls constructed from aluminum to minimise weight. She is propelled by Rolls-Royce Azipull thrusters, powered by two 450-kilowatt (600 hp) electric motors with batteries. The 10 tonnes (9.8 long tons; 11 short tons) lithium-ion batteries were developed by Corvus Energy and integrated by Siemens with an overall output of 1,000 kilowatt-hours (3,600 MJ). They can be recharged in 10 minutes between crossings from high-capacity batteries at each port.

Other energy saving features are LED lighting, solar panels, and air conditioning with a waste heat recovery system.

== Service ==
MV Ampere operates the 5.7-kilometre (3.5 mi) long, 20-minute crossing between Lavik and Oppedal.
