= Lavik Church =

Church in Vestland, Norway

- Lavik kyrkje
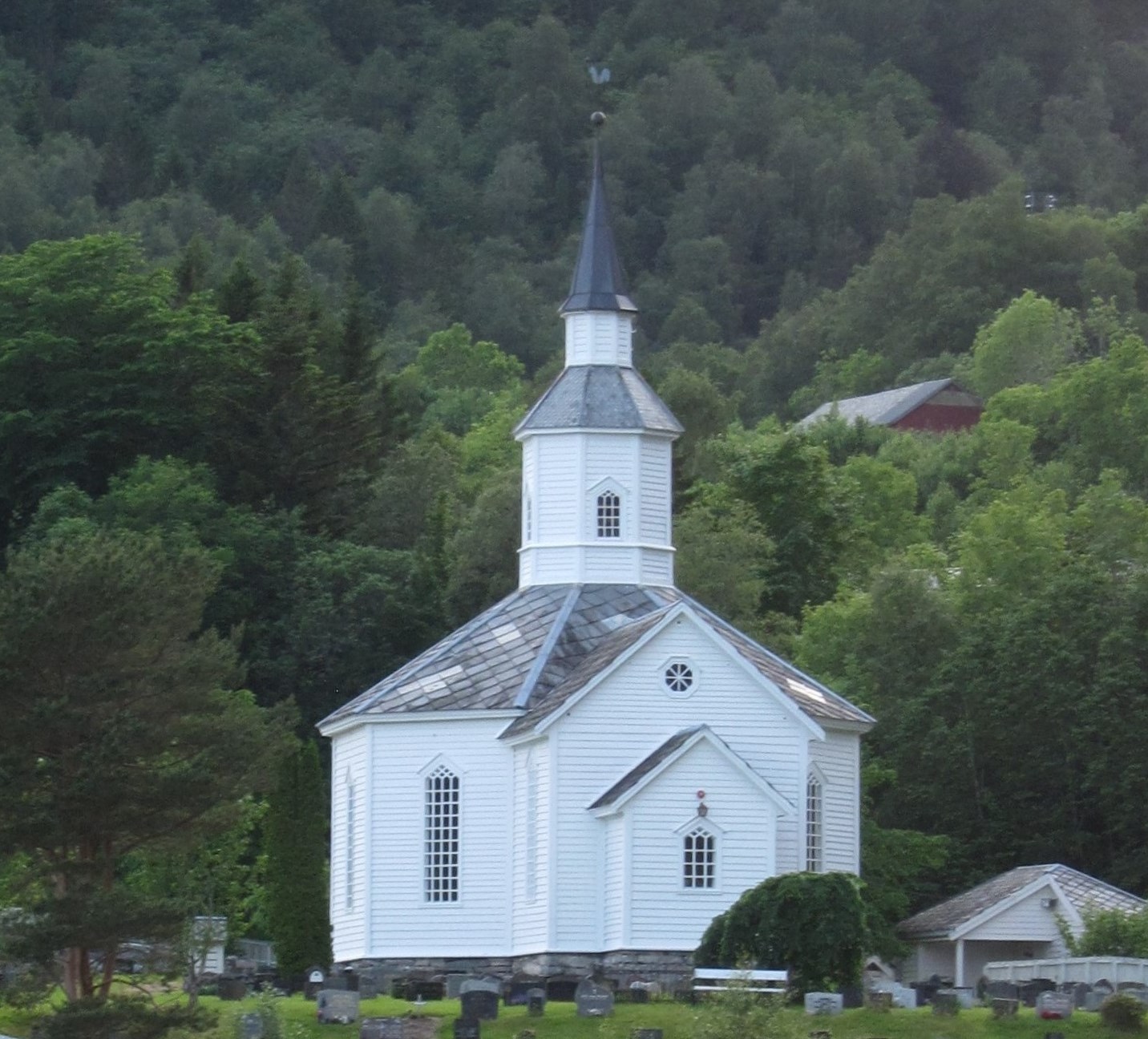
- View of the church
- Lavik Church
- 61°06′16″N 5°30′06″E
- Location: Høyanger Municipality, Vestland
- Country: Norway
- Denomination: Church of Norway
- Churchmanship: Evangelical Lutheran

History
- Status: Parish church
- Founded: 12th century
- Consecrated: 10 Dec 1865

Architecture
- Functional status: Active
- Architect: Christian Heinrich Grosch
- Architectural type: Octagonal
- Completed: 1865 (161 years ago)

Specifications
- Capacity: 380
- Materials: Wood

Administration
- Diocese: Bjørgvin bispedømme
- Deanery: Sunnfjord prosti
- Parish: Lavik
- Norwegian Cultural Heritage Site
- Type: Church
- Status: Listed
- ID: 84917

Lavik Church (Norwegian: Lavik kyrkje) is a parish church of the Church of Norway in Høyanger Municipality in Vestland county, Norway. It is located in the village of Lavik on the northern shore of the Sognefjorden. It is the church for the Lavik parish which is part of the Sunnfjord prosti (deanery) in the Diocese of Bjørgvin. The white, wooden church was built in an octagonal design in 1865 using plans drawn up by the architect Christian Heinrich Grosch. The church seats about 380 people.

== History ==
The earliest existing historical records of the church date back to the year 1327, but it was not new that year. The first church was likely a wooden stave church that was built in the 12th century. Not much is known of the first church, but it was located about 30 metres (98 ft) east of the present church building. In 1594, the old church was torn down and its materials were sold. A new, small, timber-framed long church was built on the same site as the previous church. The church had a nave that measured about 9.4 by 7.5 metres (31 ft × 25 ft) and a choir that measured about 5.5 by 7.5 metres (18 ft × 25 ft). There was also a small church porch on the west end of the building. Prior to 1809, Lavik church was an annex church in the Evindvig parish, but since 1809 it has been its own parish.

In 1814, this church served as an election church (Norwegian: valgkirke). Together with more than 300 other parish churches across Norway, it was a polling station for elections to the 1814 Norwegian Constituent Assembly which wrote the Constitution of Norway. These were Norway's first national elections. Each church parish was a constituency that elected people called "electors" who later met together in each county to elect the representatives for the assembly that was to meet at Eidsvoll Manor later that year.

In 1864, a new church was built about 30 metres (98 ft) to the west of the old church. The new Swiss chalet style building was constructed because the old church from 1594 was deemed to be too small for the parish. The new church was designed by Christian Heinrich Grosch and the lead builder was Johannes Øvsthus. The new building had an octagonal floorplan with a 13-by-12.7-metre (43 ft × 42 ft) nave and a rectangular 6-by-5-metre (20 ft × 16 ft) choir extension to the east. There is also a small, rectangular church porch extension to the west of the nave. It was consecrated on 10 December 1865 by the local Dean Thomas Erichsen. After the new church was completed, the old church was torn down.

== Media gallery ==
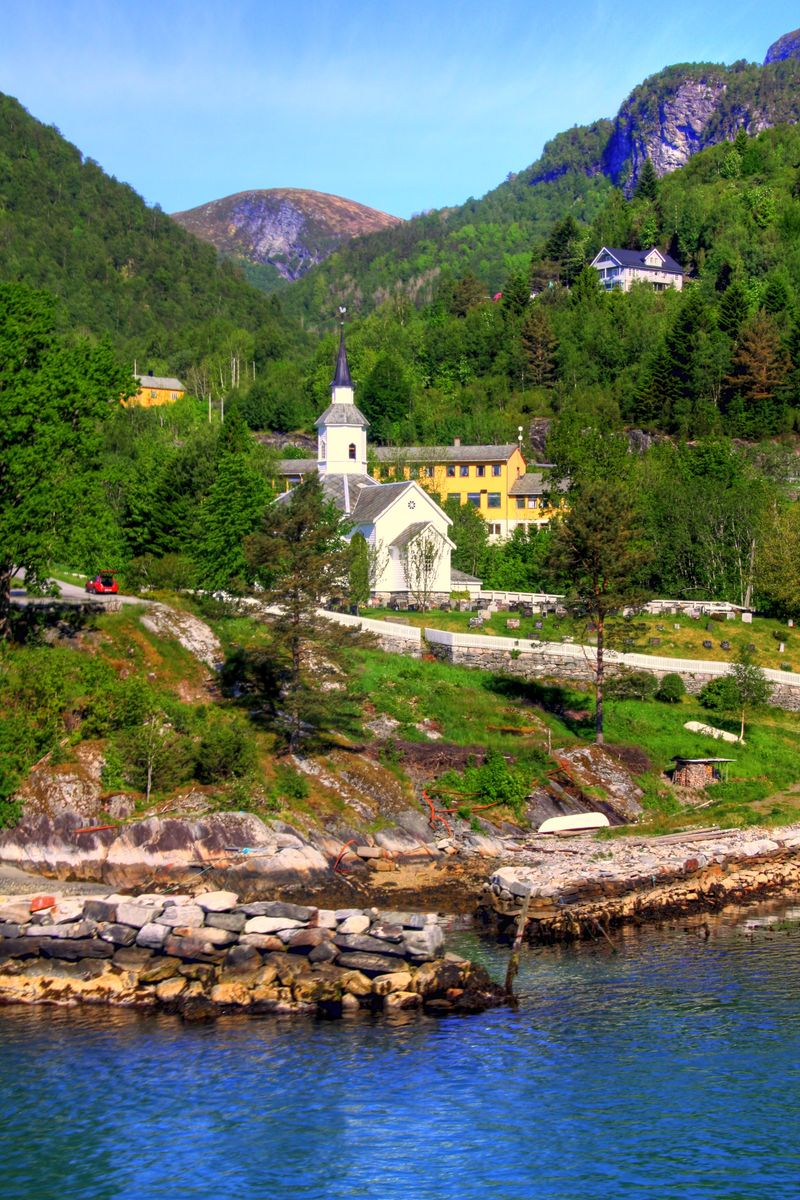

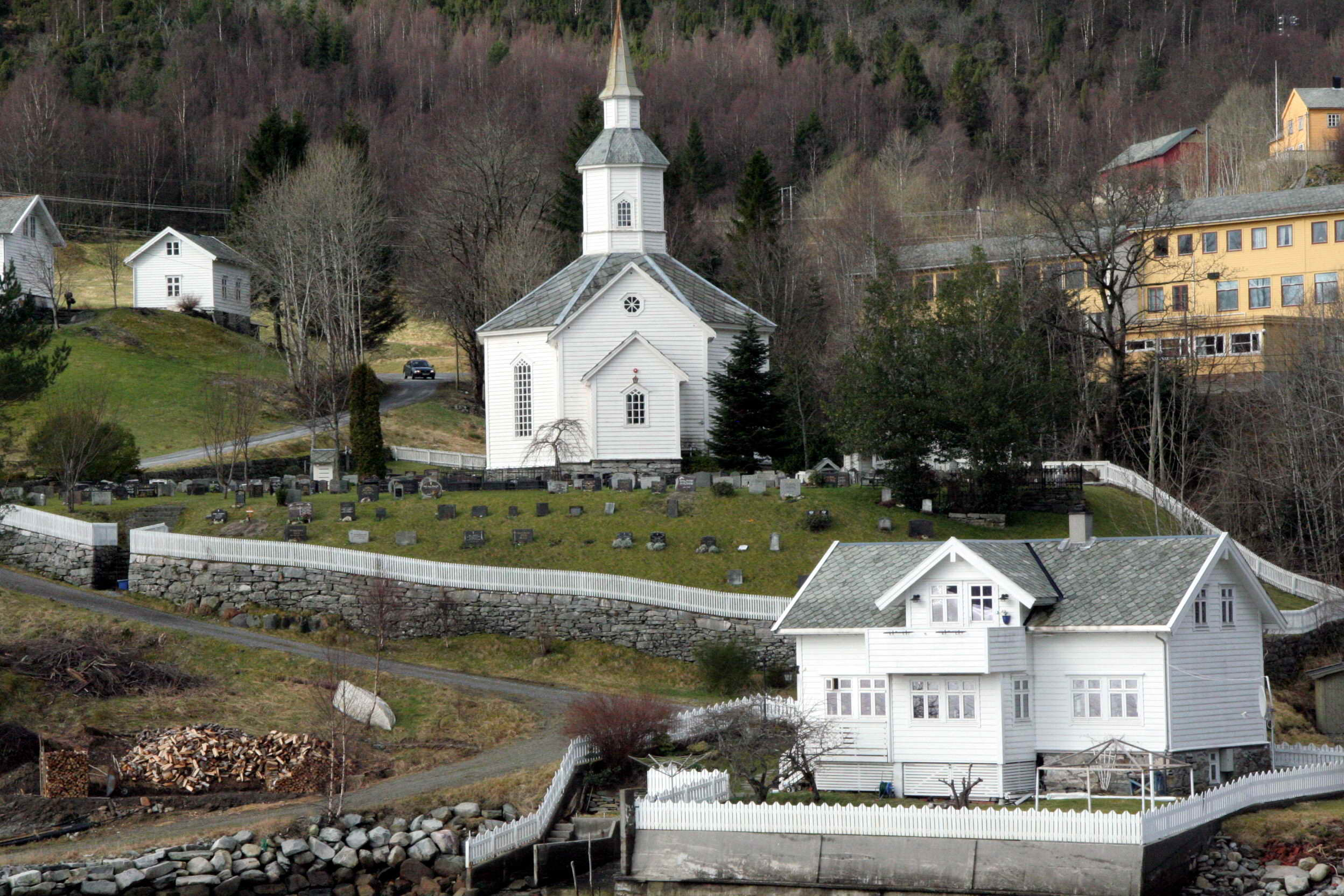

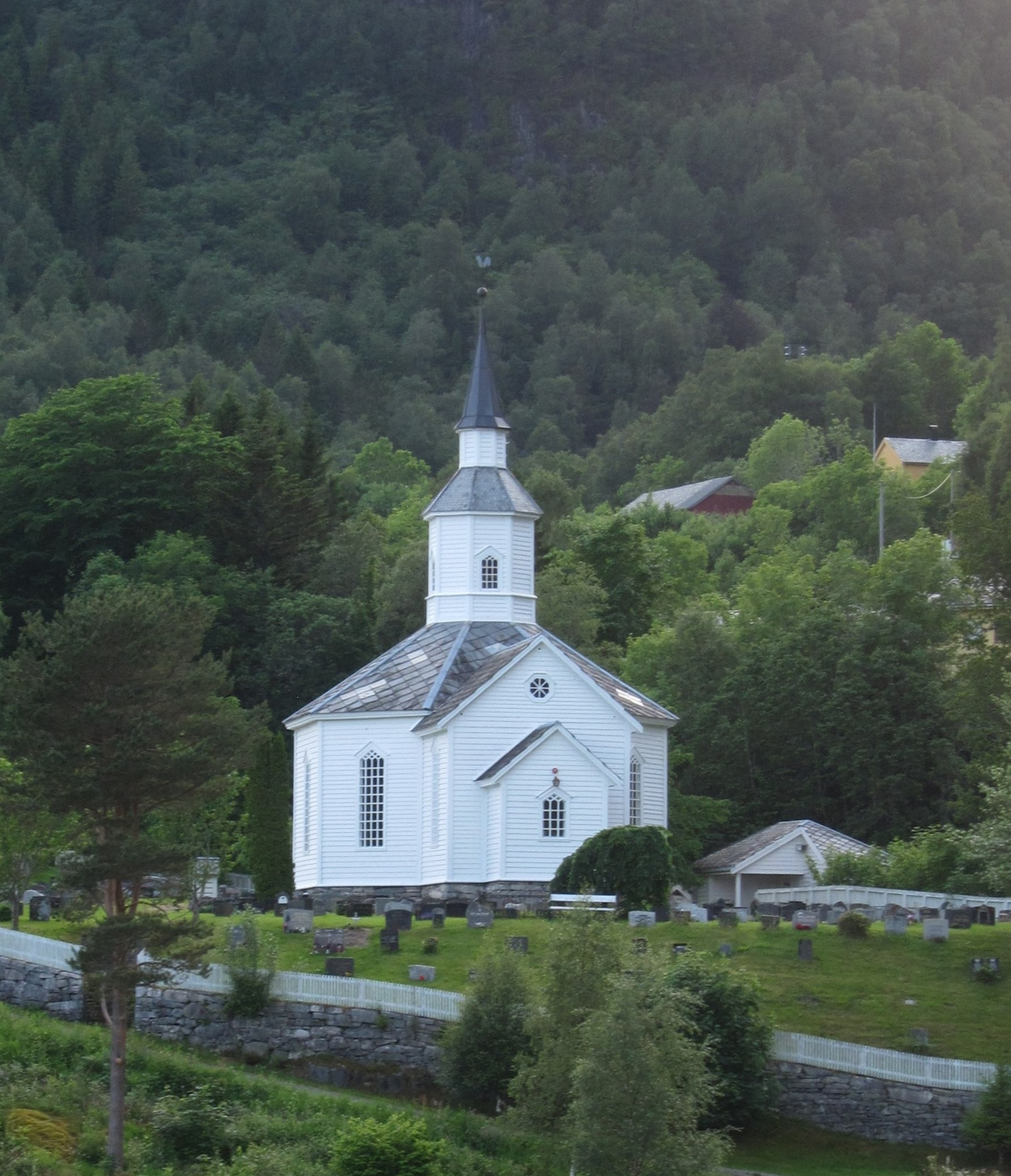

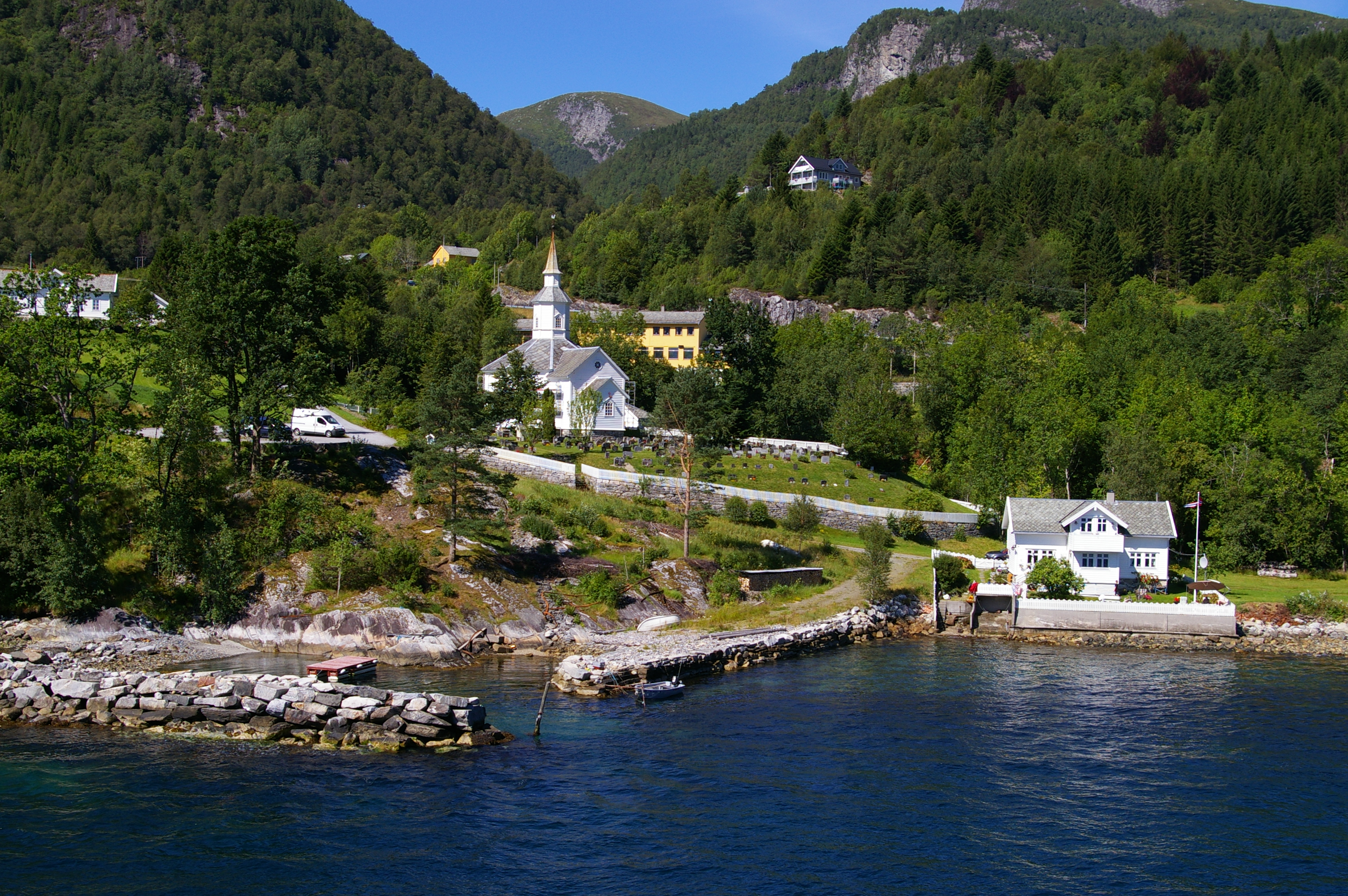

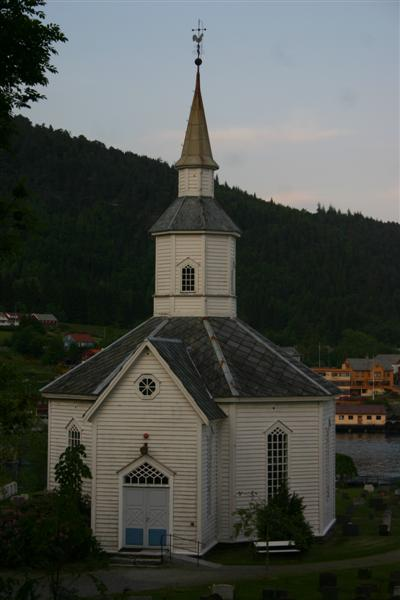

== See also ==
- List of churches in Bjørgvin
