= Ytre Oppedal =

Village in Gulen Municipality, Norway

Oppedal Ytre Oppedal
- Village
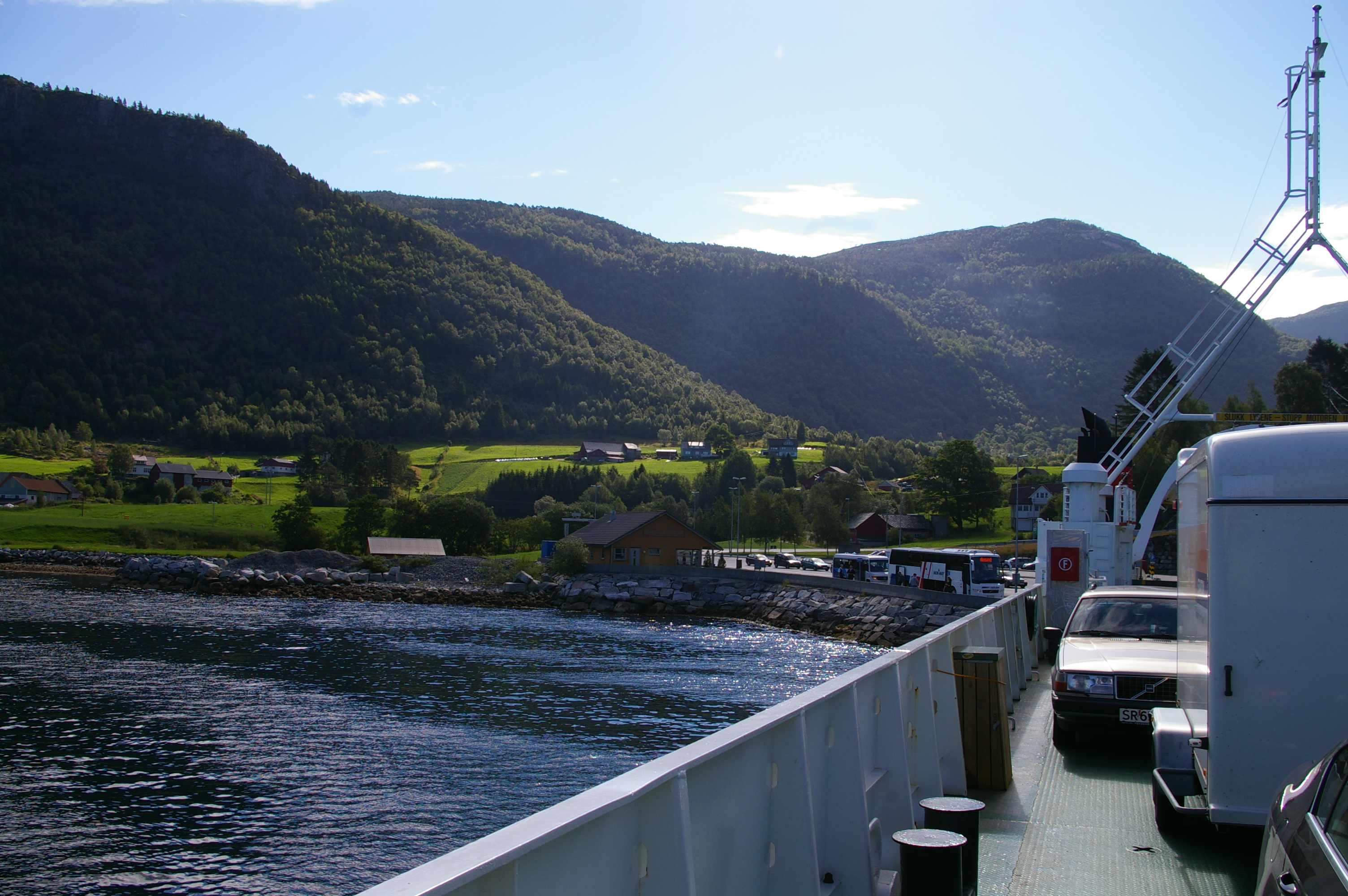
- View of the ferry quay at Ytre Oppedal seen from the ferry MF Svanøy on the Lavik-Oppedal route
- Interactive map of Oppedal; Ytre Oppedal
- Location within Vestland Location within Norway
- Coordinates: 61.05686°N 5.51196°E
- Country: Norway
- Region: Western Norway
- County: Vestland
- District: Sogn
- Municipality: Gulen Municipality
- Elevation: 7 m (23 ft)
- Time zone: UTC+01:00 (CET)
  - Summer (DST): UTC+02:00 (CEST)
- Post Code: 5961 Brekke

Ytre Oppedal or Oppedal is a village and ferry terminal in Gulen Municipality in Vestland county, Norway. It lies on the shores of the Oppedalsvika inlet along the south side of the Sognefjorden, east of where the Risnefjorden empties into the Sognefjorden. The village lies on both sides of the river Oppedalselva, which flows directly to the ferry port. The village of Brekke lies west of Oppedal, on the opposite side of the Risnefjorden.

The European route E39 highway runs north to Oppedal to the ferry quay at Ytre Oppdal where the highway crosses the Sognefjorden via MV Ampere ferry route to the village of Lavik in Høyanger Municipality where it continues to the north. The Norwegian County Road 8 (Fv8) runs from Oppedal to the east to the neighboring village of Indre Oppedal and then it keeps going east into Høyanger Municipality.
