= Brekke Church =

Church in Vestland, Norway

- Brekke kyrkje
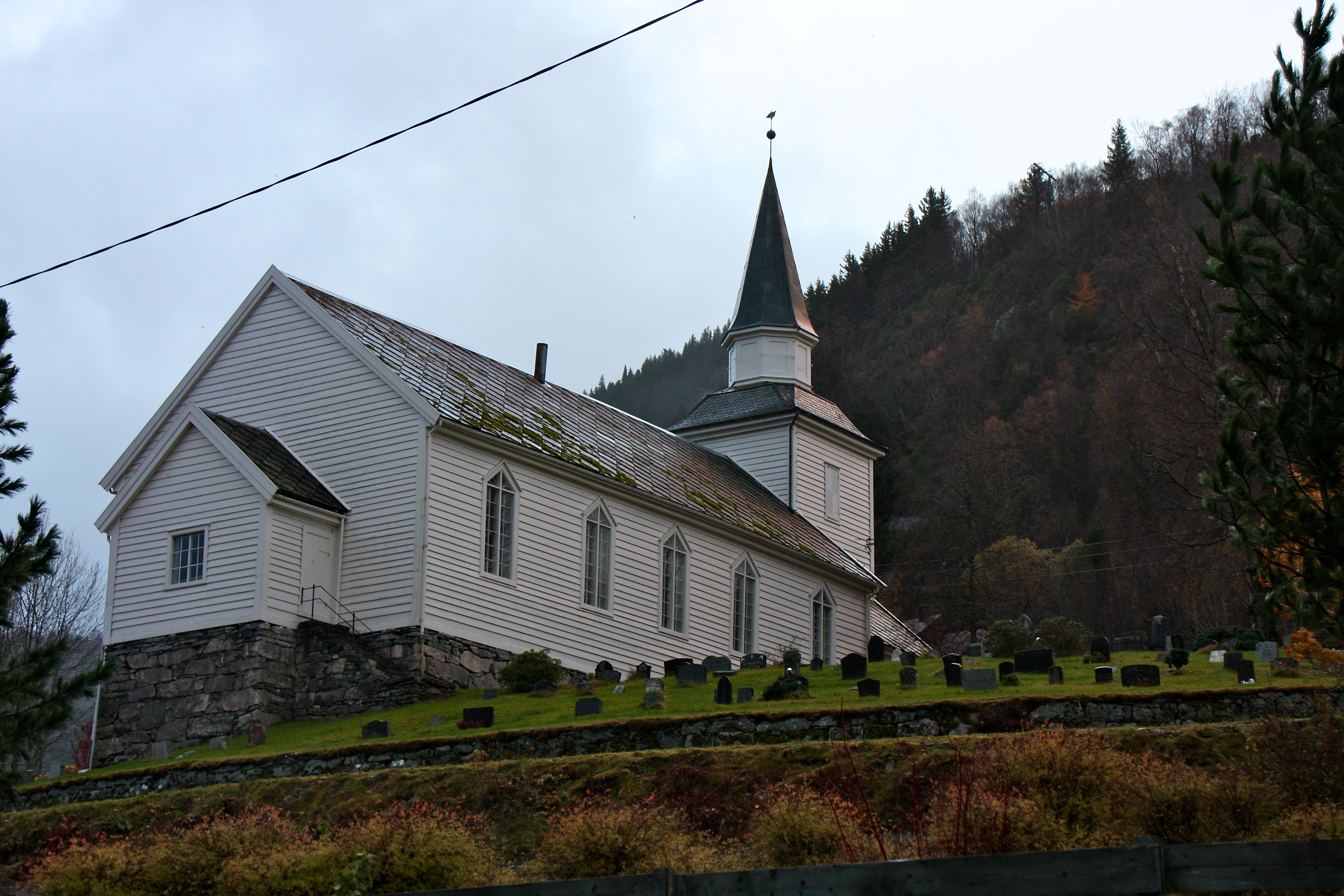
- View of the church
- Brekke Church
- 61°01′10″N 5°27′36″E
- Location: Gulen Municipality, Vestland
- Country: Norway
- Denomination: Church of Norway
- Previous denomination: Catholic Church
- Churchmanship: Evangelical Lutheran

History
- Former name: Risnefjord Church
- Status: Parish church
- Founded: 13th century
- Consecrated: 19 Nov 1862

Architecture
- Functional status: Active
- Architect: Christian Heinrich Grosch
- Architectural type: Long church
- Completed: 1862 (164 years ago)

Specifications
- Capacity: 390
- Materials: Wood

Administration
- Diocese: Bjørgvin bispedømme
- Deanery: Nordhordland prosti
- Parish: Brekke
- Norwegian Cultural Heritage Site
- Type: Church
- Status: Not protected
- ID: 83949

Brekke Church (Norwegian: Brekke kyrkje) is a parish church of the Church of Norway in Gulen Municipality in Vestland county, Norway. It is located in the village of Brekke. It is the church for the Brekke parish which is part of the Nordhordland prosti (deanery) in the Diocese of Bjørgvin. The white, wooden church was built in a long church design in 1862 using plans drawn up by the architect Christian Henrik Grosch. The church seats about 390 people.

== History ==
The earliest existing historical records of the church at Brekke date back to the year 1327, but it was not new that year. The first church was likely a wooden stave church that was built during the 13th century. The church was originally known as the Risnefjord Church (Old Norse: Risnapyrdi), after the local fjord (it was later named Brekke Church). There was also a small annex chapel located on the Haugland farm, about 400 metres (1,300 ft) to the south of the village of Brekke. Both churches are mentioned in the same source from 1327. The Haugland Chapel is not mentioned in any sources after about 1340.

Around 1591, the old church was torn down and a new church was built in the village of Brekke, just up the hill from the shoreline. In 1686, the wooden church was described as a small, log building with tower. The nave measured about 9.4 by 6.9 metres (31 ft × 23 ft) and the choir measured 5.6 by 3.8 metres (18 ft × 12 ft). At that time, the building was described as in poor condition and uneven. The church had only room for 130 people and it was less than half the size of what the law required. The Church Act of 1851 instructed local authorities to ensure that the churches should have room for at least 30% of the population of the parish. This (eventually) led to the old church being torn down and replaced.

In 1862, a new church was constructed just south of the old church. The new church was designed by Christian Henrik Grosch and Anders Basteson Isdal was the lead builder. The new church was consecrated on 19 November 1862 by the local Dean Thomas Erichsen. After the new church was consecrated, the old church was torn down. The new church was larger, having a nave measuring 16.8 by 10.2 metres (55 ft × 33 ft) and a square choir with each side measuring 5.1 metres (17 ft). At first there was a high and narrow tower, but it could not withstand the wind very well. In 1884, the tower was demolished and a new tower was built. The new tower was much lower and wider, not much higher than the roof on the nave. This new tower was not popular and many residents complained. In 1939, the tower and church porch were both rebuilt using a design by Lars Norevik. The new tower was taller and covered with a copper roof and the church porch was larger and wider to make room for some storage and meeting rooms.

== See also ==
- List of churches in Bjørgvin
