= Sognefjord =

Fjord in Norway

Sognefjorden
- Sognefjord
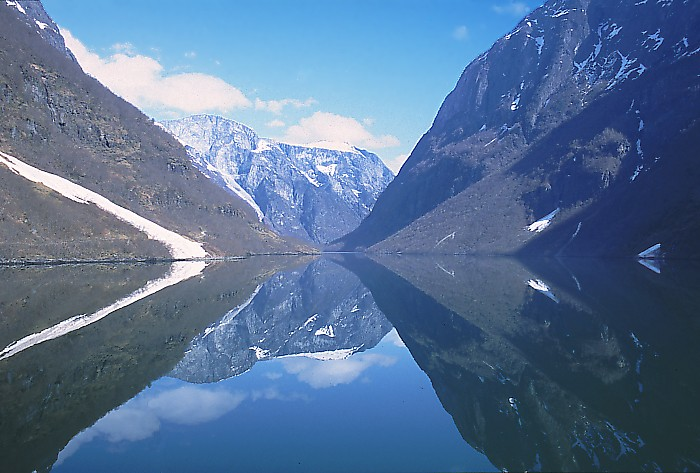
- View of the fjord

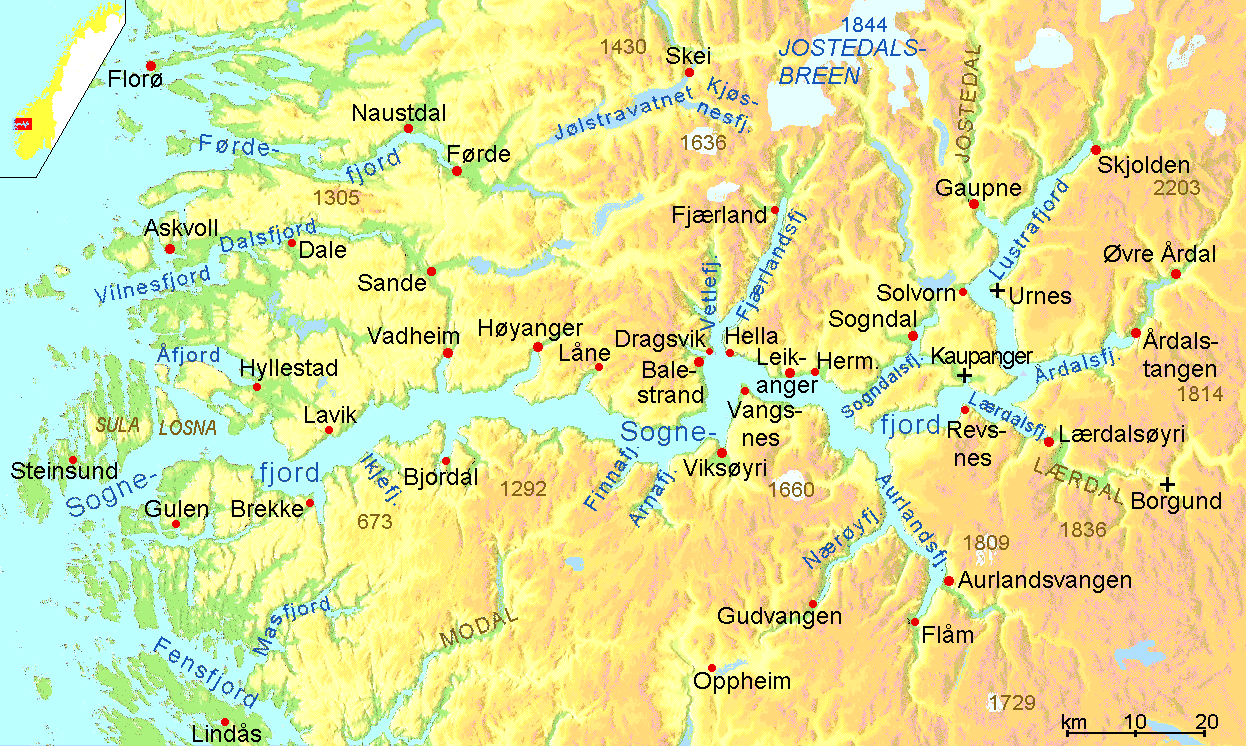

- Location within Vestland
- Location: Vestland county, Norway
- Coordinates: 61°06′N 5°10′E
- Basin countries: Norway
- Max. length: 205 km (127 mi)
- Max. width: 4.5 km (2.8 mi)
- Max. depth: 1,308 m (4,291 ft)

The Sognefjord or Sognefjorden (Urban East Norwegian: [ˈsɔ̂ŋnəˌfjuːɳ], English: Sogn Fjord), nicknamed the King of the Fjords (Norwegian: Fjordenes konge), is the longest and deepest fjord in Norway. Located in Vestland county in Western Norway, it stretches 205 kilometres (127 mi) inland from the ocean to the small village of Skjolden in Luster Municipality.

The fjord gives its name to the surrounding district of Sogn. The name is related to the Norwegian word súg- "to suck", presumably from the surge or suction of the tidal currents at the mouth of the fjord.

== Geography ==
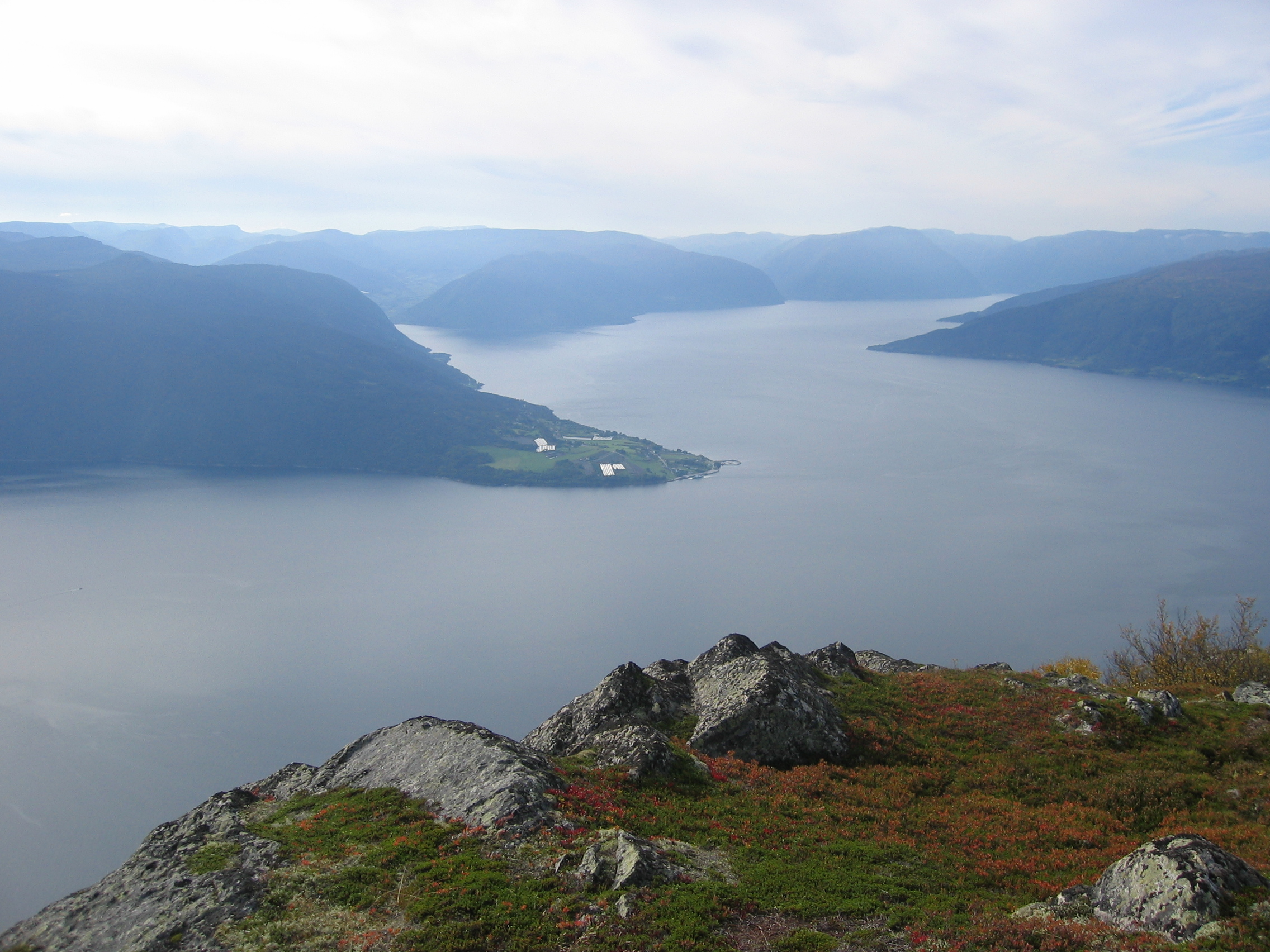
View of the fjord near Vangsnes

The fjord runs through many municipalities: Solund, Gulen, Hyllestad, Høyanger, Vik, Sogndal, Lærdal, Aurland, Årdal, and Luster. The fjord reaches a maximum depth of 1,308 metres (4,291 ft) below sea level, and the greatest depths are found in the central parts of the fjord near Høyanger. Sognefjord is more than 1,000 metres (3,300 ft) deep for about 100 kilometres (60 mi) of its length, from Rutledal to Hermansverk. Near its mouth, the bottom rises abruptly to a sill about 100 metres (330 ft) below sea level. The seabed in Sognefjord is covered by some 200-metre-thick (660 ft) sediments such that the bedrock is some 1,500 metres (4,900 ft) below sea level. The fjord is up to six kilometres (3 1/2 mi) wide. The average width of the main branch of the Sognefjord is less than five kilometres (3 mi). The depth increases gradually from Årdal to a central basin reaching more than 1,000 metres (3,300 ft) in depth located between Leikanger and Brekke. From Brekke the floor rises rapidly to Losna island, then drops gradually with a threshold at about 150 metres (500 ft) in the Solund area. Thresholds occur in an area with sounds, valleys, and low land where the glacier was allowed to spread out and lose its erosive effect.

Cliffs surrounding the fjord rise almost sheer from the water to heights of 1,000 metres (3,300 ft) and more. Around the outer area the land rises to about 500 metres (1,600 ft) above the sea, while in the inner areas of the fjord, they reach about 1,600 metres (5,200 ft). The inner part has extensive tributary fjords such as Aurlandsfjorden, while the outer part is connected by narrow sounds to neighbouring fjords. Near the coast the fjord mouth is bounded largely by low islands and skerries that are part of the strandflat.

The inner end of the Sognefjord is southeast of a mountain range rising to about 2,000 metres (6,600 ft) above sea level and covered by the Jostedalsbreen, continental Europe's largest glacier. Thus the climate of the inner end of Sognefjorden and its branches are not as wet as on the outer coastline. Hurrungane range at the eastern end of the fjord reaches 2,400 metres (7,900 ft). The greatest elevation from seabed to summit is in Sogndal Municipality. Several rivers pour fresh water into the fjord with an annual "spring" flood in June. The mouth of the fjord is surrounded by many islands including Sula, Losna, and Hiserøyna. The Sognefjord cuts through a northwestern gneiss area with a south-west to north-east structure, and penetrates the Caledonian fold through in the inner part. There is no clear relation between the east–west direction of the main fjord and the fold patterns of the bedrock, while some of the tributary fjords in these parts correspond to the fold pattern.

The volume of the whole Sognefjorden including its various branches is about 500 cubic kilometres (120 cu mi), while the total volume of rock eroded by glaciers from the entire Sognefjord system and adjacent valleys is about 4,000 cubic kilometres (960 cu mi).

=== Branches ===
There are many smaller fjords which branch off the main fjord.

- Sognesjøen (mouth), 35 km (21 1/2 mi)
- Lifjorden, 6 km (3 1/2 mi)
- Høyangsfjord, 8 km (5 mi)
- Arnafjord, 8 km (5 mi)
- Esefjord, 4 km (2 1/2 mi)
- Fjærlandsfjord, 27 km (17 mi)
- Sogndalsfjord, 21 km (13 mi)
- Aurlandsfjord, 29 km (18 mi)
- Nærøyfjord (a World Heritage Site), 18 km (11 mi)
- Lærdalsfjord, 9 km (5 1/2 mi)
- Årdalsfjord, 16 km (10 mi)
- Lustrafjord (innermost), 42 km (26 mi)

=== Lustrafjorden ===
The innermost arm of the Sognefjorden is called the Lustrafjord, in the municipality of Luster. At its end is the village of Skjolden, which is an access point to Jotunheimen National Park. In earlier times, transport between Bergen and the Scandinavian inland was by boat between Bergen and Skjolden and from there on a simple road over the highlands (today Norwegian County Road 55), or by boat to Lærdal and through the mountain pass to Valdres (now European route E16).

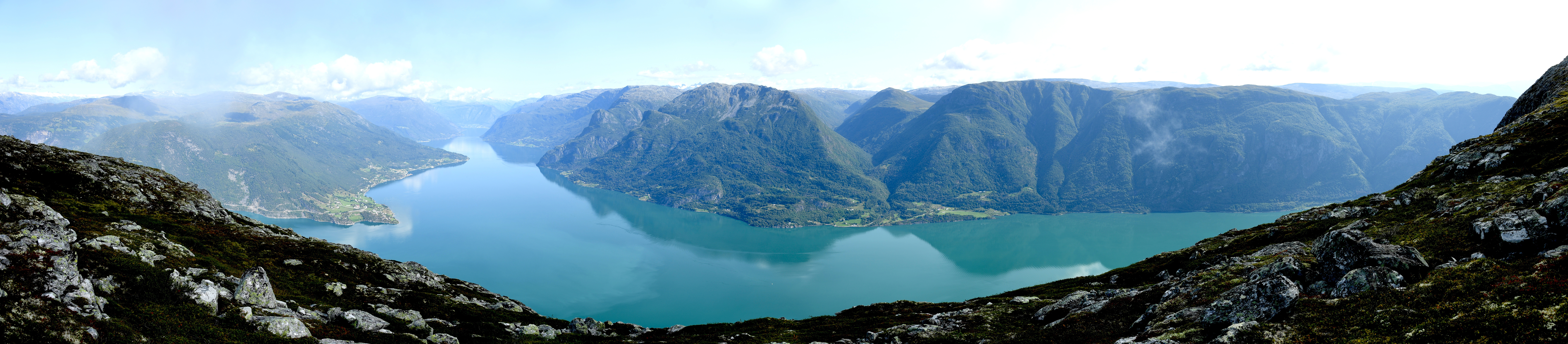
Panorama of Lustrafjord viewed from the mountain Molden

== Origin and geology ==
The valley of Sognefjord is one of various valleys of western Norway that certainly predates the Quaternary glaciations. It existed already as part of the ancient Paleic surface but had at the time much gentler slopes. The fjords of western Norway formed in connection to the east-ward tilting of much of Norway during the Cenozoic uplift of the Scandinavian Mountains. This uplift, that occurred long before the Quaternary glaciations, enabled rivers to incise deeply the Paleic relief. An estimate of 7610 km^{3} of rock has been eroded from the Sognefjord drainage basin since the Paleic surface formed. The fluvial and glacial erosion that made the fjords has followed structural weaknesses in the crust.

During the last glaciation the ice reached a maximum thickness of nearly 3,000 meters in the Sognefjord area. Confluence of tributary fjords led to the excavation of the deepest fjord basin. Until about 30 km from the very coast the Sognefjord glacier was apparently constricted to its narrow channel of homogeneous gneiss, then the glacier suddenly spread out presumably through sounds and low valleys.

== Tourism ==
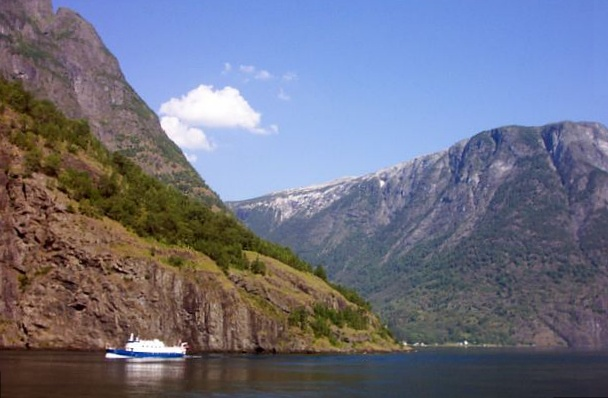
Nærøyfjord

1853 painting of Sognefjord by Hans Gude and Adolph Tidemand.

Boats connect settlements along the fjord and its sidearms. Larger villages on the fjord and its branches include Leirvik, Ytre Oppedal, Vadheim, Høyanger, Vikøyri, Balestrand, Hermansverk, Sogndalsfjøra, Gudvangen, Flåm, Aurlandsvangen, Lærdalsøyri, Årdalstangen, Gaupne and Solvorn. Gudvangen is situated by the Nærøyfjord, a branch of the Sognefjord particularly noted for its unspoiled nature and dramatic scenery, and only 300 metres (1,000 ft) across at its narrowest point. Together with the Geirangerfjord in Møre og Romsdal, the Nærøyfjord is a UNESCO World Heritage Site. From the village of Flåm, the Flåm Railway climbs 864 metres (2,835 ft) up to Myrdal Station over a distance of only 20 kilometres (12 mi)— one of the steepest unassisted railway climbs in the world.

Around the inner end of the fjord, three of Norway's famous stave churches have survived: Kaupanger and Urnes (along the shoreline) and Borgund (30 km or 20 mi into the Lærdal valley).

The Sognefjord Span (power lines) crosses the fjord with a span of 4,597 metres (15,082 ft). This is the second largest span of power lines in the world. The fjord has become a tourist attraction with summer tourists being an important part of the local economy.

== Transport ==
There is a plan to build a road across the Sognefjord, crossing through a submerged tube in mid-water anchored to floats. This will avoid storms on the surface, and will not have to go over a kilometer deep to get below the bed of the fjord.

There are many ferry crossings of the Sognefjord. One of the ferryboats that traverses this fjord is the MV Ampere, the world's first battery-electric car ferry, which crosses the fjord between the villages of Lavik and Oppedal.

== Other ==
- On 24 November 1972, the submarine KNM Sklinna of the Royal Norwegian Navy had "contact" with what they presumed was a Russian Whiskey-class submarine after a 14-day pursuit in the Sognefjord. Military documents released later confirm this episode.

== See also ==
- List of Norwegian fjords
