= Sogn =

- District
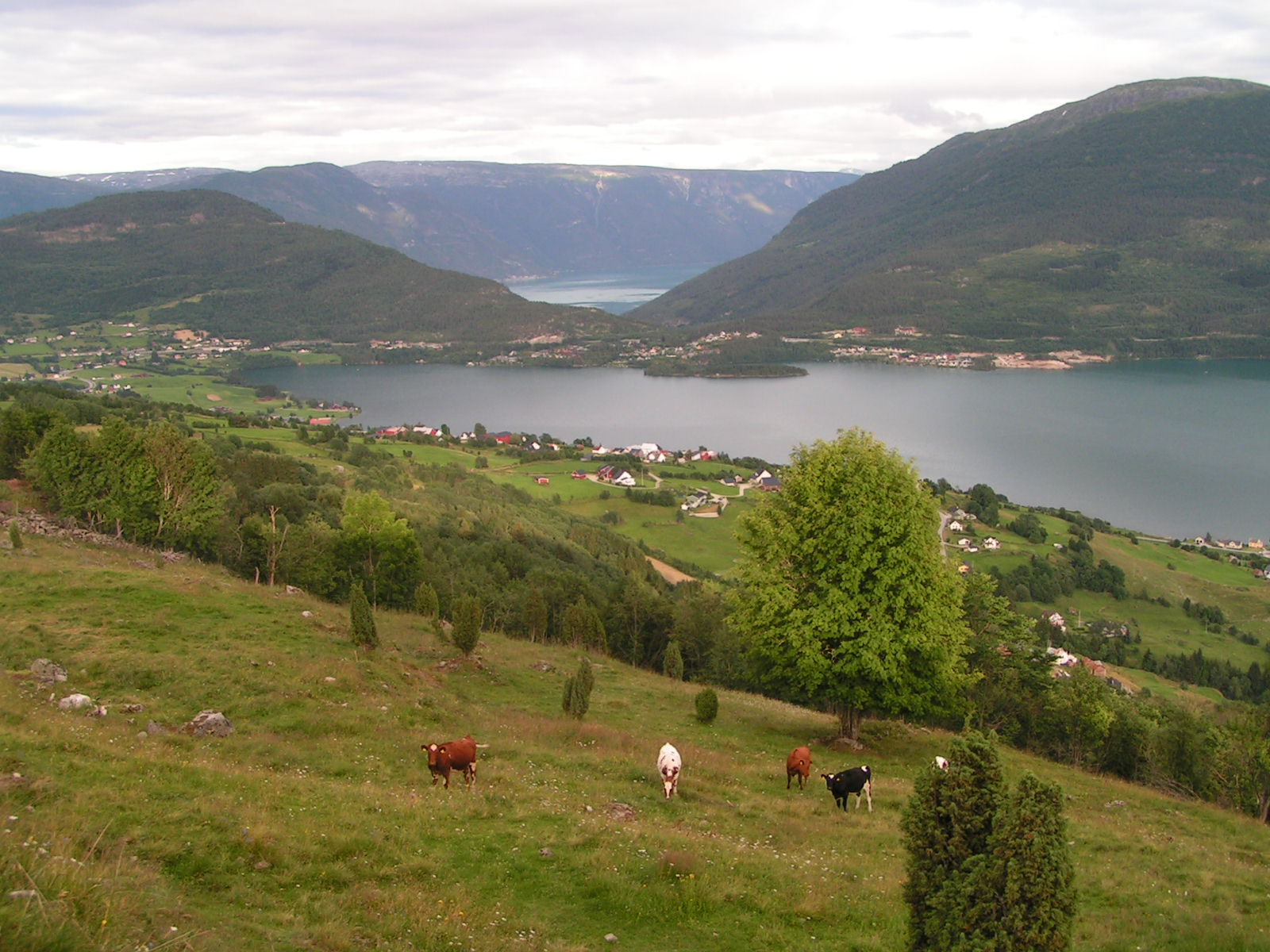
- Hafslovatnet with Sognefjord behind

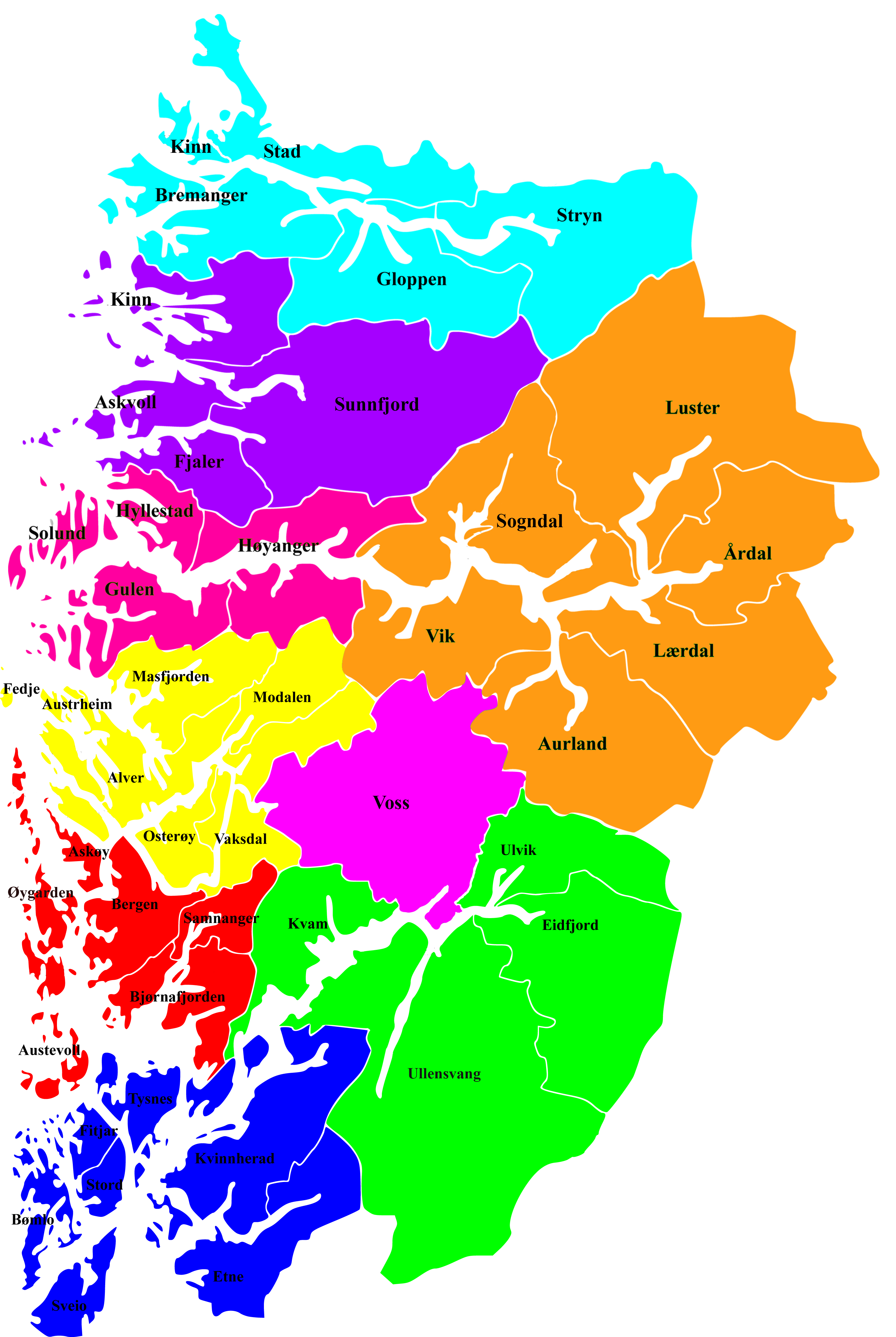
- Districts of Vestland: Nordfjord Sunnfjord Inner Sogn Outer Sogn Nordhordland Midthordland Sunnhordland Hardanger Voss
- Coordinates: 61°11′N 06°48′E
- Country: Norway
- County: Vestland
- Region: Vestlandet
- Largest settlement: Sogndalsfjøra

Area
  - Total: 10,675 km^{2} (4,122 sq mi)

Population (2006)
  - Total: 38,858
  - Density: 3.6401/km^{2} (9.4278/sq mi)
- Demonym: Sogning

Sogn is a traditional district in Western Norway (Norwegian: Vestlandet). It is located in the county of Vestland, surrounding the Sognefjord, the largest/longest fjord in Norway. The district of Sogn consists of the municipalities of Aurland, Hyllestad, Høyanger, Gulen, Luster, Lærdal, Sogndal, Solund, Vik, and Årdal.

The district covers 10,675 square kilometres (4,122 sq mi). The largest urban area in Sogn is the village of Sogndalsfjøra (in Sogndal Municipality), with 4,475 residents. The second largest urban area is the village Øvre Årdal (in Årdal Municipality), with 3,094 people (this village used to be the largest, but recently it was passed by Sogndalsfjøra).

The district of Sogn comprises the southern part of the former county Sogn og Fjordane. The districts of Sunnfjord and Nordfjord are the other two districts in the county.

== Etymology ==
The name Sogn derived from the name of the Sognefjorden. The name of the fjord is from the root of súga which means "to suck", referring to the strong tidal streams at the mouth of the fjord. An old name for the district is Sygnafylki. The first element in this name is the genitive of sygnir which means "people from Sogn" and the last element is fylki which means "county".

== History ==
Historical population
Year	1769	1951	1960	1970	1980	1990	2000	2010	2020
Pop.	19,366	41,846	40,558	40,254	39,689	38,996	37,841	36,511	36,232
±% p.a.	—	+0.42%	−0.35%	−0.08%	−0.14%	−0.18%	−0.30%	−0.36%	−0.08%
Source: Statistics Norway.

=== Viking Age ===
Since early in the Viking Age, Sogn was a petty kingdom called Sygnafylki. Some notable Kings of Sogn were Harald Gullskjegg ("Goldbeard", father of Ragnhild, first wife of Halfdan the Black), Halfdan the Black, and Harald Fairhair.

=== 1662-present ===
In 1662, Sogn fogderi was created as part of the Nordre Bergenhus amt (county). Sogn was further divided into Indre Sogn (lit. 'Inner Sogn') and Ytre Sogn (lit. 'Outer Sogn').

- Indre Sogn consisted of the inner half of the district which included the modern municipalities of Aurland, Leikanger, Luster, Lærdal, Sogndal, and Årdal. The village of Sogndalsfjøra was the administrative center.
- Ytre Sogn consisted of the modern municipalities of Balestrand, Gulen, Hyllestad, Høyanger, Solund, and Vik. The village of Høyanger was the administrative center.

In 1919, Nordre Bergenhus amt was renamed Sogn og Fjordane fylke.

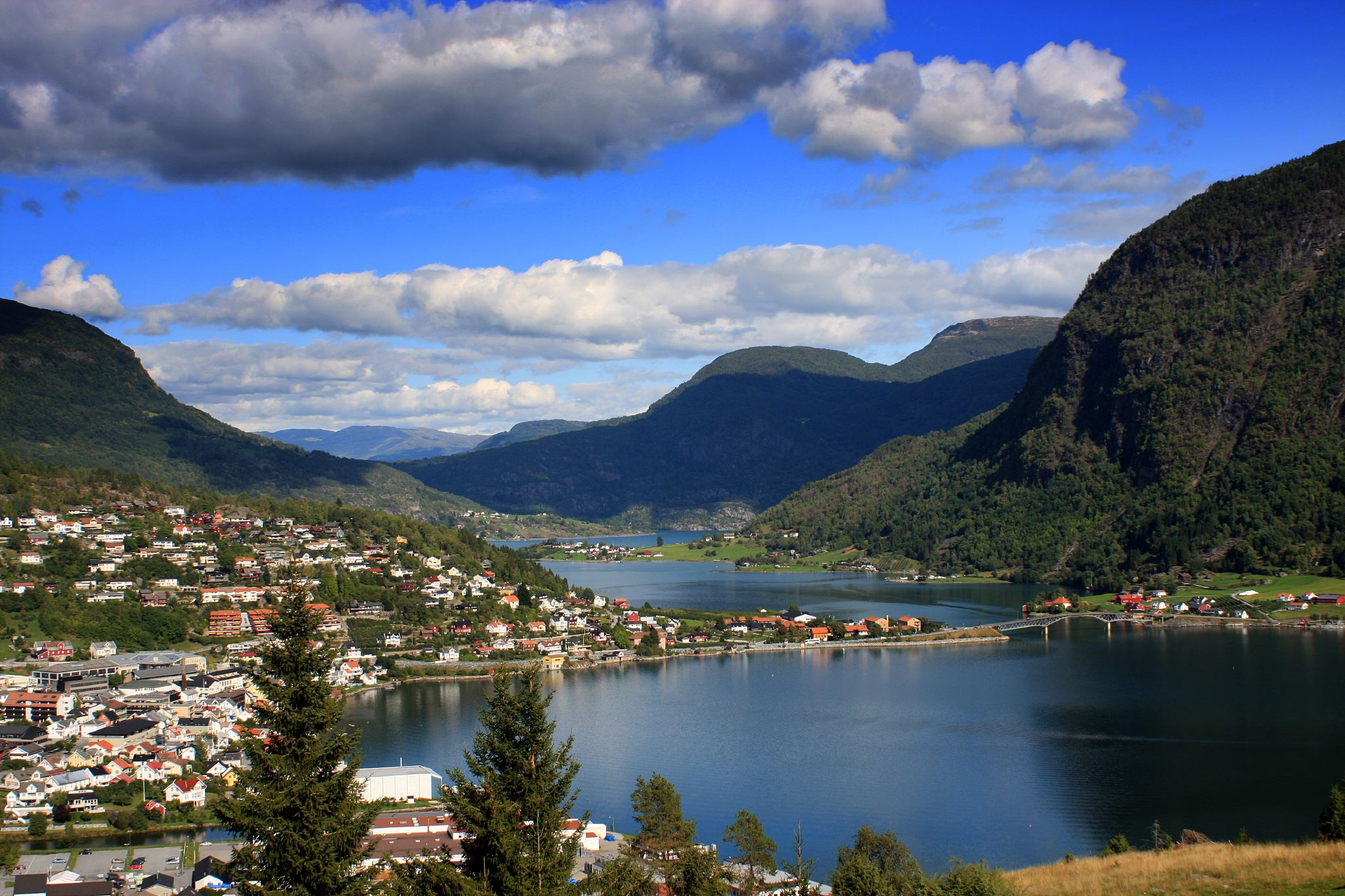
Sogndalsfjorden and Barsnesfjorden.

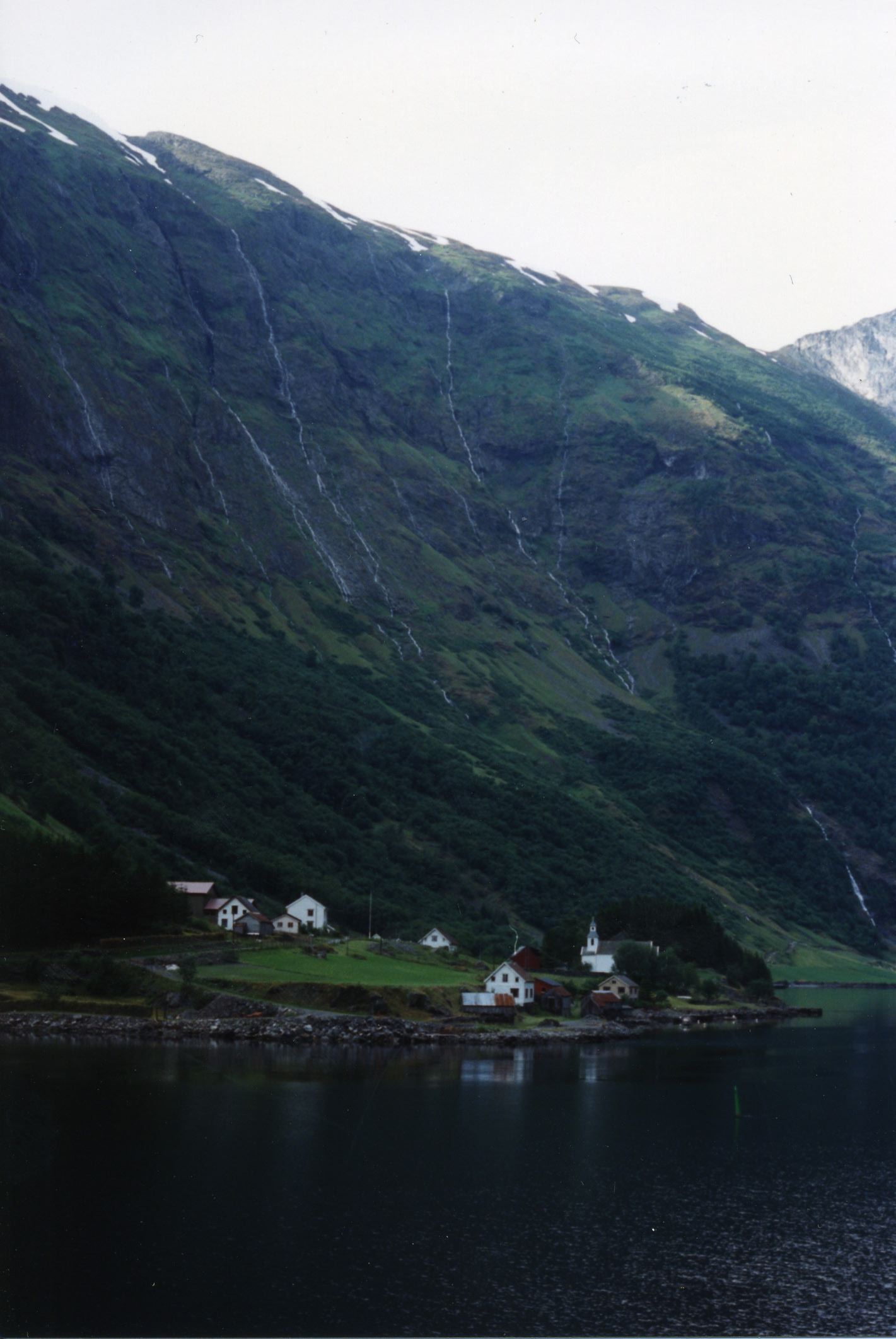
Shore community in Sogn, Norway.

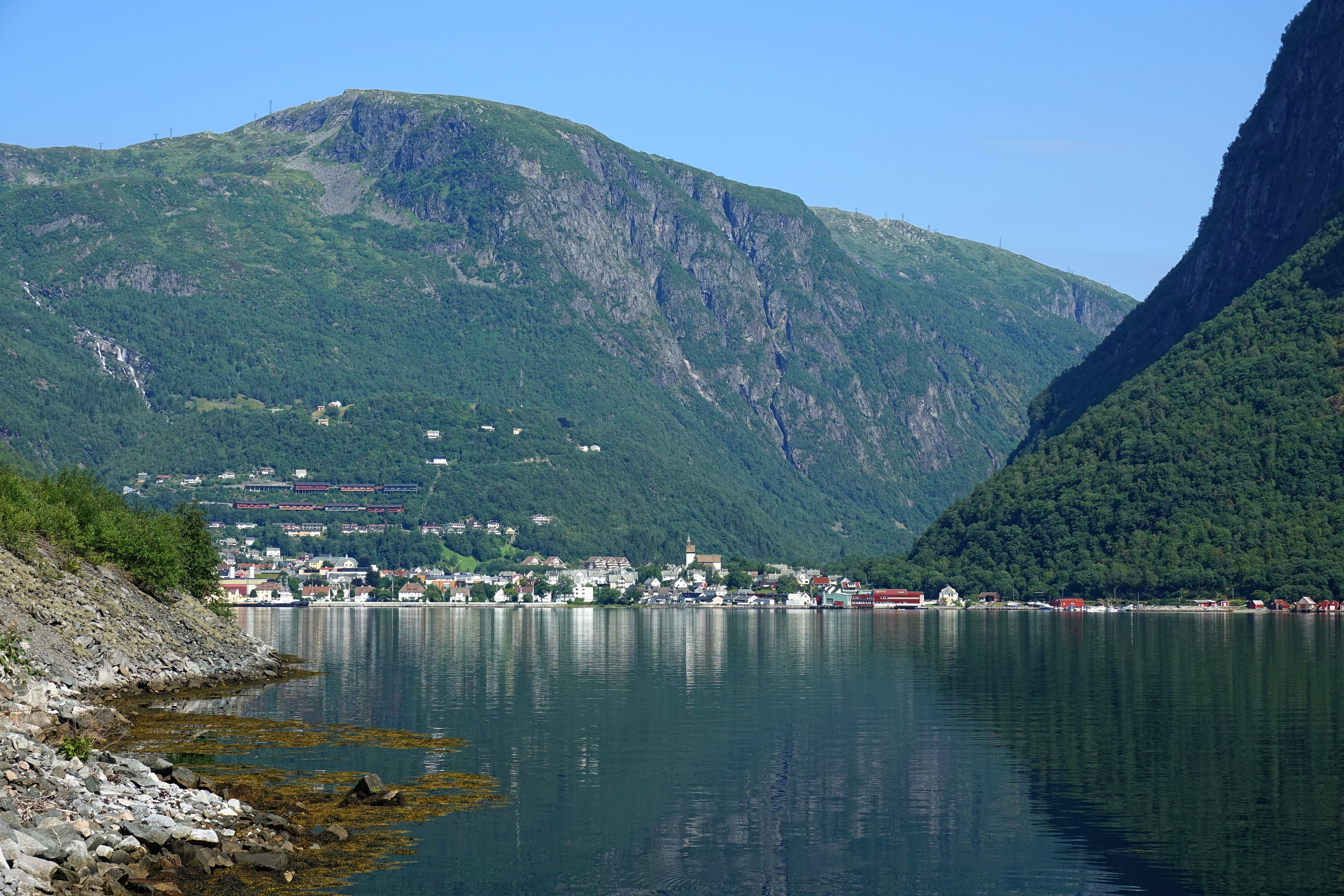
Village of Høyanger

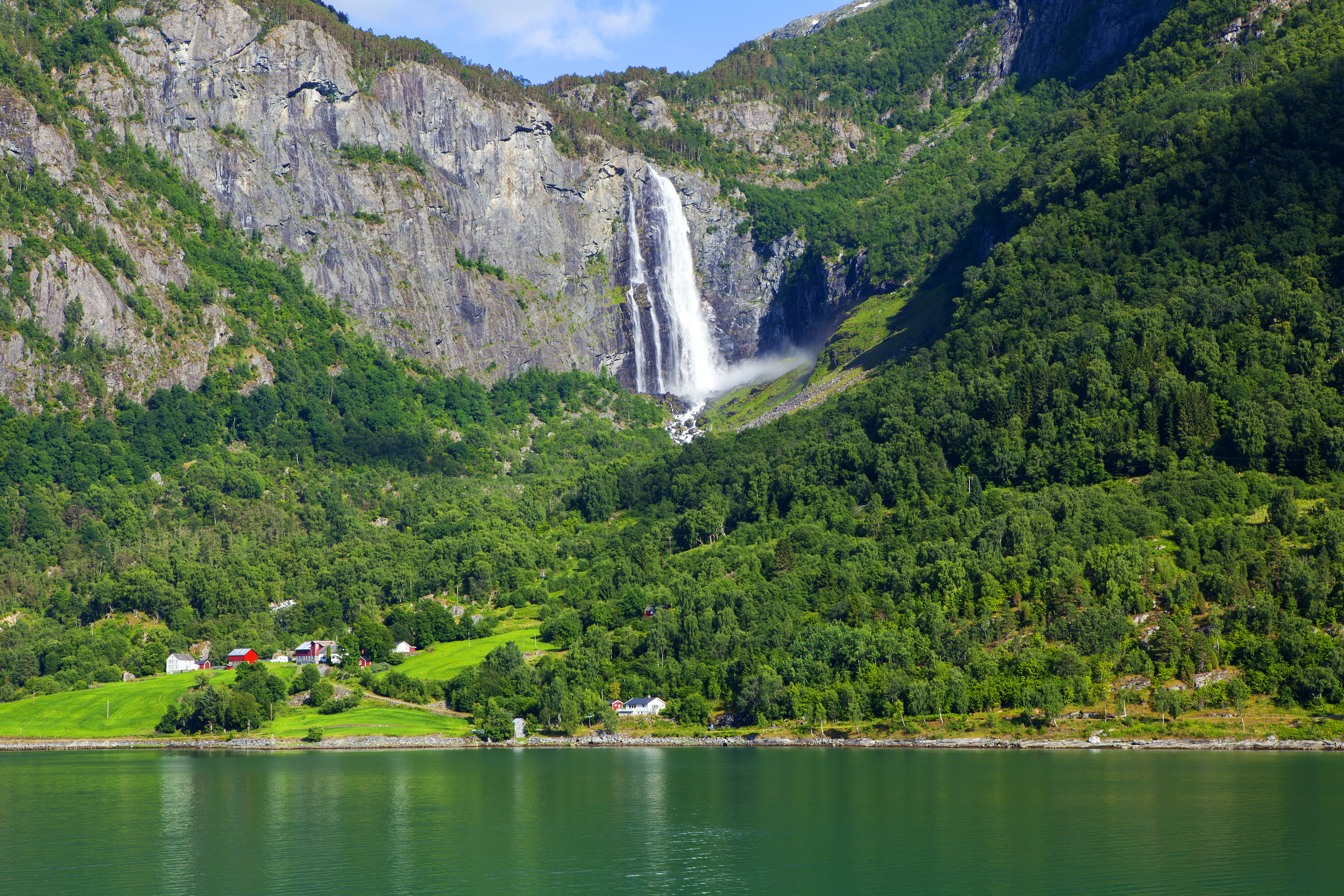
Shoreline of the Sognefjorden
