= Fiksdal Church =

Church in Møre og Romsdal, Norway

- Fiksdal kyrkje
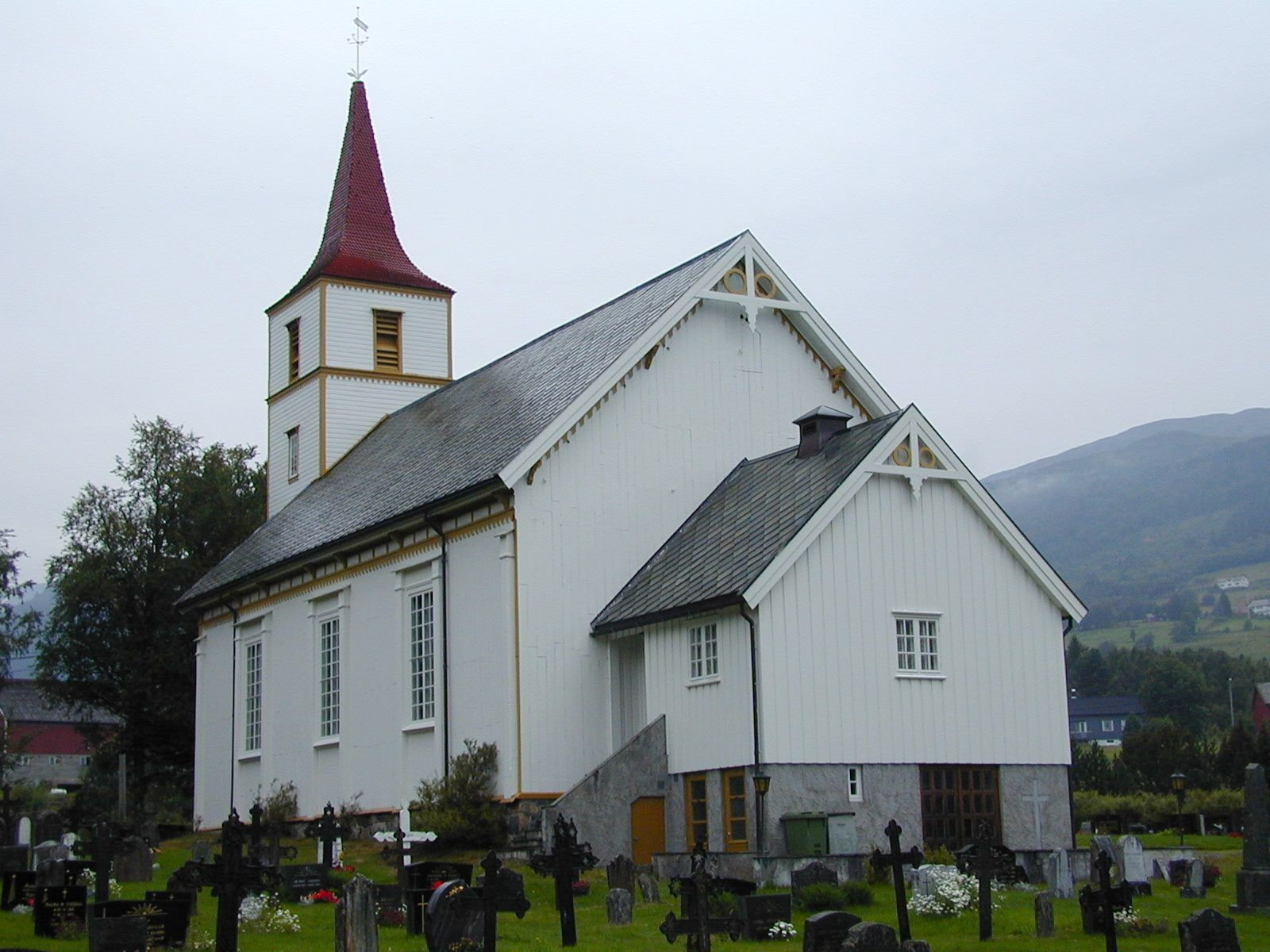
- View of the church
- Fiksdal Church
- 62°36′59″N 6°51′35″E
- Location: Vestnes Municipality, Møre og Romsdal
- Country: Norway
- Denomination: Church of Norway
- Churchmanship: Evangelical Lutheran

History
- Status: Parish church
- Founded: 1866
- Consecrated: 1866

Architecture
- Functional status: Active
- Architect: Jacob Wilhelm Nordan
- Architectural type: Long church
- Completed: 1866 (160 years ago)

Specifications
- Capacity: 200
- Materials: Wood

Administration
- Diocese: Møre bispedømme
- Deanery: Indre Romsdal prosti
- Parish: Fiksdal
- Norwegian Cultural Heritage Site
- Type: Church
- Status: Listed
- ID: 84131

Fiksdal Church (Norwegian: Fiksdal kyrkje) is a parish church of the Church of Norway in Vestnes Municipality in Møre og Romsdal county, Norway. It is located in the village of Fiksdal in the western part of the municipality. It is the church for the Fiksdal parish which is part of the Indre Romsdal prosti (deanery) in the Diocese of Møre. The white, wooden church was built in a long church style in 1866 using plans drawn up by the architect Jacob Wilhelm Nordan. The church seats about 200 people.

== History ==
Fiksdal Church was built by master carpenter Gjert Lien who used architectural drawings by Jacob Wilhelm Nordan. The same drawings were later used as a basis for the construction of Vågstranda Church (1870) and Otrøy Church (1878). The new building was consecrated in 1866. In 1965–1966, a sacristy was added to the east end of the building during a renovation and restoration of the building led by Ola Seter. On 15 June 2016, the church was set on fire in a case of arson. There was some exterior damage, but the interior of the church did not receive much damage. The church was repaired shortly afterwards.

== Media gallery ==
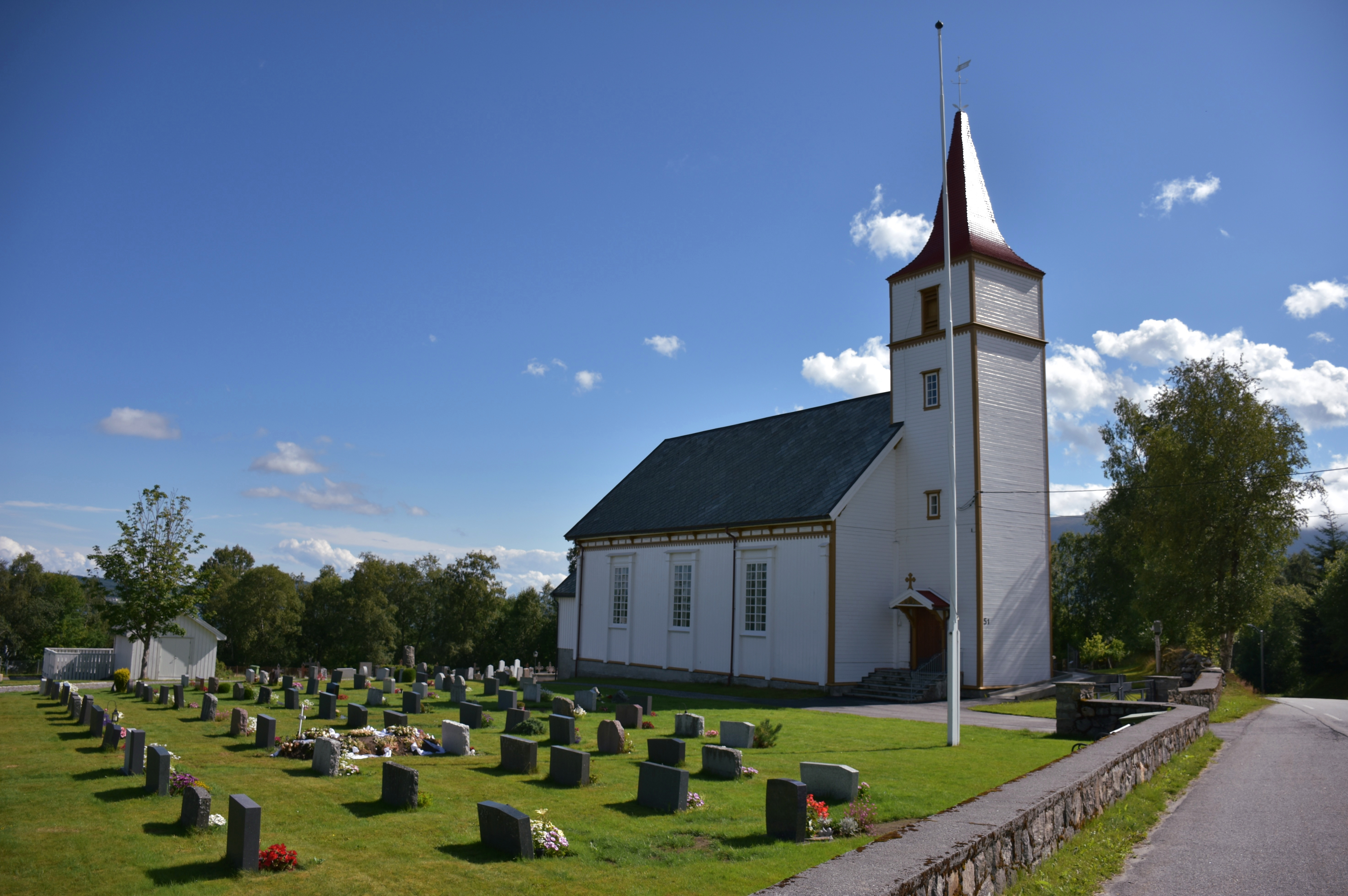
Exterior view

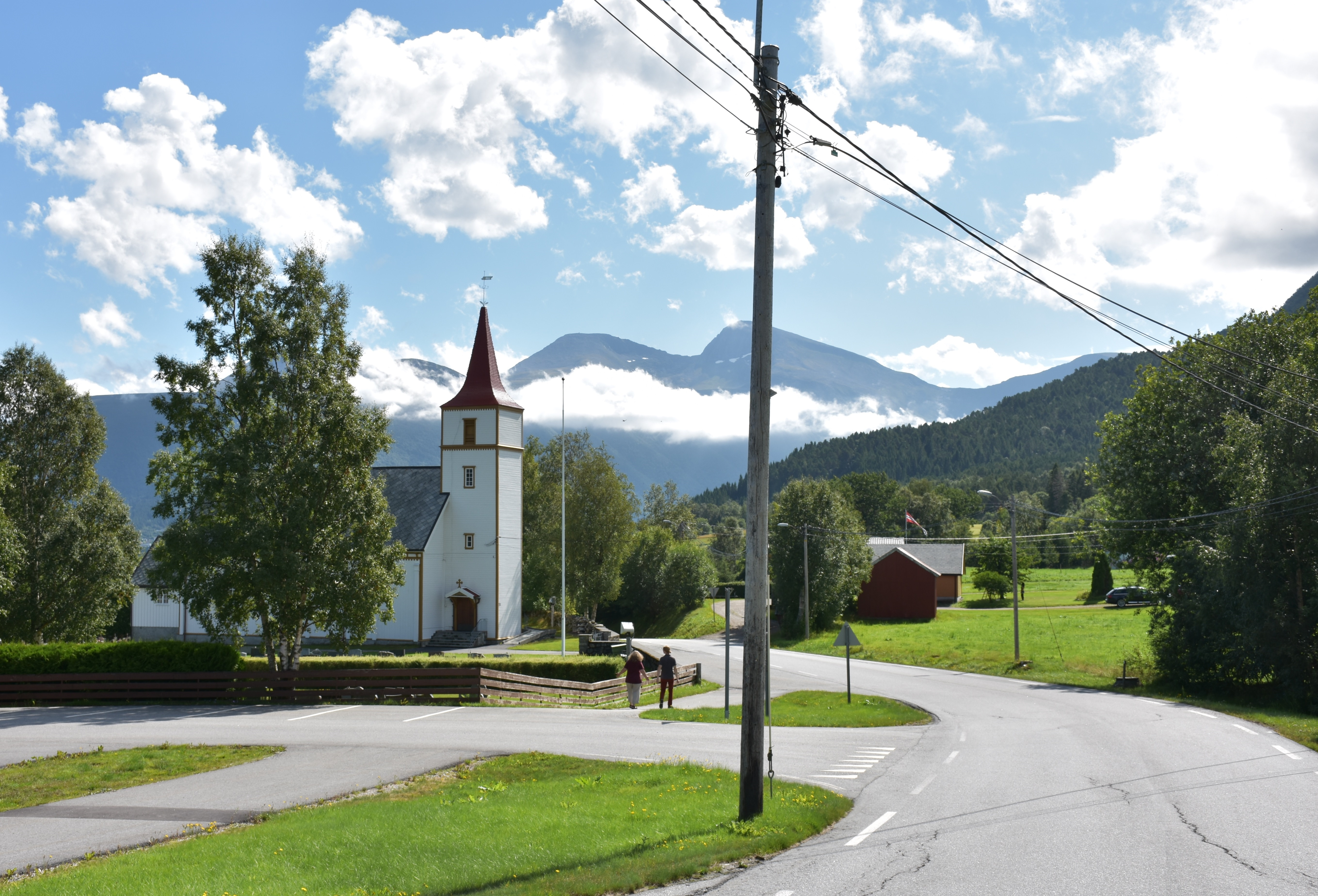
Exterior view

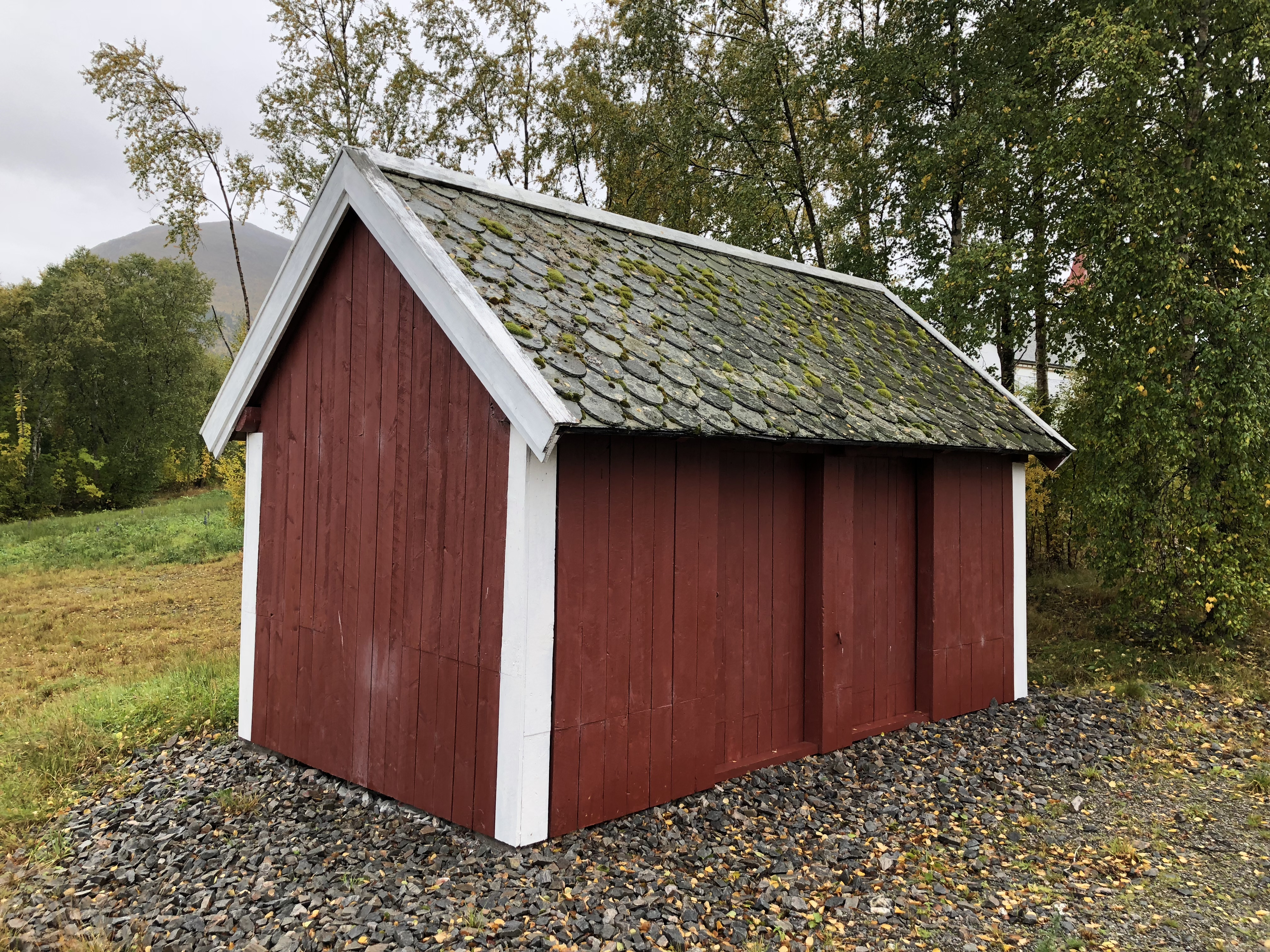
Storage building for the church

== See also ==
- List of churches in Møre
