= Kyrkjebø =

Kyrkjebø may refer to:

== Places ==
- Kyrkjebø (village), a village within Høyanger Municipality in Vestland county, Norway
- Kyrkjebø Municipality, a former municipality in the old Sogn og Fjordane county, Norway
- Kyrkjebø Church, a church in Høyanger Municipality in Vestland county, Norway

== People ==
- Sissel Kyrkjebø (born 1969), a Norwegian singer (also known simply as Sissel)
