= Bjordal Church =

Church in Vestland, Norway

- Bjordal kyrkje
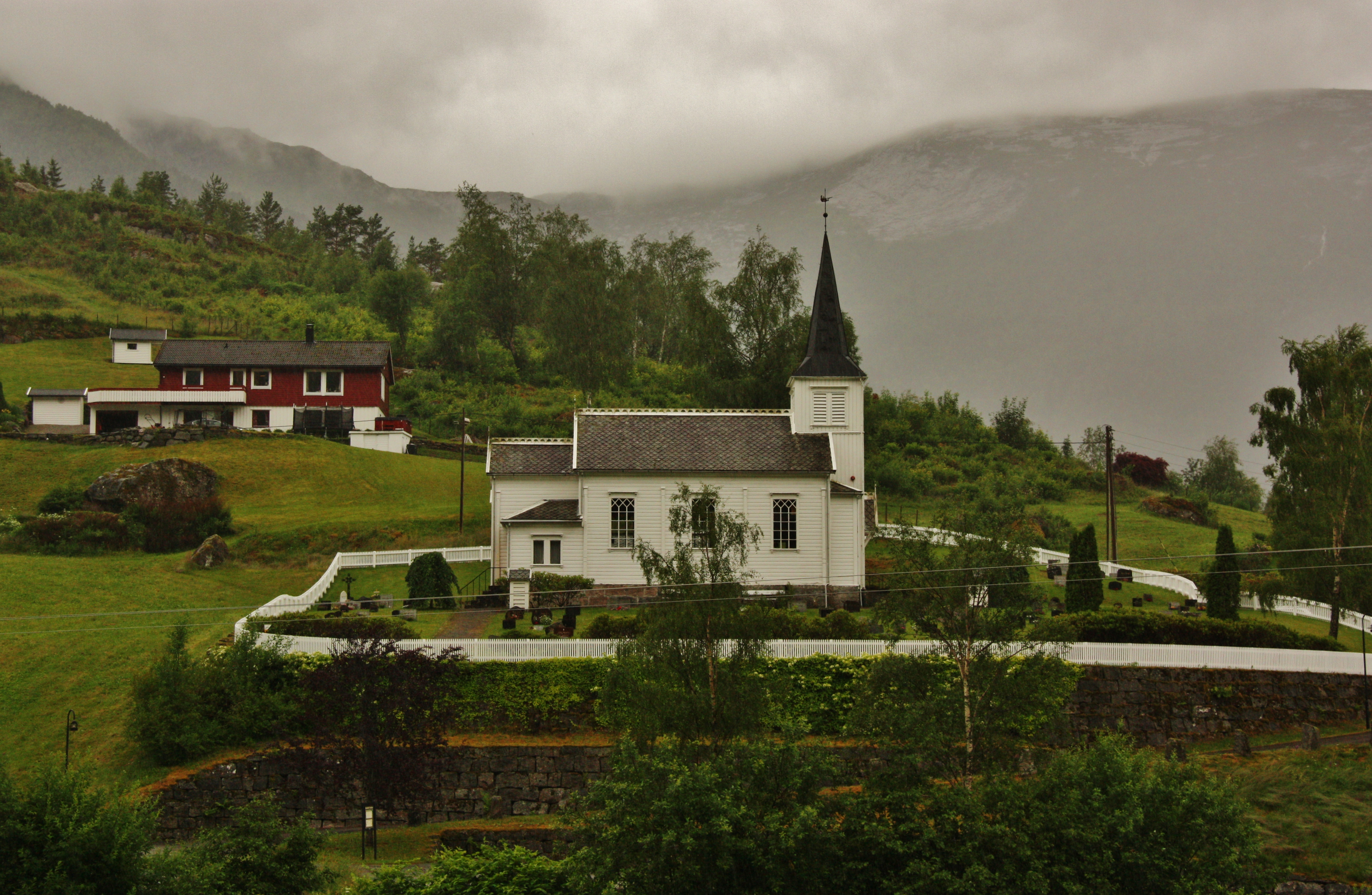
- View of the church
- Bjordal Church
- 61°04′31″N 5°49′44″E
- Location: Høyanger Municipality, Vestland
- Country: Norway
- Denomination: Church of Norway
- Churchmanship: Evangelical Lutheran

History
- Former name: Bjordal Chapel
- Status: Parish church
- Founded: 1906
- Consecrated: 1 Nov 1906

Architecture
- Functional status: Active
- Architect: Victor Nordan
- Architectural type: Long church
- Completed: 1906 (120 years ago)

Specifications
- Capacity: 160
- Materials: Wood

Administration
- Diocese: Bjørgvin bispedømme
- Deanery: Sunnfjord prosti
- Parish: Bjordal og Ortnevik
- Norwegian Cultural Heritage Site
- Type: Church
- Status: Not protected
- ID: 83900

Bjordal Church (Norwegian: Bjordal kyrkje) is a parish church of the Church of Norway in Høyanger Municipality in Vestland county, Norway. It is located in the village of Bjordal. It is one of the two churches for the Bjordal og Ortnevik parish which is part of the Sunnfjord prosti (deanery) in the Diocese of Bjørgvin. The white, wooden church was built in a long church design in 1906 using plans drawn up by the architect Victor Nordan, the son of the famous Norwegian church architect Jacob Wilhelm Nordan. The church seats about 160 people.

== History ==
The people living around the Fuglesetfjorden had long desired a church of their own. In 1856, the people of Bjordal had petitioned for a church to be built in their village, rather than making the 12-kilometre (7.5 mi) long journey to the Kyrkjebø Church on the other side of the fjord. Again in 1896, the people of Bjordal petitioned the government for their own church. It took three years, but in 1899, the government decided that an annex chapel (not a church) would be built. Planning began and after several years passed the church was completed. It was designed by Victor Nordan and it the lead builder was Jo Hove from Vik. The church was consecrated on 1 November 1906.

The nave of the new chapel measured about 10.5 by 8 metres (34 ft × 26 ft), the choir measured about 4 by 3.8 metres (13 ft × 12 ft), and the church porch measured about 1.6 by 2.6 metres (5 ft 3 in × 8 ft 6 in). The church is not large, but it has a picturesque location on a hilltop overlooking the fjord. In 1953, the chapel received electric lighting and then in 1958 electric heating was installed. It originally the status of a chapel (and was named Bjordal Chapel) until 1 January 1997 when it was upgraded to a church. At the same time the new parish of Bjordal og Ortnevik was created with Ortnevik Church and Bjordal Church being the parish churches. This meant that all the people in Høyanger on the south side of the Sognefjorden now had their own parish.

== See also ==
- List of churches in Bjørgvin
