= Ortnevik Church =

Church in Vestland, Norway

- Ortnevik kyrkje
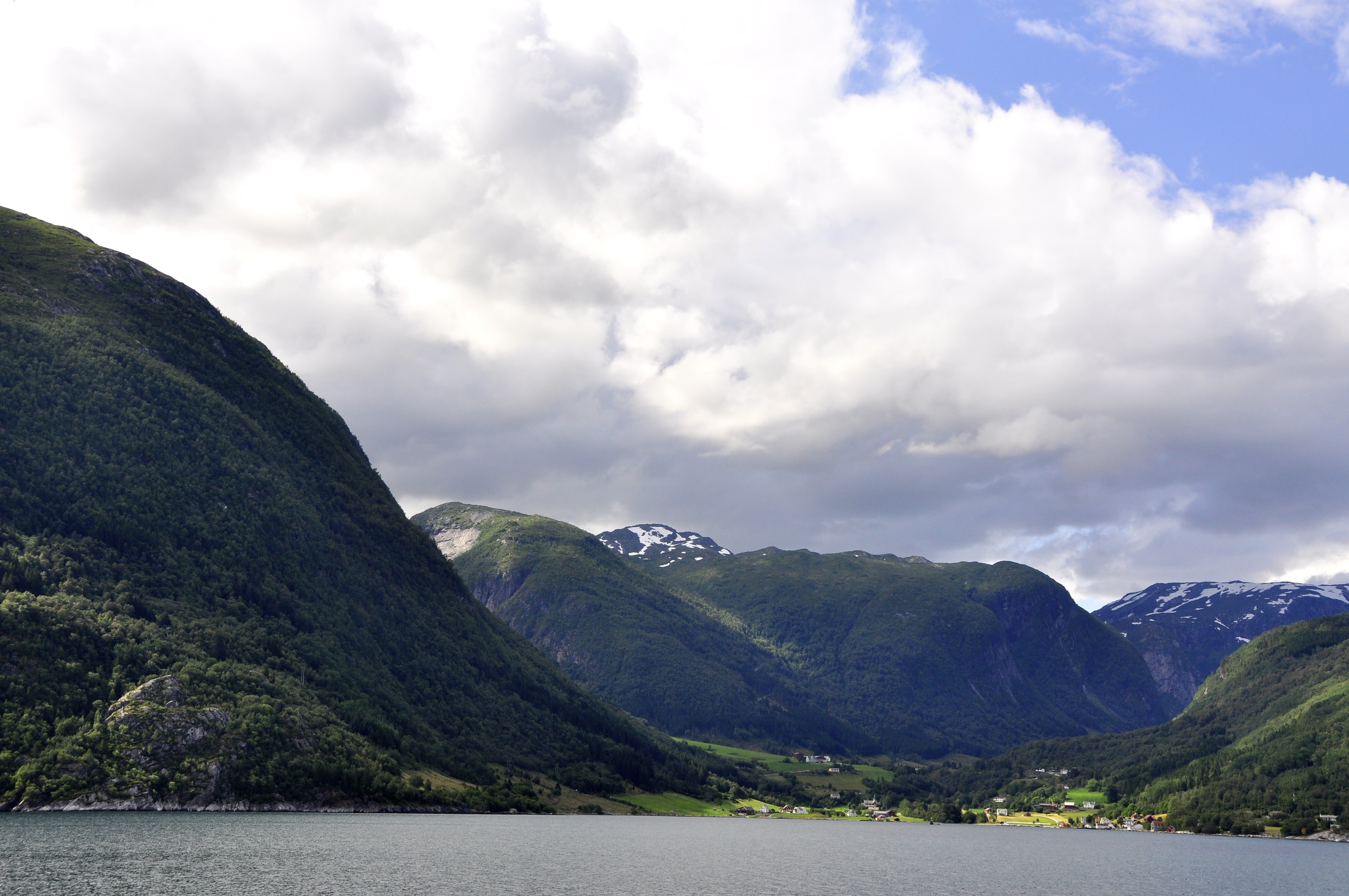
- View of Ortnevik (view full size and the red church is in the center of the picture)
- Ortnevik Church
- 61°06′26″N 6°07′50″E
- Location: Høyanger Municipality, Vestland
- Country: Norway
- Denomination: Church of Norway
- Churchmanship: Evangelical Lutheran

History
- Former name: Ortnevik Chapel
- Status: Parish church
- Founded: 1925
- Consecrated: 1925

Architecture
- Functional status: Active
- Architect: Lars Norevik
- Architectural type: Long church
- Style: Dragestil
- Completed: 1925 (101 years ago)

Specifications
- Capacity: 292
- Materials: Wood

Administration
- Diocese: Bjørgvin bispedømme
- Deanery: Sunnfjord prosti
- Parish: Bjordal og Ortnevik
- Norwegian Cultural Heritage Site
- Type: Church
- Status: Listed
- ID: 85239

Ortnevik Church (Norwegian: Ortnevik kyrkje) is a parish church of the Church of Norway in Høyanger Municipality in Vestland county, Norway. It is located in the village of Ortnevik on the south shore of the Sognefjorden. It is one of the two churches for the Bjordal og Ortnevik parish which is part of the Sunnfjord prosti (deanery) in the Diocese of Bjørgvin. The red, wooden church was built in a long church design and a dragestil style in 1925 using plans drawn up by the architect Lars Norevik, who lived in the village. The church seats about 292 people.

== History ==
For hundreds of years, the parishioners living in Ortnevik had to boat about 14 kilometres (8.7 mi) across the Sognefjorden to get to their parish church: Kyrkjebø Church. In the early 1920s, permission was given to build an annex chapel in Ortnevik for the people living in the southeast part of the municipality. The chapel was designed by Lars Norevik and the lead builder was Emil Geithus. Construction on the new chapel began during the summer of 1924. During the construction of the tower, a storm blew through the village one night and the partially constructed tower was blown off the church. It ended up in the field on the south side of the church and stood vertically in the ground as if it was planted there. Other damage to the building from the storm meant that the completion of the church was pushed back several months. The chapel was finally completed and consecrated in 1925. The new chapel was a large building, seating nearly 300 people, far more than the residents of the village. At the time of its construction, planners thought that the area would be prime for population growth, although the opposite came true. It had the status of an annex chapel until 1 January 1997 when it was upgraded to a parish church. At the same time the new parish of Bjordal og Ortnevik was created with Ortnevik Church and Bjordal Church being the two parish churches. This meant that all the people in Høyanger on the south side of the fjord now had their own parish.

== See also ==
- List of churches in Bjørgvin
