= Plassen Church =

Church in Innlandet, Norway

- Plassen kirke
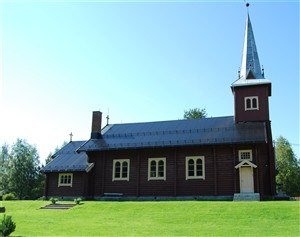
- View of the church
- Plassen Church
- 61°08′03″N 12°30′25″E
- Location: Trysil Municipality, Innlandet
- Country: Norway
- Denomination: Church of Norway
- Churchmanship: Evangelical Lutheran

History
- Status: Parish church
- Founded: 1879
- Consecrated: 17 July 1907

Architecture
- Functional status: Active
- Architect: Victor Nordan
- Architectural type: Long church
- Completed: 1907 (119 years ago)

Specifications
- Capacity: 250
- Materials: Wood

Administration
- Diocese: Hamar bispedømme
- Deanery: Sør-Østerdal prosti
- Parish: Søre Trysil
- Norwegian Cultural Heritage Site
- Type: Church
- Status: Not protected
- ID: 85261

Plassen Church (Norwegian: Plassen kirke) is a parish church of the Church of Norway in the village of Plassen, Trysil Municipality in Innlandet county, Norway. It is the church for the Søre Trysil parish which is part of the Sør-Østerdal prosti (deanery) in the Diocese of Hamar. The brown, wooden church was built in a long church design in 1907 using plans drawn up by the architect Victor Nordan. The church seats about 250 people.

== History ==
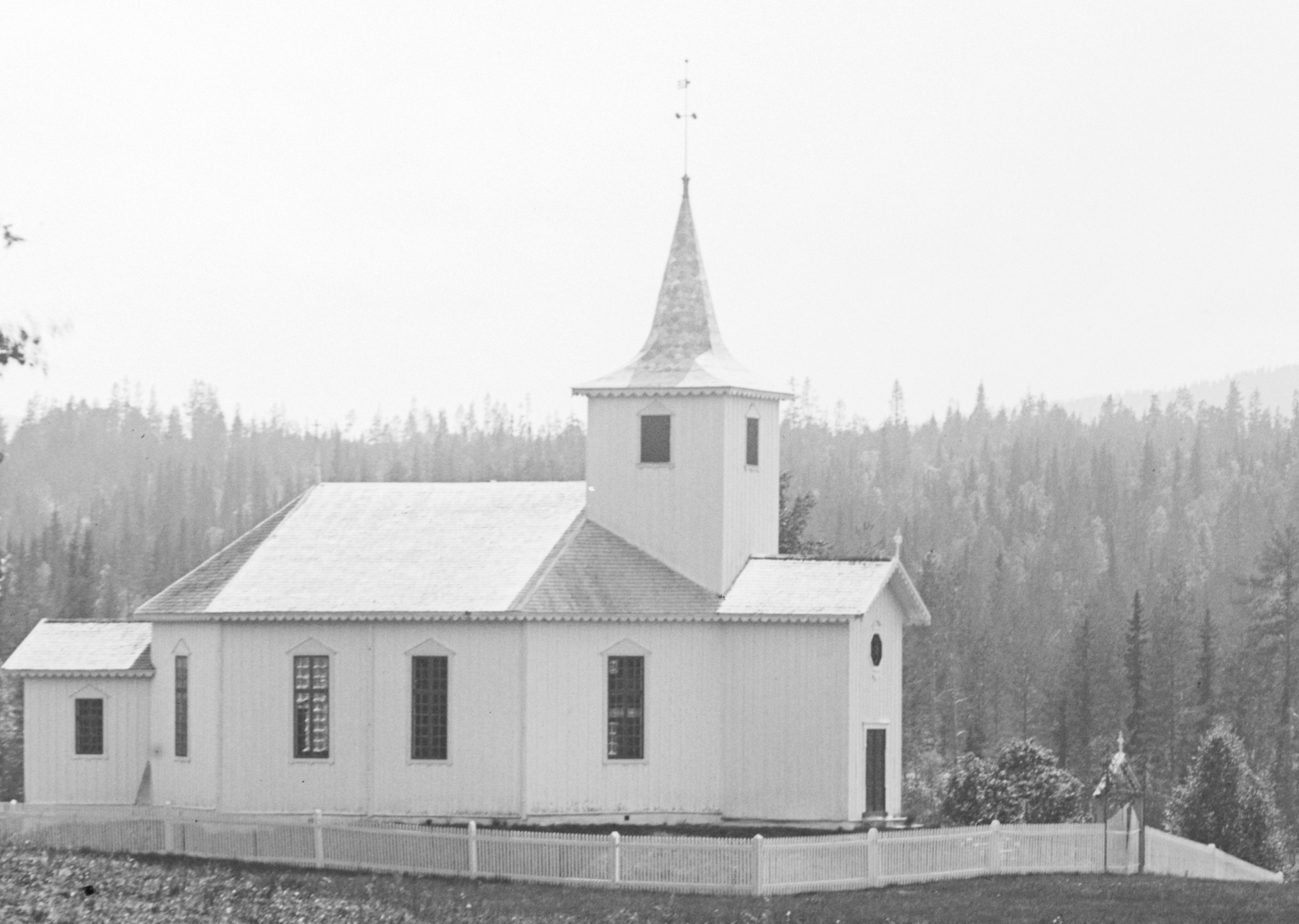
View of the old church (1879-1904).

The first church in Plassen was built in 1879. It was consecrated by the Bishop Halvor Olsen Folkestad on 27 August 1879. This was an octagonal church in lathed timber, externally clad with white painted panels. This church had 240 seats and was designed by the architect Jacob Wilhelm Nordan (1824–1892).

On 2 July 1904, this church was struck by lightning and the church burned to the ground within a few hours. The next day there was to be a service in the church, and when the parish priest Opsand and his wife and guests arrived at the church, they were surprised when they saw the fire-ravaged church. The priest and the congregation gathered on the church hill, and the parish priest gave an outdoor sermon that was long remembered by those present. Some of the church's contents were saved: the church's silver vessels, the altar table, the baptismal font, and several other items. These were stored on the neighboring farm Grønnæs during the reconstruction. The church bells were badly damaged, the largest was completely destroyed, the smallest was intact, but damaged. One of the fire-ravaged church bells was saved.

Plans were quickly set in motion and clear the rubble and build a new church on the same site. The new church was designed by the architect Victor Nordan (1862–1933), the son of Jacob Wilhelm Nordan who had designed the first church. The foundation wall was built in 1905, and then the work carried on during 1906 before it was completed in 1907. In total, the church cost 17,000 kr. The new dragestil long church is built of wood and has 250 seats. The new building was consecrated on 17 July 1907 by Bishop Christen Brun. The bell from the old church that was saved was kept and it now stands at the entrance to the new church to remind people of what happened in 1904.

== See also ==
- List of churches in Hamar
