= Victor Nordan =

Norwegian architect

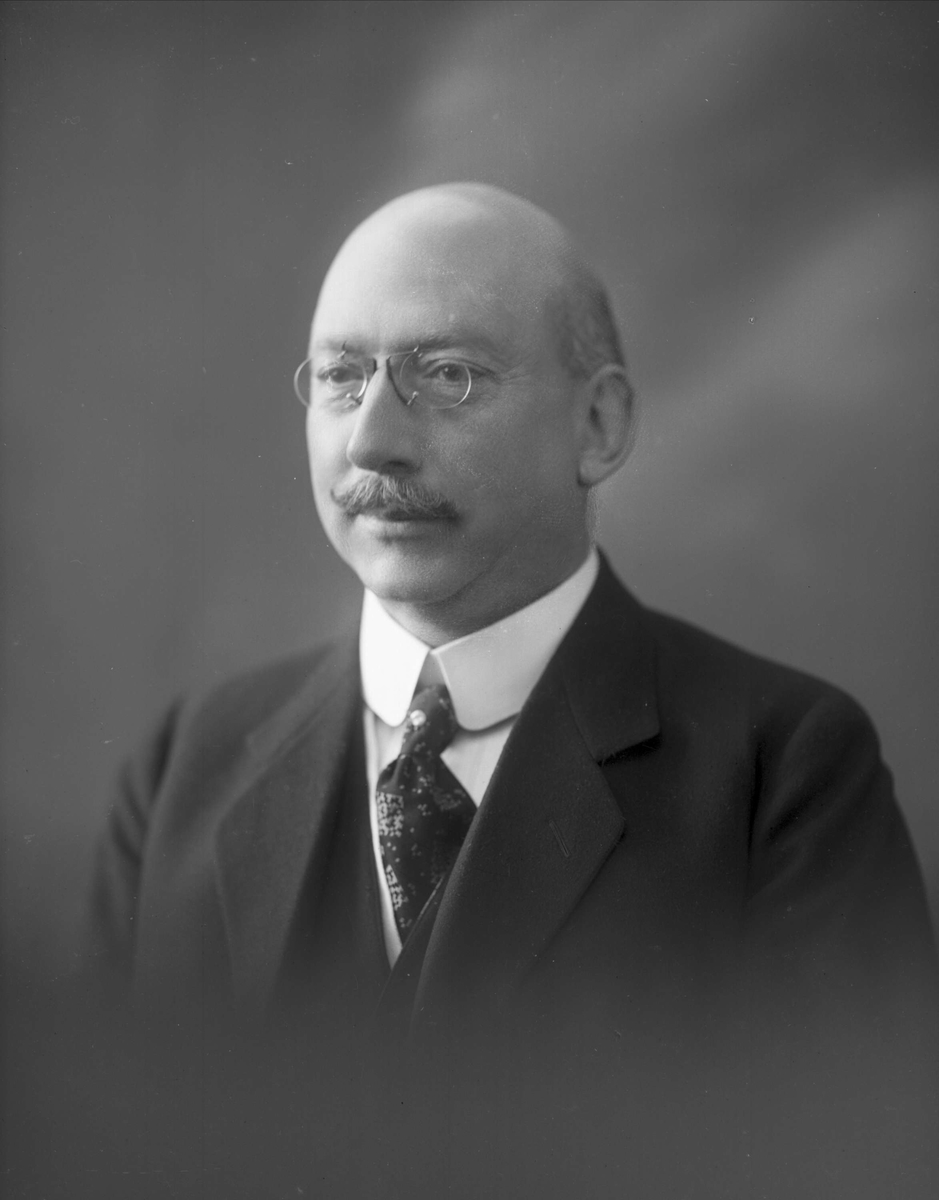
- Portrait from 1915
- Born: 13 May 1862; Christiania, Norway
- Died: 8 May 1933 (aged 70); Oslo, Norway
- Occupation: Architect
- Spouse: Emilie Marie Kjos-Hanssen
- Children: Per Nordan
- Parent(s): Jacob Wilhelm Nordan; Henriette Dorothea Henius Nordan

Victor Nordan (born 13 May 1862 in Christiania, Norway; died 8 May 1933 in Oslo, Norway) was a Norwegian architect, known for his many hospital buildings and also for designing nine churches.

Nordan was the son of architect Jacob Wilhelm Nordan. He served as his father's assistant from 1881 to 1884. He then received his education at the South Kensington Museum (Victoria and Albert Museum) from 1884 to 1885. During these years in London he worked as an assistant at an architectural firm there. From 1886 to 1887 he studied at the Königlich Technische Hochschule in Berlin. When Nordan returned to Kristiania, he worked with his father until his death in 1892. After that, he took over the business. He focused his work as a hospital architect, and it was in this area that his business became most significant. The hospital buildings from the time around the turn of the century are characterized by Art Nouveau style with simple facades where most of the articulation is done in yellow and red brick. The later hospital buildings are influenced by neoclassicism and Nordic neo-baroque. In 1926, his son Per Nordan joined his business where he worked until Victor's death in 1933.

== Works ==
- Grymyr Church (1899)
- Heskestad Church (1904)
- Evenstad Church (1904)
- Dikemark Hospital (1905)
- Bjordal Church (1906)
- Plassen Church (1907)
- Holøydal Church (1908)
- Kroken Church (1910)
- Haukeland University Hospital in Bergen (1911)
- Hæstad Church (1913)
- Oslo University Hospital, Rikshospitalet women's clinic (1914)
- Stavanger University Hospital (1916)
- Lykling Church (1916)
- Elverum Hospital (c. 1920)
- Ullevål Hospital in Oslo (1926)
