= Fiksdal =

Village in Vestnes Municipality, Norway

Fiksdalen Fiksdal
- Village
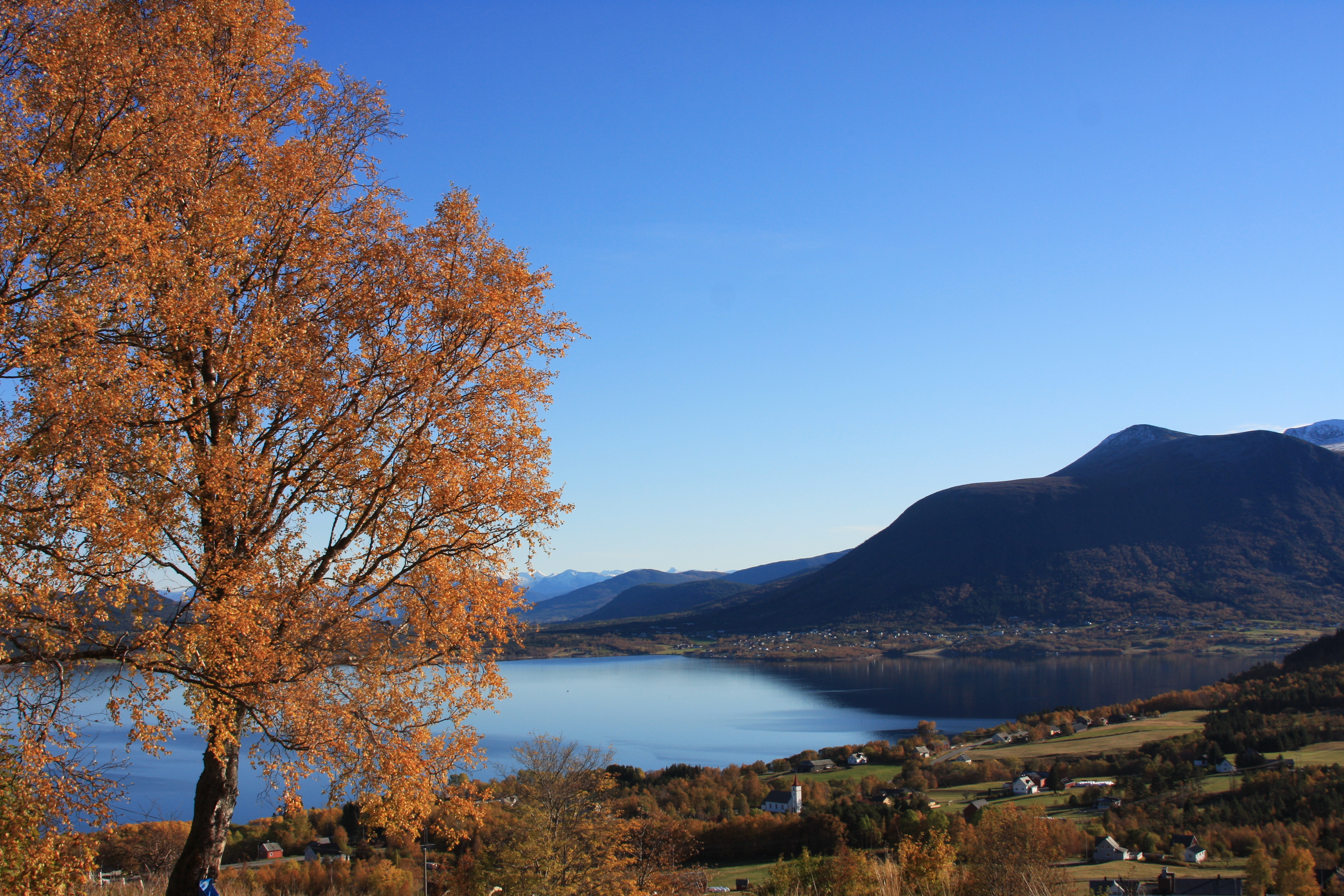
- view of Fiksdal village
- Interactive map of Fiksdalen
- Location within Møre og Romsdal Location within Norway
- Coordinates: 62.6192°N 6.8535°E
- Country: Norway
- Region: Western Norway
- County: Møre og Romsdal
- District: Romsdal
- Municipality: Vestnes Municipality

Area
  - Total: 0.31 km^{2} (0.12 sq mi)
- Elevation: 42 m (138 ft)

Population (2024)
  - Total: 225
  - Density: 726/km^{2} (1,880/sq mi)
- Time zone: UTC+01:00 (CET)
  - Summer (DST): UTC+02:00 (CEST)
- Post Code: 6394 Fiksdal

Fiksdal or Fiksdalen is a village in Vestnes Municipality in Møre og Romsdal county, Norway. The village is located on the west side of the Tomrefjorden, about 8 kilometres (5.0 mi) northwest of the village of Tomra. Fiksdal Church is located in this village. Fiksdal is also the hometown of Norwegian international footballer Kjetil Rekdal.

The 0.31-square-kilometre (77-acre) village has a population (2024) of 225 and a population density of 726 inhabitants per square kilometre (1,880/sq mi).

== Media gallery ==
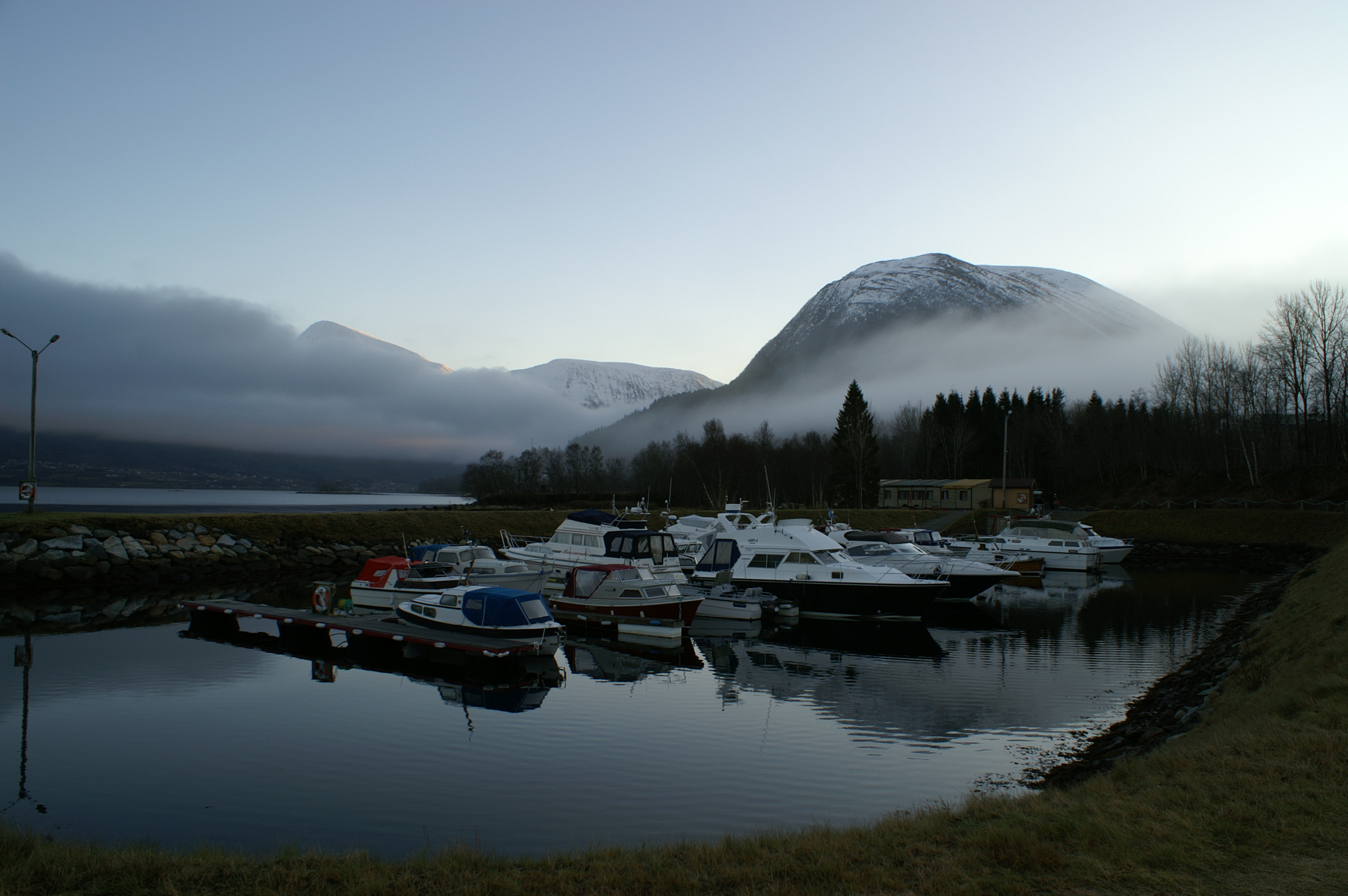
View of the local harbor

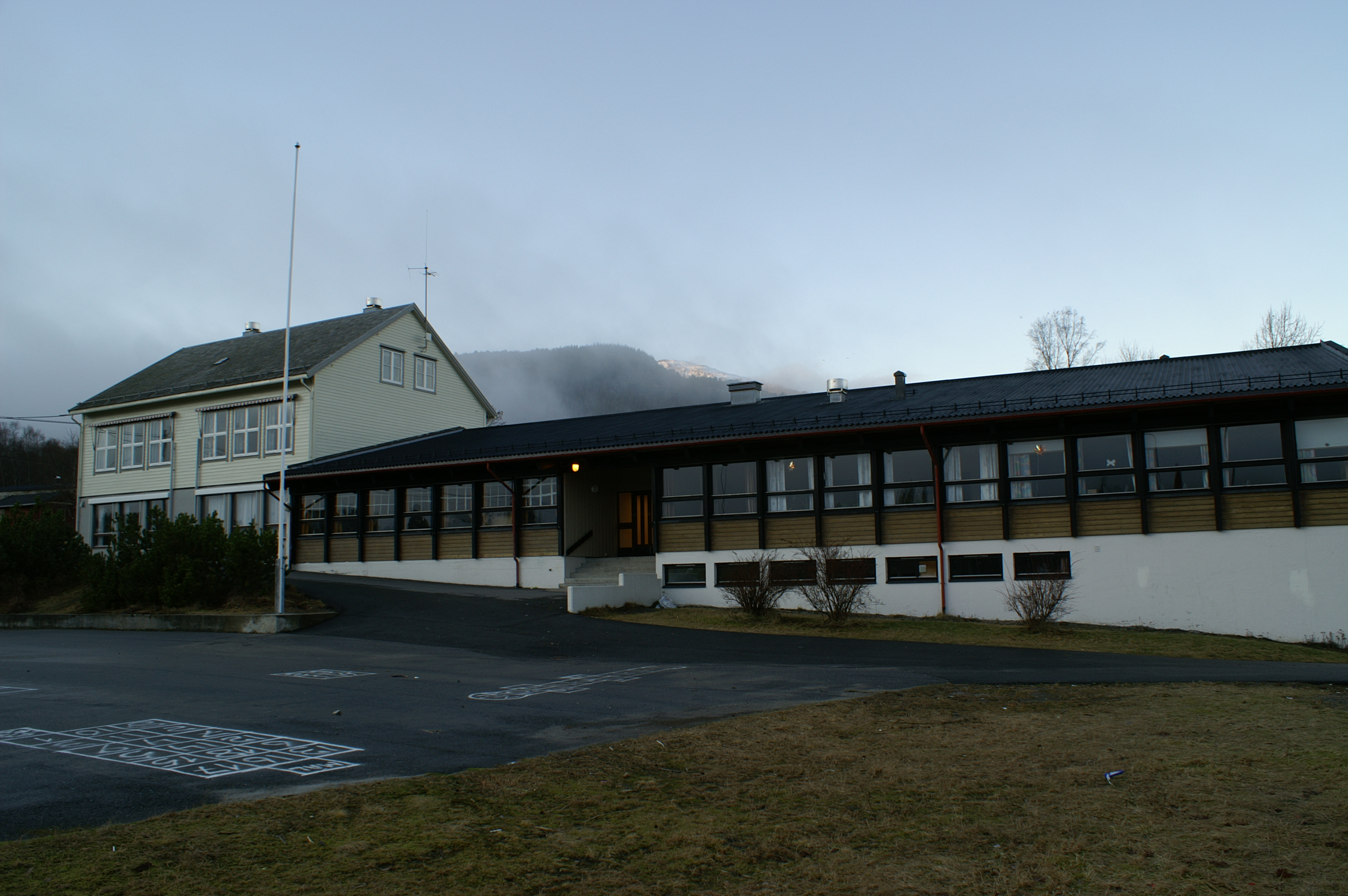
The primary public school in the village
