= Vågstranda Church =

Church in Møre og Romsdal, Norway

- Vågstranda kyrkje
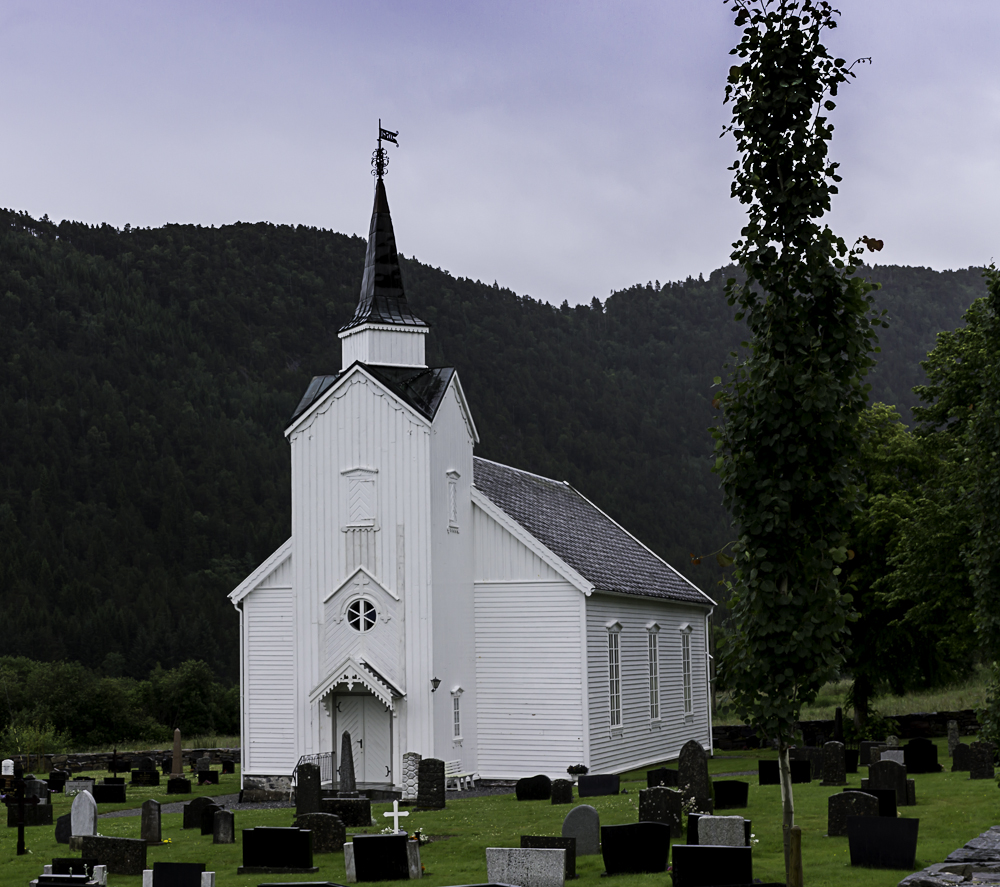
- View of the church
- Vågstranda Church
- 62°36′21″N 7°19′19″E
- Location: Vestnes Municipality, Møre og Romsdal
- Country: Norway
- Denomination: Church of Norway
- Churchmanship: Evangelical Lutheran

History
- Status: Parish church
- Founded: 1869
- Consecrated: 1869

Architecture
- Functional status: Active
- Architect: Jacob Wilhelm Nordan
- Architectural type: Long church
- Completed: 1869 (157 years ago)

Specifications
- Capacity: 200
- Materials: Wood

Administration
- Diocese: Møre bispedømme
- Deanery: Indre Romsdal prosti
- Parish: Vågstranda
- Norwegian Cultural Heritage Site
- Type: Church
- Status: Not protected
- ID: 85880

Vågstranda Church (Norwegian: Vågstranda kyrkje) is a parish church of the Church of Norway in Vestnes Municipality in Møre og Romsdal county, Norway. It is located in the village of Vågstranda on the coast of Romsdal Fjord. It is the church for the Vågstranda parish which is part of the Indre Romsdal prosti (deanery) in the Diocese of Møre. The white, wooden church was built in a long church style in 1869 using plans drawn up by the architect Jacob Wilhelm Nordan and the builder G. Olsen. The church seats about 200 people.

== History ==
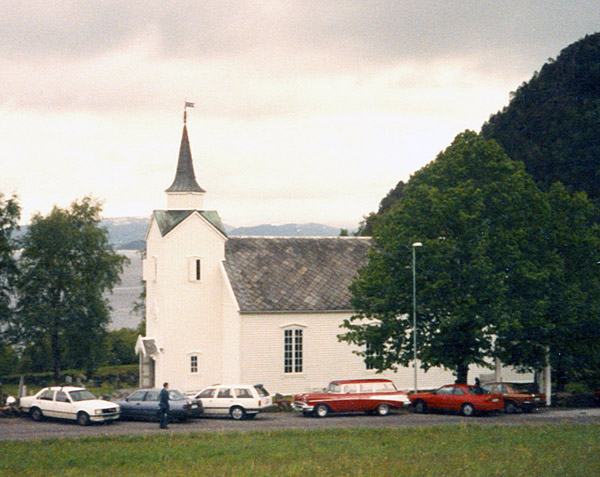
View of the church (c. 1985)

The church was originally established in 1870 to give the people of the Vågstranda area a church that they could attend that was closer than the Old Veøy Church which sat on an island in the Romsdal Fjord. At that time, there were about 450 people living in the Vågstranda area who would be able to use the church. To raise money for the new church, 39 families joined together to pool their money to fund the costs of the church. All farm owners in the parish volunteered together to construct the walls surrounding the cemetery. The building was built by the carpenter G. Olsen from Trondheim who used architectural plans drawn up by Jacob Wilhelm Nordan. The church was a sort of manufactured building that was actually constructed in Trondheim, then disassembled, shipped to Vågstranda, and then rebuilt on site.

In 1881, a large winter storm hit the church and it actually moved the church about 2 metres (6 ft 7 in) off its foundation. That following spring, the church was repaired. The building received electricity in 1951, and in 1958 the church got new wood stoves for heat. The church was restored in 1971 for the centennial anniversary of the church. During this renovation, a sacristy was built, the exterior walls were insulated and clad with new siding, and new lighting was installed. On 1 January 2021, the Vågstranda area was administratively transferred from Rauma Municipality to Vestnes Municipality.

== See also ==
- List of churches in Møre
