= Vik, Vestnes =

Village in Vestnes Municipality, Norway

Vik
- Village
- Interactive map of Vik
- Location within Møre og Romsdal Location within Norway
- Coordinates: 62.6099°N 6.9408°E
- Country: Norway
- Region: Western Norway
- County: Møre og Romsdal
- District: Romsdal
- Municipality: Vestnes Municipality
- Elevation: 47 m (154 ft)
- Time zone: UTC+01:00 (CET)
  - Summer (DST): UTC+02:00 (CEST)
- Post Code: 6393 Tomrefjord

Vik is a village in Vestnes Municipality in Møre og Romsdal county, Norway. It is located along the Tomrefjorden, just north of the village of Tomrefjord and about 8 kilometres (5.0 mi) west-southwest of the village of Vestnes. Vik and Tomrefjord villages have grown together over the years due to conurbation.

Vik has a marching band club and the community center Idahall which is also the site of the local football field. Down by the shore there is a beach known as "Vikstranda" (literally meaning Vik beach), and a small-boat marina. During the late 1990s to early 2010s there also used to be a fast-food restaurant in the village. North of the Vik village there is a light industrial area known as Trohaugen which is the location of many local businesses and companies.
