= Evenstad Church =

Church in Innlandet, Norway

- Evenstad kirke
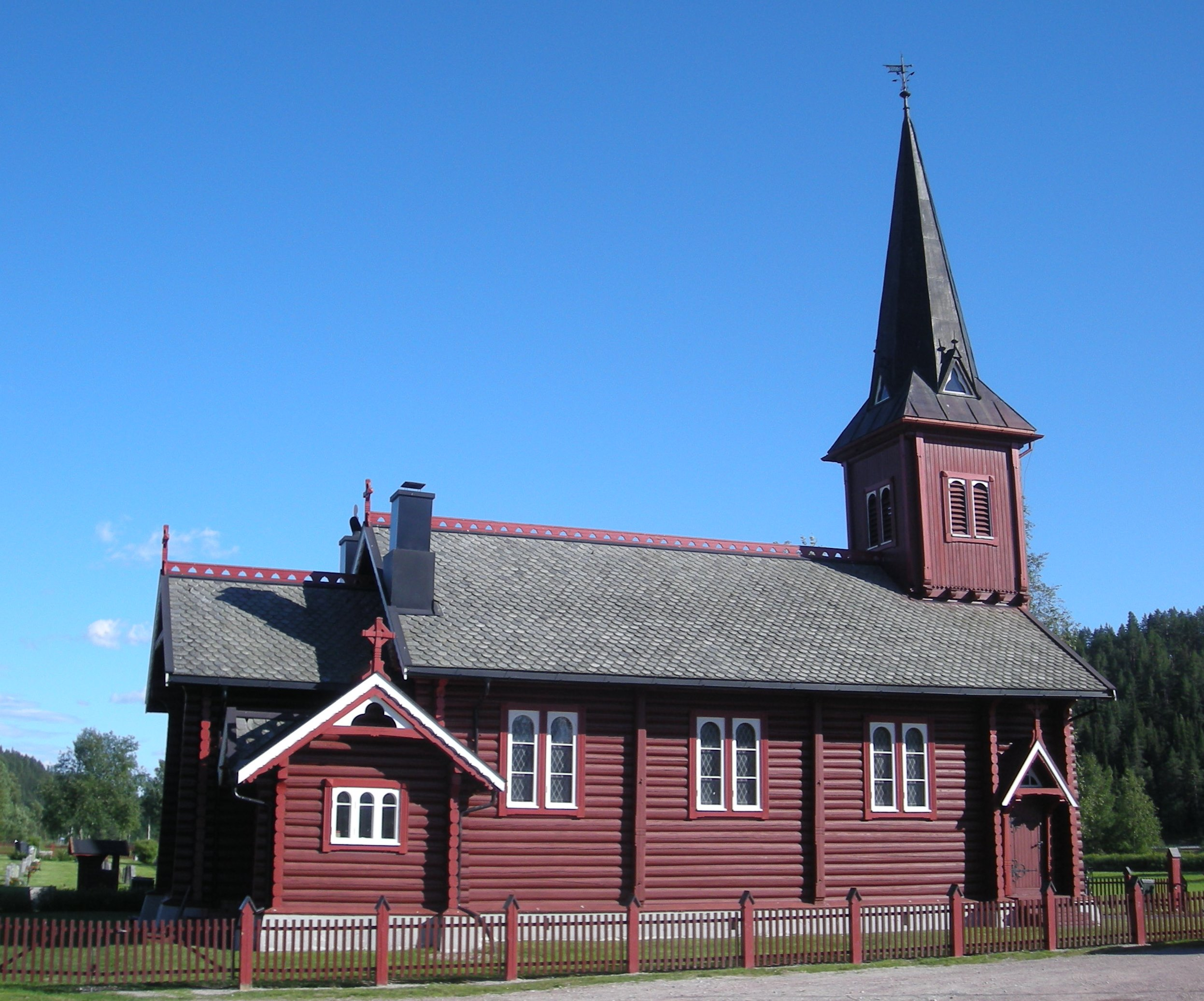
- View of the church
- Evenstad Church
- 61°24′21″N 11°08′00″E
- Location: Stor-Elvdal, Innlandet
- Country: Norway
- Denomination: Church of Norway
- Churchmanship: Evangelical Lutheran

History
- Status: Parish church
- Founded: 1904
- Consecrated: 22 July 1904

Architecture
- Functional status: Active
- Architect: Victor Nordan
- Architectural type: Long church
- Completed: 1904 (122 years ago)

Specifications
- Capacity: 120
- Materials: Wood

Administration
- Diocese: Hamar bispedømme
- Deanery: Sør-Østerdal prosti
- Parish: Stor-Elvdal
- Norwegian Cultural Heritage Site
- Type: Church
- Status: Protected
- ID: 84107

Evenstad Church (Norwegian: Evenstad kirke) is a parish church of the Church of Norway in Stor-Elvdal Municipality in Innlandet county, Norway. It is located in the village of Evenstad. It is one of the churches for the Stor-Elvdal parish which is part of the Sør-Østerdal prosti (deanery) in the Diocese of Hamar. The brown, wooden church was built in a long church design in 1904 using plans drawn up by the architect Victor Nordan. The church seats about 120 people.

== History ==
Evenstad chapel (later upgraded to a church status) was built because of the work of Anne Evenstad, who also financed the construction. Simen Rusten provided land for the chapel and burial ground. The church is located between the villages of Evenstad and Rasta, and it is said that the location near Rasta station was chosen to make it easier for the priest and organist, who often came to the place by train. The building was designed by Victor Nordan and the lead builder was Martin O. Bråten from Åsnes Municipality. The new building was consecrated on 22 July 1904. The cemetery at the church was formally opened in 1907 and is located mainly on the south side of the church.

== Media gallery ==
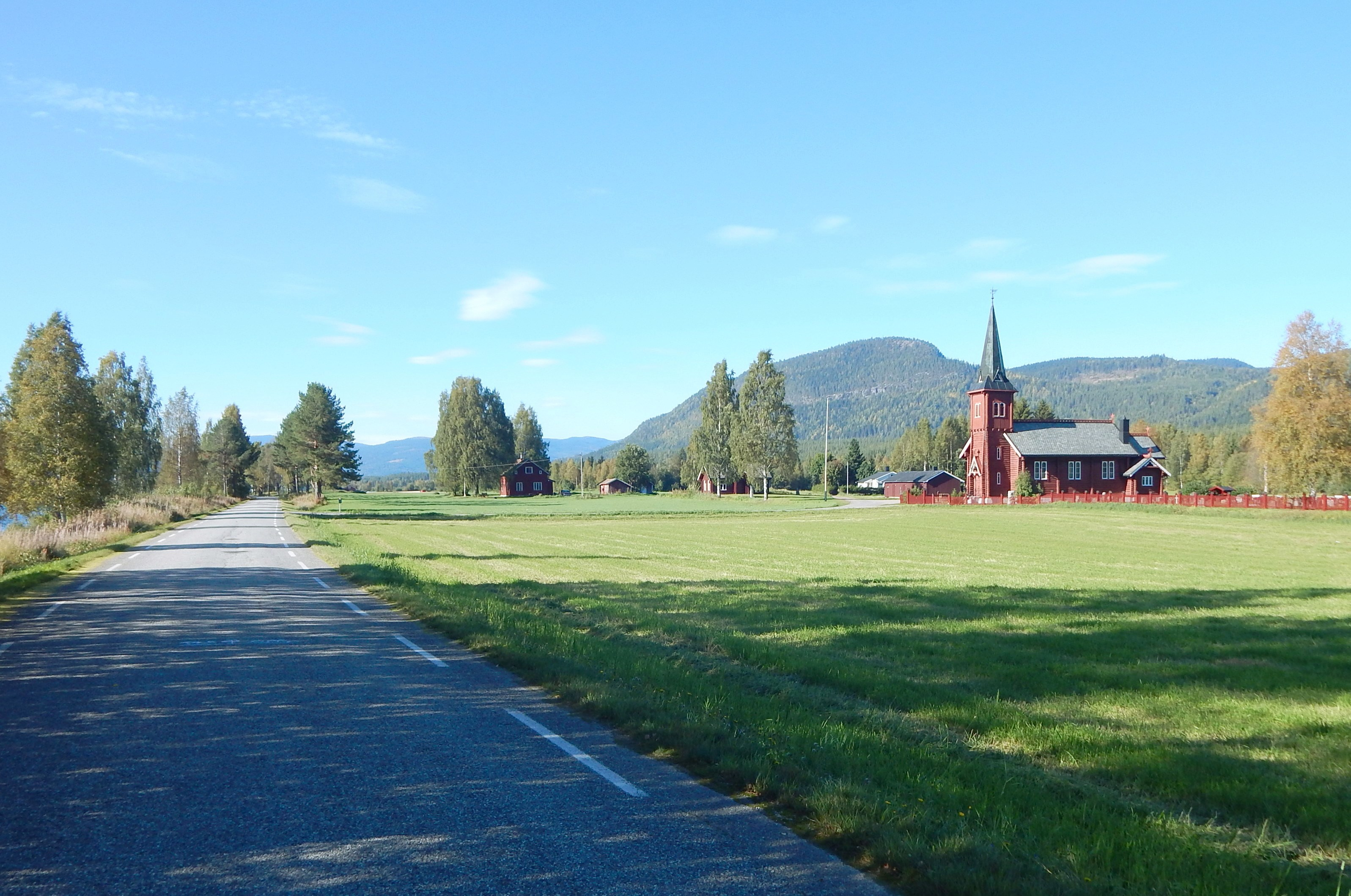

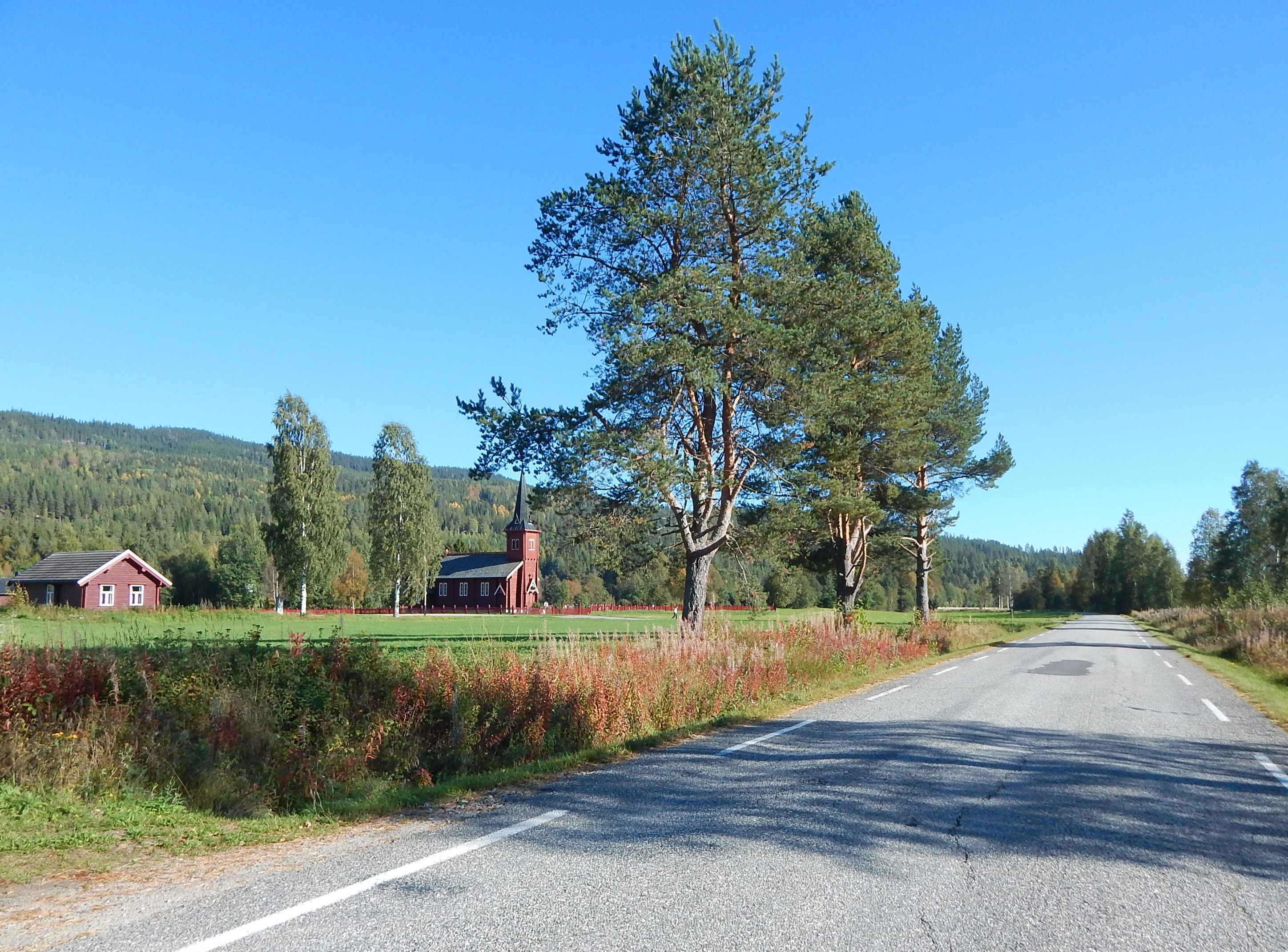

== See also ==
- List of churches in Hamar
