= Tomrefjorden =

Fjord in Vestnes, Norway

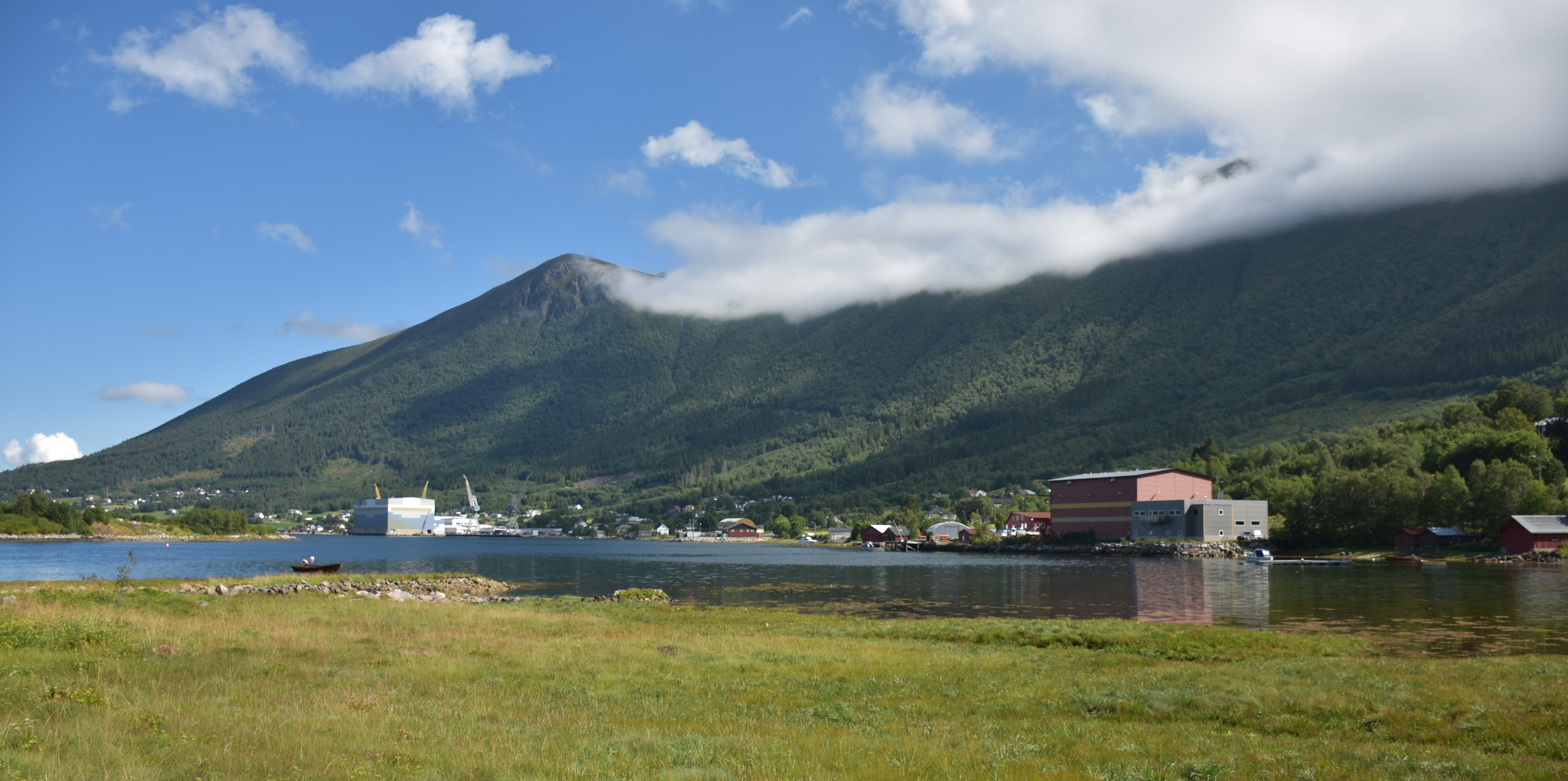
- View of the head of the fjord
- Interactive map of the fjord
- Location: Møre og Romsdal, Norway
- Coordinates: 62.6235°N 6.9017°E
- Type: Fjord
- Primary outflows: Romsdalsfjorden
- Basin countries: Norway
- Max. length: 9 kilometres (5.6 mi)
- Max. width: 4 kilometres (2.5 mi)
- Settlements: Fiksdal, Vik, Tomrefjord

Tomrefjorden is a fjord in Vestnes Municipality in Møre og Romsdal county, Norway. At 9 kilometres (5.6 mi) long, it branches off of the main Romsdalsfjorden and is one of two big fjords that cut into the municipality. It is located about 8 kilometres (5.0 mi) west of the village of Vestnes.

The Norwegian County Road 661 follows the shoreline around most of the fjord. The road passes through three larger coastal villages: Fiksdal on the western shore, Tomrefjord on the southern shore, and Vik on the eastern shore.

== See also ==
- List of Norwegian Fjords
