= Tomrefjord =

Village in Vestnes Municipality, Norway

Tomrefjord Tomra (historic)
- Village
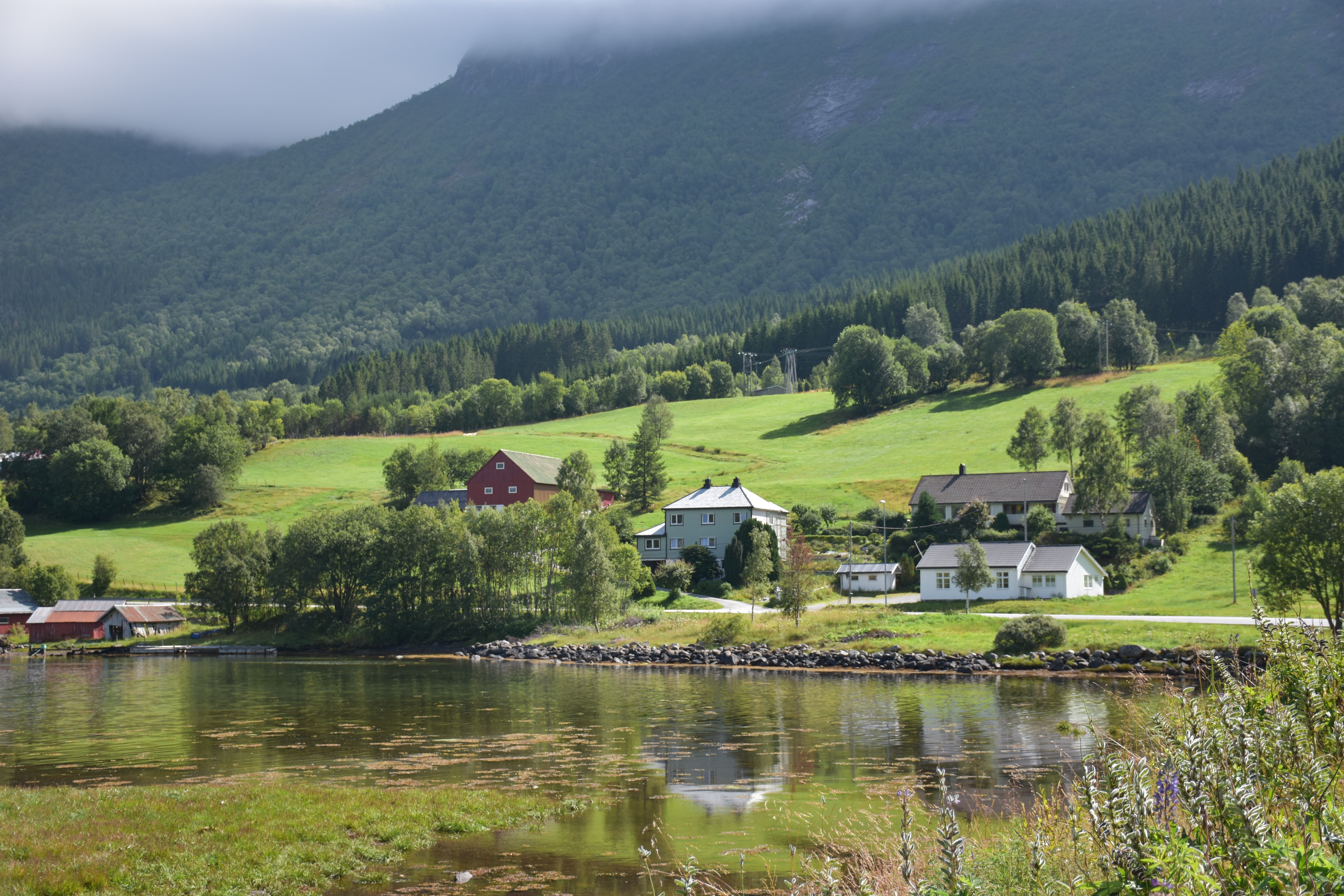
- Interactive map of Tomrefjord
- Location within Møre og Romsdal Location within Norway
- Coordinates: 62.5812°N 6.9311°E
- Country: Norway
- Region: Western Norway
- County: Møre og Romsdal
- District: Romsdal
- Municipality: Vestnes Municipality

Area
  - Total: 1.53 km^{2} (0.59 sq mi)
- Elevation: 19 m (62 ft)

Population (2024)
  - Total: 1,117
  - Density: 730/km^{2} (1,900/sq mi)
- Time zone: UTC+01:00 (CET)
  - Summer (DST): UTC+02:00 (CEST)
- Post Code: 6393 Tomrefjord

Tomrefjord is a village located in Vestnes Municipality in Møre og Romsdal county, Norway. It is located just south of the village of Vik at the end of the Tomrefjorden. The village of Fiksdalen lies 8 kilometres (5.0 mi) to the northwest.

The 1.53-square-kilometre (380-acre) village has a population (2024) of 1,117 and a population density of 730 inhabitants per square kilometre (1,900/sq mi).

The VARD Langsten shipyard is located in Tomrefjord.

== Notable people ==
- Bjørn Rune Gjelsten, a businessman from Tomrefjord
- Kjetil Rekdal, a footballer who went to school in Tomrefjord
