= Grymyr Church =

Church in Innlandet, Norway

- Grymyr kirke
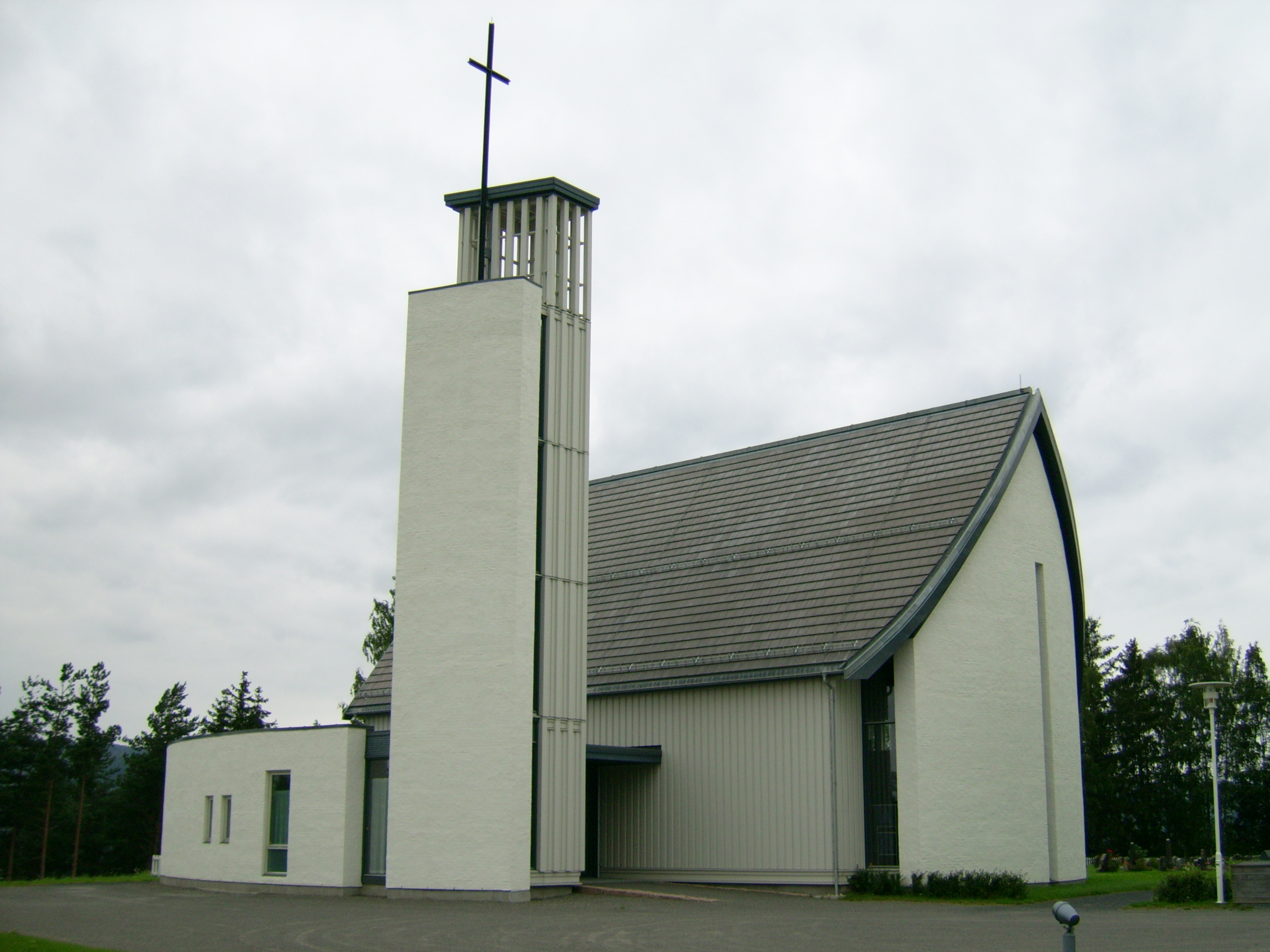
- View of the church
- Grymyr Church
- 60°20′25″N 10°24′15″E
- Location: Gran Municipality, Innlandet
- Country: Norway
- Denomination: Church of Norway
- Churchmanship: Evangelical Lutheran

History
- Status: Parish church
- Founded: 1899
- Consecrated: 24 August 2003

Architecture
- Functional status: Active
- Architect: Trude Often Sveen
- Architectural type: Rectangular
- Completed: 2003 (23 years ago)

Specifications
- Capacity: 250
- Materials: Concrete

Administration
- Diocese: Hamar bispedømme
- Deanery: Hadeland og Land prosti
- Parish: Gran/Tingelstad
- Norwegian Cultural Heritage Site
- Type: Church
- Status: Not protected
- ID: 84439

Grymyr Church (Norwegian: Grymyr kirke) is a parish church of the Church of Norway in Gran Municipality in Innlandet county, Norway. It is located in the village of Grymyr. It is one of the churches for the Gran/Tingelstad parish which is part of the Hadeland og Land prosti (deanery) in the Diocese of Hamar. The white, concrete church was built in a rectangular design in 2003 using plans drawn up by the architect Trude Often Sveen. The church seats about 250 people.

== History ==
The first church in Grymyr was a wooden long church that was built in 1899. The church was designed by Victor Nordan. The church was designed in the Swiss chalet style and it was a log building. In 1930, the exterior received wooden paneled siding. On 15 October 1999, the church caught fire and burned down. In January 2000, a building committee was appointed to plan for a new church. A public meeting and exhibition were held, and eventually the proposal from the architectural firm Madsø-Lund-Sveen was chosen. The main architect from the firm was Trude Often Sveen. The foundation stone was laid on 28 October 2002. The nave is almost square during regular services, while the walls between the nave and the church hall can be opened for larger events so you can get a larger, elongated room. There is also a side room as well as an almost free-standing bell tower. The new church was consecrated on 24 August 2003 by the Bishop Rosemarie Köhn.

== Media gallery ==
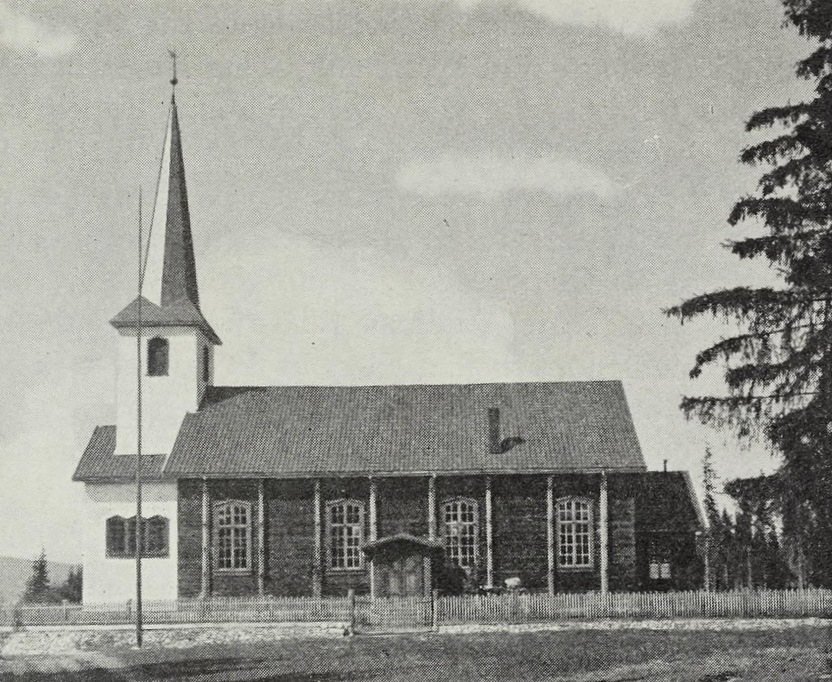
View of the old church

Video of the old church burning

== See also ==
- List of churches in Hamar
