= Kyrkjebø (village) =

Village in Høyanger Municipality, Norway

Kyrkjebø Kirkebø (historic)
- Village
- Interactive map of Kyrkjebø
- Location within Vestland Location within Norway
- Coordinates: 61.16341°N 5.90475°E
- Country: Norway
- Region: Western Norway
- County: Vestland
- District: Sogn
- Municipality: Høyanger Municipality

Area
  - Total: 0.29 km^{2} (0.11 sq mi)
- Elevation: 18 m (59 ft)

Population (2025)
  - Total: 239
  - Density: 824/km^{2} (2,130/sq mi)
- Time zone: UTC+01:00 (CET)
  - Summer (DST): UTC+02:00 (CEST)
- Post Code: 6995 Kyrkjebø

Kyrkjebø is a village in Høyanger Municipality in Vestland county, Norway. The village is located on the northern shore of the Sognefjorden, about halfway between the small Vadheimsfjorden and Høyangsfjorden arms which branch off the main fjord. The village sits about 3 kilometres (1.9 mi) to the west of the village of Austreim, about 13 kilometres (8.1 mi) to the southwest of the village of Høyanger (the municipal centre), and 11 kilometres (6.8 mi) southeast of the village of Vadheim, where the European route E39 highway passes through the municipality.

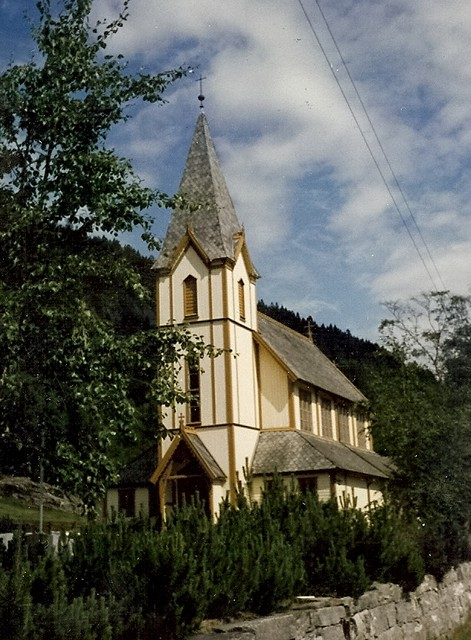
View of Kyrkjebø Church

The 0.29-square-kilometre (72-acre) village has a population (2025) of 239 and a population density of 824 inhabitants per square kilometre (2,130/sq mi).

== History ==
The village was the administrative centre of the old Kyrkjebø Municipality which existed from 1858 until its dissolution in 1964.

=== Name ===
The village is named after the old Kirkebø farm, since Kyrkjebø Church was located there. The first element of the name is identical with the name for "church", and the second element of the name is identical with the word for "farm". It was named this because it was the farm where the church was located. From 1890 until 1917 the name was spelled Kirkebø (using the Bokmål spelling) and then in 1917 it was changed to Kyrkjebø (using the Nynorsk spelling).
