= Kyrkjebø Church =

Church in Vestland, Norway

- Kyrkjebø kyrkje
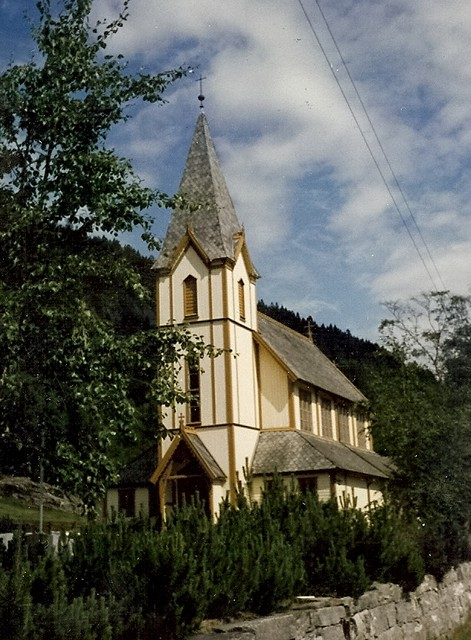
- View of the church
- Kyrkjebø Church
- 61°09′54″N 5°55′07″E
- Location: Høyanger Municipality, Vestland
- Country: Norway
- Denomination: Church of Norway
- Churchmanship: Evangelical Lutheran

History
- Former name(s): Østreim kirke Kirkebø kirke
- Status: Parish church
- Founded: 12th century
- Consecrated: 7 October 1869

Architecture
- Functional status: Active
- Architect: Christian Christie
- Architectural type: Long church
- Completed: 1869 (157 years ago)

Specifications
- Capacity: 500
- Materials: Wood

Administration
- Diocese: Bjørgvin bispedømme
- Deanery: Sunnfjord prosti
- Parish: Kyrkjebø
- Norwegian Cultural Heritage Site
- Type: Church
- Status: Listed
- ID: 84877

Kyrkjebø Church (Norwegian: Kyrkjebø kyrkje) is a parish church of the Church of Norway in Høyanger Municipality in Vestland county, Norway. It is located in the village of Kyrkjebø. It is the church for the Kyrkjebø parish which is part of the Sunnfjord prosti (deanery) in the Diocese of Bjørgvin. The wooden church was built in a long church design in 1869 using plans drawn up by the architect Christian Christie, who based his designs on the old stave churches in Norway. The church is a three-nave basilica church which seats about 500 people.

== Design ==
The Kyrkjebø Church's architecture is based on the classical lines and derives from Gothic cathedral designs. This design was as much the result of architectural choice as of the technical requirements for building churches that emerged during the 19th century. The improvement in technology and crafting techniques at the turn of the century had led to churches adopting a lighter form and employing elaborate detailing.

== History ==
The earliest existing historical records of the church date back to the year 1331, but it was not new that year. The first church here was likely a wooden stave church and it was located in the nearby village of Austreim, about 1.5 kilometres (0.93 mi) east of the present location of the church. Around the year 1590, the church was torn down and a new church was built in the village of Kyrkjebø, about 60 metres (200 ft) east of the present site of the church. The church had been known as Austreim Church (Østreim kirke), but some time after the move, it became known by its new location, Kirkebø kirke. In 1670, the church was enlarged to the north side by adding a transept to create a partial cruciform design. An inspection from 1673 stated that the main nave measured about 12 by 9.5 metres (39 ft × 31 ft) and the northern transept measured about 4 by 6.3 metres (13 ft × 21 ft). The 5.5-by-7-metre (18 ft × 23 ft) choir was located east of the nave. There was a small church porch with a tower on the west end of the nave.

In 1869, a new church building was constructed about 60 metres (200 ft) west of the old church. The building was designed by Christian Christie and the lead builder was John Alver. The church was inspired by the historic stave churches in Norway. The new church was consecrated on 7 October 1869. After the new church was completed, the old church was torn down. In 1920, a new roof was installed. In 1957, the church was renovated to better insulate the building. New wall panelling, new ceiling, and new floors were all installed. In 1966, the church was wired for electricity. In 1967, the tower was significantly repaired. In 1986–1987, a small extension on the north side was torn down and replaced with a larger one that houses a bathroom and other storage rooms.

== See also ==
- List of churches in Bjørgvin
