= Jacob Wilhelm Nordan =

Danish-Norwegian architect (1824–1892)

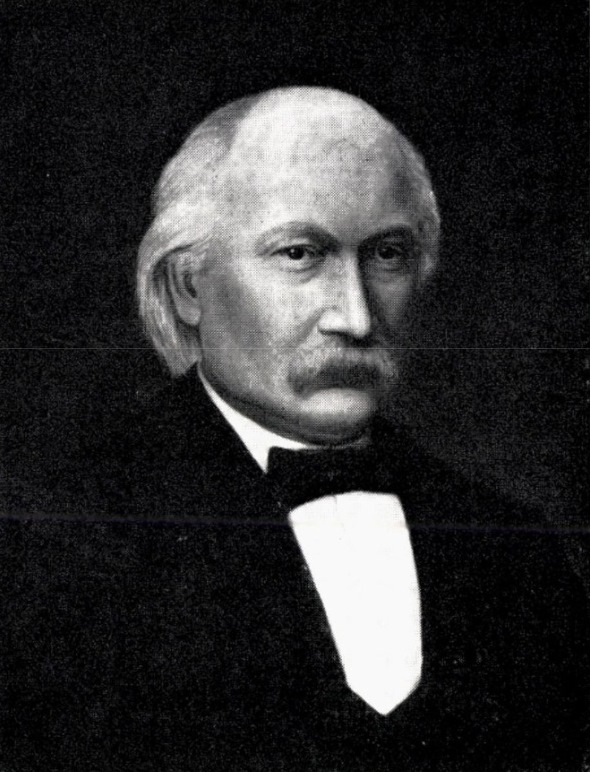
Jacob Wilhelm Nordan

Jacob Wilhelm Nordan (23 February 1824 – 11 April 1892) was a Danish-born, Norwegian architect. During his career, he was one of the most prolific church architects in Norway.

== Biography ==
Nordan was born in Copenhagen, Denmark and came to Norway as a child with his mother. He attended the Royal Drafting School (Den Kongelige Tegneskole) in Christiania (now Oslo), where Johannes Flintoe, Christian Heinrich Grosch and Johan Henrik Nebelong were among his teachers. From 1849 to 1852, Nordan worked under architect Johan Henrik Nebelong as assistant and building manager during the construction of Oscarshall. From 1852 to 1855, he studied at the Royal Danish Academy of Fine Arts in Copenhagen and received travel grants to Bavaria and Austria.

In 1856, he established architectural office in Christiania, while he also taught at the Royal Drafting School. While working for the Ministry of the Church of Norway, he designed nearly one hundred churches. Among his designs are also Fritzøehus Manor located outside Larvik, the former fire and police station in Oslo at Møllergata 19, and the bazaars on the public square at Youngstorget in downtown Oslo.

In 1860, Nordan married Danish artist Henriette Dorothea Henius (1826–1903). Their son Victor Nordan (1862–1933) was also an architect. He became his father's partner in 1887 and took over the company at his death 1892.

== Gallery ==
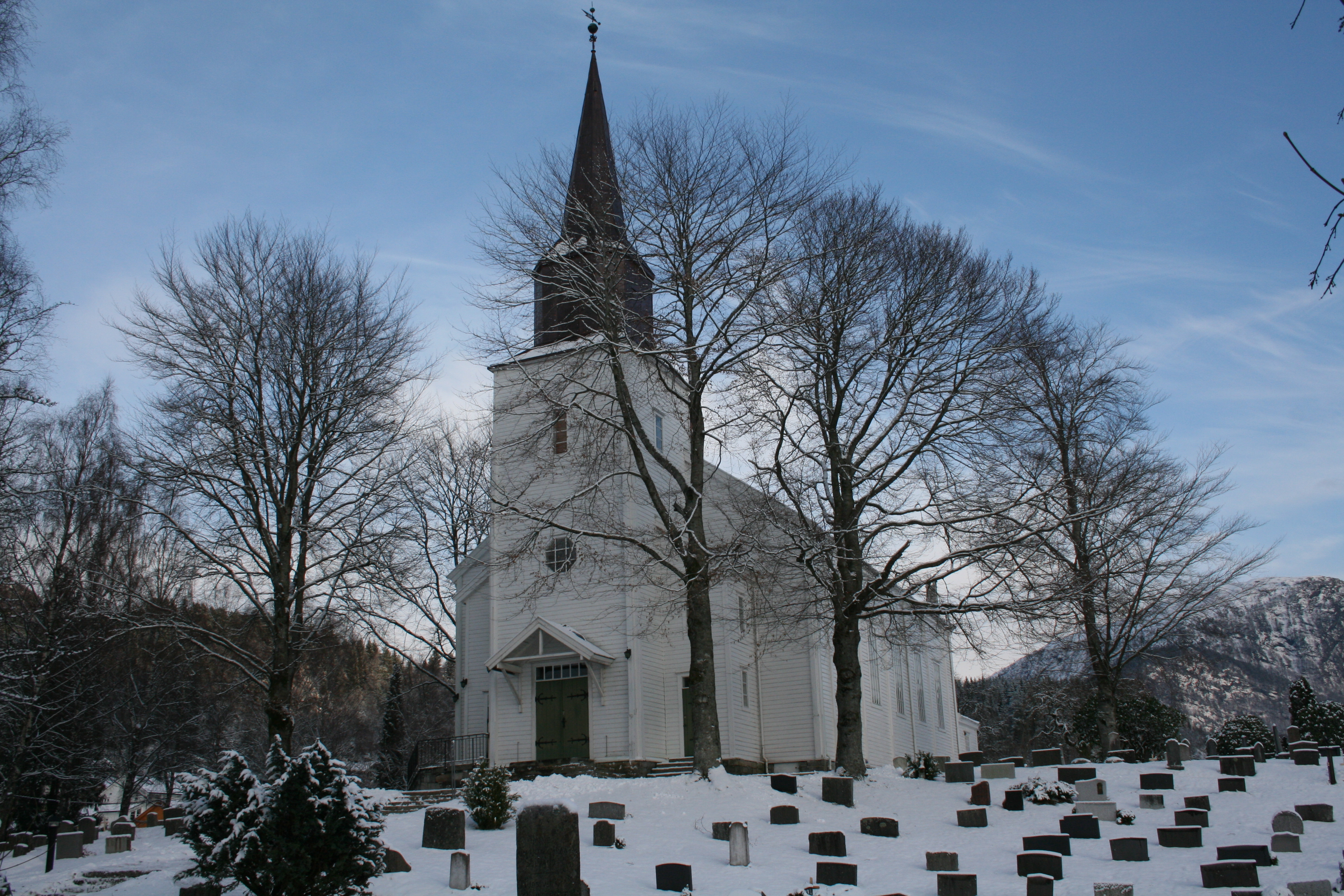
Førde Church in Sunnfjord Municipality (1885)

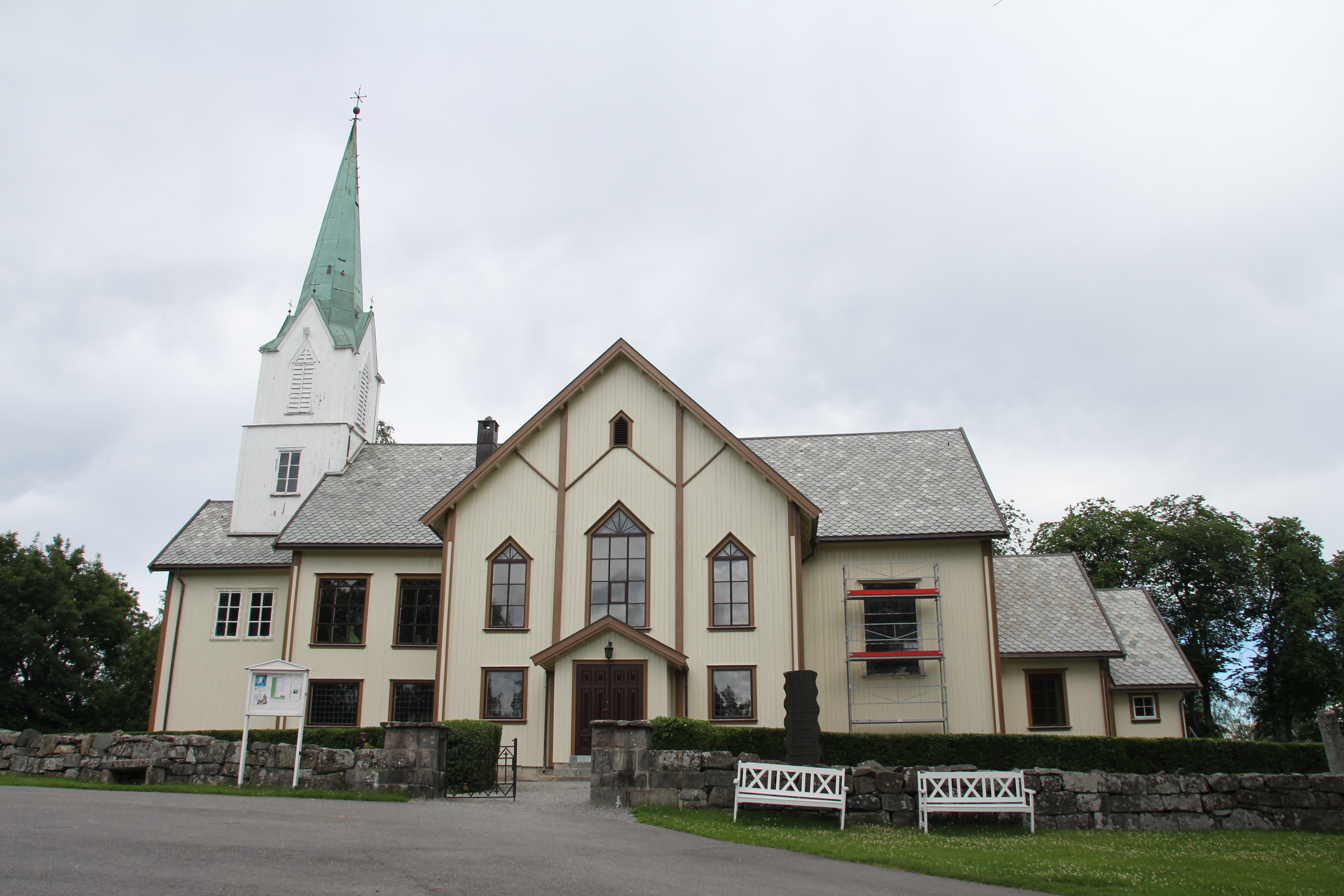
Askim Church in Østfold (1878)

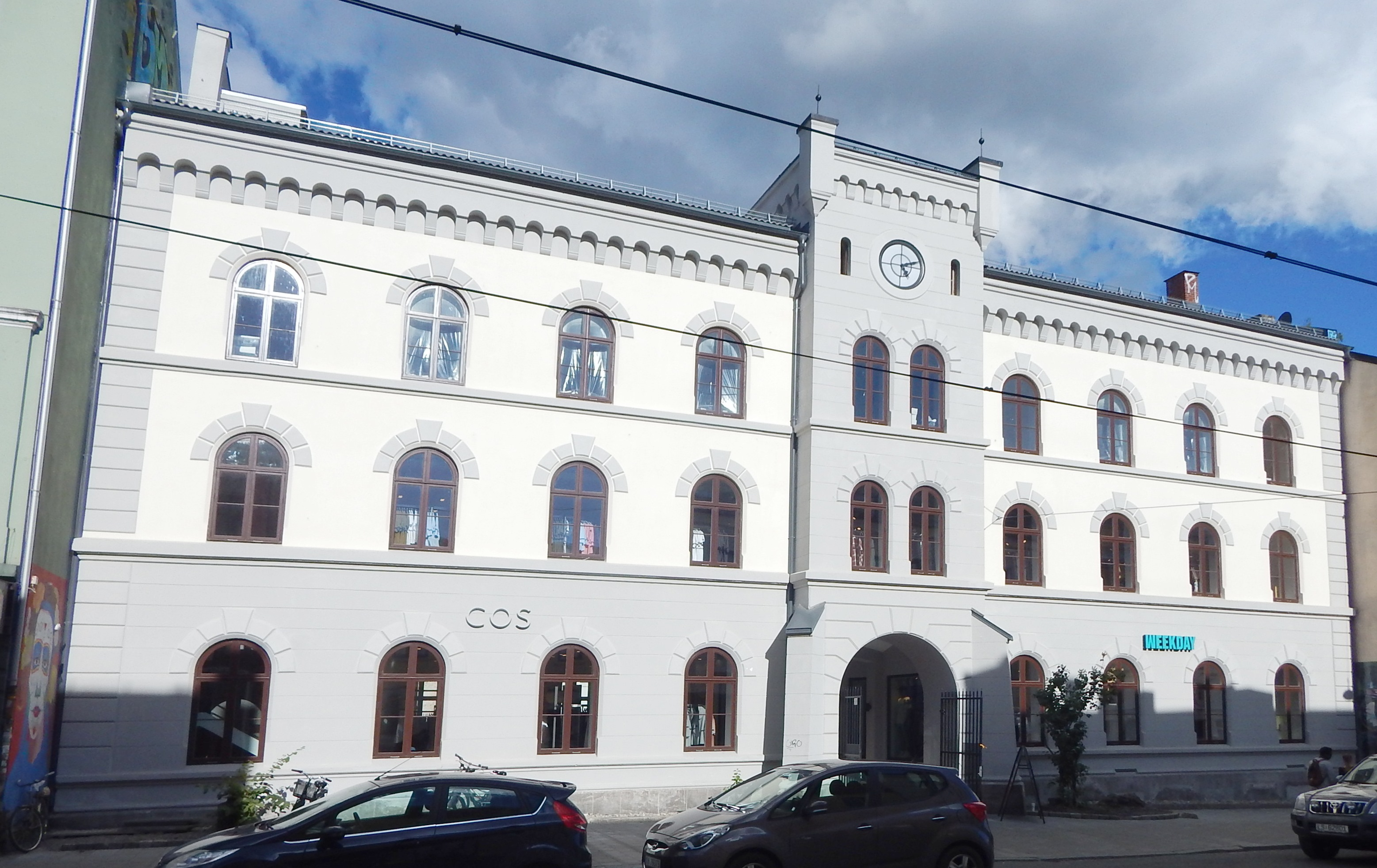
Thorvald Meyers gate 38 at Grünerløkka (1876)

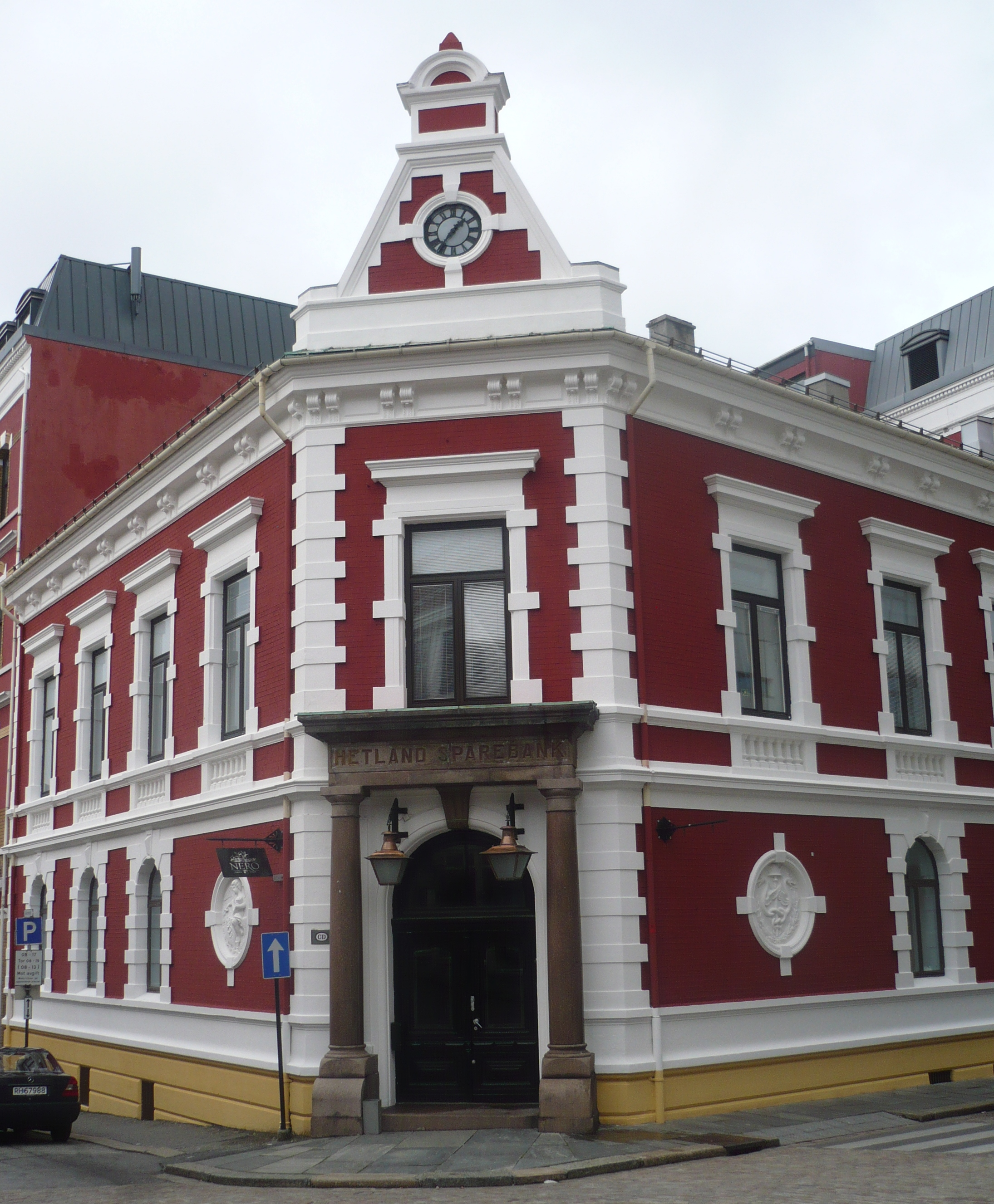
Stavanger Hetlandsbanken in Stavanger (1891)

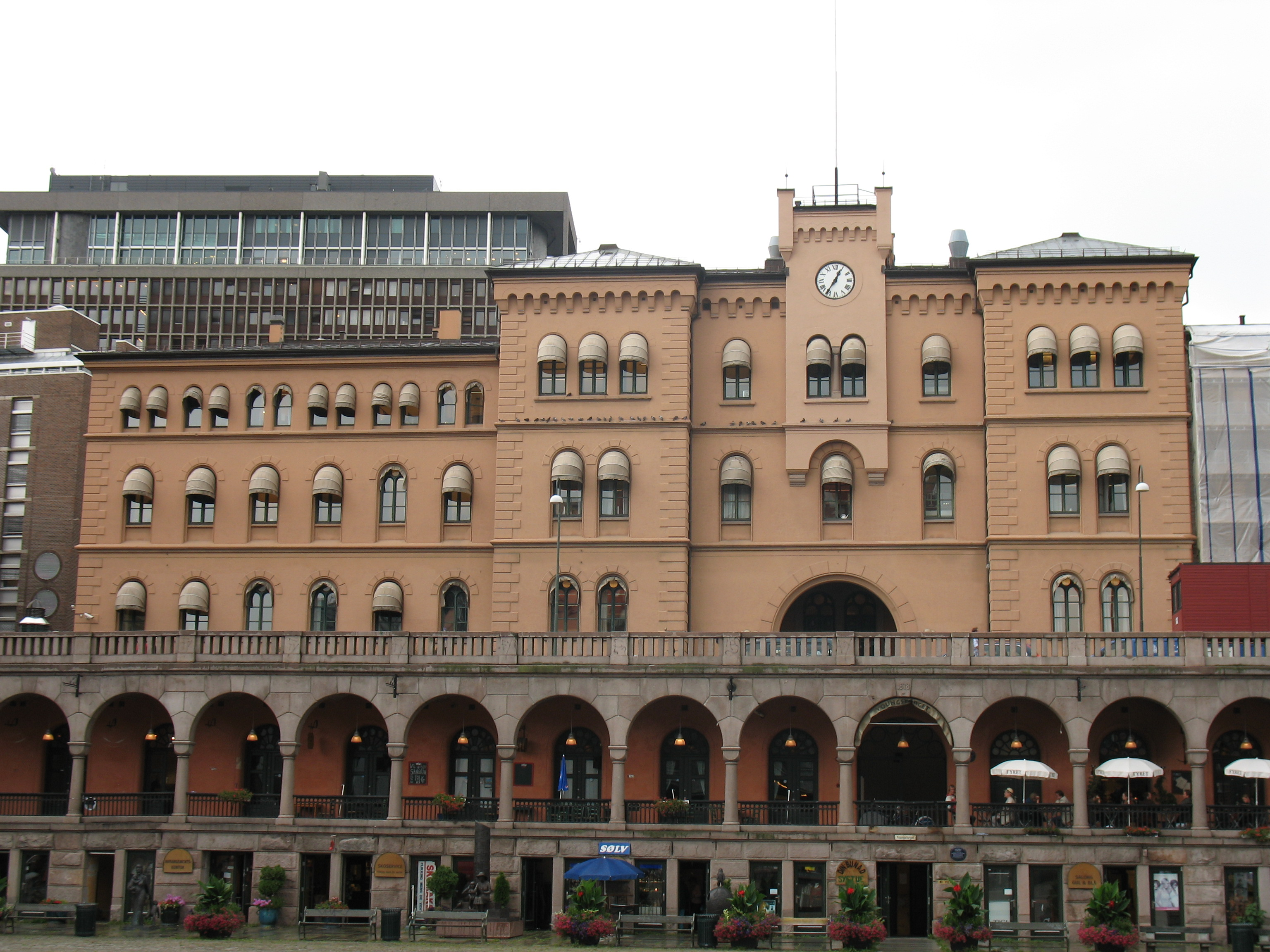
Former fire and police station at Møllergata 19 (1866)

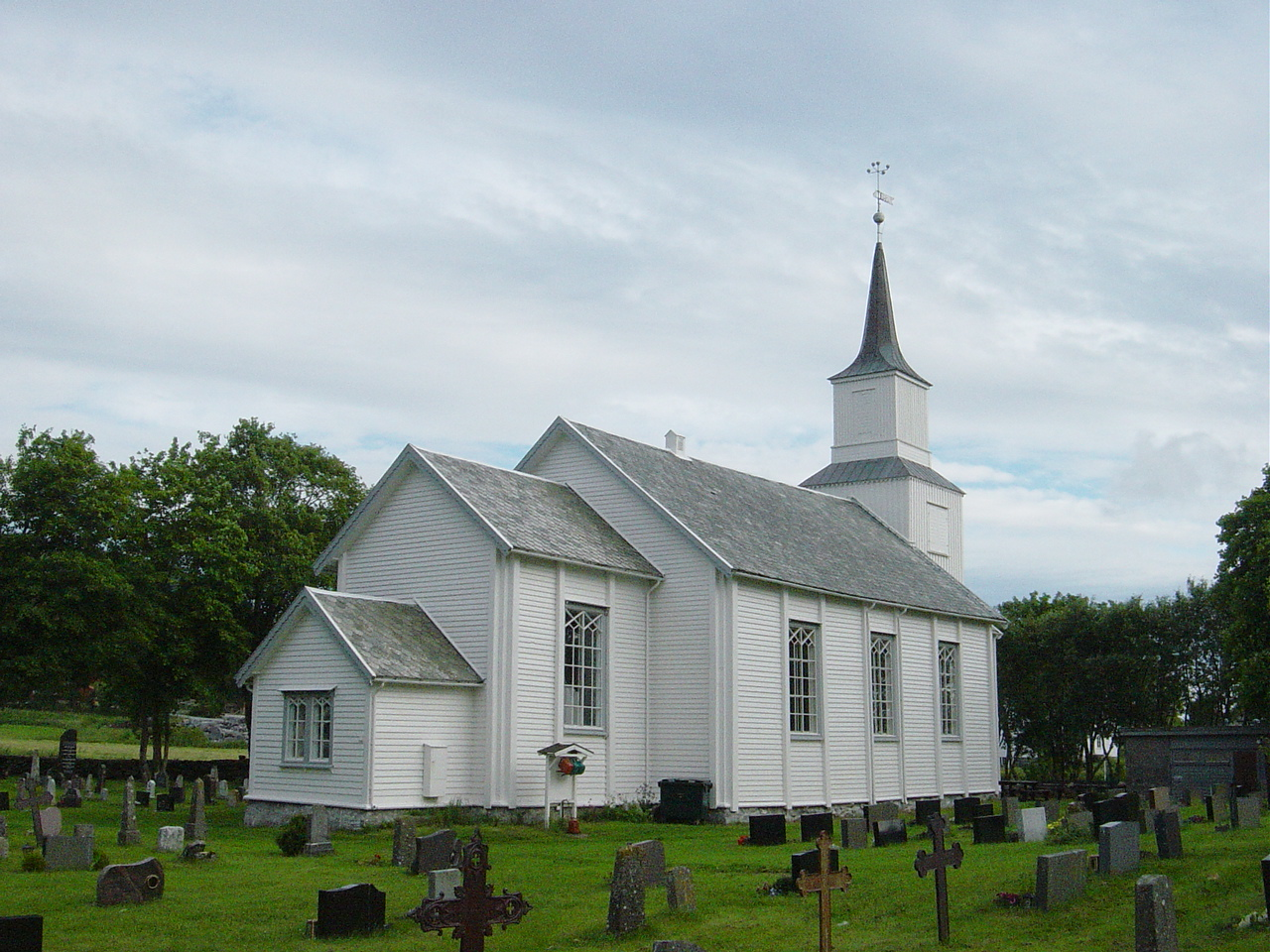
Hustad Church in Hustadvika Municipality (1874)

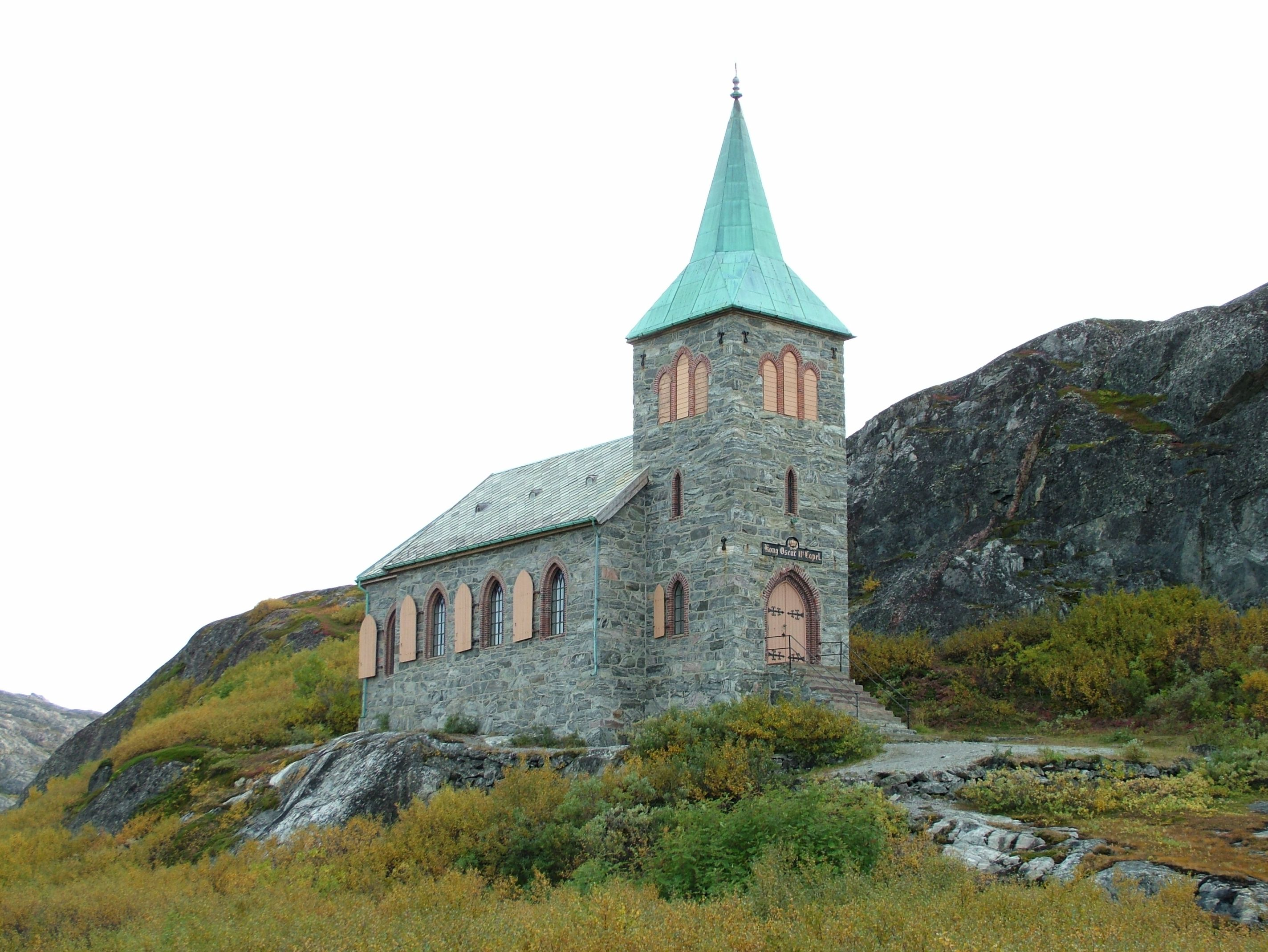
King Oscar II Chapel at Grense Jakobselv (1869)

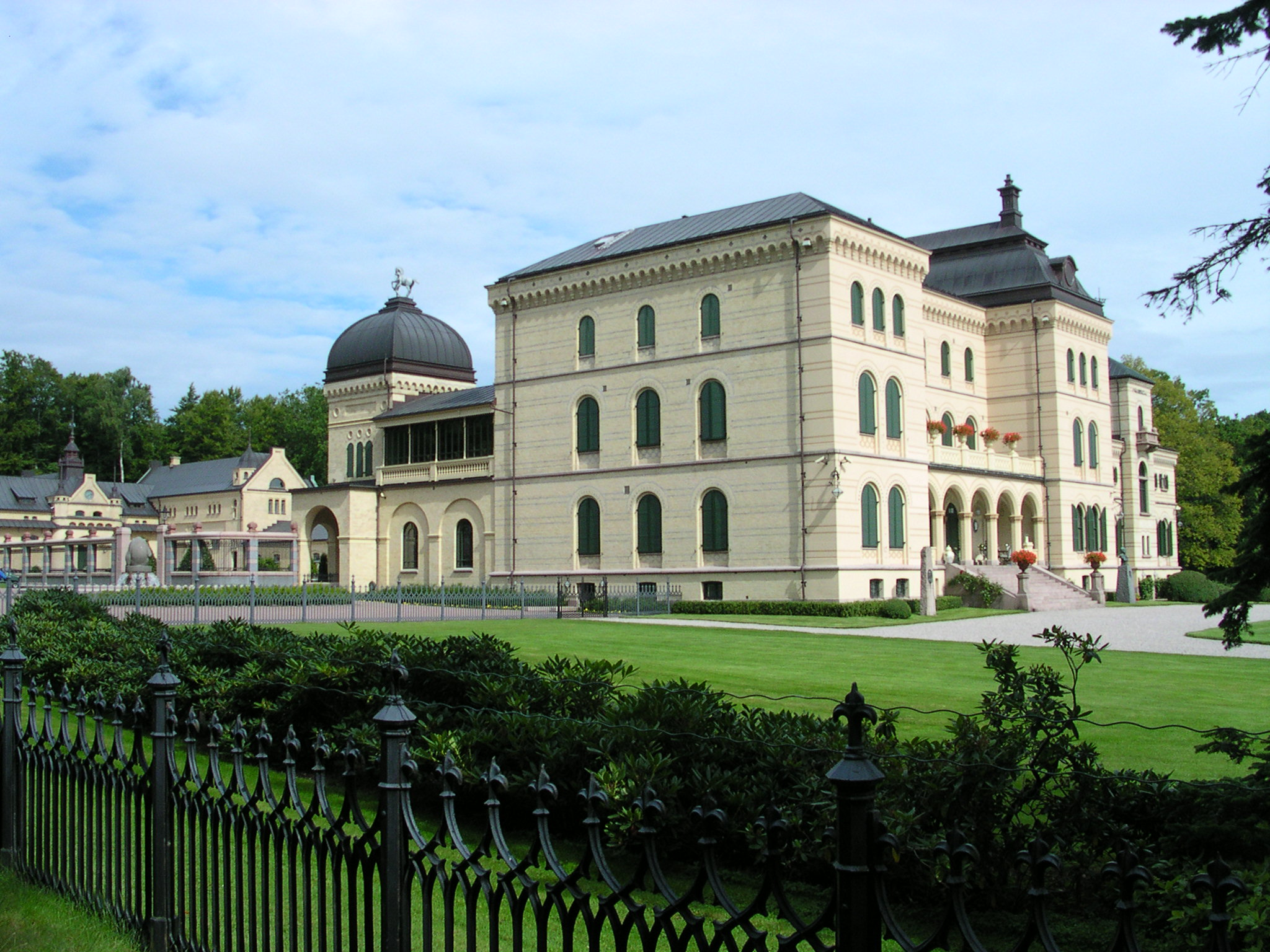
Fritzøehus Manor at Larvik (1860–63)
