= Jølster Municipality =

Former municipality in Sogn og Fjordane, Norway

Jølster Municipality Jølster kommune
- Former municipality
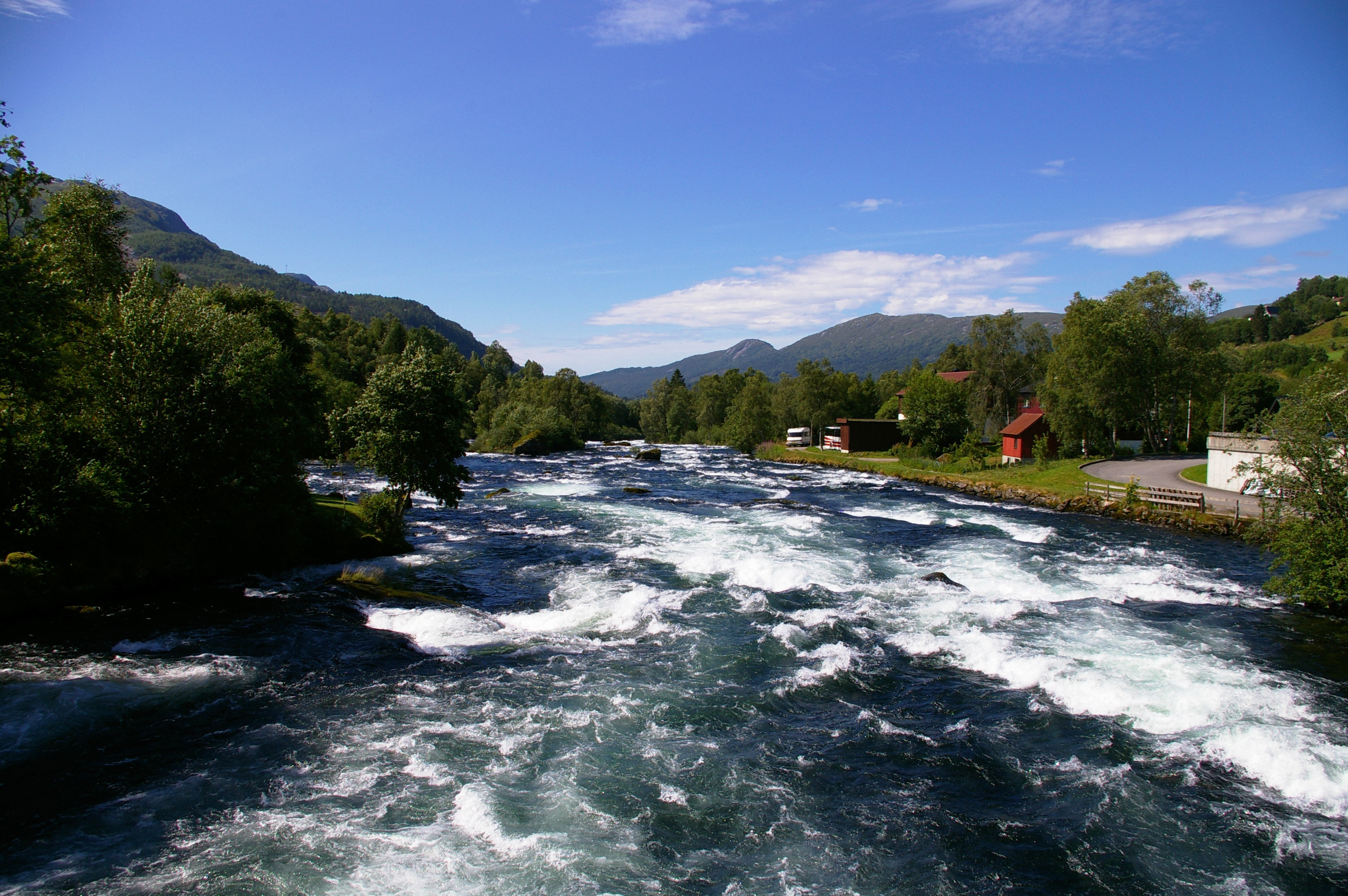
- View of the river Jølstra

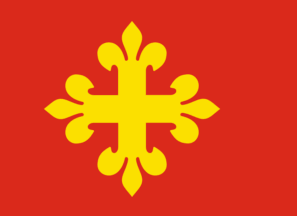
- Flag Coat of arms

- Sogn og Fjordane within Norway

- Jølster within Sogn og Fjordane
- Coordinates: 61°32′30″N 06°24′32″E
- Country: Norway
- County: Sogn og Fjordane
- District: Sunnfjord
- Established: 1 Jan 1838
  - Created as: Formannskapsdistrikt
- Disestablished: 1 Jan 2020
  - Succeeded by: Sunnfjord Municipality
- Administrative centre: Skei

Government
  - Mayor (2011–2019): Oddmund Klakegg (Sp)

Area (upon dissolution)
  - Total: 670.87 km^{2} (259.02 sq mi)
  - Land: 619.61 km^{2} (239.23 sq mi)
  - Water: 51.26 km^{2} (19.79 sq mi) 7.6%
  - Rank: #167 in Norway
- Highest elevation: 1,826.8 m (5,993 ft)

Population (2019)
  - Total: 3,047
  - Rank: #260 in Norway
  - Density: 4.5/km^{2} (12/sq mi)
  - Change (10 years): ▲ +3.3%
- Demonym: Jølstring

Official language
  - Norwegian form: Nynorsk
- Time zone: UTC+01:00 (CET)
  - Summer (DST): UTC+02:00 (CEST)
- ISO 3166 code: NO-1431

Jølster is a former municipality in the old Sogn og Fjordane county, Norway. The 671-square-kilometre (259 sq mi) municipality existed from 1838 until its dissolution in 2020. The area is now part of Sunnfjord Municipality in the traditional district of Sunnfjord in Vestland county. The administrative centre was the village of Skei. Other villages in the municipality included Helgheim, Ålhus, Vassenden, and Langhaugane.

Prior to its dissolution in 2020, the 670.87-square-kilometre (259.02 sq mi) municipality was the 167th largest by area out of the 422 municipalities in Norway. Jølster Municipality was the 260th most populous municipality in Norway with a population of about 3,047. The municipality's population density was 4.5 inhabitants per square kilometre (12/sq mi) and its population had increased by 3.3% over the previous 10-year period.

Jølster was located at the centre of the old Sogn og Fjordane county and was known for its rich cultural traditions in home crafts, folk music, song, dancing, and creative arts. Agriculture was the largest industry in the municipality. The principal attraction in Jølster was the scenery, with easy access to the glaciers Grovabreen, Jostedalsbreen, and Myklebustbreen. Jølster was home to part of the largest glacier of continental Europe, the Jostedalsbreen as well as a clear green lake named Jølstravatnet. The trout caught in Jølstravatn were renowned throughout Norway and beyond.

In 2016, the chief of police for Vestlandet formally suggested a reconfiguration of police districts and stations. He proposed that the police station in Jølster be closed.

== General information ==
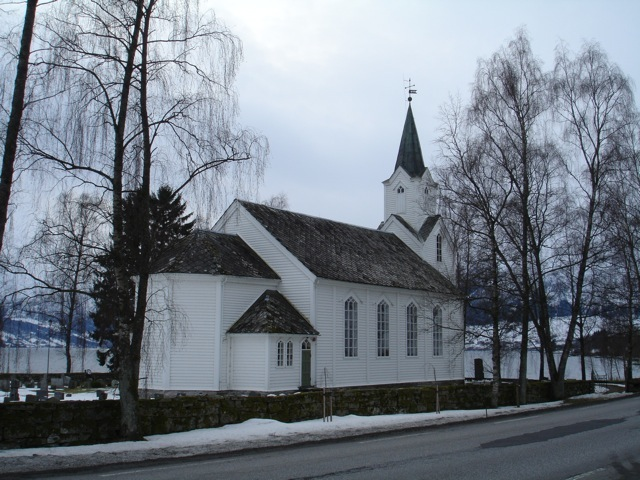
Helgheim Church in Jølster

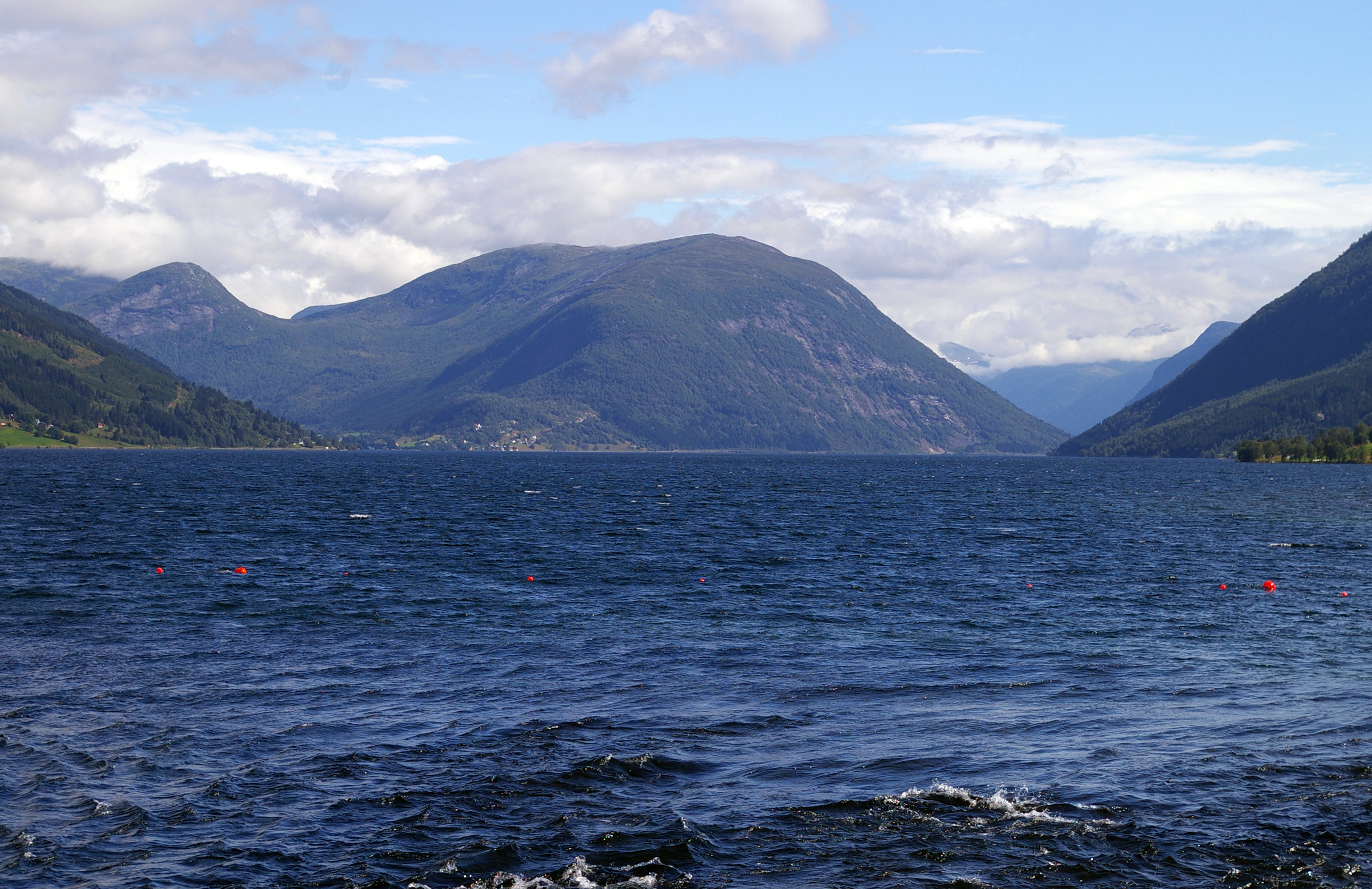
Jølstravatn

The parish of Jølster was established as a municipality on 1 January 1838 (see formannskapsdistrikt law). The original municipality was identical to the Jølster parish (prestegjeld) with the sub-parishes (sokn) of Ålhus and Helgheim.

During the 1960s, there were many municipal mergers across Norway due to the work of the Schei Committee. On 1 January 1964, the farm area of Førde in the neighboring Breim Municipality (population: 38) was transferred to Jølster Municipality.

On 1 January 2020, Jølster Municipality, Førde Municipality, Naustdal Municipality, and Gaular Municipality were merged to form the new Sunnfjord Municipality.

=== Name ===
The municipality (originally the parish) was named after the local river Jølstra (Old Norse: Jǫlmstr) since it runs through the lower parts of the municipality. The may be derived from the word jálmr which means "noise", likely referring to the noise and rumble of the river.

=== Coat of arms ===
The coat of arms was granted on 22 July 1983 and it was in use until 1 January 2020 when the municipality was dissolved. The official blazon is "Gules, a cross fleury Or" (Norwegian: På raud grunn ein gull liljekross). This means the arms have a red field (background) and the charge is a cross fleury. The cross has a tincture of Or which means it is commonly colored yellow, but if it is made out of metal, then gold is used. The arms are loosely inspired by the medieval arms of Audun Hugleiksson who was from Hegranes in Jølster. He was a medieval nobleman (died in 1302) who built Audunborg, one of only two private stone castles in Norway. On his seals, he used a shield with a rose that was surrounded with double tressure flory-counterflory. He also used the fleur-de-lis as ornamentation throughout his castle. The arms of Jølster were derived from this tressure and the fleur-de-lis. The modern arms were designed by Elsa Norunn Håheim Nydal who based it off an idea by Magnus Hardeland. The municipal flag has the same design as the coat of arms.

=== Churches ===
The Church of Norway had two parishes (sokn) within Jølster Municipality. It was part of the Sunnfjord prosti (deanery) in the Diocese of Bjørgvin.

Churches in Jølster Municipality
Parish (sokn)	Church name	Location of the church	Year built
Helgheim	Helgheim Church	Helgheim	1877
Ålhus	Vassenden Church	Vassenden	2002
Ålhus	Ålhus Church	Ålhus	1795

== Government ==
While it existed, Jølster Municipality was responsible for primary education (through 10th grade), outpatient health services, senior citizen services, welfare and other social services, zoning, economic development, and municipal roads and utilities. The municipality was governed by a municipal council of directly elected representatives. The mayor was indirectly elected by a vote of the municipal council. The municipality was under the jurisdiction of the Sogn og Fjordane District Court and the Gulating Court of Appeal.

=== Municipal council ===
The municipal council (Kommunestyre) of Jølster Municipality was made up of 25 representatives that were elected to four year terms. The tables below show the historical composition of the council by political party.

Jølster kommunestyre 2015–2019
Party name (in Nynorsk)	Number of representatives
Labour Party (Arbeidarpartiet)	4
Conservative Party (Høgre)	3
Christian Democratic Party (Kristeleg Folkeparti)	1
Centre Party (Senterpartiet)	12
Socialist Left Party (Sosialistisk Venstreparti)	2
Liberal Party (Venstre)	3
Total number of members:	25
Note: On 1 January 2020, Jølster Municipality, Gaular Municipality, Førde Municipality, and Naustdal Municipality were merged to form the new Sunnfjord Municipality.

Jølster kommunestyre 2011–2015
Party name (in Nynorsk)	Number of representatives
Labour Party (Arbeidarpartiet)	5
Progress Party (Framstegspartiet)	1
Conservative Party (Høgre)	3
Christian Democratic Party (Kristeleg Folkeparti)	2
Centre Party (Senterpartiet)	8
Socialist Left Party (Sosialistisk Venstreparti)	2
Liberal Party (Venstre)	4
Total number of members:	25

Jølster kommunestyre 2007–2011
Party name (in Nynorsk)	Number of representatives
Labour Party (Arbeidarpartiet)	5
Progress Party (Framstegspartiet)	2
Conservative Party (Høgre)	2
Christian Democratic Party (Kristeleg Folkeparti)	2
Centre Party (Senterpartiet)	9
Socialist Left Party (Sosialistisk Venstreparti)	1
Liberal Party (Venstre)	4
Total number of members:	25

Jølster kommunestyre 2003–2007
Party name (in Nynorsk)	Number of representatives
Labour Party (Arbeidarpartiet)	3
Progress Party (Framstegspartiet)	1
Conservative Party (Høgre)	1
Christian Democratic Party (Kristeleg Folkeparti)	2
Centre Party (Senterpartiet)	11
Socialist Left Party (Sosialistisk Venstreparti)	3
Liberal Party (Venstre)	4
Total number of members:	25

Jølster kommunestyre 1999–2003
Party name (in Nynorsk)	Number of representatives
Labour Party (Arbeidarpartiet)	4
Conservative Party (Høgre)	2
Christian Democratic Party (Kristeleg Folkeparti)	3
Centre Party (Senterpartiet)	10
Socialist Left Party (Sosialistisk Venstreparti)	2
Liberal Party (Venstre)	4
Total number of members:	25

Jølster kommunestyre 1995–1999
Party name (in Nynorsk)	Number of representatives
Labour Party (Arbeidarpartiet)	5
Conservative Party (Høgre)	2
Christian Democratic Party (Kristeleg Folkeparti)	3
Centre Party (Senterpartiet)	8
Socialist Left Party (Sosialistisk Venstreparti)	1
Liberal Party (Venstre)	6
Total number of members:	25

Jølster kommunestyre 1991–1995
Party name (in Nynorsk)	Number of representatives
Labour Party (Arbeidarpartiet)	4
Conservative Party (Høgre)	2
Christian Democratic Party (Kristeleg Folkeparti)	3
Centre Party (Senterpartiet)	11
Socialist Left Party (Sosialistisk Venstreparti)	2
Liberal Party (Venstre)	1
Common list (Samlingslista)	2
Total number of members:	25

Jølster kommunestyre 1987–1991
Party name (in Nynorsk)	Number of representatives
Labour Party (Arbeidarpartiet)	7
Conservative Party (Høgre)	3
Christian Democratic Party (Kristeleg Folkeparti)	4
Centre Party (Senterpartiet)	6
Socialist Left Party (Sosialistisk Venstreparti)	1
Common list (Samlingslista)	4
Total number of members:	25

Jølster kommunestyre 1983–1987
Party name (in Nynorsk)	Number of representatives
Labour Party (Arbeidarpartiet)	4
Conservative Party (Høgre)	2
Christian Democratic Party (Kristeleg Folkeparti)	4
Centre Party (Senterpartiet)	5
Common list (Samlingslista)	6
Local list (Bygdeliste)	4
Total number of members:	25

Jølster kommunestyre 1979–1983
Party name (in Nynorsk)	Number of representatives
Labour Party (Arbeidarpartiet)	3
Conservative Party (Høgre)	3
Christian Democratic Party (Kristeleg Folkeparti)	4
Centre Party (Senterpartiet)	8
Common list (Samlingsliste)	3
Local list for Helgheim parish (Bygdeliste for Helgheim sokn)	4
Total number of members:	25

Jølster kommunestyre 1975–1979
Party name (in Nynorsk)	Number of representatives
Labour Party (Arbeidarpartiet)	1
Christian Democratic Party (Kristeleg Folkeparti)	3
Centre Party (Senterpartiet)	6
Election list for Middle and Inner Jølster (Valliste for Midtre og Indre Jølster)	10
Common list (Samlingsliste)	5
Total number of members:	25

Jølster kommunestyre 1971–1975
Party name (in Nynorsk)	Number of representatives
Local List(s) (Lokale lister)	25
Total number of members:	25

Jølster kommunestyre 1968–1971
Party name (in Nynorsk)	Number of representatives
Local List(s) (Lokale lister)	25
Total number of members:	25

Jølster kommunestyre 1963–1967
Party name (in Nynorsk)	Number of representatives
Local List(s) (Lokale lister)	25
Total number of members:	25

Jølster heradsstyre 1959–1963
Party name (in Nynorsk)	Number of representatives
Labour Party (Arbeidarpartiet)	5
Centre Party (Senterpartiet)	12
Joint List(s) of Non-Socialist Parties (Borgarlege Felleslister)	8
Total number of members:	25

Jølster heradsstyre 1955–1959
Party name (in Nynorsk)	Number of representatives
Labour Party (Arbeidarpartiet)	5
Farmers' Party (Bondepartiet)	12
Joint List(s) of Non-Socialist Parties (Borgarlege Felleslister)	8
Total number of members:	25

Jølster heradsstyre 1951–1955
Party name (in Nynorsk)	Number of representatives
Labour Party (Arbeidarpartiet)	5
Farmers' Party (Bondepartiet)	15
Liberal Party (Venstre)	5
Local List(s) (Lokale lister)	3
Total number of members:	28

Jølster heradsstyre 1947–1951
Party name (in Nynorsk)	Number of representatives
Labour Party (Arbeidarpartiet)	2
Liberal Party (Venstre)	3
List of workers, fishermen, and small farmholders (Arbeidarar, fiskarar, småbrukarar liste)	3
Local List(s) (Lokale lister)	20
Total number of members:	28

Jølster heradsstyre 1945–1947
Party name (in Nynorsk)	Number of representatives
Labour Party (Arbeidarpartiet)	5
Liberal Party (Venstre)	4
Local List(s) (Lokale lister)	19
Total number of members:	28

Jølster heradsstyre 1937–1941*
Party name (in Nynorsk)	Number of representatives
Labour Party (Arbeidarpartiet)	7
Farmers' Party (Bondepartiet)	12
Joint List(s) of Non-Socialist Parties (Borgarlege Felleslister)	9
Total number of members:	28
Note: Due to the German occupation of Norway during World War II, no elections were held for new municipal councils until after the war ended in 1945.

=== Mayors ===
The mayor (Nynorsk: ordførar) of Jølster Municipality was the political leader of the municipality and the chairperson of the municipal council. The following people have held this position:

- 1838–1841: Thor Hansen Veiteberg
- 1842–1843: Samuel N. Dvergsdal
- 1844–1847: Anders J. Aalhus
- 1848–1855: Michael Fasting
- 1856–1857: Samuel N. Dvergsdal
- 1858–1861: Anders J. Aalhus
- 1861–1863: Ludvig G. Klakegg
- 1864–1871: Nils O. Øvrebø
- 1872–1873: Anders K. Myklebust
- 1874–1875: Anton K. Øygard
- 1876–1877: Bendikt J. Nedrebø
- 1878–1879: Anders K. Myklebust
- 1880–1889: Sjur B. Heggheim
- 1890–1891: Ole O. Viken
- 1892–1899: Nils S. Dvergsdal
- 1900–1909: Sjur B. Heggheim
- 1910–1919: Thor H. Veiteberg, Jr.
- 1920–1929: Ludvig D. Klakegg
- 1929–1936: Nils O. Øvrebø
- 1936–1942: Anton K. Øygard
- 1942–1945: Arne Egge (NS)
- 1945–1951: Anton K. Øygard
- 1952–1965: Nils J. Helgheim (Sp)
- 1966–1973: Erling Slåtten (LL)
- 1974–1981: Sverre P. Befring (Sp)
- 1982–1985: Anders Helgheim (LL)
- 1986–1987: Arne Sandnes (Ap)
- 1988–1991: Normann Aarseth (KrF)
- 1992–1995: Knut O. Øygard (Sp)
- 1995–2011: Gerd Dvergsdal (Sp)
- 2011–2019: Oddmund Klakegg (Sp)

== Geography ==
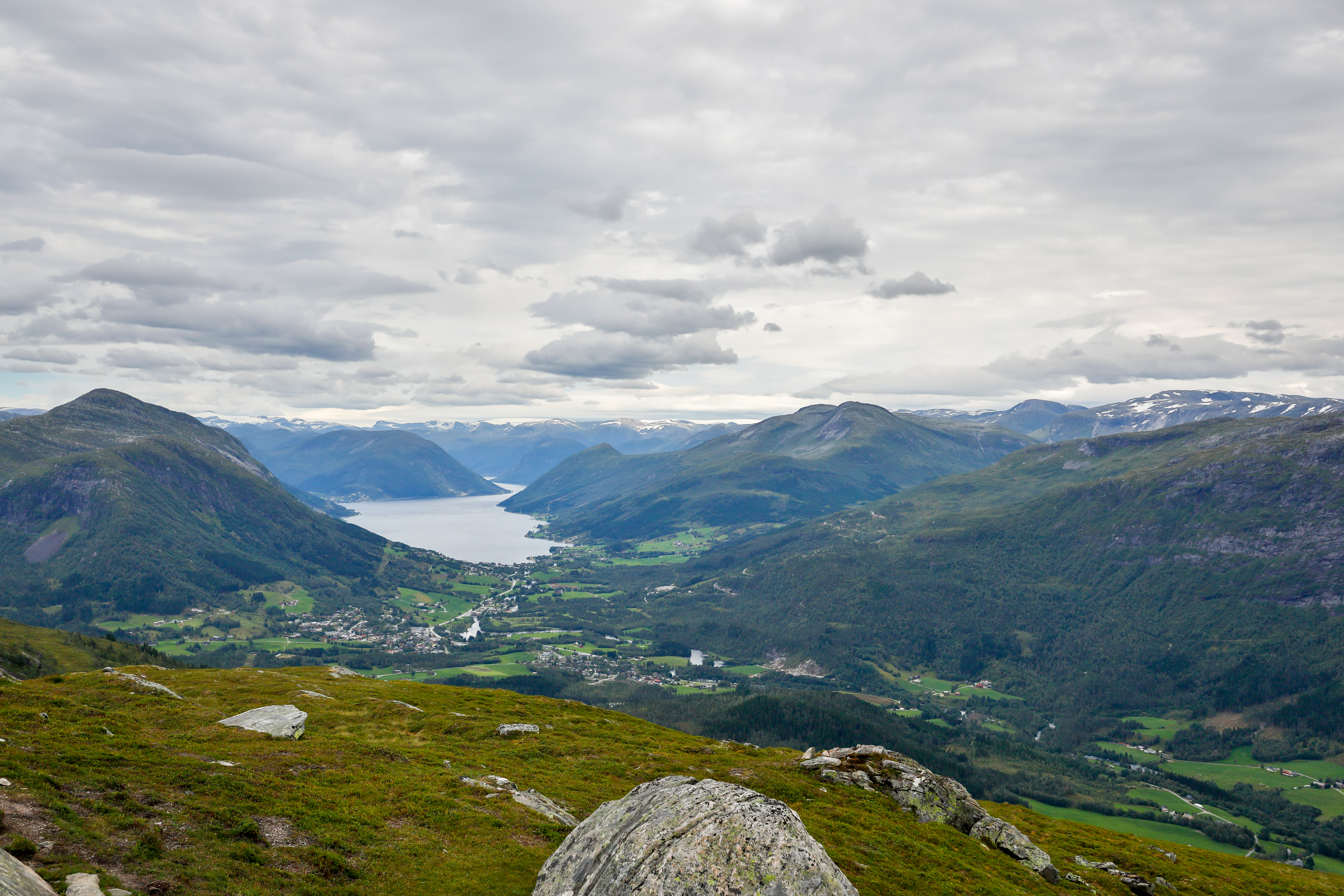
View from Eikåsnipa towards Jølstravatnet.

The Jølstravatnet lake split the municipality in half, which created a centre of population at each end of the lake: Skei in the eastern end of the lake and Vassenden (lit. 'the water-end') in the western part, where the river Jølstra starts. A small end of the lake Breimsvatnet crosses over into Jølster Municipality. The highest point in the municipality was the 1,826.8-metre (5,993 ft) tall mountain Snønipa, on the border with Gloppen Municipality.

Jølster Municipality was bordered to the north by Stryn Municipality and Gloppen Municipality, to the east by Luster Municipality, to the southeast by Sogndal Municipality, and to the south and west by Førde Municipality. The Jostedalsbreen National Park was partially located within this municipality.

== Economy ==
Tourism is one of the largest industries in Jølster, and there are hotels, campsites, and a number of tourist facilities in each centre of the municipality. In addition to tourism, agriculture and construction are the other most important industries.

== Attractions ==
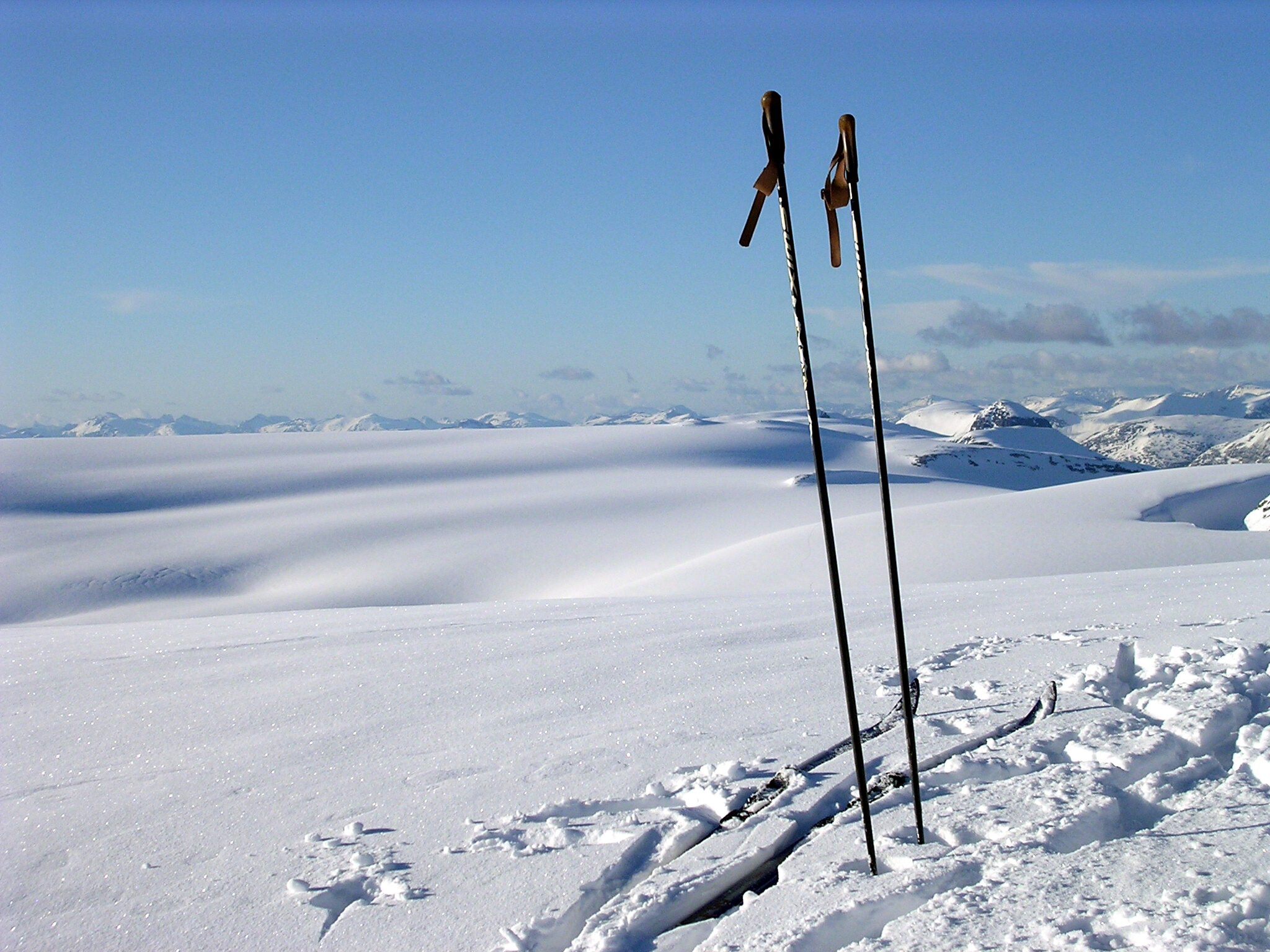
View from Snønipa to the north

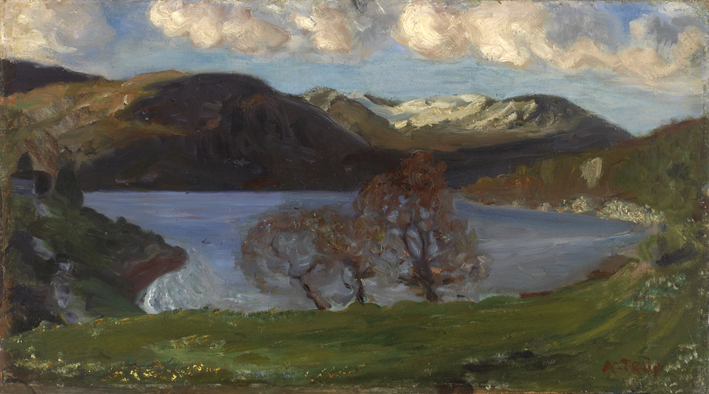
Painting by Nikolai Astrup

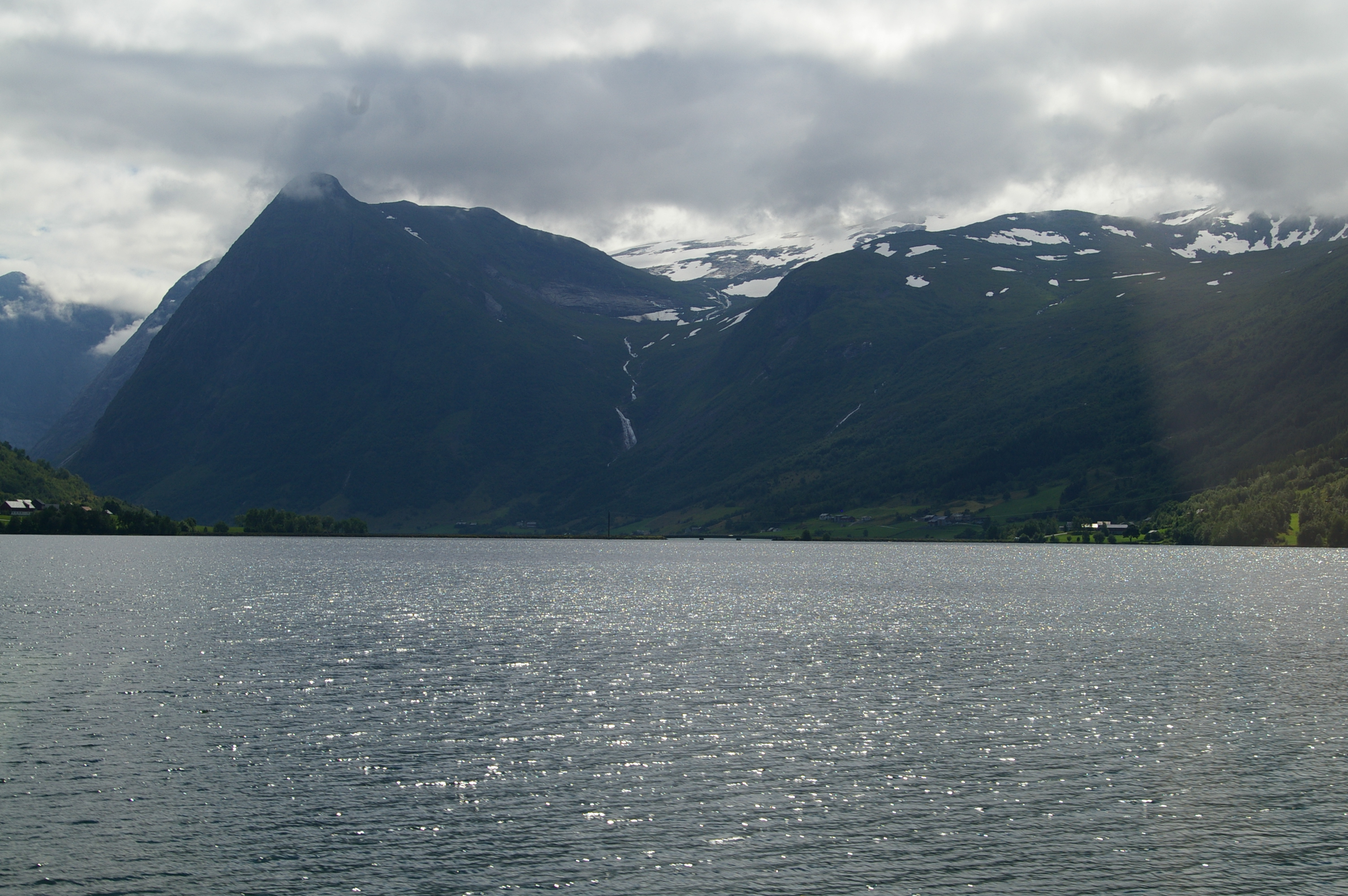
Jølstervatn

=== Astruptunet ===
Astruptunet was the home of the painter Nikolai Astrup (1880–1928) for the last fourteen years of his life. The Astrup Farm (Astruptunet) was the artist's home and small farm, but today it is a museum and art gallery, kept as it was in Astrup's days, nestled among the steep but fertile slopes on the south side of Jølstravatn. The barn was torn down and rebuilt as a gallery, but in the same style as the old barn. The gallery has permanent exhibitions of Astrup's work such as paintings, graphics, wood-engraving plates and sketches. Most of his scenes have been taken from Jølster and Nikolai Astrup has since remained one of the most Norwegian of our national artists.

Nikolai Astrup lived most of his life in Jølster. Astrup often is regarded as the artist of Western Norway, as he found virtually all of his motives in his home surroundings. He's considered the "most Norwegian" of all the national artists of Norway.

=== Eikaas Gallery ===
Another Norwegian painter and graphic artist, Ludvig Eikaas, is closely connected to Jølster. The artist grew up in Jølster, but later moved to Oslo. He is among other things famous for his non-figurative art and portraits/self-portraits.

The Eikaas Gallery was originally an old dairy farm in Ålhus that was purchased by the municipality of Jølster and converted to a modern art gallery. The collection contains about 300 works of art by Ludvig Eikaas.

=== Jølstra Museum ===
The Jølstra museum is a private village green with many original Jølstra buildings and a collection of around 3,000 artifacts. There are also exhibitions of paintings by Ludvig Eikaas and Oddvar Torsheim and of Jølster textiles.

=== Jølster Alpine Ski Centre ===
Jølster alpine ski centre lies at Vassenden. There are lighted ski trails in the villages of Årdal and Dvergsdalen. Jølster also has mountains for Telemark skiing enthusiasts.

== See also ==
- List of former municipalities of Norway
