= Dvergsdal =

Dvergsdal is a Norwegian surname. Notable people with the surname include:

- Gerd Dvergsdal (born 1946), Norwegian politician
- Nils S. Dvergsdal (1842–1921), Norwegian politician
