= Skei, Vestland =

Village in Sunnfjord Municipality, Norway

Skei Skei i Jølster
- Village
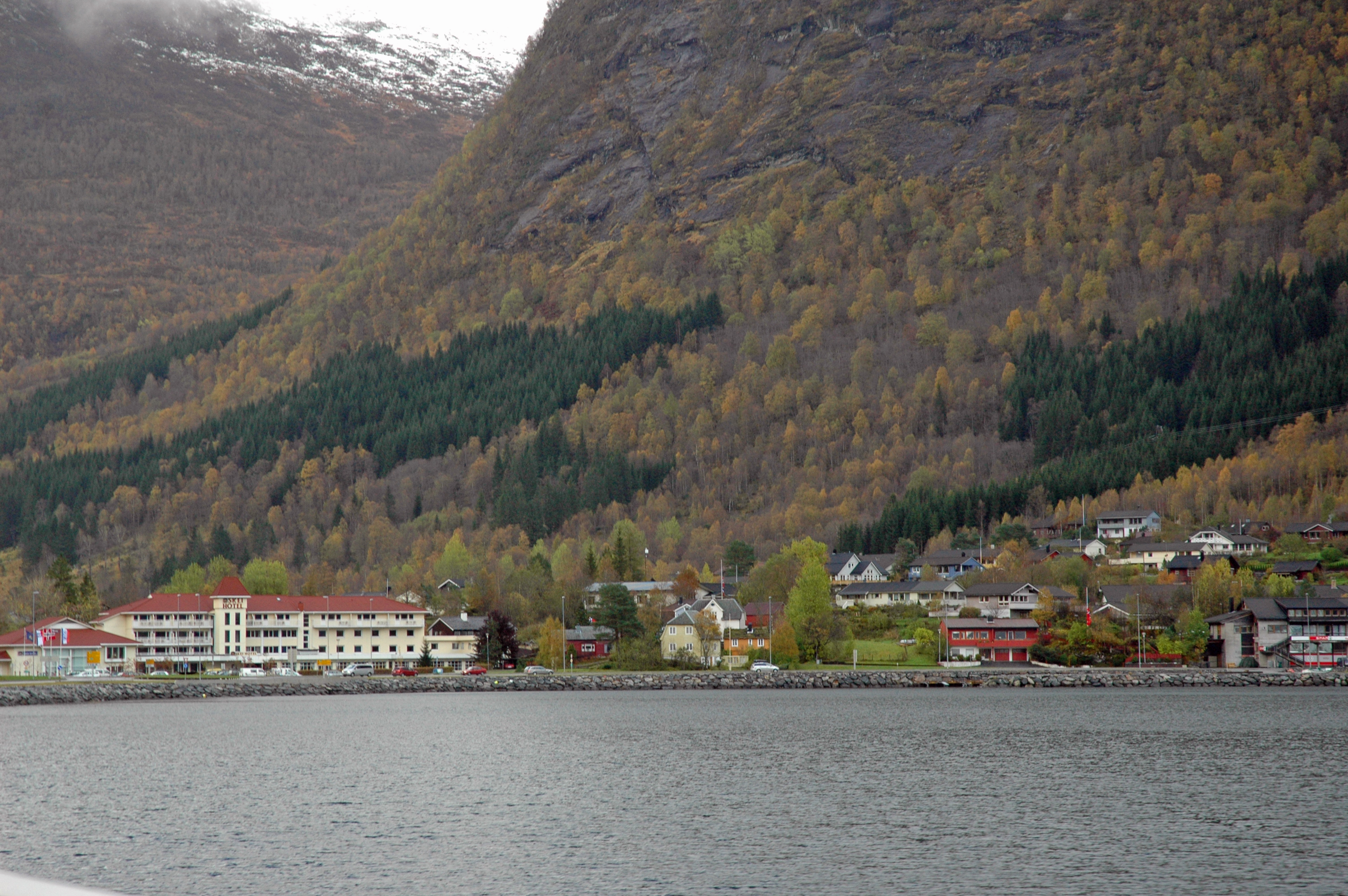
- View of the village
- Interactive map of Skei
- Location within Vestland Location within Norway
- Coordinates: 61.5715°N 6.4791°E
- Country: Norway
- Region: Western Norway
- County: Vestland
- District: Sunnfjord
- Municipality: Sunnfjord Municipality

Area
  - Total: 0.58 km^{2} (0.22 sq mi)
- Elevation: 208 m (682 ft)

Population (2025)
  - Total: 549
  - Density: 947/km^{2} (2,450/sq mi)
- Time zone: UTC+01:00 (CET)
  - Summer (DST): UTC+02:00 (CEST)
- Post Code: 6843 Skei i Jølster

Skei (also known as Skei i Jølster) is a village in Sunnfjord Municipality in Vestland county, Norway. The village is located at the northeastern end of the lake Jølstravatnet. Skei is 20 kilometres (12 mi) south of the village of Byrkjelo (in Gloppen Municipality), 25 kilometres (16 mi) northeast of the villages of Vassenden/Langhaugane, and about 13 kilometres (8.1 mi) east of the village of Ålhus.

Skei is located just west of Jostedalsbreen National Park. The village lies at the intersection of two major regional highways: European route E39 and Norwegian National Road 5. The village of Helgheim, where the Helgheim Church is located, sits about 4 kilometres (2.5 mi) west of Skei on the northern shore of the lake Jølstravatnet.

The 0.58-square-kilometre (140-acre) village has a population (2025) of 549 and a population density of 947 inhabitants per square kilometre (2,450/sq mi).

== Etymology ==
The name Skei comes from the Old Norse word skeið, which means Horse racing track.

== History ==
The village was the administrative centre of the old Jølster Municipality until its dissolution in 2020.

== Climate ==
The climate of Skei i strongly influenced by the surrounding terrain. It has less yearly precipitation than places closer to the coast such as Førde, but has cooler winters and more reliable snow cover as a result of the more inland location. Skei can also experience cold katabatic winds that result from cold air build ups on the surrounding glaciers.

Climate data for Skei i Jøster 1991–2020 (205 m)
Month	Jan	Feb	Mar	Apr	May	Jun	Jul	Aug	Sep	Oct	Nov	Dec	Year
Average precipitation mm (inches)	205.6 (8.09)	182.9 (7.20)	166.2 (6.54)	101.5 (4.00)	91.2 (3.59)	100.0 (3.94)	110.5 (4.35)	137.2 (5.40)	190.7 (7.51)	181.6 (7.15)	192.5 (7.58)	225.5 (8.88)	1,885.4 (74.23)
Average precipitation days (≥ 1.0 mm)	17	16	16	12	12	13	15	17	16	16	15	18	183
Source: NOAA WMO averages 91-2020 Norway

== Notable people ==
- Asgeir Årdal (born 1983), a Norwegian cross-country skier
