= Ålhus Church =

Church in Vestland, Norway

- Ålhus kyrkje
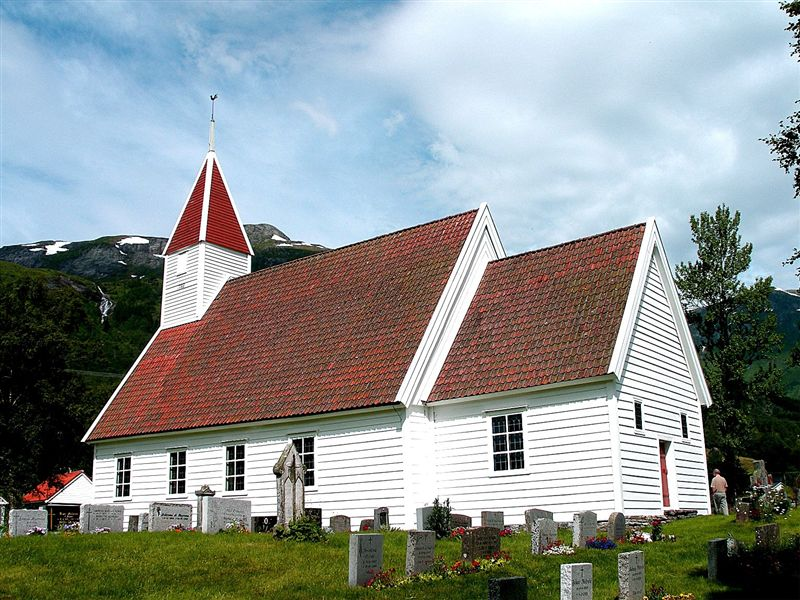
- View of the church
- Ålhus Church
- 61°31′51″N 6°14′03″E
- Location: Sunnfjord Municipality, Vestland
- Country: Norway
- Denomination: Church of Norway
- Previous denomination: Catholic Church
- Churchmanship: Evangelical Lutheran

History
- Status: Parish church
- Founded: 12th century
- Consecrated: 1795

Architecture
- Functional status: Active
- Architect: G.G. Støfringshaug
- Architectural type: Long church
- Completed: 1795 (231 years ago)

Specifications
- Capacity: 168
- Materials: Wood

Administration
- Diocese: Bjørgvin bispedømme
- Deanery: Sunnfjord prosti
- Parish: Ålhus
- Norwegian Cultural Heritage Site
- Type: Church
- Status: Automatically protected
- ID: 85961

Ålhus Church (Norwegian: Ålhus kyrkje) is a parish church of the Church of Norway in Sunnfjord Municipality in Vestland county, Norway. It is located in the village of Ålhus on the northern shore of the lake Jølstravatnet. It is one of two churches for the Ålhus parish which is part of the Sunnfjord prosti (deanery) in the Diocese of Bjørgvin. The white, wooden church was built in a long church style in 1795 by the architect Gunder Gregoriussen Støfringshaug. The church seats about 168 people.

== History ==
The earliest existing historical records of the church date back to the year 1322, but the church was not new at that time. The first church at Ålhus in Jølster was a wooden stave church that was likely built during the 12th century. In 1660, a new timber-framed church porch with a tower was constructed on the west end of the church. In 1795, most of the old church was torn down (except for the relatively new extension from 1660 which was retained). A new timber-framed long church was rebuilt on the same spot. That relatively new part of the old church that wasn't torn down was re-used as the choir of the new church. The new church was designed by the architect Gunder Gregoriussen Støfringshaug. The architect also incorporated a door from the old church in the new church. The old door dates back to the 12th or 13th century. It is said that the door originally came from a castle that belonged to Audun Hugleiksson.

In 1814, this church served as an election church (Norwegian: valgkirke). Together with more than 300 other parish churches across Norway, it was a polling station for elections to the 1814 Norwegian Constituent Assembly which wrote the Constitution of Norway. This was Norway's first national elections. Each church parish was a constituency that elected people called "electors" who later met together in each county to elect the representatives for the assembly that was to meet at Eidsvoll Manor later that year.

The church was restored in 1868 which included installing larger windows. In 1933, a new sacristy was constructed on the east end. The church was renovated and restored again from 1947 to 1951.

== Media gallery ==
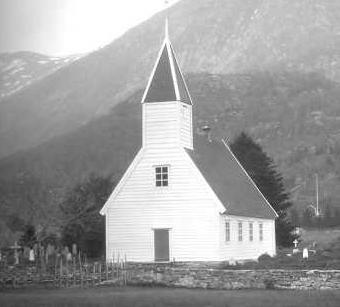
View of the church from 1926

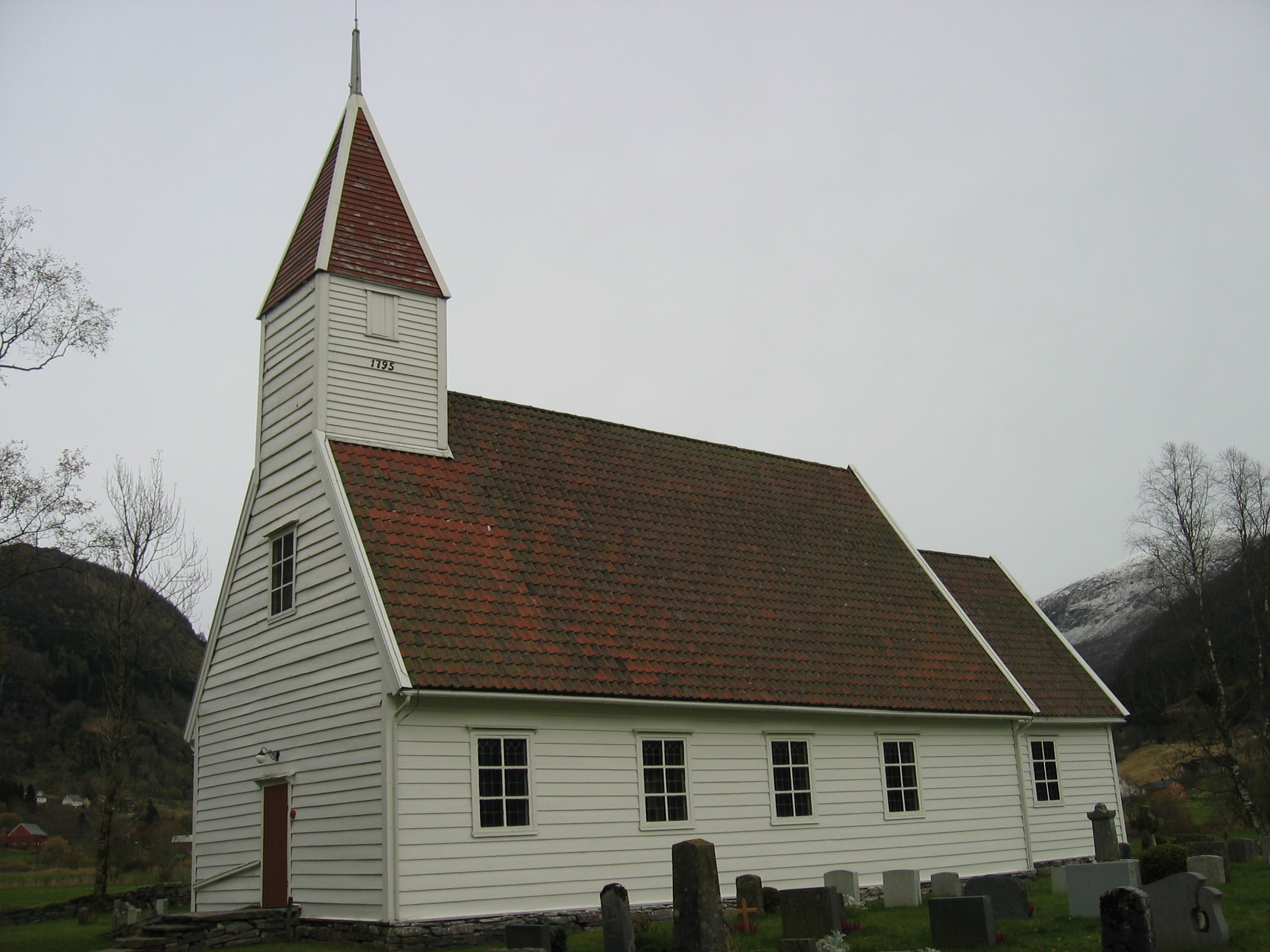
View of the church

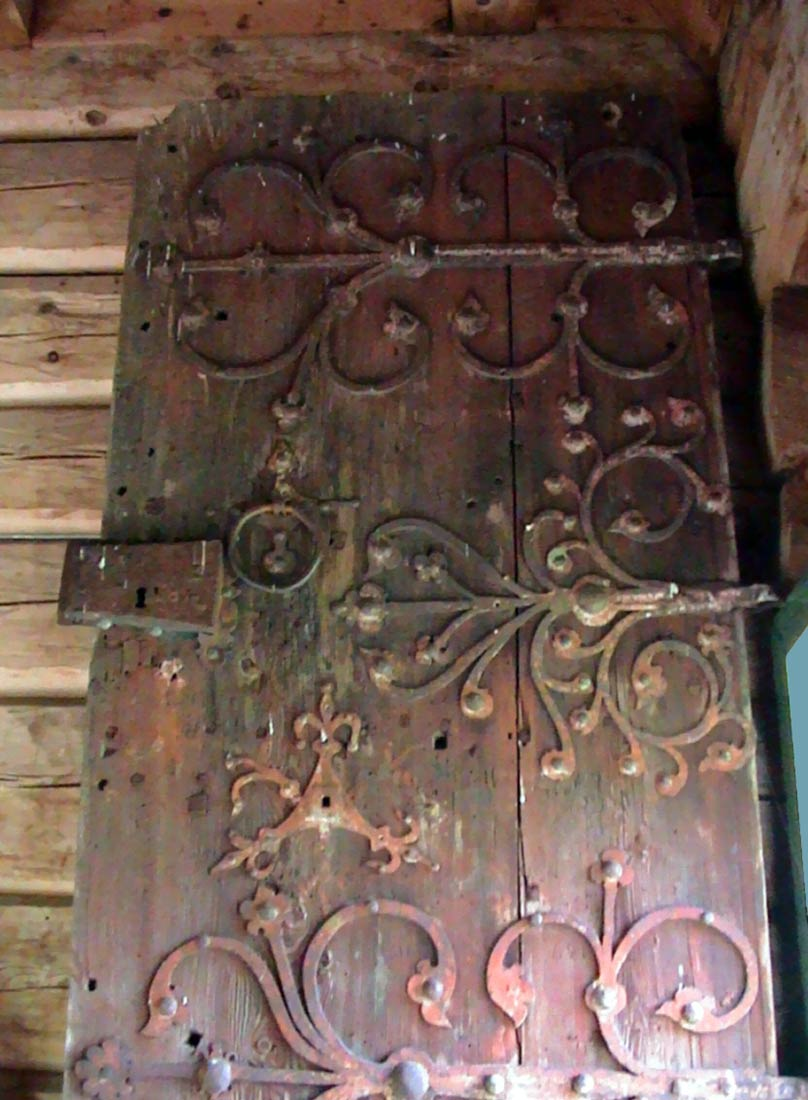
The old door from the castle

== See also ==
- List of churches in Bjørgvin
