= Ålhus =

Village in Sunnfjord Municipality, Norway

- Village
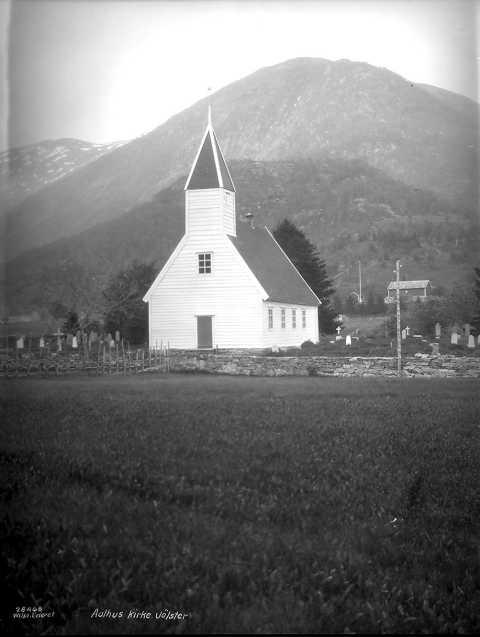
- Photograph of Ålhus Church; Credit: Anders Beer Wilse
- Interactive map of Ålhus
- Location within Vestland Location within Norway
- Coordinates: 61.53035°N 6.23224°E
- Country: Norway
- Region: Western Norway
- County: Vestland
- District: Sunnfjord
- Municipality: Sunnfjord Municipality
- Elevation: 210 m (690 ft)

Population (2007)
  - Total: 262
- Time zone: UTC+01:00 (CET)
  - Summer (DST): UTC+02:00 (CEST)
- Post Code: 6847 Vassenden

Ålhus is a small village in Sunnfjord Municipality in Vestland county, Norway. It is located along the European route E39 highway on the northern side of the lake Jølstravatnet, in a largely agricultural area. Ålhus is located about 15 kilometres (9.3 mi) west of the villages of Helgheim and Skei and about 8 kilometres (5.0 mi) northeast of the villages of Vassenden and Langhaugane.

== History ==
Ålhus was chosen as the millennium site for the old Jølster Municipality, due to its historical significance. Audun Hugleiksson erected a stone castle called Audunborg here in the 13th century. The 18th-century Ålhus Church is also located in the village. Nikolai Astrup, the famous Norwegian painter, grew up here.
