= Håheim =

Håheim is a Norwegian surname. Notable people with the surname include:

- Marianne Clementine Håheim (born 1987), Norwegian author
- Stine Renate Håheim (born 1984), Norwegian politician
