= Asgeir Årdal =

Norwegian cross-country skier

Personal information
- Nationality: Norway
- Born: November 30, 1983 (age 42) Jølster, Norway

Sport
- Sport: Skiing
- Club: Jølster IL

World Cup career
- Seasons: 4 – (2005–2008)
- Indiv. starts: 4
- Indiv. podiums: 0
- Team starts: 0
- Overall titles: 0 – (143rd in 2008)
- Discipline titles: 0

Asgeir Mandelid Årdal (born 30 November 1983) is a Norwegian cross-country skier. He made his FIS Cross-Country World Cup debut in March 2005 in Drammen, Norway. He collected his first World Cup points with a 24th place finish in Drammen in March 2008.

Årdal represents the sports club Jølster IL, based in Sunnfjord Municipality in Vestland. He currently lives in the village of Skei in Sunnfjord Municipality.

== Cross-country skiing results ==
All results are sourced from the International Ski Federation (FIS).

=== World Cup ===
==== Season standings ====
Season	Age	Discipline standings			Ski Tour standings	
Season	Age	Overall	Distance	Sprint	Tour de Ski	World Cup Final
2005	21	NC	—	NC	—N/a	—N/a
2006	22	NC	—	NC	—N/a	—N/a
2007	23	NC	—	NC	—	—N/a
2008	24	143	—	97	—	—
