= Langhaugane =

Village in Sunnfjord Municipality, Norway

Langhaugane Langhågane
- Village
- Interactive map of Langhaugane
- Location within Vestland Location within Norway
- Coordinates: 61.48072°N 6.06246°E
- Country: Norway
- Region: Western Norway
- County: Vestland
- District: Sunnfjord
- Municipality: Sunnfjord Municipality

Area
  - Total: 0.57 km^{2} (0.22 sq mi)
- Elevation: 185 m (607 ft)

Population (2025)
  - Total: 893
  - Density: 1,567/km^{2} (4,060/sq mi)
- Time zone: UTC+01:00 (CET)
  - Summer (DST): UTC+02:00 (CEST)
- Post Code: 6847 Vassenden

Langhaugane is a village along the river Jølstra in Sunnfjord Municipality in Vestland county, Norway. It is located along the European route E39 highway, about 2 kilometres (1.2 mi) west of the village of Vassenden, near the western end of the lake Jølstravatnet. The village of Skei is 25 kilometres (16 mi) northeast of Langhaugane at the other end of the lake, and the town of Førde is located about 17 kilometres (11 mi) to the southwest.

The 0.57-square-kilometre (140-acre) village has a population (2025) of 893 and a population density of 1,567 inhabitants per square kilometre (4,060/sq mi).
