= Sunnfjord Municipality =

Municipality in Vestland, Norway

Sunnfjord Municipality Sunnfjord kommune
- Municipality
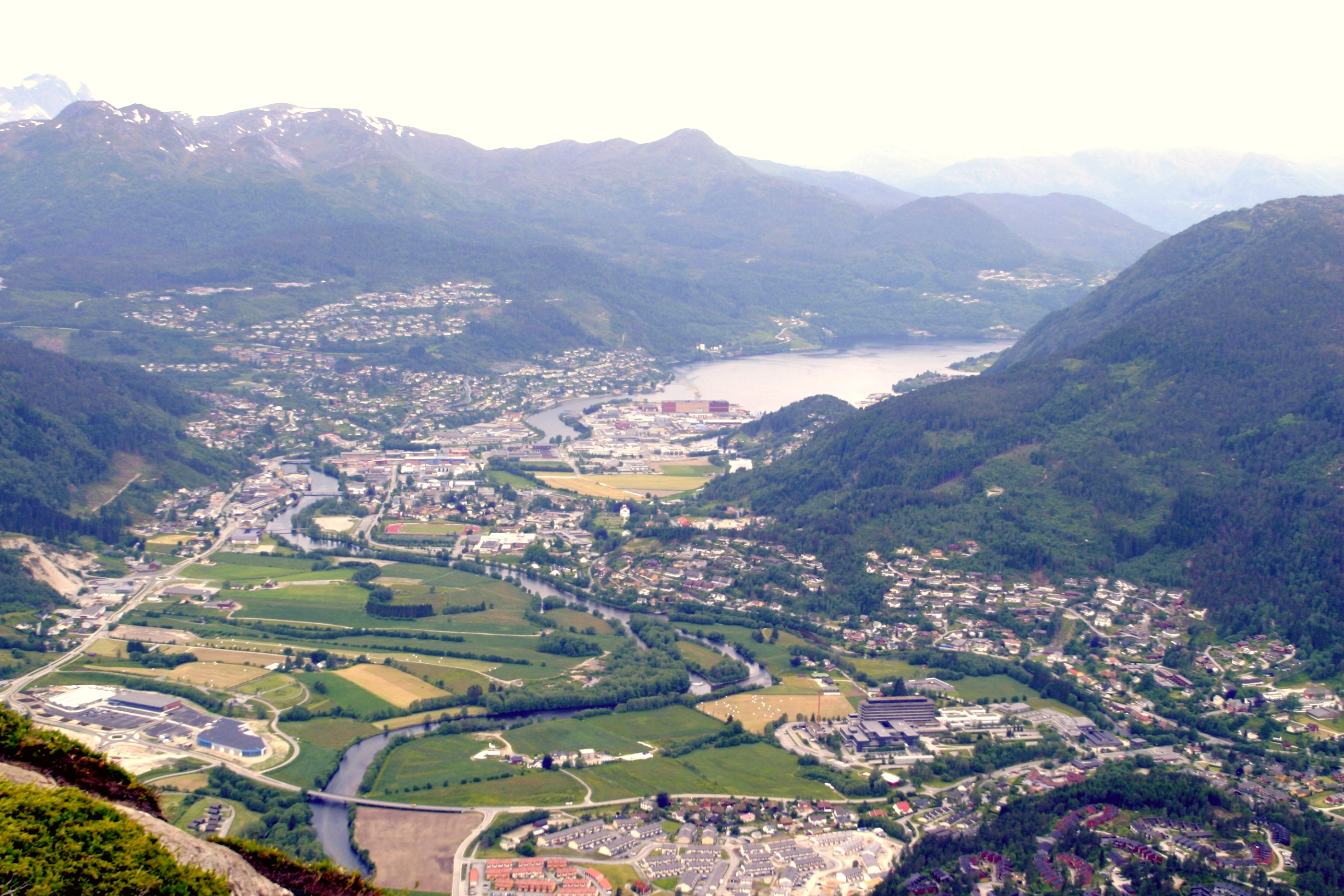
- Aerial view of the town of Førde

- Coat of arms

- Vestland within Norway

- Sunnfjord within Vestland
- Coordinates: 61.4522°N 5.8572°E
- Country: Norway
- County: Vestland
- District: Sunnfjord
- Established: 1 Jan 2020
  - Preceded by: Naustdal, Førde, Gaular, and Jølster
- Administrative centre: Førde

Government
  - Mayor (2021): Jenny Ellaug Følling (SP)

Area
  - Total: 2,208.13 km^{2} (852.56 sq mi)
  - Land: 2,065.34 km^{2} (797.43 sq mi)
  - Water: 142.79 km^{2} (55.13 sq mi) 6.5%
  - Rank: #27 in Norway
- Highest elevation: 1,826.43 m (5,992.2 ft)

Population (2025)
  - Total: 22,662
  - Rank: #56 in Norway
  - Density: 10.3/km^{2} (27/sq mi)
  - Change (10 years): ▲ +4.6%
- Demonym: Sunnfjording

Official language
  - Norwegian form: Nynorsk
- Time zone: UTC+01:00 (CET)
  - Summer (DST): UTC+02:00 (CEST)
- ISO 3166 code: NO-4647
- Website: Official website

Sunnfjord is a municipality in Vestland county, Norway. It is located in the traditional district of Sunnfjord. The administrative centre of the municipality is the town of Førde. Other villages in the municipality include Naustdal, Sande, Vassenden, and Skei.

The 2,208-square-kilometre (853 sq mi) municipality is the 27th largest by area out of the 357 municipalities in Norway. Sunnfjord Municipality is the 56th most populous municipality in Norway with a population of 22,662. The municipality's population density is 10.3 inhabitants per square kilometre (27/sq mi) and its population has increased by 4.6% over the previous 10-year period.

== General information ==
The municipality was established on 1 January 2020 when a large municipal merger took place combining Førde Municipality, Gaular Municipality, Jølster Municipality, and Naustdal Municipality.

=== Name ===
The municipality was named after the traditional district of Sunnfjord, in which it is located. The first element is sunn which means "southern". The last element is fjord which means "fjord", thus it is the southern fjord region (as opposed to the nearby Nordfjord region (the northern fjord region).

=== Coat of arms ===
The coat of arms was granted in 2019 for use starting on 1 January 2020 when the municipality was established. The arms have a dark green field (background) and the charge is four small vertical stripes meeting in the centre with one large vertical stripe. The charge has a tincture of argent which means it is commonly colored white, but if it is made out of metal, then silver is used. The arms symbolize four rivers joining a larger body of water. The rivers symbolize the four main rivers of Sunnfjord: Nausta, Gaula, Anga, and Jølstra all flowing in to a large fjord. It was also meant to symbolize the many waterfalls and rivers in the municipality as well as strength and unity.

=== Churches ===
The Church of Norway has six parishes (sokn) within Sunnfjord Municipality. It is part of the Sunnfjord prosti (deanery) in the Diocese of Bjørgvin.

Churches in Sunnfjord Municipality
Parish (sokn)	Church name	Location of the church	Year built
Førde	Førde Church	Førde	1885
Gaular	Bygstad Church	Bygstad	1845
Gaular	Sande Church	Sande	1864
Gaular	Hestad Chapel	Hestad	1805
Gaular	Viksdalen Church	Vik	1848
Helgheim	Helgheim Church	Helgheim	1877
Holsen og Haukedalen	Haukedalen Church	Haukedalen	1885
Holsen og Haukedalen	Holsen Church	Holsen	1861
Naustdal	Naustdal Church	Naustdal	1891
Naustdal	Vevring Church	Vevring	1846
Ålhus	Vassenden Church	Vassenden	2002
Ålhus	Ålhus Church	Ålhus	1795

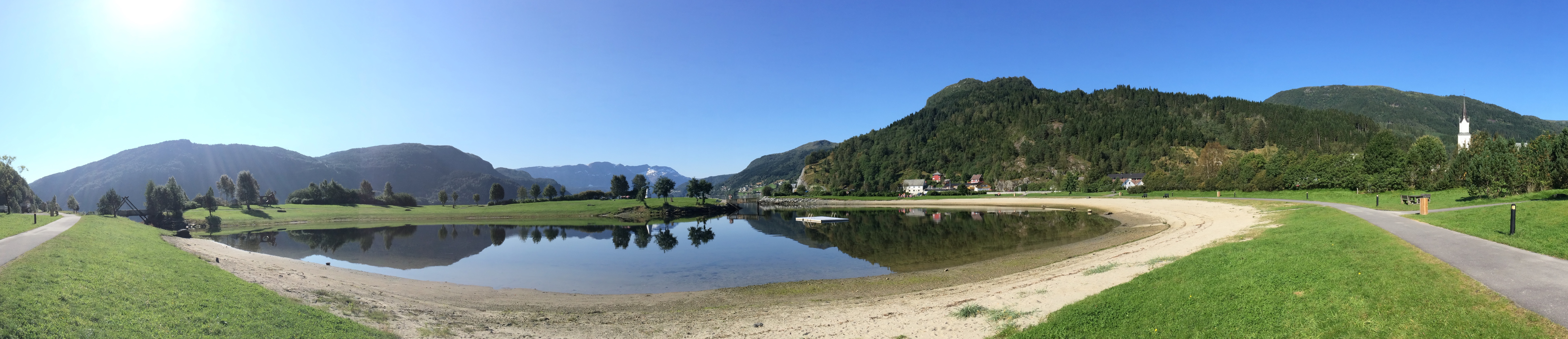
Beach near Naustdal in Sunnfjord Municipality

== Government ==
Sunnfjord Municipality is responsible for primary education (through 10th grade), outpatient health services, senior citizen services, welfare and other social services, zoning, economic development, and municipal roads and utilities. The municipality is governed by a municipal council of directly elected representatives. The mayor is indirectly elected by a vote of the municipal council. The municipality is under the jurisdiction of the Sogn og Fjordane District Court and the Gulating Court of Appeal.

=== Municipal council ===
The municipal council (Kommunestyre) of Sunnfjord Municipality is made up of 37 representatives that are elected to four-year terms. The tables below show the current and historical composition of the council by political party.

Sunnfjord kommunestyre 2023–2027
Party name (in Nynorsk)	Number of representatives
Labour Party (Arbeidarpartiet)	8
Progress Party (Framstegspartiet)	2
Green Party (Miljøpartiet Dei Grøne)	1
Conservative Party (Høgre)	6
Industry and Business Party (Industri‑ og Næringspartiet)	2
Christian Democratic Party (Kristeleg Folkeparti)	1
Centre Party (Senterpartiet)	8
Socialist Left Party (Sosialistisk Venstreparti)	5
Liberal Party (Venstre)	4
Total number of members:	37

Sunnfjord kommunestyre 2020–2023
Party name (in Nynorsk)	Number of representatives
Labour Party (Arbeidarpartiet)	11
Progress Party (Framstegspartiet)	1
Green Party (Miljøpartiet Dei Grøne)	2
Conservative Party (Høgre)	10
Christian Democratic Party (Kristeleg Folkeparti)	2
Red Party (Raudt)	1
Centre Party (Senterpartiet)	12
Socialist Left Party (Sosialistisk Venstreparti)	4
Liberal Party (Venstre)	2
Total number of members:	45
Note: On 1 January 2020, Førde Municipality, Gaular Municipality, Jølster Municipality, and Naustdal Municipality were merged to form the new Sunnfjord Municipality.

=== Mayors ===
The mayor (Nynorsk: ordførar) of Sunnfjord Municipality is the political leader of the municipality and the chairperson of the municipal council. Here is a list of people who have held this position:

- 2020–2021: Olve Grotle (H)
- 2021–present: Jenny Ellaug Følling (Sp)

== Geography ==
The municipality makes up a large part of the traditional district of Sunnfjord. It surrounds the inner parts of the Førdefjorden and Dalsfjorden, plus the areas surrounding the Jølstravatnet all the way to the Jostedal Glacier. The highest point in the municipality is the 1,826.43-metre (5,992.2 ft) tall mountain Snønipa, located on the northeastern border with Gloppen Municipality.

Kinn Municipality lies to the northwest, Gloppen Municipality lies to the north, Stryn Municipality lies to the northeast, Luster Municipality lies to the east, Sogndal Municipality lies to the southeast, Høyanger Municipality lies to the south, Fjaler Municipality lies to the southwest, and Askvoll Municipality lies to the west.

== Climate ==
Situated slightly inland and along the innermost part of a narrow fjord, Sunnfjord's climate is somewhat colder in winter than places along the outer coast, but also with slightly warmer summer days. The same principle also holds within the municipality itself. Villages along the fjord such as Førde and Naustdal have milder winters, but slightly cooler summers than those further inland.

Førde is one of Norway's wettest towns. The wettest season is autumn and winter with December as wettest month. The driest season is late spring and summer with May as the driest month. The climate data for Førde is consistent with an oceanic climate with the original Köppen climate threshold of −3 °C (27 °F) (using the 0 °C (32 °F) threshold for coldest month as in the United States, Førde would be classified as a humid continental climate). The all-time high is 32.5 °C (90.5 °F) recorded 16 July 2003. The all-time low is −21 °C (−6 °F).

Villages further inland, such as Skei receive less precipitation than those along the fjords as a result of the mountainous terrain. Here the yearly average precipitation is around 1900mm. The wettest regions in the municipality are the upper parts of the Angedal and Naustdal valleys. Here the average yearly precipitation is around 2800mm. In these parts there is usually significant snow accumulation during the winter. Snow depths over 1 meter are not uncommon, while it can be free of snow along the fjord.

Climate data for Førde – Tefre 1991–2020 (64 m)
Month	Jan	Feb	Mar	Apr	May	Jun	Jul	Aug	Sep	Oct	Nov	Dec	Year
Mean daily maximum °C (°F)	2.5 (36.5)	2.6 (36.7)	5.4 (41.7)	10 (50)	14.5 (58.1)	17.7 (63.9)	20.1 (68.2)	19.4 (66.9)	15.5 (59.9)	10.1 (50.2)	5.3 (41.5)	2.6 (36.7)	10.5 (50.9)
Daily mean °C (°F)	−0.3 (31.5)	−0.7 (30.7)	1.5 (34.7)	5.2 (41.4)	9.2 (48.6)	12.7 (54.9)	14.9 (58.8)	14.3 (57.7)	10.8 (51.4)	6.1 (43.0)	2.4 (36.3)	−0.1 (31.8)	6.3 (43.4)
Mean daily minimum °C (°F)	−3 (27)	−3.5 (25.7)	−1.8 (28.8)	1 (34)	4.3 (39.7)	8 (46)	11 (52)	10.6 (51.1)	7.6 (45.7)	3.5 (38.3)	0 (32)	−3 (27)	2.9 (37.3)
Average precipitation mm (inches)	250.1 (9.85)	221.3 (8.71)	209.4 (8.24)	121.4 (4.78)	103.7 (4.08)	118.4 (4.66)	135.4 (5.33)	141.8 (5.58)	205.8 (8.10)	230.9 (9.09)	255.2 (10.05)	288.1 (11.34)	2,281.5 (89.81)
Average precipitation days (≥ 1.0 mm)	21	19	21	18	18	19	20	20	20	22	21	22	241
Source: NOAA WMO averages 91-2020 Norway

Climate data for Botnen i Førde 1991–2020 (237 m)
Month	Jan	Feb	Mar	Apr	May	Jun	Jul	Aug	Sep	Oct	Nov	Dec	Year
Average precipitation mm (inches)	314.3 (12.37)	276.6 (10.89)	251.5 (9.90)	157.1 (6.19)	137.2 (5.40)	146.4 (5.76)	168.1 (6.62)	195.1 (7.68)	281.8 (11.09)	275.1 (10.83)	290.0 (11.42)	332.1 (13.07)	2,825.3 (111.23)
Average precipitation days (≥ 1.0 mm)	19	17	18	13	13	15	17	18	17	18	17	19	201
Source: NOAA WMO averages 91-2020 Norway

Climate data for Skei i Jøster 1991–2020 (205 m)
Month	Jan	Feb	Mar	Apr	May	Jun	Jul	Aug	Sep	Oct	Nov	Dec	Year
Average precipitation mm (inches)	205.6 (8.09)	182.9 (7.20)	166.2 (6.54)	101.5 (4.00)	91.2 (3.59)	100.0 (3.94)	110.5 (4.35)	137.2 (5.40)	190.7 (7.51)	181.6 (7.15)	192.5 (7.58)	225.5 (8.88)	1,885.4 (74.23)
Average precipitation days (≥ 1.0 mm)	17	16	16	12	12	13	15	17	16	16	15	18	183
Source: NOAA WMO averages 91-2020 Norway

== Notable people ==
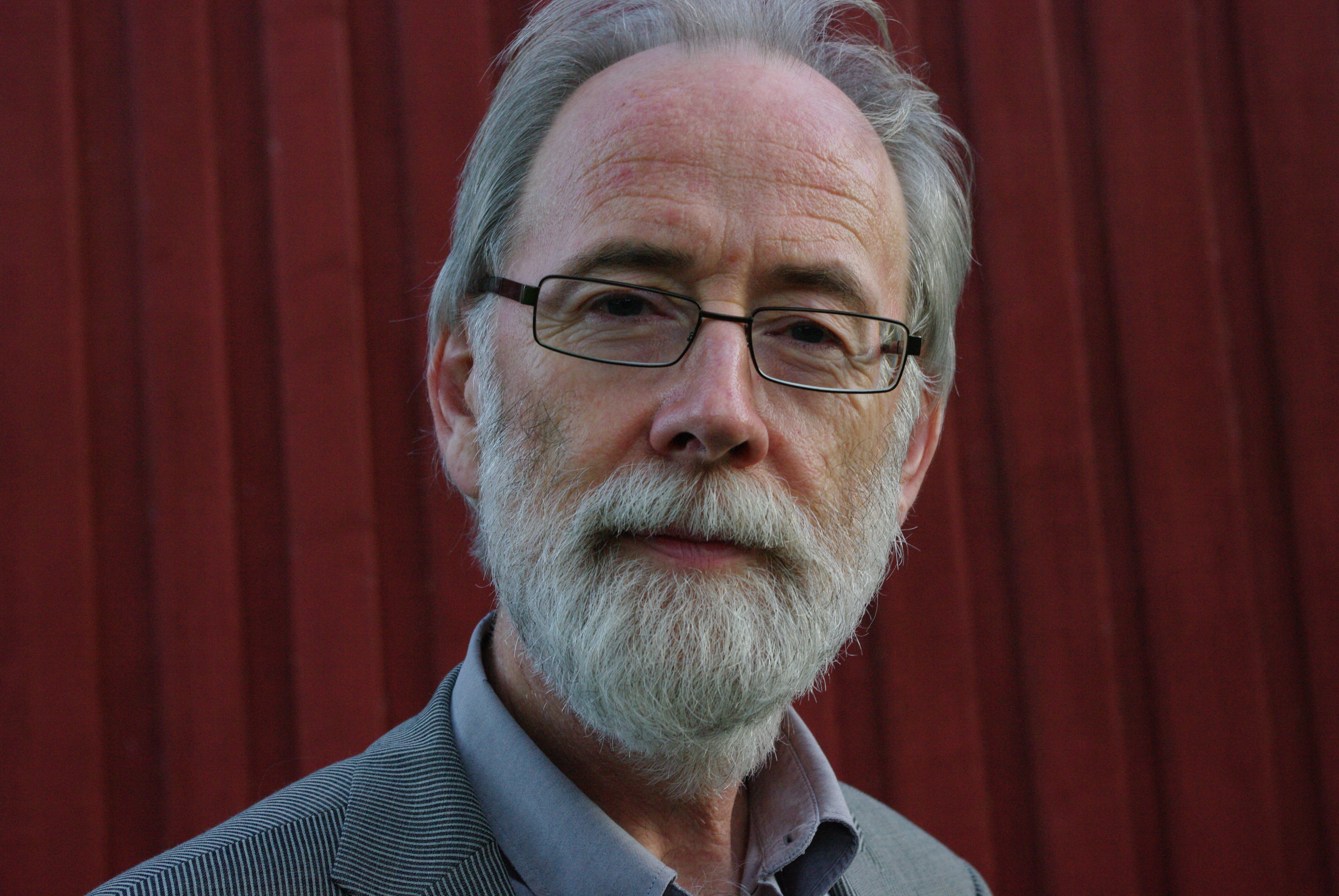
Arild Stubhaug, 2009

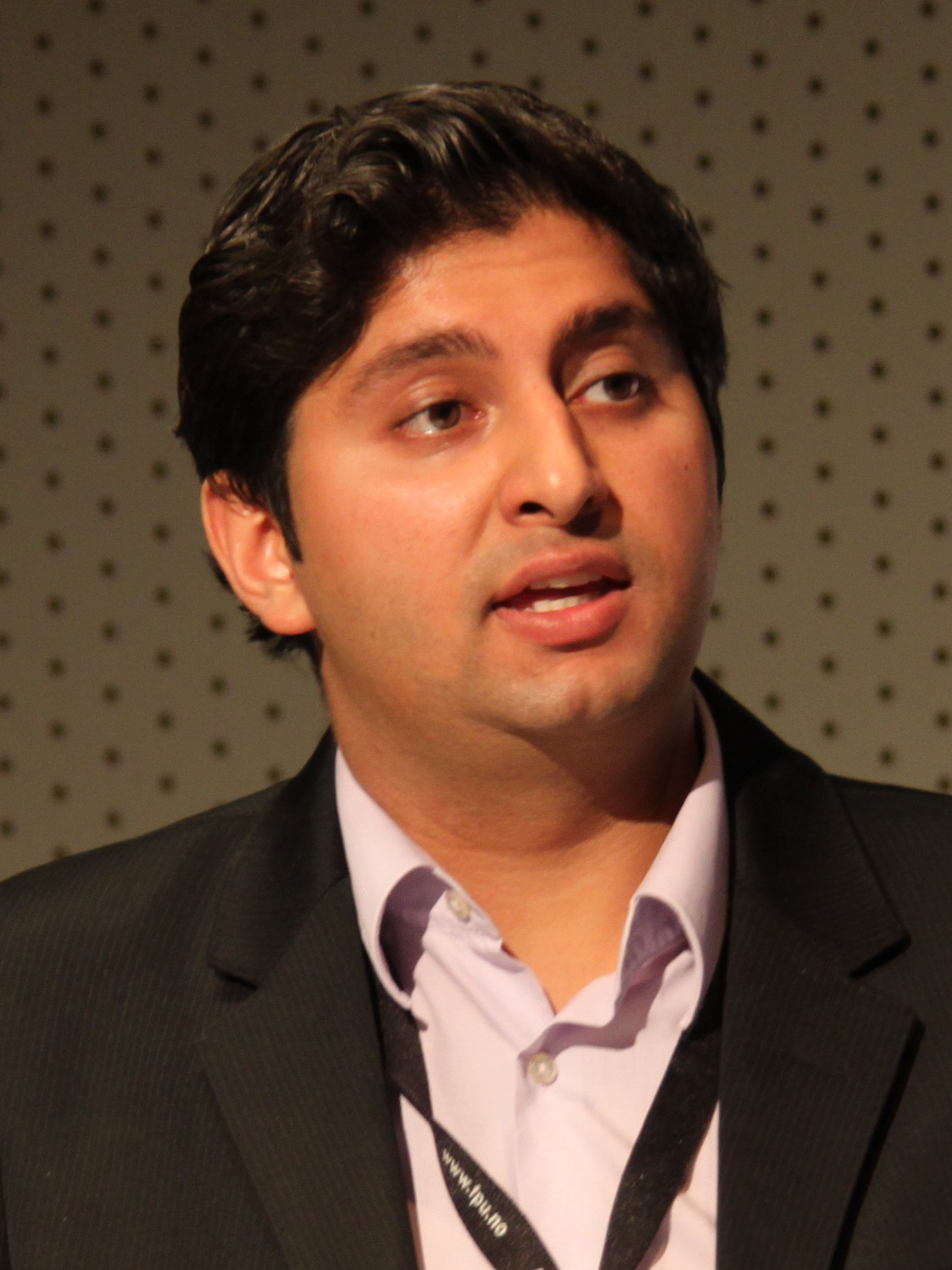
Himanshu Gulati, 2012

=== Public service ===
- Kolbeinn hrúga, a 12th-century Norse chieftain in Orkney who was born in Sunnfjord and is part of the Orkneyinga saga
- Audun Hugleiksson (ca.1240–1302), a Norwegian nobleman who grew up in Jølster
- Brita Alvern, a woman who was accused of witchcraft and put on trial at the Indredale Skipreide in Sunnfjord in 1729
- John P. Munson (1860 in Jølster – 1928), a Norwegian-American zoologist and academic
- Ingolf Elster Christensen (1872 in Førde – 1943), a jurist, military officer, and politician
- Nikolai Andreas Schei (1901–1985) & Andreas Olai Schei (1902–1989), jurists and civil servants from Førde
- Leiv Erdal (1915 in Naustdal – 2009), a military officer, bailiff, and politician
- Åsmund Reikvam (born 1944 in Førde), a professor in medicine and former politician
- Arild Stubhaug (born 1948 in Naustdal), a mathematician, poet, and biographer
- Anlaug Amanda Djupvik (born ca.1965 in Førde), an astronomer of star formation and initial mass function
- Bård Vegar Solhjell (born 1971), a former politician and minister who grew up in Sunnfjord
- Sigbjørn Gjelsvik (born 1974 in Naustdal), a member of the Cabinet of Norway
- Himanshu Gulati (born 1988 in Førde), a Norwegian politician

=== The arts ===
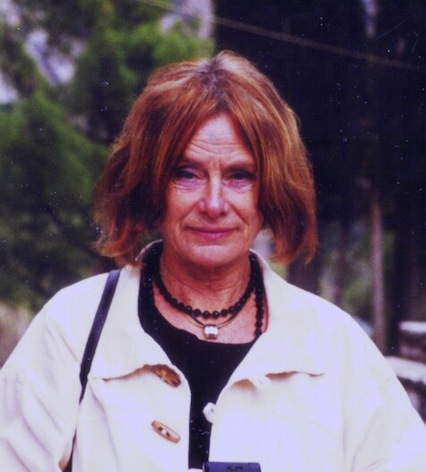
Eldrid Lunden, 2000

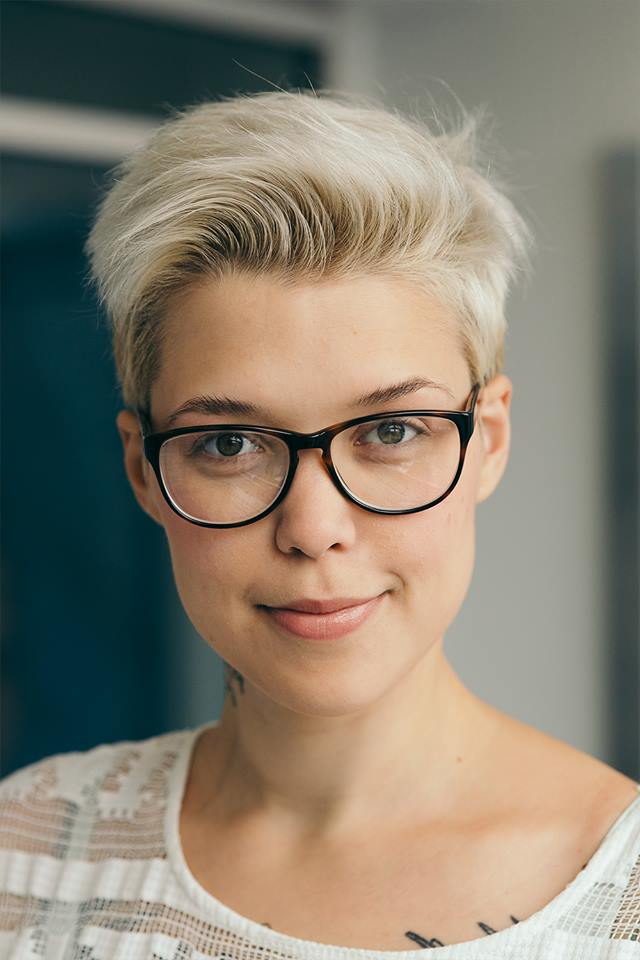
Marianne Clementine Håheim, 2016

- Anders Askevold (1834 in Askvoll – 1900), a painter of landscapes and animals
- Johannes Haarklou (1847 in Haukedalen – 1925), a composer, organist, conductor, and music critic
- Hauk Aabel (1869 in Førde – 1961), a comedian and actor in Norwegian and Swedish silent films
- Hjalmar Christensen (1869 in Sunnfjord – 1925), a writer and prominent literary critic
- Helene Bergsholm (born 1992 in Førde), an actress
- Ludvig Eikaas (1920 in Jølster – 2010), a painter, graphic artist, and sculptor
- Gunnar S. Gundersen (1921 in Førde – 1983), a modernist painter known as Gunnar S
- Eldrid Lunden (born 1940 in Naustdal), a poet and Norway's first professor of creative writing
- Arve Furset (born 1964 in Askvoll), a composer, jazz musician, and music producer
- Ole Jonny Eikefjord (born 1970 in Førde), a chef, cookbook author, and restaurateur
- Kristian Eivind Espedal (born 1975 in Sunnfjord), a black metal vocalist, musician, and painter whose stage name is Gaahl
- Gunnar Garfors (born 1975), a traveler, author, media professional, and public speaker who grew up in Naustdal
- Olaug Nilssen (born 1977 in Førde), a novelist, playwright, children's writer, and magazine editor
- Marianne Clementine Håheim (born 1987 in Jølster), an author
- Thea Hjelmeland (born 1987 in Førde), a musician, singer, and songwriter
- Iselin Solheim (born 1990 in Naustdal), a singer and songwriter
- Peter Førde (born 1988 in Førde), an actor

=== Sport ===
- Håkon Fimland (1942 in Naustdal – 2016), a hurdler and Norwegian politician
- Martinus Grov (born 1974 in Førde), a retired archer who competed at the 1992, 1996 and 2000 Summer Olympics
- Asgeir Årdal (born 1983 in Jølster), a cross-country skier who lives in Skei

== Gallery ==
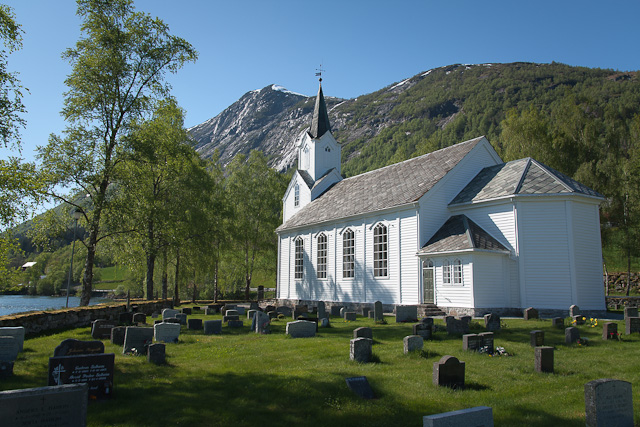
Helgheim Church in Jølster

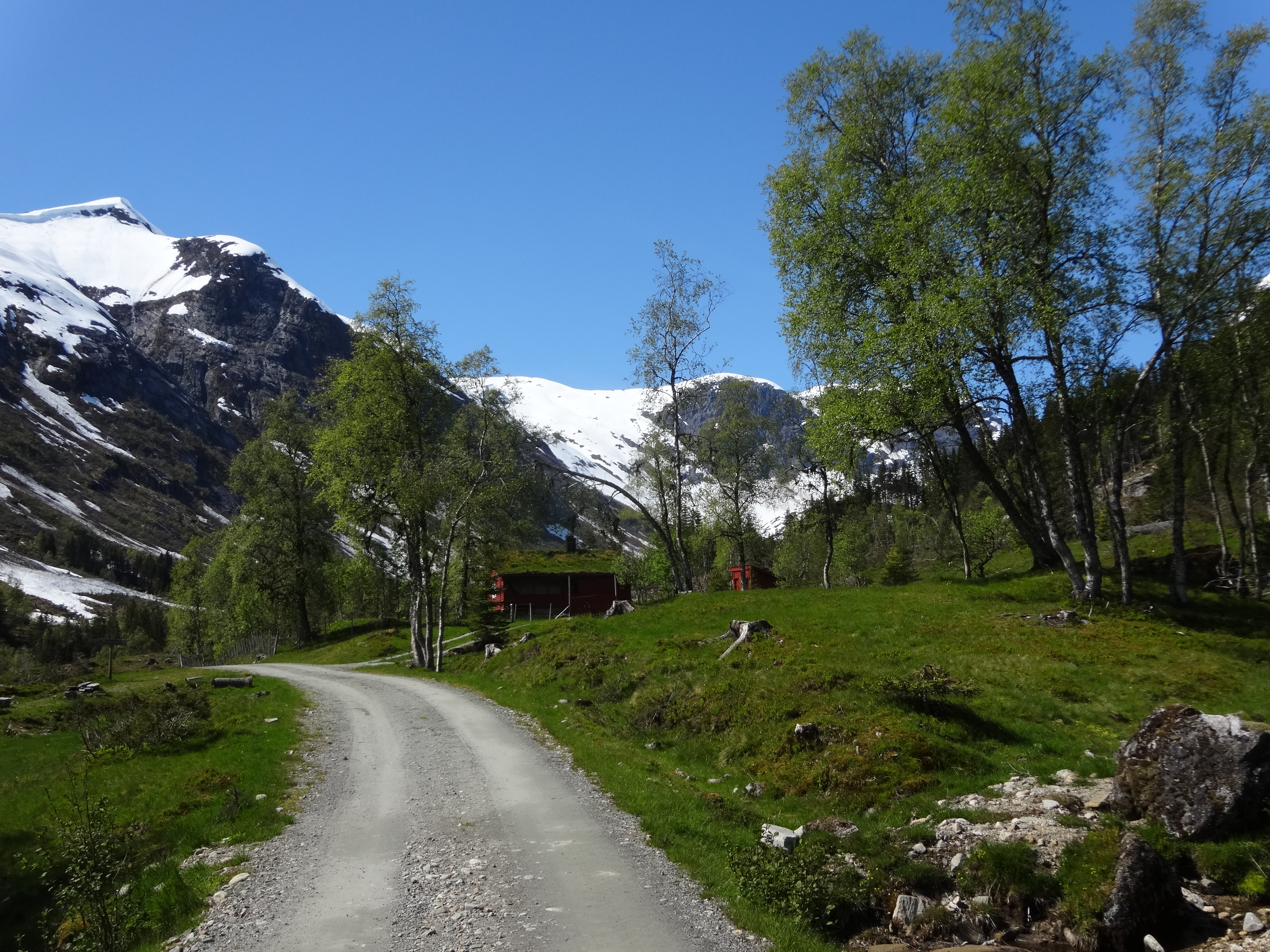
At the Daleelva at Årdal

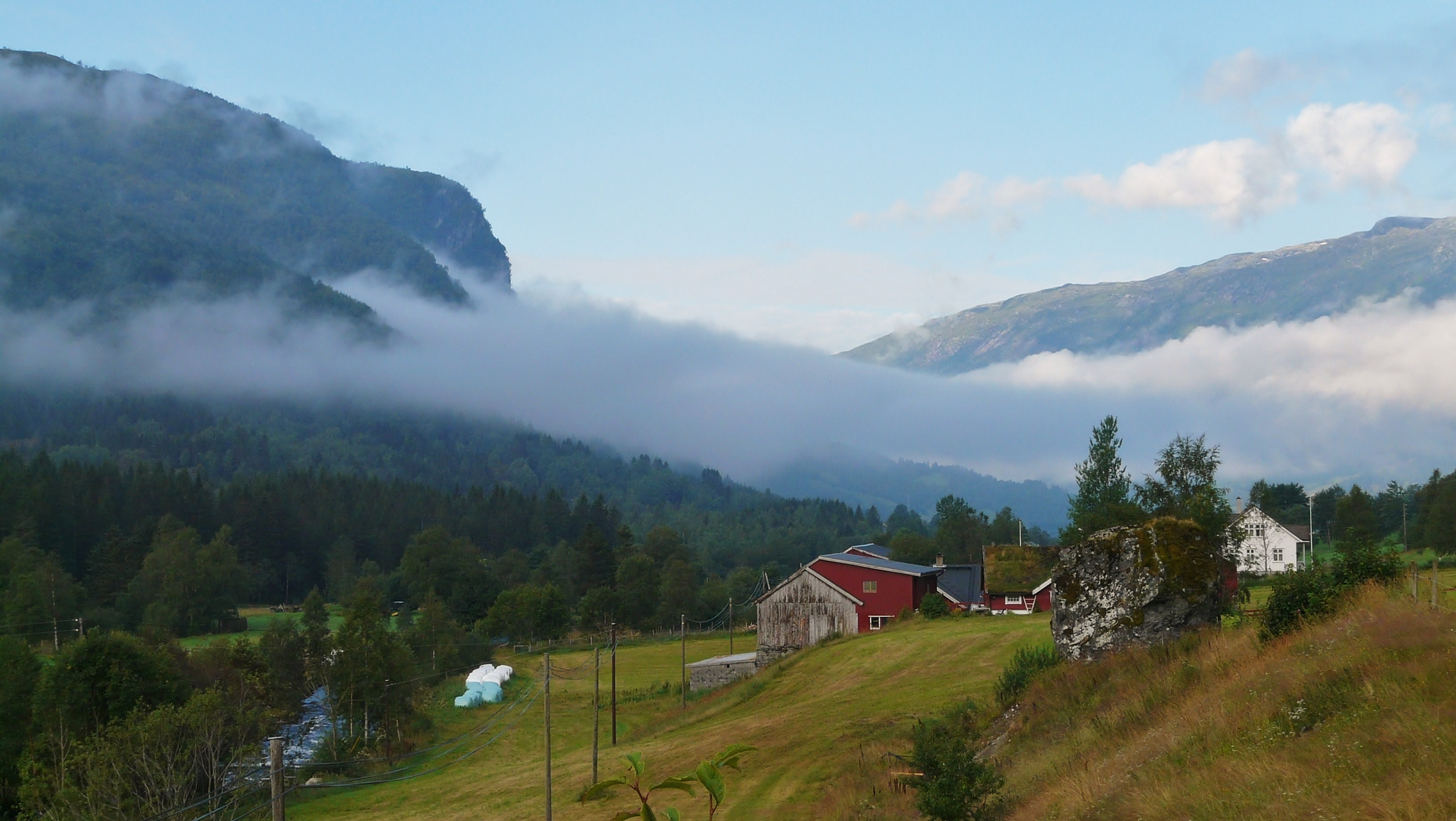
Råeimsdalen from Viksdalen near Vallestadfossen

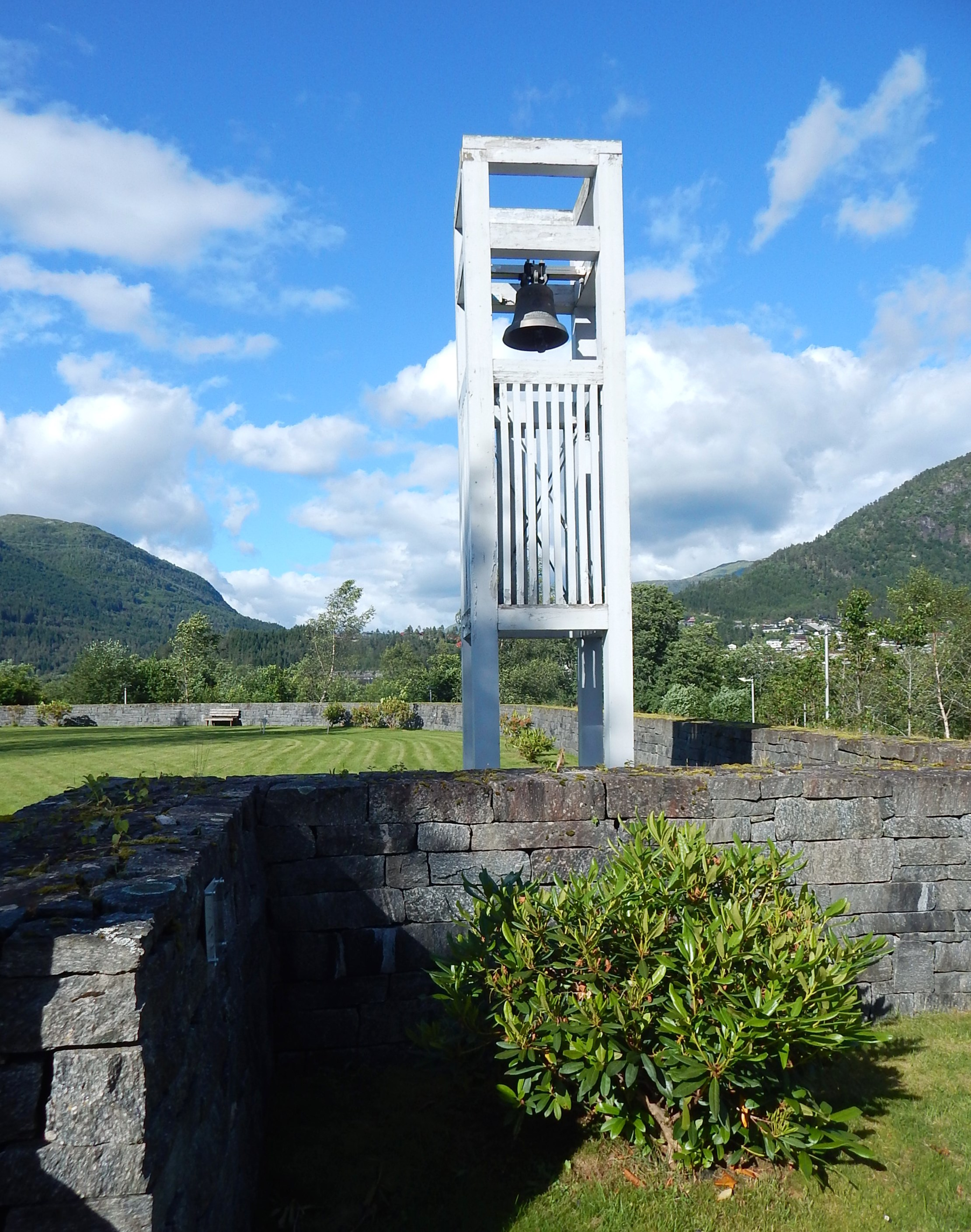
Blomreina cemetery in Førde
