= Nils S. Dvergsdal =

Norwegian politician

Nils Samuelson Dvergsdal (1842–1921) was a Norwegian politician.

He served as a deputy representative to the Norwegian Parliament between 1895 and 1900, representing the constituency of Nordre Bergenhus Amt and the Moderate Liberal Party. On the local level he was a farmer, mayor of Jølster Municipality and a member of the board of the Fylkesbaatane transport company.
