= Jølstra =

River in Vestland, Norway

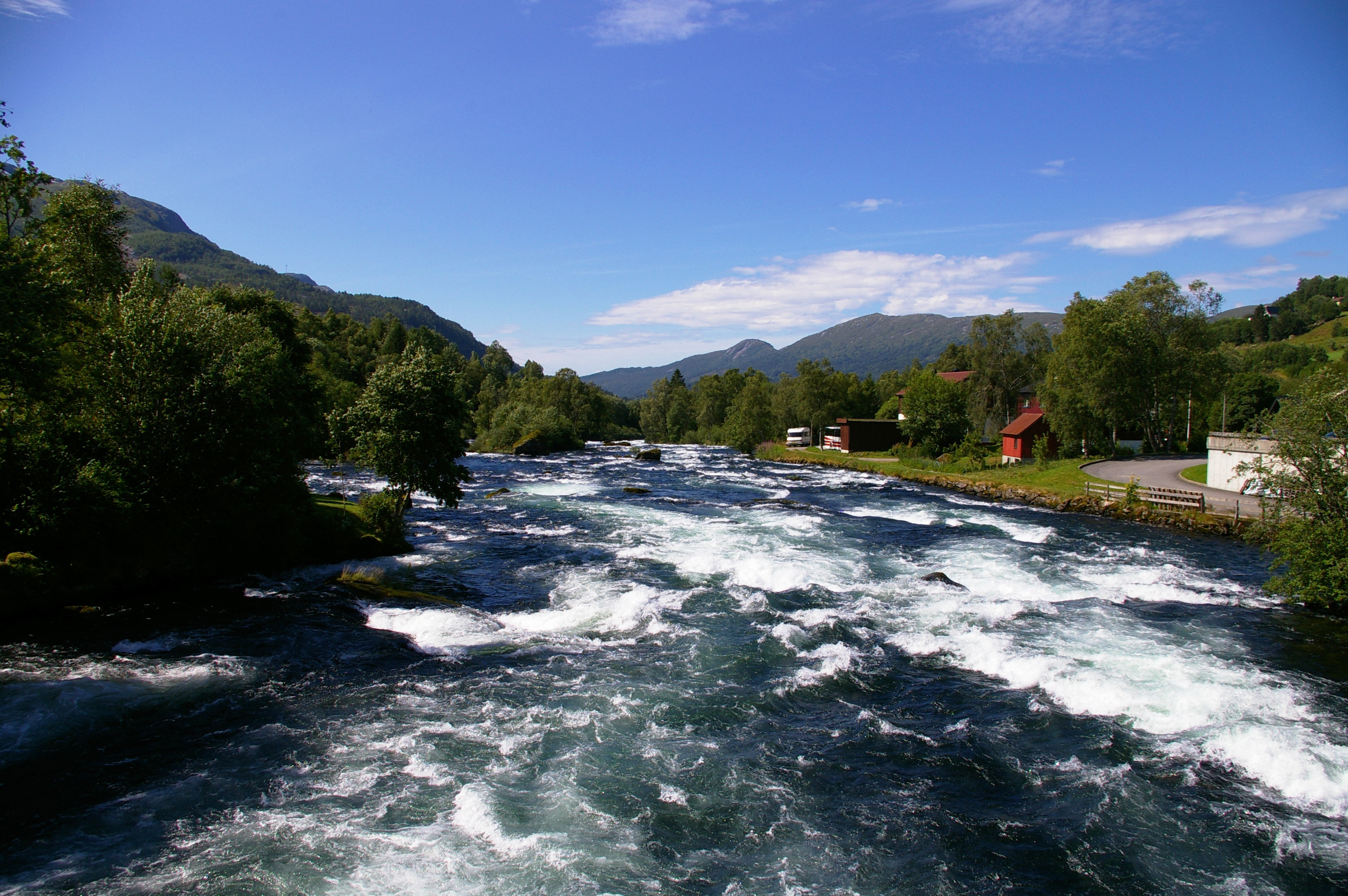
- The Jølstra River at Vassenden in Jølster

Location
- Country: Norway
- County: Vestland
- Municipality: Sunnfjord Municipality

Physical characteristics
- Source: Jølstravatnet
  - location: Vassenden, Norway
  - coordinates: 61.49247°N 6.113870°E
  - elevation: 207 metres (679 ft)
- Mouth: Førdefjorden
  - location: Førde, Norway
  - coordinates: 61.45917°N 5.829577°E
  - elevation: 0 metres (0 ft)
- Length: 22 km (14 mi)
- Discharge
  - average: 43.9 m^{3}/s (1,550 cu ft/s)

Jølstra is a river in Sunnfjord Municipality in Vestland county, Norway. The 22-kilometre (14 mi) long river flows from the lake of Jølstravatnet (at an elevation of 207 metres (679 ft) above sea level) down to the Førdefjorden (which is at sea level). The river begins at the village of Vassenden, on the shores of the lake, it then goes past the village of Langhaugane, then past the Moskog area of Førde, past the village of Bruland, and it finally flows to its mouth at the town of Førde, on the shores of the fjord.

There are four hydroelectric power stations in the river. The average rate of flow in Jølstra is given as 43.9 cubic metres per second (1,550 cu ft/s), measured at Høgset over the period from 1993 to 2011. The highest recorded flow rate during this period was 256 cubic metres per second (9,000 cu ft/s), while the lowest recorded flow rate was 1.2 cubic metres per second (42 cu ft/s).

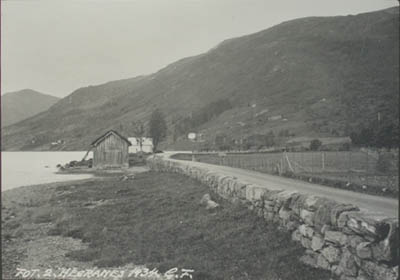
An early photo of Lake Jølstravatn, taken in 1934.

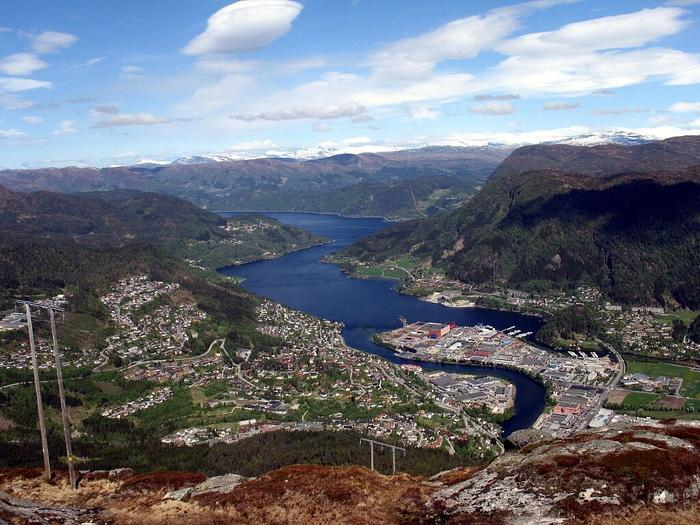
The Jølstra flowing through Havstadfjellet.

== Fishing ==
The lower sections of the Jølstra are rich in salmon and sea trout. Although the salmon species have been protected by law since 1992, the authorities open the river for fishing for a brief period every year. The fishing window usually begins in mid-July of each year and lasts until the end of August. There are also natural barriers to fishing on the Jølstra. The river is a fast flowing one, so fishing is not safe or suitable everywhere. One of the best fishing areas on the river is where the waters from the lake Jølstravatnet flow out into it.
