= Marianne Clementine Håheim =

Norwegian writer (born 1987)

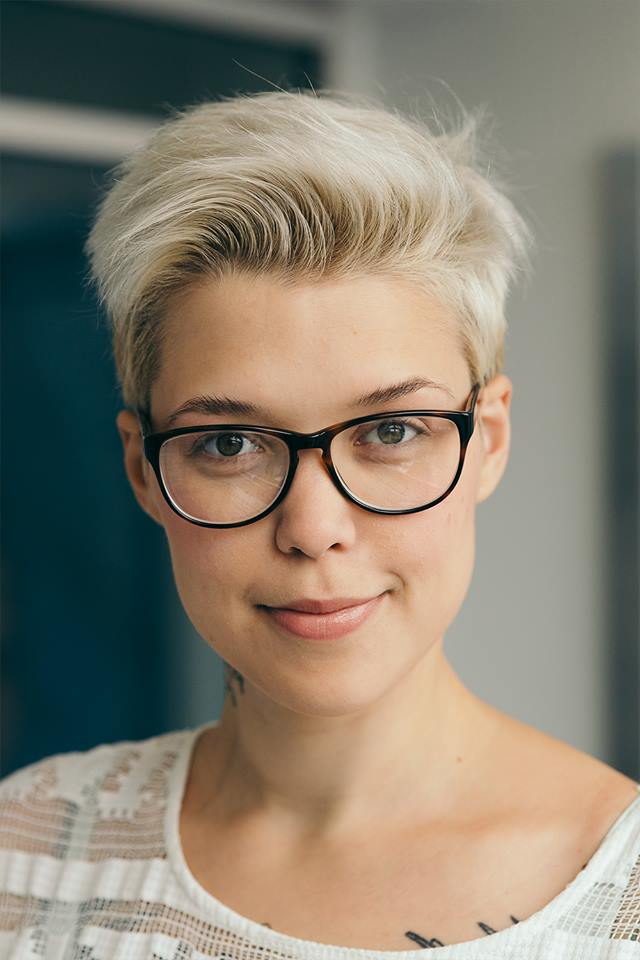
Håheim in 2016

Marianne Clementine Håheim (born 21 August 1987) is a Norwegian author. In 2017, she won the Norwegian Booksellers Association's author award Bjørnsonstipendet, in collaboration with the Norwegian Authors' Union.

A native of Jølster Municipality in Sogn og Fjordane, Håheim made her debut with the poetry collection Bilydar, released in 2012. Her first novel, Svart belte, was published in October 2015. The novel won her the 2017 Bjørnsonstipendet.

== Bibliography ==
- Bilydar (2012; collection of poems)
- Svart belte (2015; novel)
- Plikt (2021; novel)
