= Audun Hugleiksson =

Norwegian nobleman

- Baron
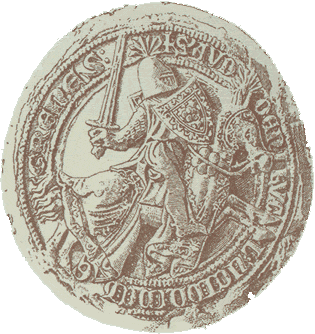
- Born: 1240
- Died: 2 December 1302 (aged 61–62)
- Noble family: Hestakorn
- Father: Hugleik
- Occupation: Politician and lawman

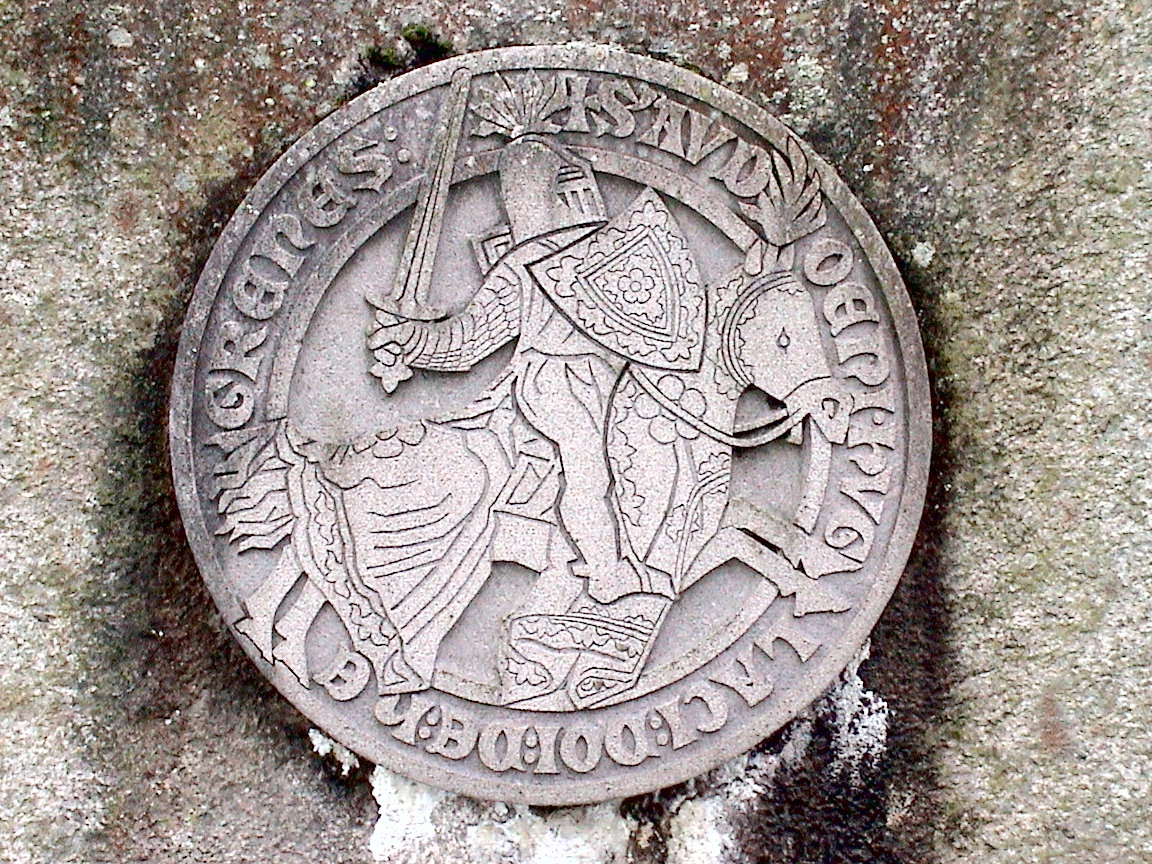
The seal can also be seen on a memorial close to the community house Borgja on Ålhus in Jølster

Audun Hugleiksson (Hestakorn) (c. 1240 – 2 December 1302) was a Norwegian nobleman at the end of the 13th century. He was the king's right hand, both under King Magnus Lagabøte and King Eirik Magnusson. He was seen as an important politician and lawman in his time and played a central role in reforming the Norwegian law system.

== Biography ==
Audun Hugleiksson grew up on the farm Hegranes on Ålhus (a village in the present-day Sunnfjord Municipality) which lies in what was the area of Firdafylke, (east of Førde and north of the Sognefjord). His father Hugleik seems to have been a lower nobleman and a member of King Håkon Håkonsson's hird (1204–1263). Hugleik himself probably did not himself have a very prominent position, but was still married to a woman of high standing from the east of Norway. Audun's mother was most likely the daughter of Audun i Borg (now Sarpsborg). Audun could then have traced a common lineage to Inga of Varteig (1185–1234), mother of King Håkon Håkonsson.

Audun Hugleiksson was initially taught at the Bergen Cathedral School. His education was continued in Paris, France and Bologna, Italy. Upon his return to Norway, he was engaged in the revisions which resulted in Magnus Lagabøte's national law (Magnus Lagabøtes landslov). From 1280 and onwards he was given increasingly important roles in the government of Norway and its foreign policy. He had his own seat on the king's council, was a lawyer (stallare), tax minister (fehirde) and held the title of a baron.

Between 1276 and 1286, Audun Hugleiksson erected a castle or fortress called Audunborg on Ålhus in Jølster in Sunnfjord.

== See also ==
- Alv Erlingsson

== Related Literature ==
- Nedrebø, Yngve (2002) Audun Hugleiksson – frå kongens råd til galgen (Førde: Selja forlag) ISBN 82-91722-25-0
- Knut Helle. «Audun Hugleiksson». I: Norsk biografisk leksikon, bd 1. 2. utg. 1999 (Med fyldig litteraturliste)
