= Vassenden Church =

Church in Vestland, Norway

- Vassenden kyrkje
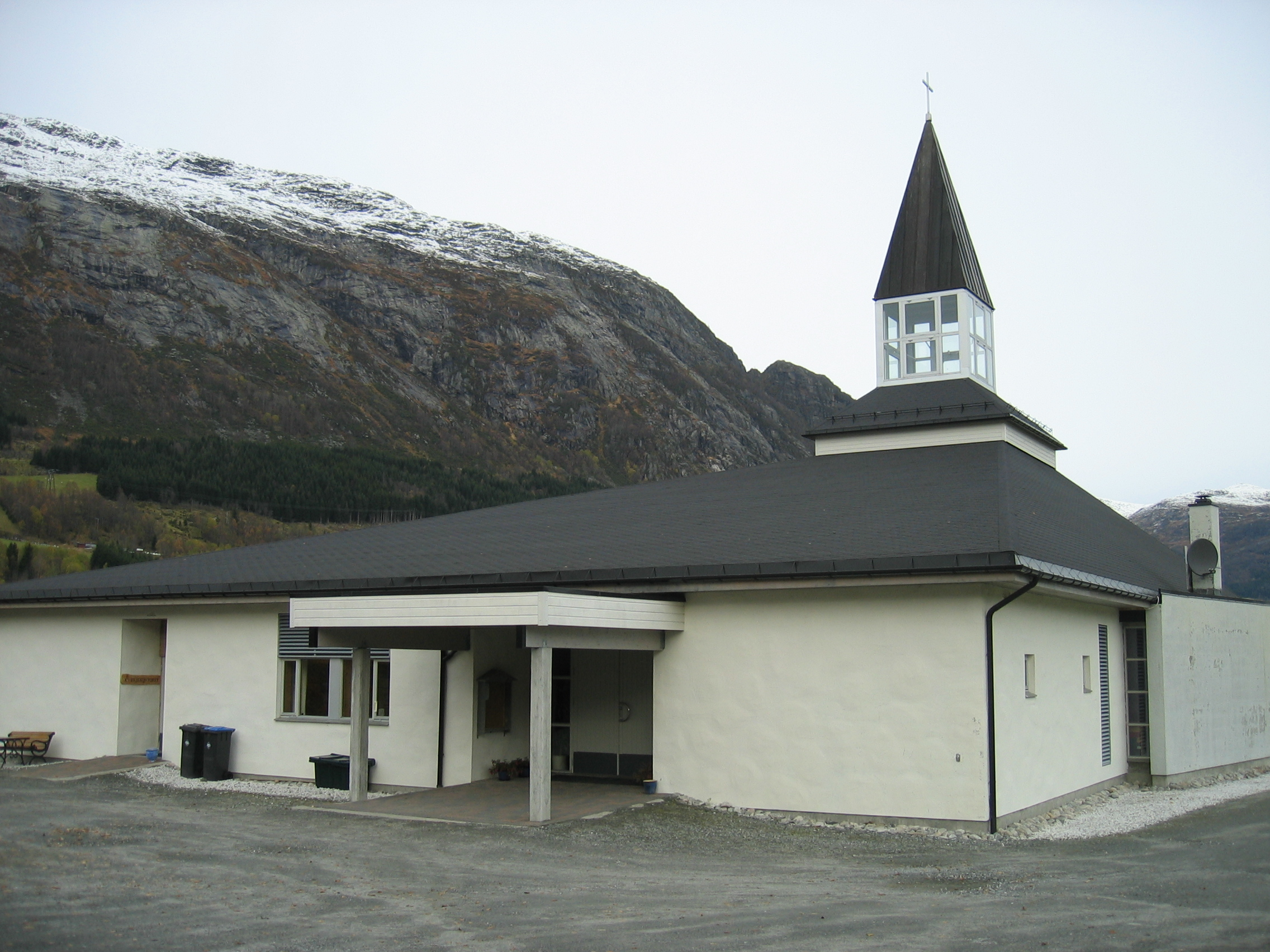
- View of the church
- Vassenden Church
- 61°29′26″N 6°06′52″E
- Location: Sunnfjord Municipality, Vestland
- Country: Norway
- Denomination: Church of Norway
- Churchmanship: Evangelical Lutheran

History
- Status: Chapel
- Founded: 2002
- Consecrated: 22 Sept 2002

Architecture
- Functional status: Active
- Architect: Per W. Skarstein
- Architectural type: Fan-shaped
- Completed: 2002 (24 years ago)

Specifications
- Capacity: 400
- Materials: Concrete

Administration
- Diocese: Bjørgvin bispedømme
- Deanery: Sunnfjord prosti
- Parish: Ålhus

Vassenden Church (Norwegian: Vassenden kyrkje) is a chapel of the Church of Norway in Sunnfjord Municipality in Vestland county, Norway. It is located in the village of Vassenden. It is an annex chapel for the Ålhus parish which is part of the Sunnfjord prosti (deanery) in the Diocese of Bjørgvin. The white, concrete church building was built in a modern, fan-shaped design in 2002 by the architect Per W. Skarstein. The chapel seats about 400 people.

== History ==
As early as the 1920s, the people of Vassenden were desiring a church of their own in their village. In 1930, a cemetery was built in Vassenden, but no church. Finally, by the year 2000, financing was finally in place and approval for a church was given. Per W. Skarstein was hired as the architect and Karl Russøy was the lead builder. The modern-style church has a floor space of about 800 square metres (8,600 sq ft). The sanctuary has adjoining side rooms with walls that can be moved to make the main room larger. The church was completed and formally consecrated on 22 September 2002 by the Bishop Ole Hagesæther.

== See also ==
- List of churches in Bjørgvin
