= Vassenden =

Village in Sunnfjord Municipality, Norway

Vassenden Nedre Vassenden
- Village
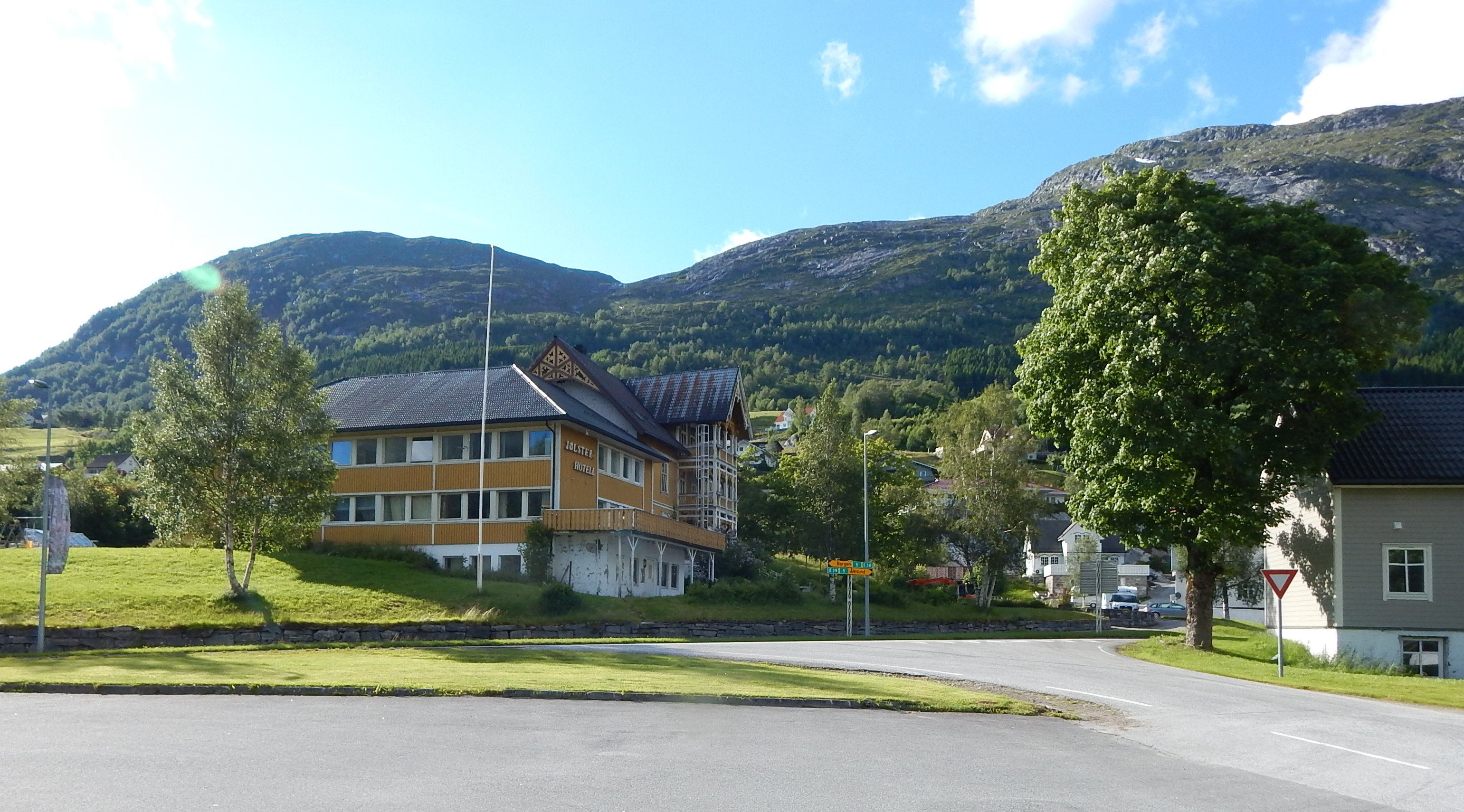
- Interactive map of Vassenden
- Location within Vestland Location within Norway
- Coordinates: 61.49301°N 6.11278°E
- Country: Norway
- Region: Western Norway
- County: Vestland
- District: Sunnfjord
- Municipality: Sunnfjord Municipality

Area
  - Total: 0.39 km^{2} (0.15 sq mi)
- Elevation: 210 m (690 ft)

Population (2025)
  - Total: 327
  - Density: 838/km^{2} (2,170/sq mi)
- Time zone: UTC+01:00 (CET)
  - Summer (DST): UTC+02:00 (CEST)
- Post Code: 6847 Vassenden

Vassenden is a village in Sunnfjord Municipality in Vestland county, Norway. It is located along the river Jølstra on the western shore of the lake Jølstravatnet, and about 10 kilometres (6.2 mi) north of the lake Holsavatnet.

The 0.39-square-kilometre (96-acre) village has a population (2025) of 327 and a population density of 838 inhabitants per square kilometre (2,170/sq mi).

The village is located along the European route E39 highway, just about 2.5 kilometres (1.6 mi) east of the village of Langhaugane. The village of Ålhus lies about 9 kilometres (5.6 mi) to the northeast. The village of Skei is 25 kilometres (16 mi) to the northeast, at the other end of the lake Jølstravatnet. Vassenden Church was built in 2002 to serve the people of Vassenden and the surrounding areas.
