= Gerd Dvergsdal =

Norwegian politician

Gerd Dvergsdal (born 18 July 1946) is a Norwegian politician for the Centre Party.

She served as a deputy representative to the Norwegian Parliament from Sogn og Fjordane during the term 2001–2005.

On the local level she was mayor of Jølster Municipality from 1995 to 2011. She is also a member of the board of the Western Norway Regional Health Authority.
