= Helgheim Church =

Church in Vestland, Norway

- Helgheim kyrkje
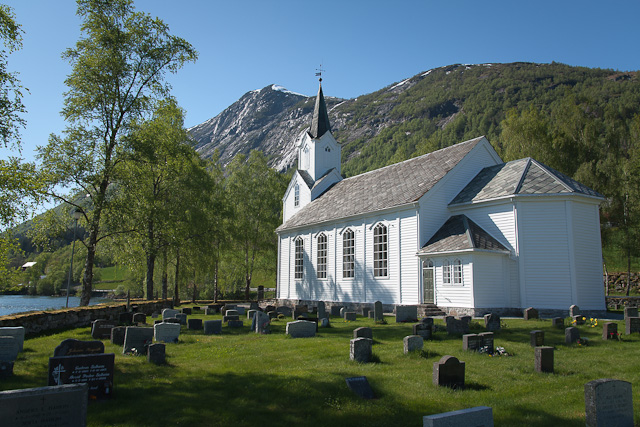
- View of the church
- Helgheim Church
- 61°33′38″N 6°24′00″E
- Location: Sunnfjord Municipality, Vestland
- Country: Norway
- Denomination: Church of Norway
- Previous denomination: Catholic Church
- Churchmanship: Evangelical Lutheran

History
- Status: Parish church
- Founded: 13th century
- Consecrated: 28 November 1877

Architecture
- Functional status: Active
- Architect: Jacob Wilhelm Nordan
- Architectural type: Long church
- Completed: 1877 (149 years ago)

Specifications
- Capacity: 500
- Materials: Wood

Administration
- Diocese: Bjørgvin bispedømme
- Deanery: Sunnfjord prosti
- Parish: Helgheim
- Norwegian Cultural Heritage Site
- Type: Church
- Status: Listed
- ID: 84529

Helgheim Church (Norwegian: Helgheim kyrkje) is a parish church of the Church of Norway in Sunnfjord Municipality in Vestland county, Norway. It is located in the village of Helgheim, right on the shore of the lake Jølstravatnet. It is the church for the Helgheim parish which is part of the Sunnfjord prosti (deanery) in the Diocese of Bjørgvin. The white, wooden church was built in a long church style in 1877 by the architect Jacob Wilhelm Nordan. The church seats about 500 people.

== History ==
The earliest existing historical records of the church date back to the year 1322, but the church was not new at that time. The first church at Helgheim was likely a wooden stave church that was built during the 13th century. The medieval church was torn down during the first half of the 1600s and replaced with a timber-framed long church, possibly built in stages over a number of years. In 1680, the church was described as having a nave that measured about 15.7 by 10.7 metres (52 ft × 35 ft), a choir that measured about 7 by 7 metres (23 ft × 23 ft), and a church porch that measured about 3 by 10.7 metres (9.8 ft × 35.1 ft).

By the 1870s, a new church was needed, so plans were made to replace the old church. The new church was designed by Jacob Wilhelm Nordan and built by builder Ole Vangberg. In 1876, construction of a new church was begun beside the old church (and slightly overlapping the footprint of the old building). The old church was torn down as the construction progressed. The new church was consecrated on 28 November 1877 by the Bishop Peter Hersleb Graah Birkeland. In 1952, a major renovation of the church was carried out. Part of this included removing the windows in the choir. The basic premise was that the bright light from the windows was distracting to the priest when facing the altar and it was hard to see the priest for the people in the nave. After the windows were removed, more lights were needed in the choir ceiling and artwork was hung where the windows were once located. In connection with the renovation, the many pillars holding up the 2nd floor seating gallery were clad with boards and painted.

== Media gallery ==
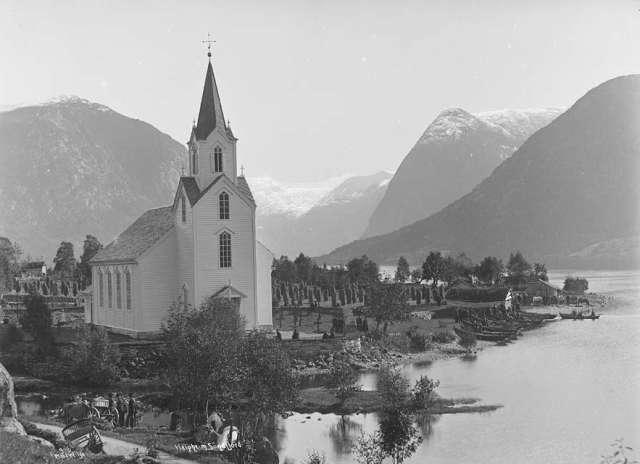
View of the church from the 1880s-1890s

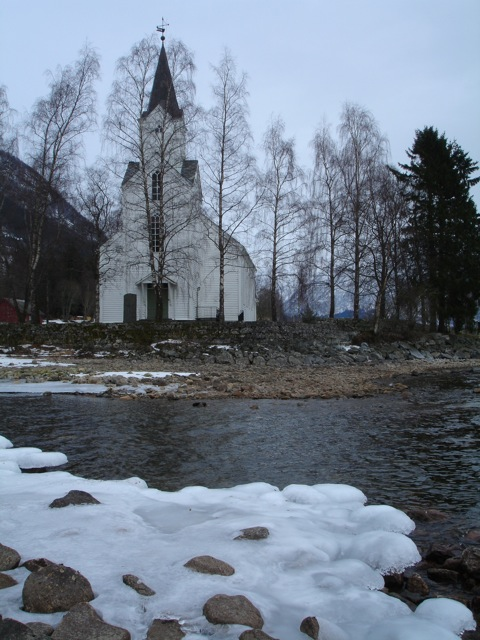
Front view

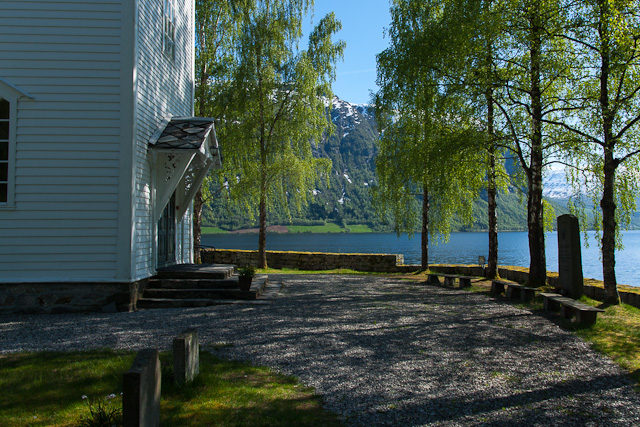
View of the main entrance with the lake in the background

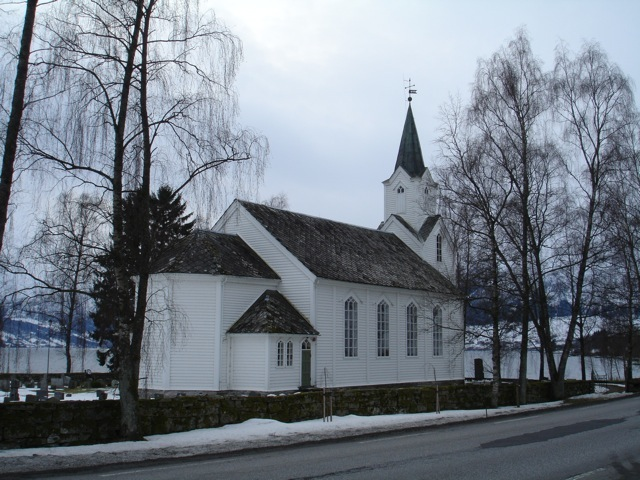
Side view of the church

== See also ==
- List of churches in Bjørgvin
