= Jølstravatnet =

Lake in Vestland, Norway

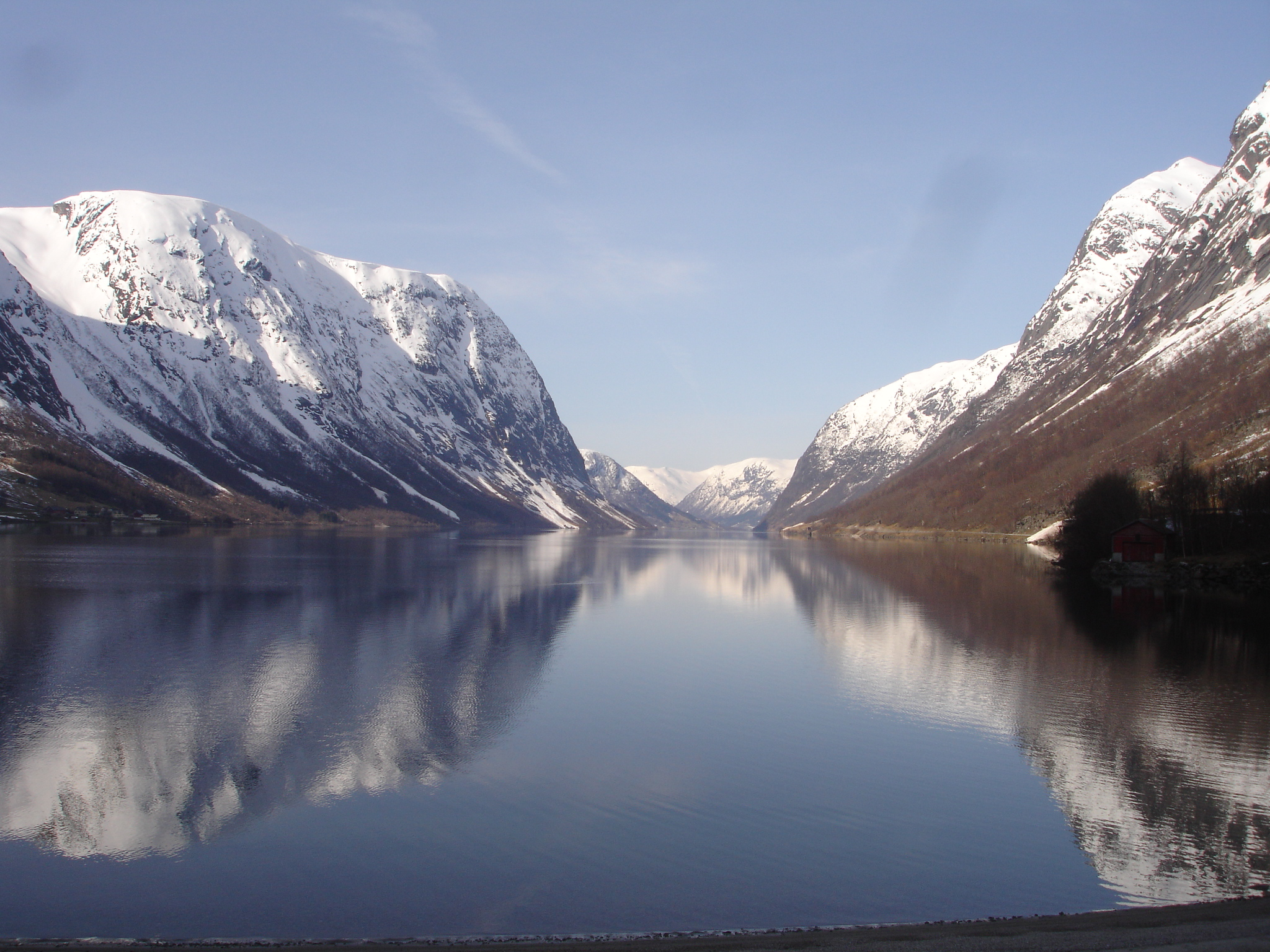
- Kjøsnesfjorden, the eastern part of lake Jølstravatnet
- Interactive map of the lake
- Location: Sunnfjord Municipality, Vestland
- Coordinates: 61.51186°N 6.27764°E
- Primary inflows: River from Jostedalsbreen and several small contributaries
- Primary outflows: Jølstra river
- Catchment area: 384.12 km^{2} (148.31 sq mi)
- Basin countries: Norway
- Max. length: 30 kilometres (19 mi)
- Max. width: 1.75 kilometres (1.09 mi)
- Surface area: 39.25 km^{2} (15.15 sq mi)
- Average depth: 89 m (292 ft)
- Max. depth: 233 m (764 ft)
- Water volume: 3.49 km^{3} (0.84 cu mi)
- Shore length^{1}: 68.5 kilometres (42.6 mi)
- Surface elevation: 207 metres (679 ft)
- References: NVE
- ^{1} Shore length is not a well-defined measure.

Jølstravatnet is a lake in Sunnfjord Municipality in Vestland county, Norway. The lake empties its water into the 20-kilometre (12 mi) long Jølstra river which then flows into the Førdefjorden. The impressive eastern arm of Jølstravatnet is called Kjøsnesfjorden, although it is not a true fjord that is part of the sea. The villages of Skei, Helgheim, Ålhus, and Vassenden are located on the shores of the lake.

The 39.25-square-kilometre (15.15 sq mi) lake is located at an elevation of 207 m (679 ft) above sea level, and the deepest point in the lake is 233 m (764 ft) below the water level. The lake is about 30 km (19 mi) long and about 1 to 1.5 kilometres (0.62 to 0.93 mi) wide. Jølstravatn is a very good fishing lake.

The European route E39 highway runs along the entire northern shore of the lake. The Norwegian National Road 5 runs along the eastern shore of the lake. The Norwegian County Road 451 runs along the entire southern shore of the lake. There is one bridge that crosses over the lake; on the eastern part of the lake. The bridge is part of County Road 451 and it crosses over the Kjøsnesfjorden arm from the village of Sandvika to Kjøsnes.

== Media gallery ==
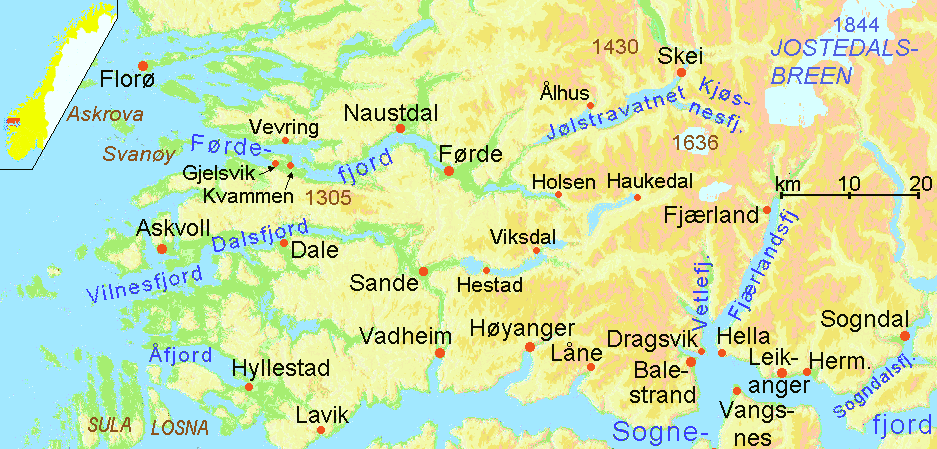
Location of Førdefjorden and Jølstravatnet

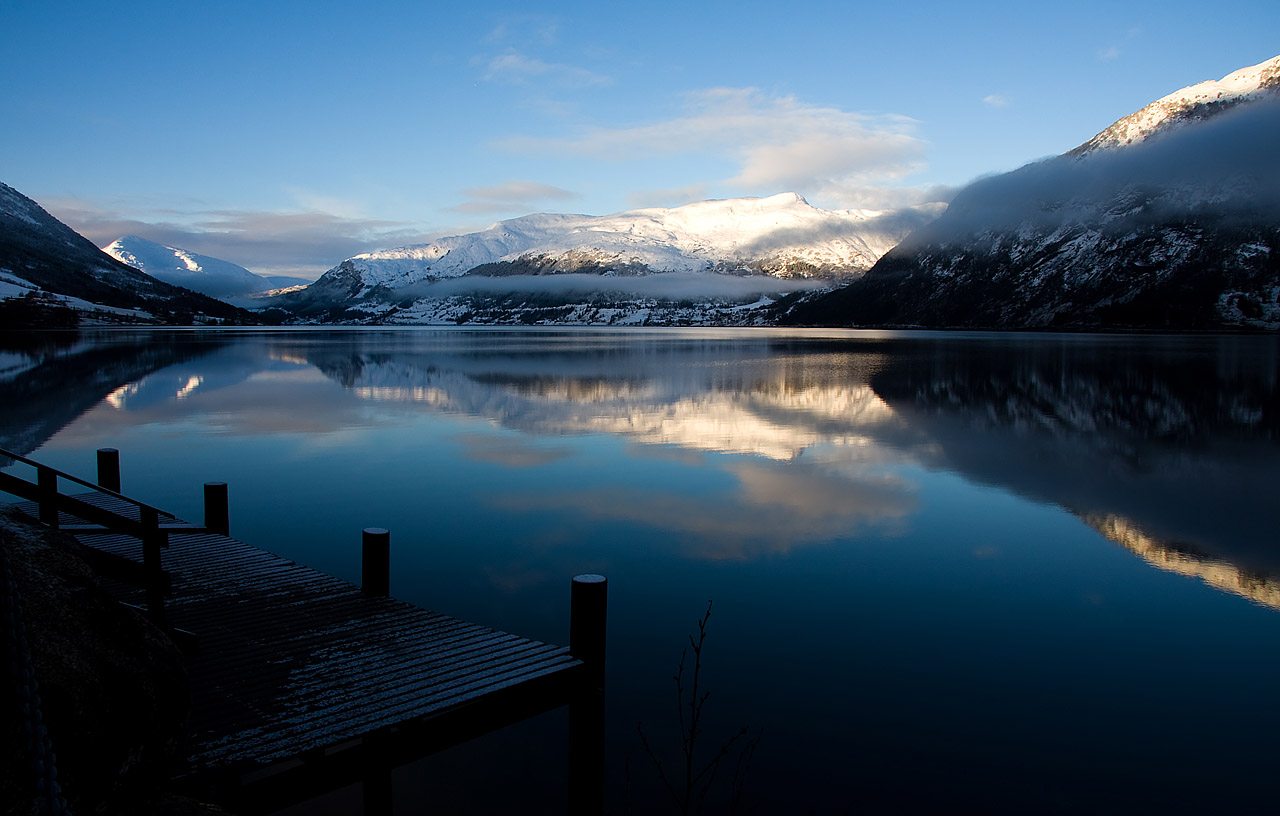
Jølstravatnet

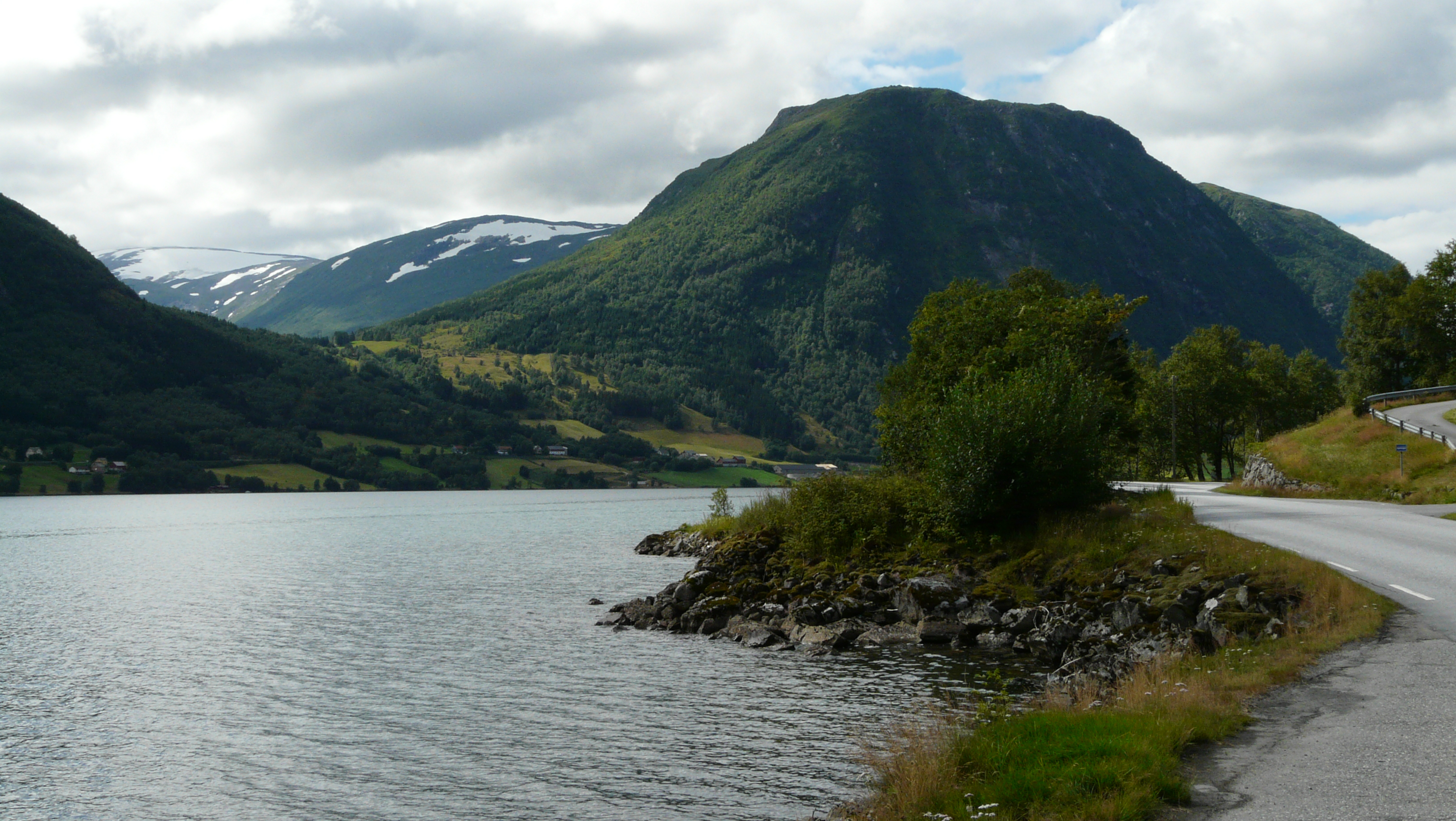
Looking west from the northern shore of the lake

== See also ==
- List of lakes in Norway
