= STOLports in Norway =

Norwegian network of airports with short runways

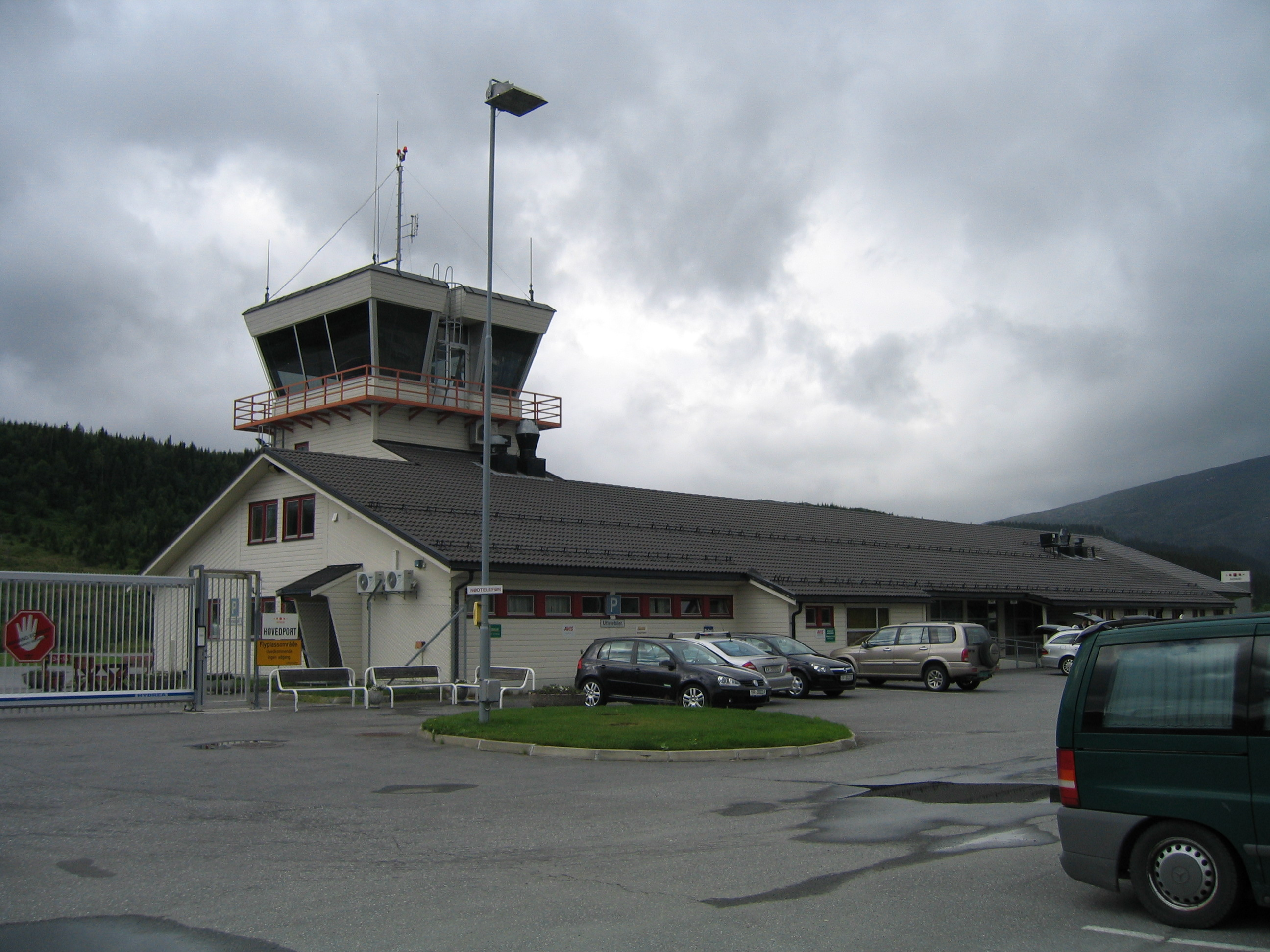
Mosjøen airport is part of the Norwegian kortbanenett.

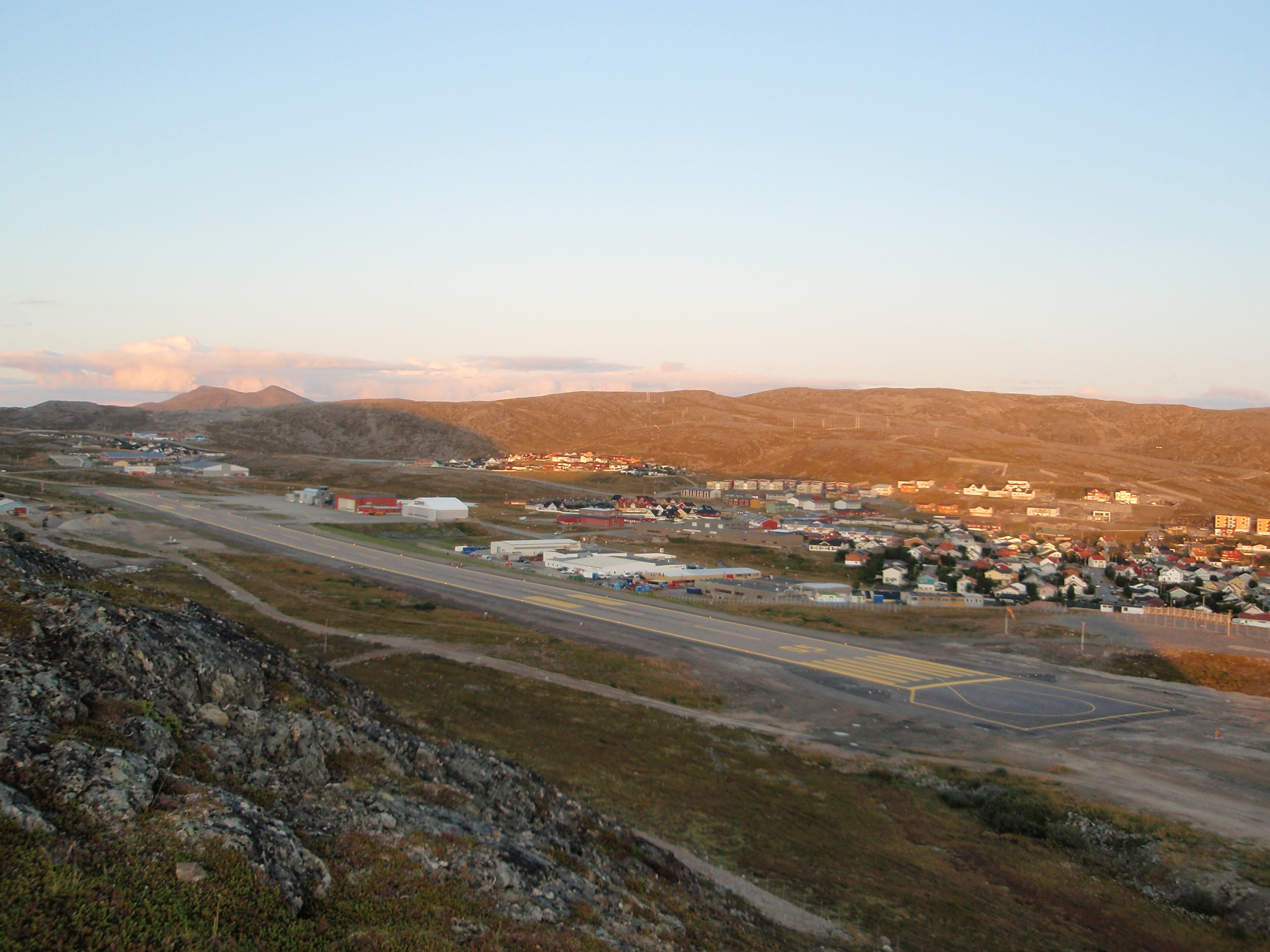
Hammerfest airport is part of the Norwegian kortbanenett.

The Norwegian STOLport network (Nynorsk: kortbanenettet i Noreg or Bokmål: kortbanenettet i Norge) is a network of STOLports, meaning that they are airports with short runways. The standard length of these runways is 800 metres (2,600 ft), compared to around 2,500 metres (8,200 ft) for a normal airport with 6-seat wide jetliners. In addition to shorter length, these airports are also narrower, with a standard width of 30 metres (98 ft) compared to that of 60 metres (200 ft), respectively. They can only be used with small propeller aircraft. As of 2020, 26 of these airports are in use and 4 have been closed.

The Norwegian STOLport network is a result of political decisions in the 1960s and start of the 1970s. The goal was to meet the requirement for better infrastructure out in the countryside, where there was a great desire for the establishment of airports. The network was officially opened 30 June 1968 by minister of transport Håkon Kyllingmark together with mayors, county governors and representatives of the airlines. Together they flew the route Trondheim–Namsos–Brønnøysund–Sandnessjøen–Mo i Rana–Bodø, with ribbon-cutting opening ceremonies at each stop. Most of the airports were subsequently built in the period 1968–1975.

== Background ==
The ministry of transport with Håkon Kyllingmark from the Conservative Party was a promoter for the work of developing new airports, especially in the northernmost counties of Norway. By the start of the 1970s, oil revenues had not yet taken hold in the Norwegian economy, so it was important to keep costs down. The result of this work was a standard for short airports, where the runway, approach equipment, terminal buildings, et cetera, was standardized and simple.

In Sweden, a network of regional 1,500-metre (4,900 ft) long runways was built during the same time.

== Remote control towers ==
On 20 October 2020, Avinor opened a remote control tower situated in Bodø as a cost effective solution intended for STOLports in Norway with little traffic. The remote tower technology is planned to be rolled out to a total of 15 airports in Norway by the end of 2022.

== Airplanes ==
The largest airplanes utilizing the Norwegian STOLport network today are Bombardier DHC-8 Dash-8 and ATR 42. During the first years, airlines such as Widerøe mostly used the DHC-6 Twin Otter with 13 seats.

== Future ==
Avinor, the Norwegian airport authority worries about the future availability of aircraft for 800 m (2,600 ft) runway, in future when older aircraft currently used retires. Currently, DHC-8-100 aircraft, manufactured in the early 1990s, are used. Avinor has found that after 2010, no new aircraft can be bought which has more than 20 seats and is able to use such short runways. For this reason there are plans to extend runways to 1,199 m (3,934 ft) or in some cases to build new airports, and to close some combined with road improvements. To extend them to above 1,200 m (3,900 ft) requires wider runway and greater space between the runway and buildings. This means a much higher cost, probably totally new runway, or new airport buildings. The least used will not be extended, but will have to be flown with very small aircraft. In 2022 ATR proposed a modification of its 48-seat ATR 42 which would be able to use 800 meter runways, but has since ceased development of the type, leaving Avinor without any realistic aircraft replacement. In the national plan for transportation 2022–2033 is however only Mo i Rana selected for a major project, a new airport.

== List of current STOLports in Norway ==
The following is a list of the 26 STOLports in Norway which are currently in use per 2020:

Airport	County	Runway length (m)
Berlevåg Airport	Finnmark	889
Brønnøysund Airport, Brønnøy	Nordland	1 199
Båtsfjord Airport	Finnmark	1 000
Florø Airport	Vestland	1 300
Førde Airport, Bringeland	Vestland	1 019
Hammerfest Airport	Finnmark	866
Hasvik Airport	Finnmark	909
Honningsvåg Airport, Valan	Finnmark	840
Leknes Airport	Nordland	1071
Mehamn Airport	Finnmark	800
Mo i Rana Airport, Røssvoll	Nordland	799
Mosjøen Airport, Kjærstad	Nordland	869
Namsos Airport, Høknesøra	Trøndelag	800
Rørvik Airport, Ryum	Trøndelag	830
Røst Airport	Nordland	799
Sandane Airport, Anda	Vestland	970
Sandnessjøen Airport, Stokka	Nordland	1 199
Sogndal Airport, Haukåsen	Vestland	1 110
Stokmarknes Airport, Skagen	Nordland	889
Stord Airport, Sørstokken	Vestland	1 460
Svolvær Airport, Helle	Nordland	876
Sørkjosen Airport	Troms	859
Vadsø Airport	Finnmark	870
Vardø Airport, Svartnes	Finnmark	1 085
Ørsta–Volda Airport, Hovden	Møre og Romsdal	1 070

Sources for runway length can be found in the respective articles.

== Closed STOLports in Norway ==
The following four STOLports have been closed:

- Førde airport, Øyrane (closed 1986) – replaced by a new STOLport
- Værøy airport (closed 1990) – replaced by a new heliport
- Båtsfjord Airport, Båtsfjorddalen, (closed 1999) – replaced by a new STOLport
- Narvik airport, Framnes (closed 2017) – road shortcut built to a larger airport
