= Gjoa (disambiguation) =

Gjoa may refer to:

- Gjøa (sailing sloop), a Norwegian sailing ship launched in 1872, the first ship to transit the Northwest Passage
  - Gjøa expedition, the first transit of the Northwest Passage in 1903–1906, under the command of Roald Amundsen, aboard the ship Gjøa
- SS Gjøa (1906), a Norwegian cargo steamship
- Gjøa oilfield, an oilfield in the Norwegian sector of the North Sea, Atlantic Ocean.
- Gjöa Rupes (Gjoa Ridge) on Mercury
- Gjöa Bay, another name for Gjøahavn (Gjøa Harbour), see Gjoa Haven
- SK Gjøa (Gjoa Sports Club), a Norwegian sports club in Oslo with a soccer team and ice hockey team

== See also ==
- Gjoa Haven (disambiguation)
