= ENSG =

ENSG is an acronym which may pertain to :

- École nationale des sciences géographiques, an engineering school in France.
- the ICAO code of Sogndal Airport, Haukåsen in Norway.
- the former Electricity Networks Strategy Group from 2003 to 2008.
