= Airlift (company) =

Norwegian helicopter operator

- Founded: 1986
- Operating bases: Førde Airport, Bringeland
- Fleet size: 16
- Parent company: Noordzee Helikopters Vlaanderen
- Headquarters: Sunnfjord Municipality, Norway
- Website: airlift.no

Airlift AS is a helicopter operator based at Førde Airport, Bringeland in Sunnfjord Municipality in Vestland county, Norway. The company operates a combined sixteen Eurocopter AS350 Écureuil and Eurocopter AS332 Super Puma. In addition to Bringeland, the company has bases at Kinsarvik, Stranda, Ljosland, and Hønefoss Airport, Eggemoen. Airlift is owned by Noordzee Helikopters Vlaanderen and has about seventy employees.

== History ==
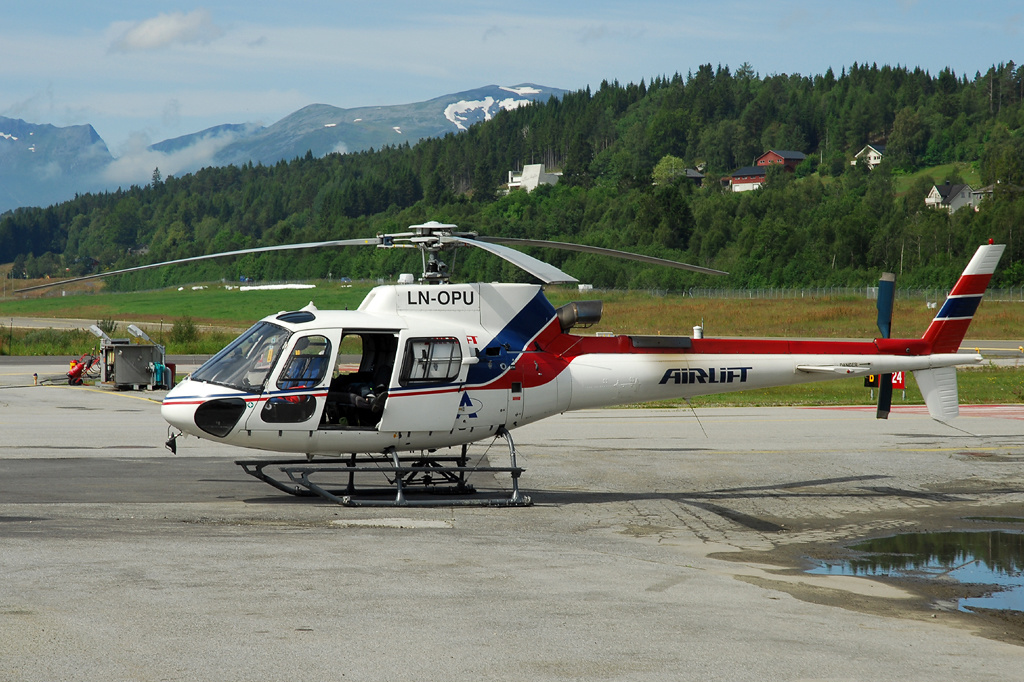
Airlift Eurocopter AS350 at Ørsta–Volda Airport, Hovden

The company was incorporated in 1986 by Torbjørn Lie. It was originally based at Førde Airport, Øyrane in the town center. After it was closed, Airlift moved to Bringeland in 1988. It later won contracts to fly air ambulance services. In 1996 Airlift won a contract to fly services for the Governor of Svalbard, with a base at Svalbard Airport, Longyear. This contract was retained until 2014.

Airlift has had a fluctuating ownership situation. It bought the Swedish helicopter operators Helikopterservice in 2001 and Ostermann Helicopter the following year. At this point the group's size peaked at 26 aircraft. Ostermann was sold in 2005. Meanwhile, Helicopter Transportation Group secured control full ownership of Airlift in 2002. However, they sold sixty percent to BlueWay Offshore, controlled by the Reitan Group, in 2006. Airlift then bought forty percent of Stryn-based Helikopter Utleie in 2007. Airlift is the only company which is contracted by the government for search and rescue operations.
