= Førde Airport =

Airport in Bringelandsåsen, Norway

Førde Airport Førde lufthamn

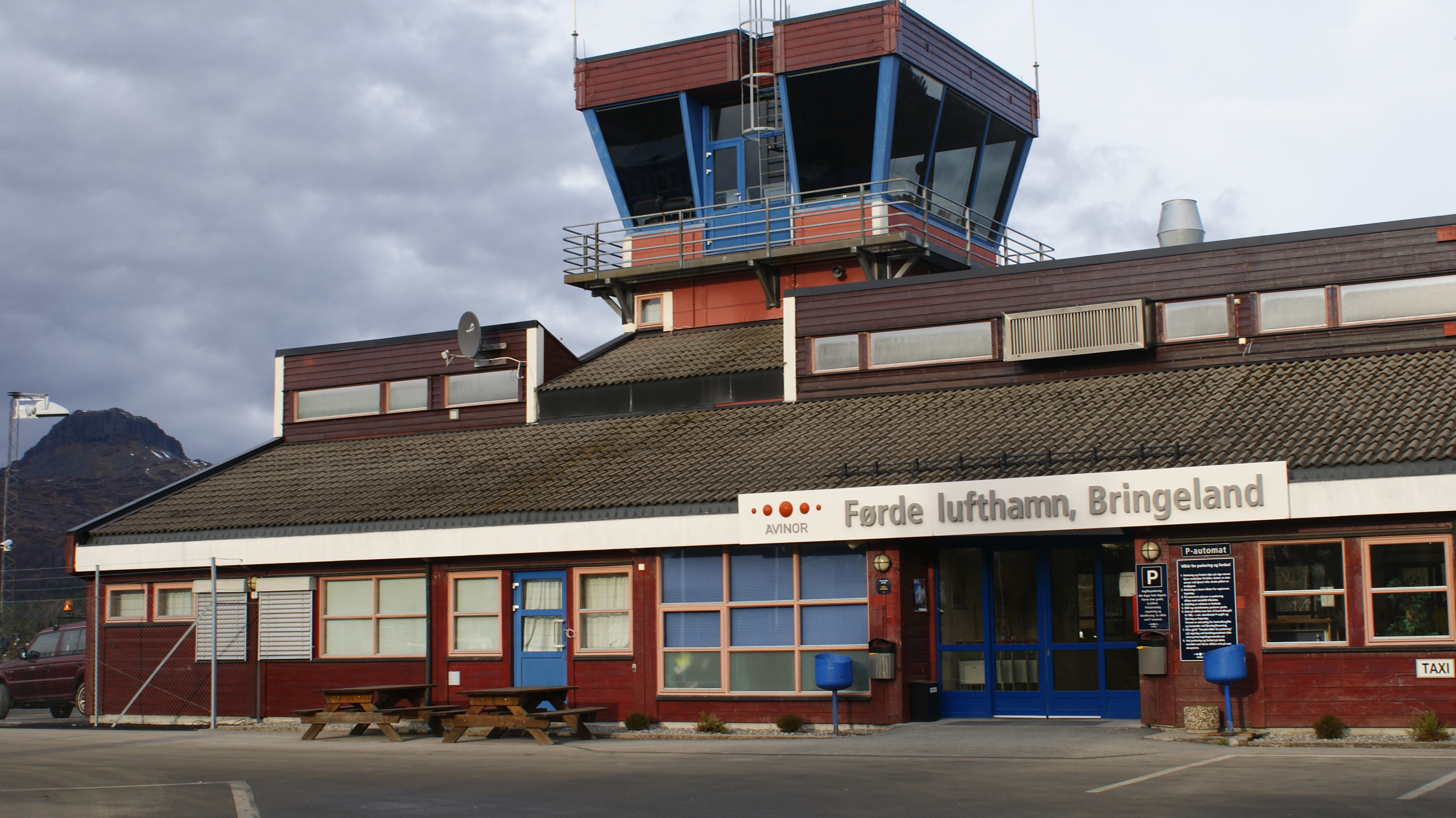
- IATA: FDE; ICAO: ENBL

Summary
- Airport type: Public
- Owner/Operator: Avinor
- Serves: Førde, Norway
- Location: Bringelandsåsen, Sunnfjord Municipality, Vestland
- Elevation AMSL: 319 m / 1,045 ft
- Coordinates: 61°23′28″N 005°45′25″E
- Website: avinor.no

Map
- Location within Norway

Runways
Direction	Length		Surface
Direction	m	ft	Surface
07/25	1,019	3,638	Asphalt

Statistics (2014)
- Passengers: 82,356
- Aircraft movements: 8,109
- Cargo (tonnes): 3

Førde Airport (Nynorsk: Førde lufthamn; IATA: FDE, ICAO: ENBL) is a regional airport located at Bringelandsåsen in Sunnfjord Municipality, about 16 kilometers (10 mi) south of the town of Førde in Vestland county, Norway. Owned and operated by the state-owned Avinor, the airport has a single 1,019-meter (3,343 ft) runway numbered 07–25. It is served by Widerøe, which operates De Havilland Canada Dash 8 aircraft to Oslo.

Starting in 1970, the town of Førde was served by Førde Airport, Øyrane, located in an industrial site in town and with poor operational conditions. Bringeland was opened in 1986 and the old airport was closed. Bringeland originally consisted of a 859-meter (2,818 ft) runway, but that was lengthened in 2010. Since 1988, the helicopter operator Airlift has also been based at the airport. The airport was originally owned by the municipality, but nationalized in 1996. Bringeland served 82,356 passengers in 2011.

== History ==
=== Øyrane ===
The first plans for an airport serving the Sunnfjord region was in the town of Florø; construction started in 1956, but was halted. A government commission recommended in 1964 that a primary airport be built in Florø serve the entire county. These plans were changed in 1965, following Håkon Kyllingmark being appointed Ministry of Transport. He instead insisted on a network of STOL (Short Takeoff and Landing) airports for smaller communities. Førde Airport, Øyrane, was built with such specifications, but Øyrane was an industrial area outside the town center. From 1971 it became part of the regional aviation network in Western Norway.

From before the airport was built it was evident that the Øyrane location was not well suited, and planning of an alternative location began in 1968. The main concern was that the airport lacked an instrument landing system and could thus only be used during daylight hours. The first alternative location proposal was for Langelandsåsen, but the site was discarded by the Civil Aviation Administration (CAA) because of poor weather conditions. Later proposals were Espelandsmyrene and then Alværa on the Sognefjord. By 1972, the CAA had concluded that there probably was not a suitable location for an airport near Førde and recommended that the town instead by served by Florø Airport, located 70 kilometers (43 mi) away.

=== Construction and operational history ===
Bringelandsåsen was proposed by the CAA in 1974. Plans were developed and in 1983 the Ministry of Transport and Communications recommended that Øyrane be closed and replaced with an all-new STOL (Short Takeoff and Landing) airport at Bringeland. Construction started in 1985 and the new airport opened on 31 August 1986, taking over all scheduled traffic from Øyrane.

Widerøe started scheduled services to Oslo and Bergen, originally using de Havilland Canada DHC-6 Twin Otter and the larger de Havilland Canada Dash 7 STOL aircraft, of which the latter was used for the service to Oslo. The STOL De Havilland Canada Dash 8 aircraft was phased in from 1993.

The helicopter-based carrier Airlift was established in 1986 and was based at Øyrane until 1988, when it also moved to Bringeland.

The airport was originally owned as an inter-municipal enterprise by Gaular and Førde. Operating deficits were covered through various subsidies from the state, often with unclear responsibilities and little financial risk for the owners. Most regional airports, including Førde, were nationalized in 1996 and transferred to the CAA, later renamed Avinor. Widerøe lost the public service obligation contract to fly to Florø Airport in 2000, and therefore moved its technical base for Western Norway to Førde, which included a new hangar.

Førde Airport had a café until 2006 and originally 859 meters (2,818 ft) runway. In 2009 and 2010, it was expanded with another 160 meters (520 ft) to the west. SCAT-I was installed in 2011. The following year, Widerøe regained the Florø contract, and moved its technical base back there.

== Facilities ==
Førde Airport, Bringeland is owned and operated by the state-owned Avinor. The airport has a 1,019-by-30-meter (3,343 by 98 ft) asphalt runway, aligned 07–25. Instrument flight rules are only allowed for aircraft equipped with SCAT-I. The terminal has a small conference center, and the airport is a seventeen-minute drive from Førde. Firda Billag operates an airport coach to Førda, which takes twenty minutes. Paid parking, taxis and car rental is available at the airport. Airlift has its own hangar, helipad and administration buildings.

== Airlines and destinations ==
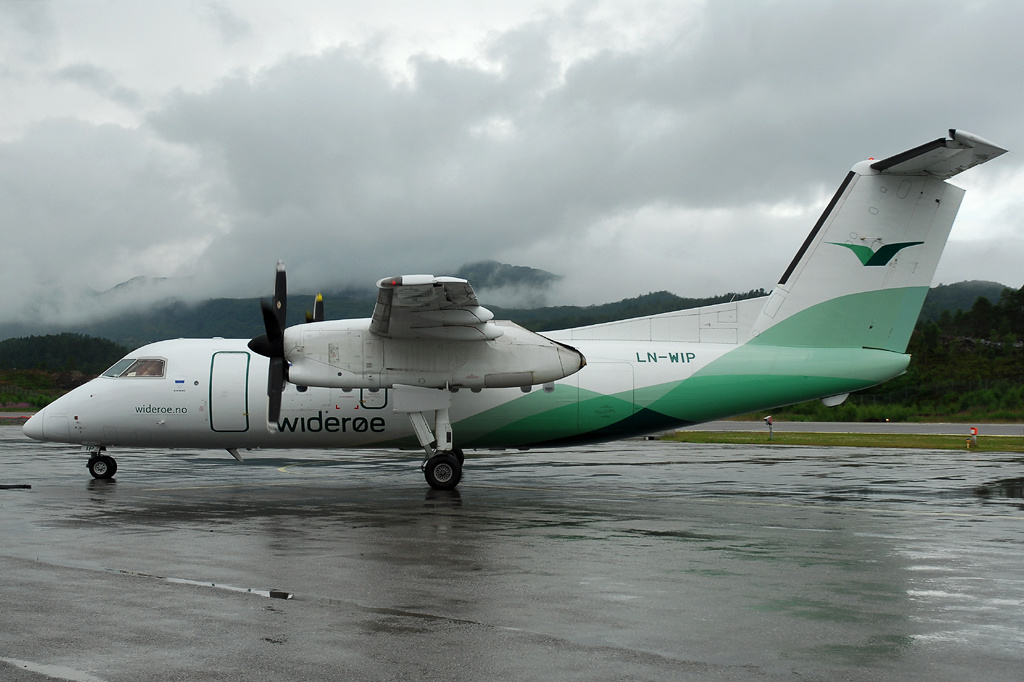
de Havilland Canada Dash 8-100 of Widerøe at Bringeland

Widerøe operates all scheduled services out of Førde, connecting it to Oslo Airport, Gardermoen. The flights are operated with Dash 8-100 aircraft and are subsidized as part of a public service obligation contract with the Ministry of Transport and Communications. Førde Airport is the local airport for ten municipalities in the Western Norway districts of Sunnfjord and Outer Sogn. The airport had 82,356 passengers, 8,109 aircraft movements and 3 tonnes of cargo in 2014. Less than a fifth of the patronage travels to Bergen, and Førde even experiences some leakage by people driving to Bergen Airport directly.

The helicopter operator Airlift is based at Bringeland; it is the largest employer in Gaular, with 150 employees in 2002. The company flies air ambulance and various charter services. Also at the airport is an aviation club, Fjordane Flyklubb.

Airlines	Destinations
Widerøe	Oslo

== Statistics ==
Annual passenger traffic
Year	Passengers	% Change
2025	82,922	▲9.8%
2024	75,524	▲10.1%
2023	68,618	▲7.2%
2022	64,026	▲59.7%
2021	40,095	▲17.7%
2020	34,078	▼ -59.1%
2019	83,306	▼ -2.1%
2018	85,083	▼ -0.5%
2017	85,479	▲2.1%
2016	83,752	▲1.0%
2015	82,909	

== Future ==
Avinor has started a process to look at the airport structure in Sogn og Fjordane. Early plans have looked at closing down Førde Airport, and possibly also Sandane Airport, Anda, while expanding the runway at Florø Airport to 2,000 meters (6,600 ft). This would allow for jetliners to operate from Florø to Oslo with significantly lower ticket prices [not likely with less than 80-120'000 citizens within 50–80 km radius] and remove the need for subsidies. Previously, the Ministry of Transport and Communications has proposed closing Sandane Airport and splitting the traffic between Førde and Ørsta–Volda Airport, Hovden. The road distance from Sandane to Bringeland is 97 kilometers (60 mi), from Sandane to Florø Airport 93 km (58 mi) and from Førde to Florø Airport 58 km (36 mi).

== Bibliography ==
- Bråthen, Svein (2012). Mulige endringer i lufthavnstrukturen – Samfunnsøkonomi og ruteopplegg (PDF) (in Norwegian). Møreforskning. ISBN 978-82-7830-165-4. Archived from the original (PDF) on 24 April 2012.
