= Gjoa Haven (disambiguation) =

Gjoa Haven ("Joe-Haven") may refer to:

- Gjoa Haven, King William Island, Kitikmeot Region, Nunavut, Canada; an Inuit hamlet above the Arctic Circle, the only settlement on King William Island
- Gjoa Haven Airport (IATA airport code: YHK; ICAO airport code: CYHK), an airport on King William Island located near the hamlet
- North Warning System#Gjoa Haven (Gjoa Haven SRR Site, CAM-CB), a NORAD air defence station short-range radar site, located near the hamlet
- Gjoa Haven CBIA-AM 640, a radio station located in the hamlet, rebroadcaster of Rankin Inlet FM 105.1 CBQR-FM
- Gjoa Haven (electoral district), a territorial riding containing the hamlet
- Utkuhiksalik or Gjoa Haven dialect, a sub-dialect of the Natsilingmiutut dialect of Inuvialuktun

== See also ==
- Gjoa (disambiguation)
