= BlueWay Offshore =

Norwegian helicopter airline, 2009–2014

IATA	ICAO	Call sign
—	BWN	BLUE HELI
- Founded: 2009
- Ceased operations: 2014
- Hubs: Stavanger Airport, Sola

BlueWay Offshore Norge AS was an offshore helicopter airline based at Stavanger Airport, Sola in Sola Municipality, Norway. Established in 2009, it remained until 2014 when the group was sold to Noordzee Helikopters Vlaanderen.

== History ==
The BlueWay Group had its basis in an ownership constellation for Airlift, a land-based helicopter operator. BlueWay was created when the Reiten Group bought part sixty percent of the stake in Airlift, with Helicopter Transport Group selling down from one hundred to forty percent.

BlueWay Offshore was incorporated in 2009. Within two years it had reached a revenue of 59 million kr. Its first major contract came in 2012, when it signed with Royall Dutch Shell for transport to the fields Draugen and Ormen Lange. The latter required the company to establish a base at Kristiansund Airport, Kvernberget. The same year it signed another agreement with Shell, this time in the Danish sector, with services commencing on 1 July 2014.

BlueWay was taken over by Noordzee Helikopters Vlaanderen in 2014.
