= Sandane Airport =

Sandane Airport Sandane lufthavn

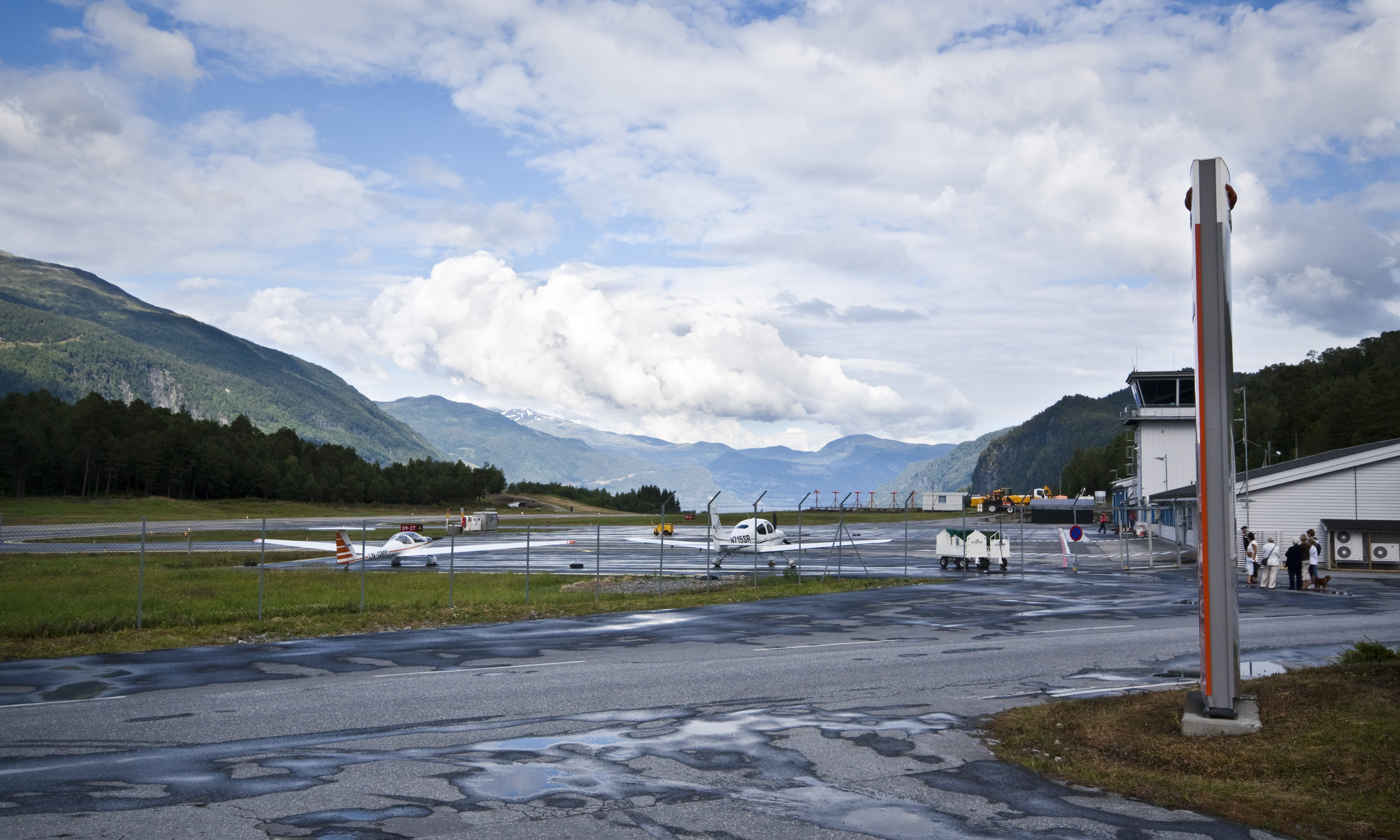
- IATA: SDN; ICAO: ENSD

Summary
- Airport type: Public
- Operator: Avinor
- Serves: Sandane and Nordfjordeid, Norway
- Location: Anda, Gloppen, Norway
- Elevation AMSL: 196 ft / 60 m
- Coordinates: 61°49′48″N 006°06′21″E
- Website: avinor.no

Map
- Location in Norway SDN (Norway)

Runways
Direction	Length		Surface
Direction	m	ft	Surface
08/26	970	3,182	Asphalt

Statistics (2014)
- Passengers: 37,272
- Aircraft movements: 2,997
- Cargo (tonnes): 1

Sandane Airport (Norwegian: Sandane lufthavn; IATA: SDN, ICAO: ENSD) is a regional airport serving the village of Sandane in Gloppen Municipality, Vestland county, Norway. It perpendicularly straddles the Anda peninsula between the Nordfjorden and Gloppefjorden. The airport has an asphalt runway measuring 970 by 30 meters (3,182 by 98 ft) and aligned 08/26. Services are provided by Widerøe on public service obligation with the Ministry of Transport and Communications. The airport is owned and operated by the state-owned Avinor and served 37,272 passengers in 2013.

The airport was opened on 1 July 1975 as the only public airport serving Nordfjord, four years after the other regional airports in Sogn og Fjordane county. Originally the airport was served with de Havilland Canada Twin Otters. The airport was plagued with severe turbulence and low regularity. A terminal expansion took place in 1987 and the runway was slightly expanded in 2010.

== History ==
The first four airports in Sogn og Fjordane county and southern Sunnmøre opened on 1 July 1971: Florø Airport: Førde Airport, Øyrane; Sogndal Airport, Haukåsen and Ørsta–Volda Airport, Hovden. This left the district of Nordfjord without an airport. Four locations were considered; in addition to Anda, these were Markane in Stryn Municipality, Bjørlomona in Eid and Mona in Sandane. Anda was ultimately selected. The airport opened on 1 July 1975. Services were part of the West Coast route operated by Widerøe with their 19-seat de Havilland Canada Twin Otters. Services were originally flown to Bergen Airport, Flesland; Ålesund Airport, Vigra and other regional airports on the coast.

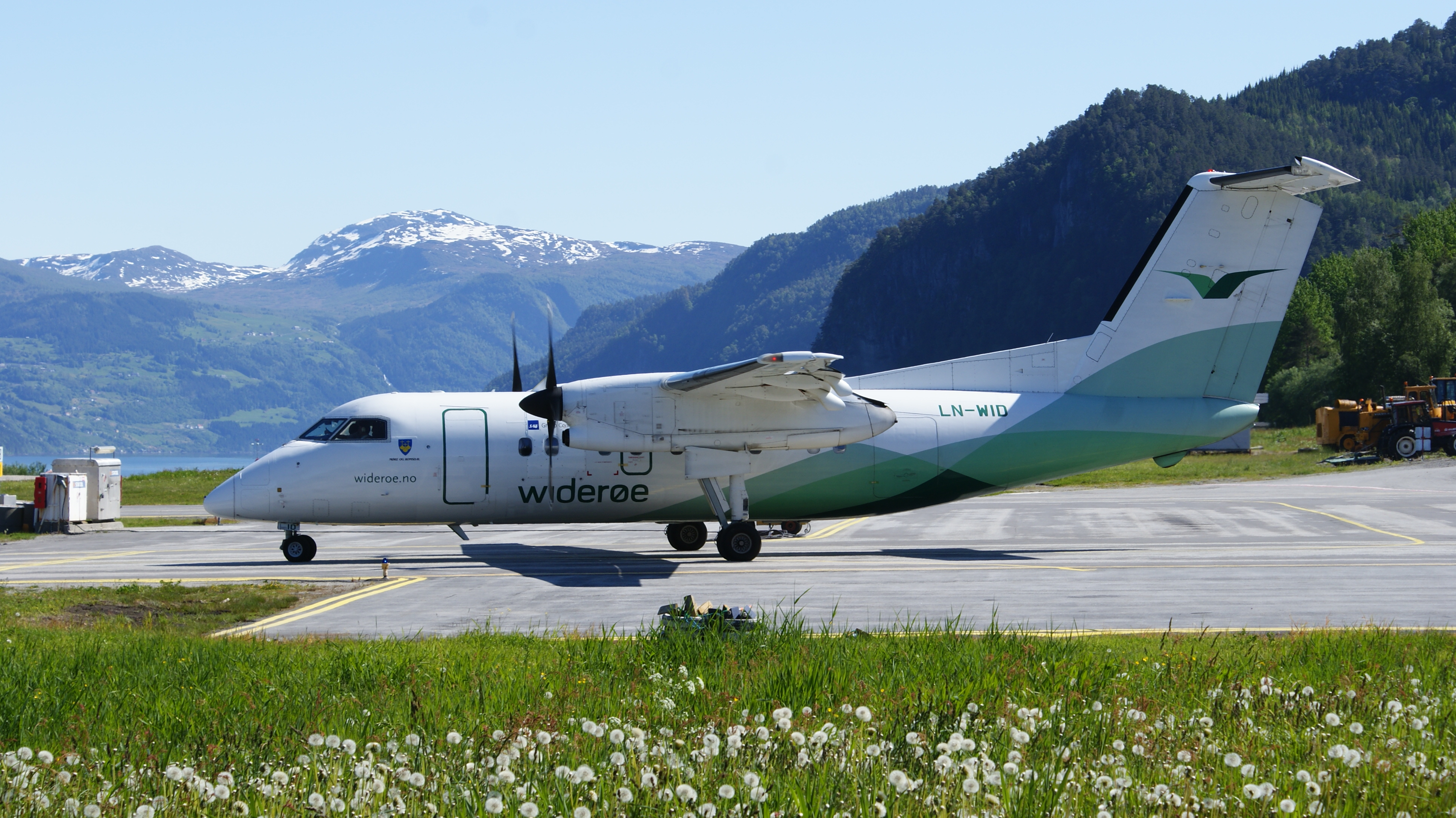
Widerøe de Havilland Canada Dash-8 103 at Sandane Airport

To a much greater degree than other regional airports in the area, Anda was subject to severe wind, frequently canceling flights. This was in part due to severe turbulence during the landing. Combined with poor navigation, this caused several near-accidents. This prompted additional navigational equipment to be installed. The airport has had much lower regularity than the other airports in the county. The regularity has been improved thanks to instrument landing systems to around 5 % cancelled flights in 2022.

The airport initially had two people in the tower and two and a half for other operations. The airport had two employees on duty at any time while open: one in the tower and one who managed operations and the fire and rescue service, as well as parts of the ground handling. The terminal building was minimal, built for the 20 seat Twin Otter, and check-in was handled by a travel agency in Sandane. This changed in 1987 when the terminal building was rebuilt and the check-in moved to the airport.

Widerøe replaced its Twin Otters with the de Havilland Canada Dash 8 in the early 1990s. Ownership of the airport passed from Gloppen Municipality to the Civil Aviation Administration (later renamed Avinor) on 1 January 1997. Airport security was introduced on 1 January 2005. The airport was closed between 1 March and 26 August 2010 for renovations costing NOK 150 million. The main work was lengthening the runway by 160 meters (520 ft). The European route E39 is built in a tunnel under the extended runway.

== Facilities ==
Sandane Airport is located at Anda in Gloppen, Norway. It is situated perpendicularly on a peninsula which cuts between the Nordfjorden and Gloppefjorden. Both ends of the runway are close to sleep hillsides which dive into the fjords. Four kilometres west of the runway, there is a 400 m high mountain ridge, which is too close for aircraft to pass, so they have to do a sharp turn close to the runway. Travel + Leisure included Sandane in its 2009 list of the world's seventeen scariest runways. The aerodrome has a reference elevation of 60 meters (196 ft).

The asphalt runway measures 970 by 30 meters (3,182 by 98 ft) and is aligned 08/26. It has a takeoff run available (TORA) of 820 meters (2,690 ft) and a landing distance available (LDA) of 760 meters (2,490 ft). The airport is equipped with category 4 fire and rescue service. The airport is situated 10 kilometers (6.2 mi) from Sandane. Paid parking, taxis and car rental are available at the airport.

== Airlines and destinations ==
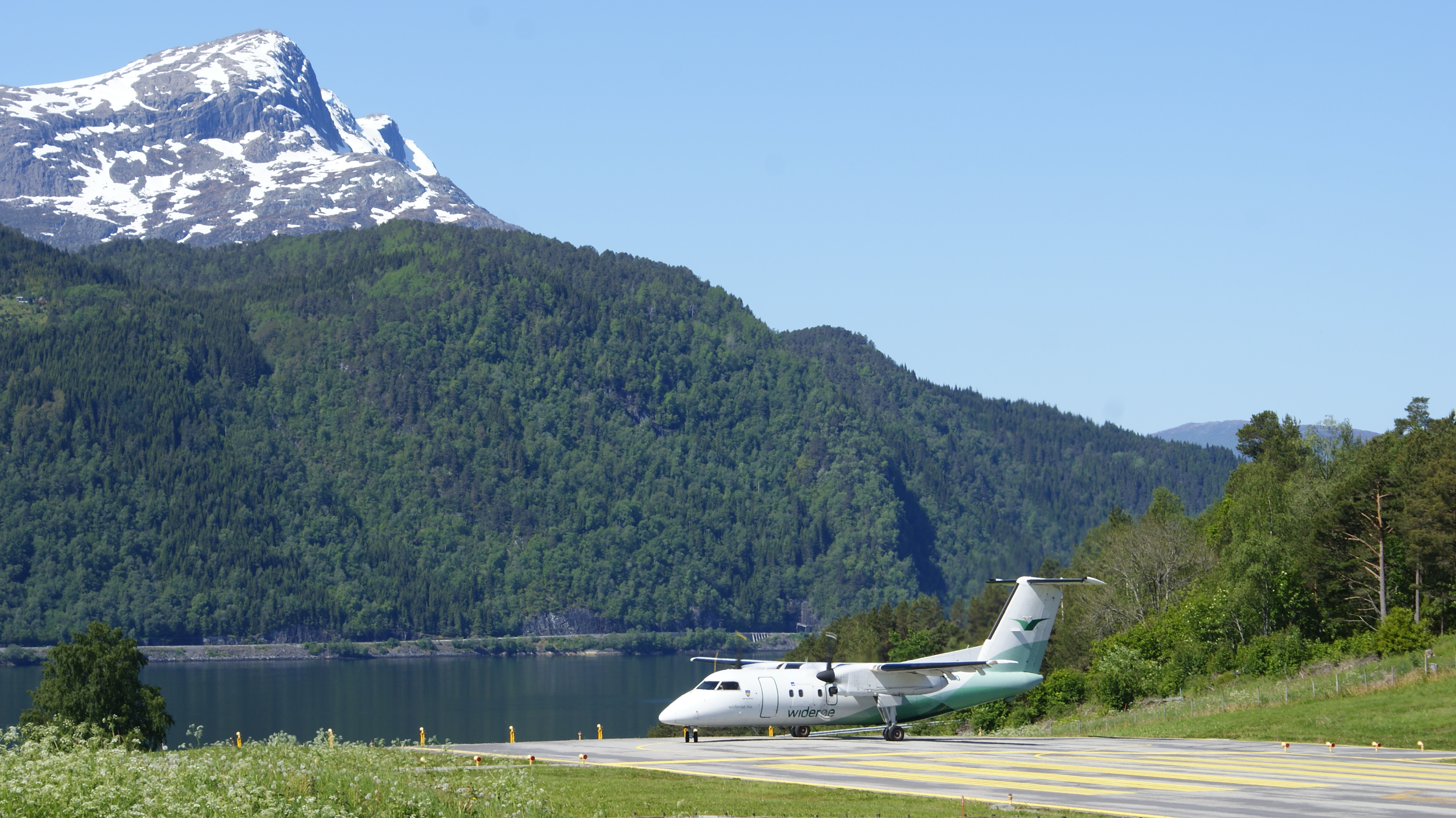
Widerøe de Havilland Canada Dash-8 103 positioning for takeoff at the far end of the runway near E39 route

Widerøe provides the only scheduled services at Sandane Airport. They are operated as public service obligation with the Ministry of Transport and Communications and are flown with Dash 8-100 aircraft. Services are provided to Oslo with intermediate stops in Sogndal. Operation of the airport runs at a deficit of NOK 20 million in 2012. In addition the routes are subsidies at a cost of NOK 1163 per passenger. Combined the air service received subsidies of NOK 1,476 per year.

Airlines	Destinations
Widerøe	Bergen, Oslo, Sogndal; Seasonal: Ørsta-Volda

== Statistics ==
In 2015, Sandane Airport served 37,272 passengers, 2,977 aircraft movements and 1.5 tonnes of cargo.

Annual passenger traffic
Year	Passengers	% Change
2025	49,922	▲5.4%
2024	47,352	▲4.4%
2023	45,362	▲12.7%
2022	40,240	▲51.1%
2021	26,638	▲25.6%
2020	21,206	▼ -48.7%
2019	41,353	▼ -2.1%
2018	42,251	▼ -5.9%
2017	44,900	▲3.5%
2016	43,398	▲4.9%
2015	41,368	

== Road connections ==
The airport is located at the road E39. Taxis and rental cars are available. Sandane is located 10 kilometres (6.2 mi) away. Nordfjordeid is located 12 kilometres (7.5 mi) from the airport, but that includes a ferry connection. People in Nordfjordeid can also drive to Ørsta–Volda Airport, Hovden which from 2012 can be driven without using a ferry, but that is 78 kilometres (48 mi) away.

== Future ==
Avinor is considering the regional airport structure in Southern Norway and has looked at the fate of Sandane airport. Of the five airports in the northwest, Sandane is by far the least used. Avinor has started a process to look at the airport structure in Sogn og Fjordane. After 2010, no new aircraft can be purchased except for small ones, which can use very short runways such as Sandane. Early plans have looked at closing down Førde Airport, Bringeland and Sandane Airport while expanding the runway at Florø to 2,000 meters (6,600 ft). This would allow for jetliners to operate from Florø to Oslo with significantly lower ticket prices and remove the need for subsidies.

Previously, the Ministry of Transport and Communications has proposed closing Sandane Airport and splitting the traffic between Førde and Ørsta–Volda Airport, Hovden. The road distance from Sandane to Førde-Bringeland is 97 kilometers (60 mi). People in Nordfjordeid and Stryn on the other side of Nordfjorden have been users of Sandane Airport. Road projects, such as the 2012 opening of the Kviv Tunnel has created one hour road distance without ferry for them to Hovden. Combined with the inability to extend the runway at Sandane further, this could cause the authorities to close down the airport.

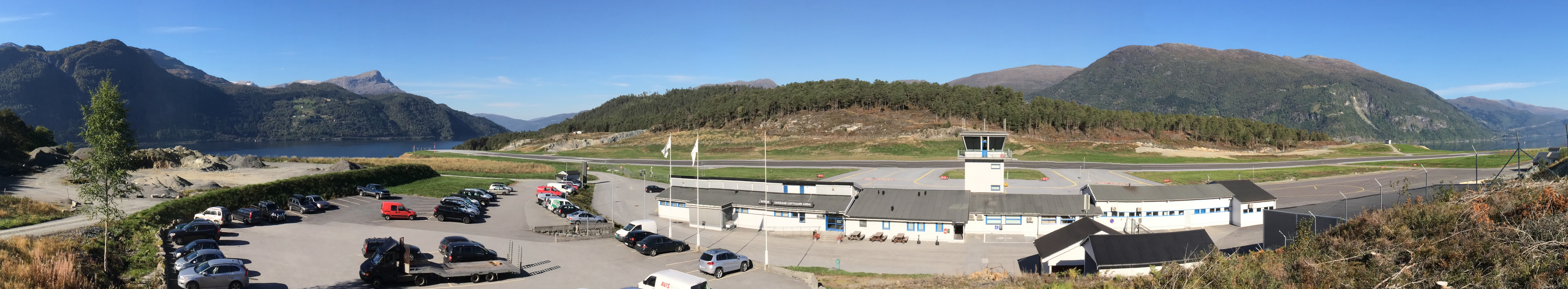
Panorama of the airport

== Bibliography ==
- Arnesen, Odd (1984). På grønne vinger over Norge (in Norwegian). Widerøe's Flyveselskap.
- Larsen, Harald Thune; Bråthen, Svein; Eriksen, Knut Sandberg. Forslag til anbudsopplegg for regionale flyruter i Sør-Norge (PDF) (in Norwegian). Institute of Transport Economics. ISBN 978-82-480-1538-3. ISSN 0808-1190.
