= Øyrane =

Village in Sunnfjord Municipality, Norway

- Village
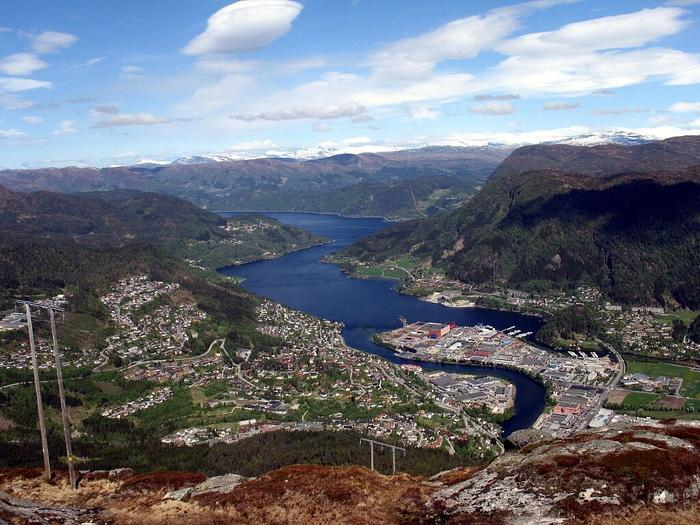
- Øyrane is the peninsula with the industrial complex between the river and the bay
- Interactive map of Øyrane
- Location within Vestland Location within Norway
- Coordinates: 61.45745°N 5.84802°E
- Country: Norway
- Region: Western Norway
- County: Vestland
- District: Sunnfjord
- Municipality: Sunnfjord Municipality
- Elevation: 2 m (6.6 ft)
- Time zone: UTC+01:00 (CET)
  - Summer (DST): UTC+02:00 (CEST)
- Post Code: 6800 Førde

Øyrane is a neighborhood in the town of Førde in Sunnfjord Municipality in Vestland county, Norway, just west of the town center. The river Jølstra empties into the Førdefjorden just west of Øyrane.

== History ==
The town of Førde was declared as a "center of growth" in 1965, which resulted in a series of public agencies and industrial enterprises being built in the town. The selection of Førde was tied to its central location within Sogn og Fjordane county. Immediately after the appointment, work began on establishing an industrial facility at Øyrane. The Industrial Development Corporation of Norway established an industrial park at Øyrane in 1968 and there was also a shipyard, Ankerløkken Verft. In 1970, Førde Airport, Øyrane opened at the site. The site was poorly suited for an airport, and in 1986, it was replaced by Førde Airport, Bringeland, a little further away from the town.
