= Florø Airport =

Florø Airport Florø lufthamn

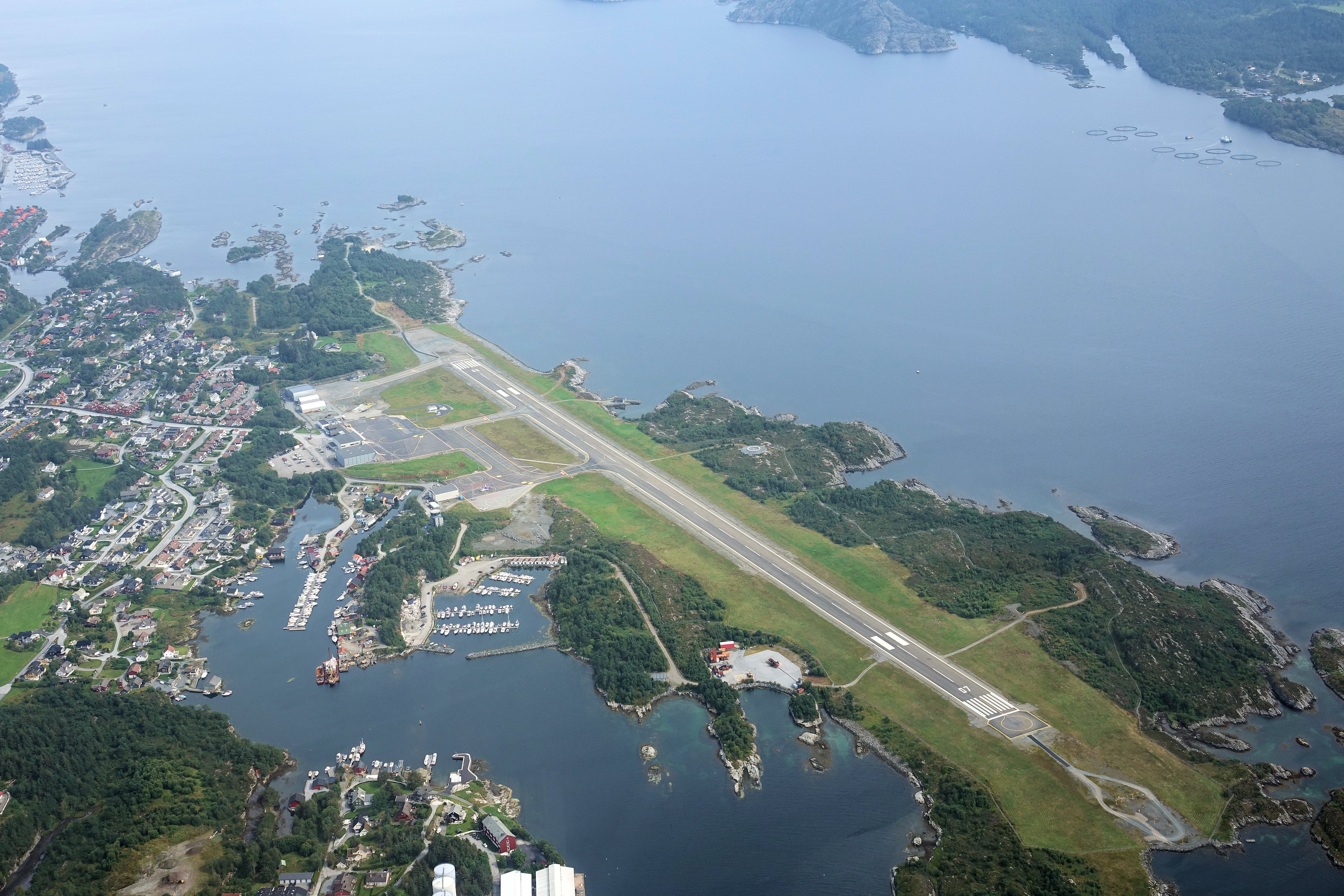
- IATA: FRO; ICAO: ENFL

Summary
- Airport type: Public
- Operator: Avinor
- Serves: Florø, Norway
- Location: Florelandet, Kinn Municipality
- Elevation AMSL: 11 m (36 ft)
- Coordinates: 61°35′01″N 005°01′29″E
- Website: avinor.no

Map
- Location in Norway

Runways
Direction	Length		Surface
Direction	m	ft	Surface
07/25	1,264	4,147	Asphalt

Statistics (2023)
- Passengers: 157,621
- Aircraft movements: 8,574
- Cargo (tonnes): 245

Florø Airport (Nynorsk: Florø lufthamn, IATA: FRO, ICAO: ENFL) is a regional airport serving the town of Florø in Kinn Municipality, in the west central part of Vestland county, Norway. It is situated on the southern shore of the island of Florelandet, adjacent to the town center. Owned and operated by the state-owned Avinor, it features a 1,264-meter (4,147 ft) runway aligned 07/25. The airport had 201,686 passengers in 2014, making it the busiest regional airport in the country.

The airport is served by Widerøe with flights to Bergen Airport and Danish Air Transport to Oslo Airport. Bristow Helicopters flies to the North Sea oil platforms at Snorre, Visund, Gjøa and Knarr. CHC Helikopter Service operates an AS332 Super Puma search and rescue helicopter out of Florø on behalf of The Royal Norwegian Air Force's 330 Squadron.

Construction of an airport first commenced in 1956, but was terminated. Florø Airport opened as part of a network of four regional airports on 1 July 1971. Widerøe served it with de Havilland Canada Twin Otters, later also de Havilland Canada Dash 7s. The heliport opened in 1994 and the runway was extended from the original 830 meters (2,720 ft) in 2000. That year Coast Air took over the routes from Widerøe. Danish Air Transport resumed them in 2003 until Widerøe again won back the operations in 2012. The search and rescue base opened in 2009. There are proposals to extend the runway further.

== History ==
Norwegian Air Lines commenced services along the West Coast of the Norway in 1935. These would call at Florø on demand, landing at the docks at Florevika. The seaplane routes required a boat to ferry out to the aircraft to embark and disembark passengers. From 1951 to 1959 Florø Radio operated an aeradio at Rognaldsvåg to assist air navigation along the coast.

Large-scale construction of airports in Norway started in the 1950s, largely funded by the North Atlantic Treaty Organization (NATO). Bergen Airport, Flesland opened in 1955, followed by Ålesund Airport, Vigra in 1958. The first plans for an airport in Sunnfjord were launched by Engineer Arne Bengtsen, who proposed building an airfield in Florø and having West Norway Airlines operate to it using the Scottish Aviation Twin Pioneer. This was backed by Kinn Municipality and Florø Municipality, who considered the possibilities of an 800-meter (2,600 ft) runway to be located at Havreneset. It would be designed as a combined land and water aerodrome, where seaplanes would feed to other locations in Sogn og Fjordane. These would land at Gunhildvågen. The proposal was approved by a government commission in 1956.

Construction of a 400-meter (1,300 ft) runway commenced in late 1956, with plans for later extension to 1,800 meters (5,900 ft). However, it soon became evident that the Twin Pioneer would not receive operating permit for winter operations. Construction of the airport was therefore scrapped. Part of the runway was used to build a street, Industrivegen.

A government commission, led by Erik Himle and later Preben Munthe, was appointed in 1962 to consider additional airports in Norway. The Sud Aviation Caravelle was about to be phased into use on the main domestic routes and the committee recommended in 1964 that nine new airports be built which could serve jetliners, including an airport in Florø. Widerøe launched an alternative proposal and suggested that a network of smaller airports be built instead, which could be served using short take-off and landing aircraft, which were being developed at the time. Smaller airports could be built and operated at lower cost than larger airports, but both airports and airlines would need subsidies to operate. Håkon Kyllingmark was appointed Minister of Transport and Communications in 1965 and was a proponent of the STOLport proposal. The political rationale was that, despite that the total operating costs would rise, it would provide better services to rural areas and thus keep up their population.

The regional airports only received a simple terminal and an 800-meter (2,600 ft) runway. The first such airports were opened in Helgeland in 1968. This was deeded sufficiently successful that Parliament approved the second stage in 1969, consisting of four airports in Northwestern Norway. In addition to Florø, these consisted of Førde Airport, Øyrane; Sogndal Airport, Haukåsen; and Ørsta–Volda Airport, Hovden. Florø Airport received a runway measuring 820 by 30 meters (2,690 by 98 ft) and an apron measuring 100 by 60 meters (330 by 200 ft). All four airports opened on 1 July 1971.

The government issued the task of operating the routes to Widerøe, who initially served it with its 19-seat de Havilland Canada DHC-6 Twin Otters. Services commenced to Bergen Airport, Flesland and Ålesund Airport, Vigra, as well as between the STOLports. Widerøe built its main base for Southern Norway at Florø Airport, consisting of a 900-square-meter (9,700 sq ft) hangar and staffed with six mechanics. Widerøe introduced the de Havilland Canada Dash 7 on the route from Florø and Sogndal to Oslo Airport, Fornebu in September 1983. Widerøe replaced its Twin Otters and Dash 7s with the de Havilland Canada Dash 8 in the early 1990s.

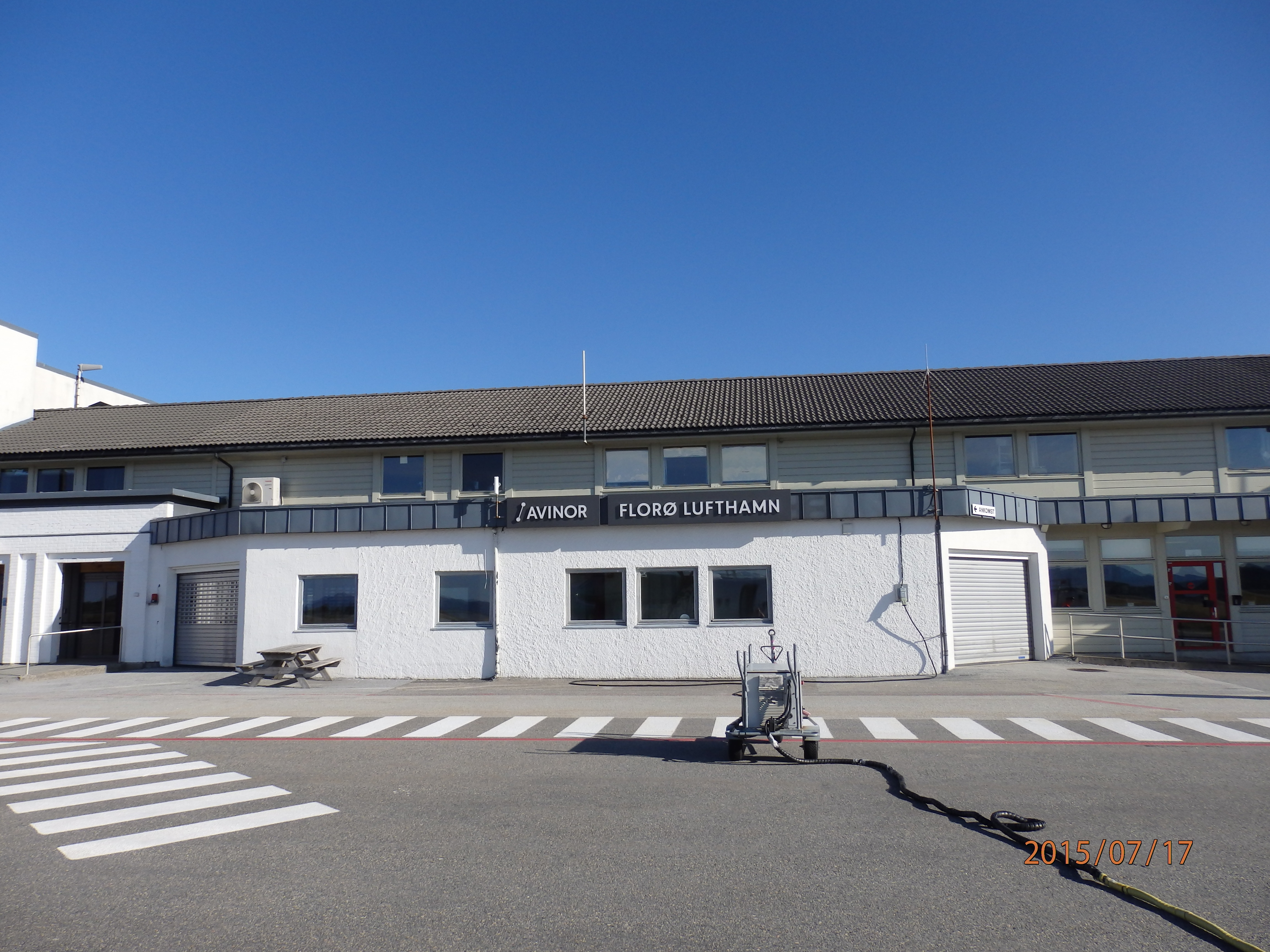
The terminal building

With the opening of the Snorre Oil Field in the North Sea, Florø Airport was selected as the heliport to fly out to the platforms. Saga Petroleum selected Helikopter Service as their operator, with the helibase opening in 1994. The increased traffic led to the extension of the runway to 1,199 meters (3,934 ft) in 2000.

From 1997 the flights were made subject to public service obligations. Widerøe won the first three-year contract. In the second contest in September 1999, Coast Air won the Florø contract. It introduced their two 46-seat ATR 42–300 aircraft. This caused Widerøe to have to move their base from Florø to Oslo Airport, Gardermoen. The company received NOK 51 million annually, from 1 April 2000 to 31 March 2003. The bid was about NOK 100 million lower than from Widerøe. All stopovers were thereby dropped. Coast Air flew four or five daily trips to both Bergen and Oslo. The demand for air travel dropped in 2001, and only 85,000 passengers flew with Coast Air to Florø, instead of the estimated 100,000, making the entire operation a loss for the company.

With the next round of PSO contracts, valid from 1 April 2003 through 31 March 2006, Coast Air lost the Florø contract to Danish Air Transport. The airline kept the contract for nine years. Airport security was introduced on 1 January 2005. Following a competition with Ålesund to receive a new search and rescue base, the government selected Florø as the sixth detachment of the Royal Norwegian Air Force's 330 Squadron. The base became operational in September 2009 after investments of 70 million Norwegian krone. The following year GDF Suez started operations on its Gjøa Oil Field and CHC Helikopter Service expanded its base.

Widerøe was able to reclaim the Florø contract in the 2012 tender, after they bid to operate the route without subsidies. Widerøe thereafter moved its technical base back to Florø. Danish Air Transport commenced a route from Florø to Stavanger Airport, Sola in 2012, but closed it down within months. It was followed up by Airwing, which commenced flights the following year, first to Stavanger and subsequently to Notodden Airport, Tuven.

== Facilities ==
Florø Airport is situated on a southern peninsula of the Florelandet, the island on which Florø is situated. The asphalt runway has physical dimensions 1,264 by 30 meters (4,147 by 98 ft) and is aligned 07/25. It has a takeoff run available (TORA) and a landing distance available (LDA) of 1,199 meters (3,934 ft). The airport is equipped with category 4 fire and rescue service.

The airport is situated five minutes drive from the town center. There is an hourly bus service operated by Firda Billag. Paid parking, taxis and car rental are available at the airport.

== Airlines and destinations ==
Scheduled services out of Florø are provided by Widerøe using the de Havilland Canada Dash 8 and Danish Air Transport using ATR42s. These were operated as public service obligations with the Ministry of Transport and Communications until April 2016. Following the COVID-19 pandemic, the route to Oslo became reincorporated in the PSO network again from October 2021. Bristow Helicopters operates helicopter flights to several oil platforms in the North Sea. Florø Airport served 200,356 passengers, 11,654 aircraft movements and handled 3 tonnes of cargo in 2014.

Florø Airport is also the base of a detachment of the Royal Norwegian Air Force’s 330 Squadron. The detachment carried out 149 search and rescue missions lasting 476 hours in 2013.

Airlines	Destinations
Widerøe	Bergen, Trondheim

== Statistics ==
Annual passenger traffic
Year	Passengers	% Change
2025	131,398	▼ -6.9%
2024	141,130	▼ -10.1%
2023	156,984	▲4.4%
2022	150,339	▲26.4%
2021	118,968	▲4.3%
2020	114,076	▼ -26.6%
2019	155,382	▲9.5%
2018	141,866	▲0.7%
2017	140,891	▼ -3.8%
2016	146,437	▼ -17.2%
2015	176,795	

== Future ==
Avinor is considering steps to expand the airport. It still has the inaugural terminal from 1971, which is in need of expansion. Additional apron space is also needed, as is car parking. Further extension of the runway is also being considered, either to 1,700 or 2,000 meters (5,600 or 6,600 ft). Either way the extension would be westwards. The sounds of Ausa and Furesundet would have to be filled and the two islands as well as Furøya leveled. Avinor has estimated the costs at about 200 million kroner.

Avinor has started a process to look at the airport structure in Vestland county. Early plans have looked at closing down Førde Airport, Bringeland, and possibly also Sandane Airport, Anda, while expanding the runway at Florø Airport to 2,000 meters (6,600 ft). This would allow for jetliners to operate from Florø to Oslo with significantly lower ticket prices and remove the need for subsidies. Previously, the Ministry of Transport and Communications has proposed closing Sandane Airport and splitting the traffic between Førde and Ørsta–Volda Airport, Hovden. The road distance from Sandane to Bringeland is 97 kilometers (60 mi),

== Bibliography ==
- Arnesen, Odd (1984). På grønne vinger over Norge (in Norwegian). Widerøe's Flyveselskap.
- Bråthen, Svein (2012). Mulige endringer i lufthavnstrukturen – Samfunnsøkonomi og ruteopplegg (PDF) (in Norwegian). Møreforskning. ISBN 978-82-7830-165-4. Archived from the original (PDF) on 24 April 2012.
- Svanberg, Erling (1990). Langs vei og lei i Nordland: samferdsel i Nordland gjennom 3000 år (in Norwegian). Nordland County Municipality. ISBN 82-7416-021-5.
