= Førde (town) =

Town in Vestland, Norway

- Town/City
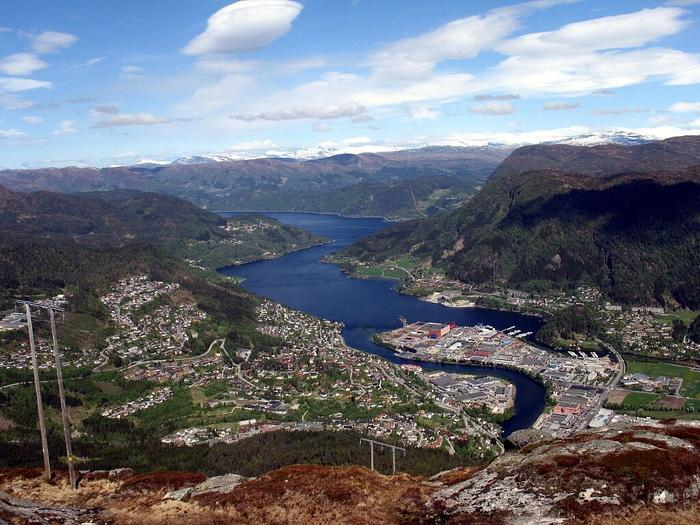
- View of the town
- Interactive map of Førde
- Location within Vestland Location within Norway
- Coordinates: 61.4522°N 5.8572°E
- Country: Norway
- Region: Western Norway
- County: Vestland
- District: Sunnfjord
- Municipality: Sunnfjord Municipality
- Established as
- Town (By): 1997

Area
  - Total: 5.91 km^{2} (2.28 sq mi)
- Elevation: 27 m (89 ft)

Population (2024)
  - Total: 10,697
  - Density: 1,810/km^{2} (4,700/sq mi)
- Demonyms: Førdianar; Førdianer; Førdsfjordinge
- Time zone: UTC+01:00 (CET)
  - Summer (DST): UTC+02:00 (CEST)
- Post Code: 6800 Førde

Førde is the administrative centre of Sunnfjord Municipality in Vestland county, Norway. The town is located at the eastern end of the Førdefjorden, at the mouth of the river Jølstra. The 5.91-square-kilometre (1,460-acre) town has a population (2024) of 10,697 and a population density of 1,810 inhabitants per square kilometre (4,700/sq mi).

The town of Førde is an important commercial, industrial, and government center for the area. The Øyrane area in the center of the town, along the harbor is the regional center for industry. The town also has the local primary and secondary schools, as well as a folk high school. Furthermore, one of the campuses of the Western Norway University of Applied Sciences is located in Førde. The Department of Engineering and Health Sciences have sections here. There is a branch of the county library in Førde as well as the Førde Central Hospital, owned by the Førde Health Trust. The regional hospital is the largest healthcare institution in the area and the biggest employer in the city. The regional newspaper, Firda, is based out of the town Førde. Førde Church is the main church for the town. There are two large shopping centers (shopping malls) in the city center: Elvetorget and Alti Førde.

The town sits at the intersection of the highways Rv.5 and E39. The Rv. 5 highway connects Førde to the nearby town of Florø (via the Naustdal Tunnel) and the E39 highway connects Førde with the cities of Ålesund to the north and Bergen to the south. The old Førde Airport, Øyrane was located in the center of the town at Øyrane, but that airport was only used from 1971 until 1986. The site was not optimal for an airport, and so a new Førde Airport was built about 15 kilometres (9.3 mi) south of the town (in Førde Municipality) in the nearby village of Bringeland which was actually located in neighboring Gaular Municipality (since 2020, both areas were part of Sunnfjord Municipality).

== History ==
The current town was the administrative centre of the old Førde Municipality which existed until 2020, when it became part of Sunnfjord Municipality. The town of Førde then became the administrative centre of the new Sunnfjord Municipality.

On 21 April 1965, the decision was made to develop Førde into a regional center . The Gerhardsen government at the time aimed to reduce the rate of migration from the countryside to the large cities. A total of nine locations were designated in the country, and Førde was one of those that were developed. Førde's population in 1951 was only 3,080, but by 1980, it had grown to 7,086. The town developed over a few decades and became the largest commercial and service center between Bergen and Ålesund.

In 1988 the city was called "Norway's ugliest city".

== Climate ==
Førde is one of the wettest towns in Norway. This is a result of orographic precipitation induced by the surrounding mountains. Winter is usually the wettest part of the year. A consistent layer of dry snow is rare in during winter, as rain-on-snow events are a regular occurrence. Temperatures above 20 °C are common during the summer as a result of the slightly inland location and Föhn winds from the surrounding mountains. The temperatures rapidly drop most days in the late afternoon as a result of the sea breeze coming in the fjord.

Climate data for Førde - Tefre 1991–2020 (64 m)
Month	Jan	Feb	Mar	Apr	May	Jun	Jul	Aug	Sep	Oct	Nov	Dec	Year
Mean daily maximum °C (°F)	2.5 (36.5)	2.6 (36.7)	5.4 (41.7)	10 (50)	14.5 (58.1)	17.7 (63.9)	20.1 (68.2)	19.4 (66.9)	15.5 (59.9)	10.1 (50.2)	5.3 (41.5)	2.6 (36.7)	10.5 (50.9)
Daily mean °C (°F)	−0.3 (31.5)	−0.7 (30.7)	1.5 (34.7)	5.2 (41.4)	9.2 (48.6)	12.7 (54.9)	14.9 (58.8)	14.3 (57.7)	10.8 (51.4)	6.1 (43.0)	2.4 (36.3)	−0.1 (31.8)	6.3 (43.4)
Mean daily minimum °C (°F)	−3 (27)	−3.5 (25.7)	−1.8 (28.8)	1 (34)	4.3 (39.7)	8 (46)	11 (52)	10.6 (51.1)	7.6 (45.7)	3.5 (38.3)	0 (32)	−3 (27)	2.9 (37.3)
Average precipitation mm (inches)	250.1 (9.85)	221.3 (8.71)	209.4 (8.24)	121.4 (4.78)	103.7 (4.08)	118.4 (4.66)	135.4 (5.33)	141.8 (5.58)	205.8 (8.10)	230.9 (9.09)	255.2 (10.05)	288.1 (11.34)	2,281.5 (89.81)
Average precipitation days (≥ 1.0 mm)	21	19	21	18	18	19	20	20	20	22	21	22	241
Source: NOAA WMO averages 91-2020 Norway

== Media gallery ==
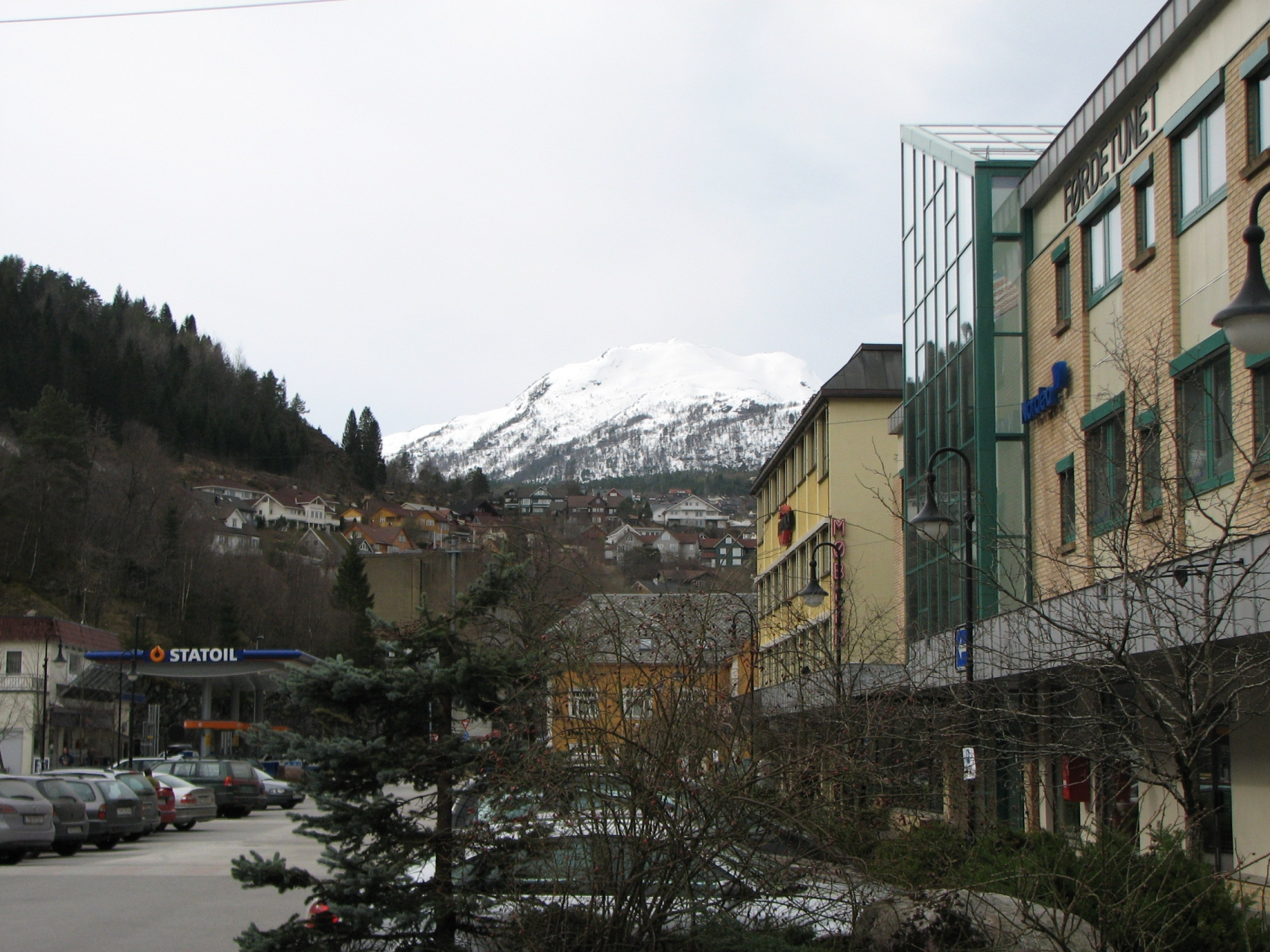
The town of Førde

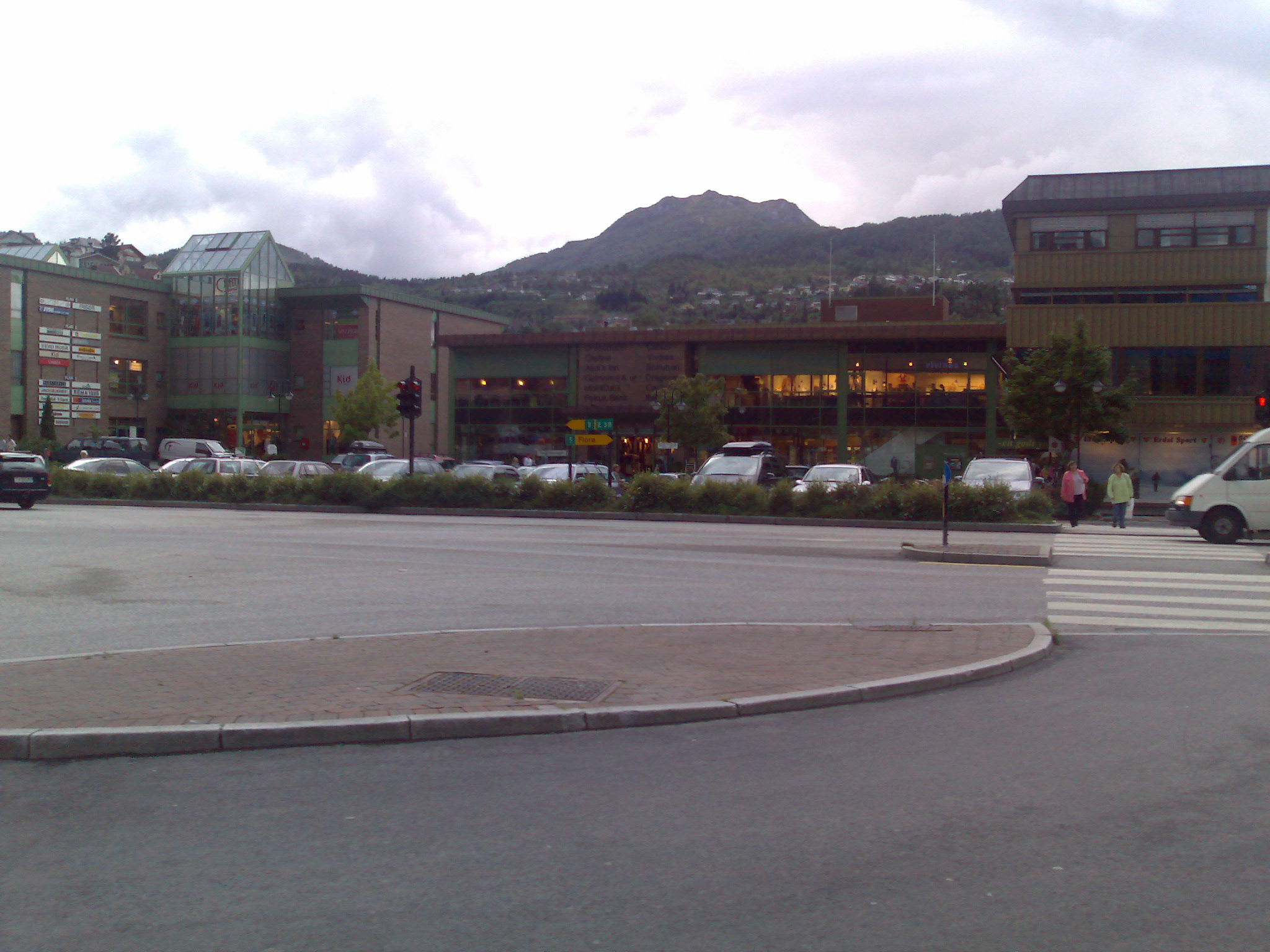
Downtown Førde

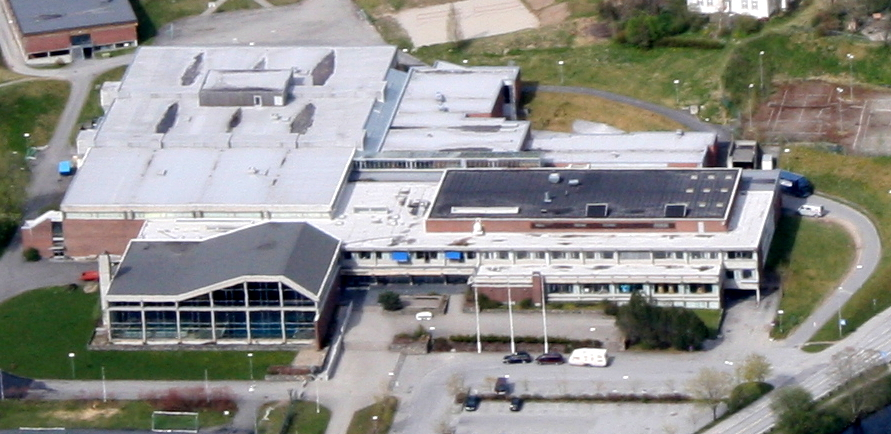
Førdehuset, a regional cultural centre

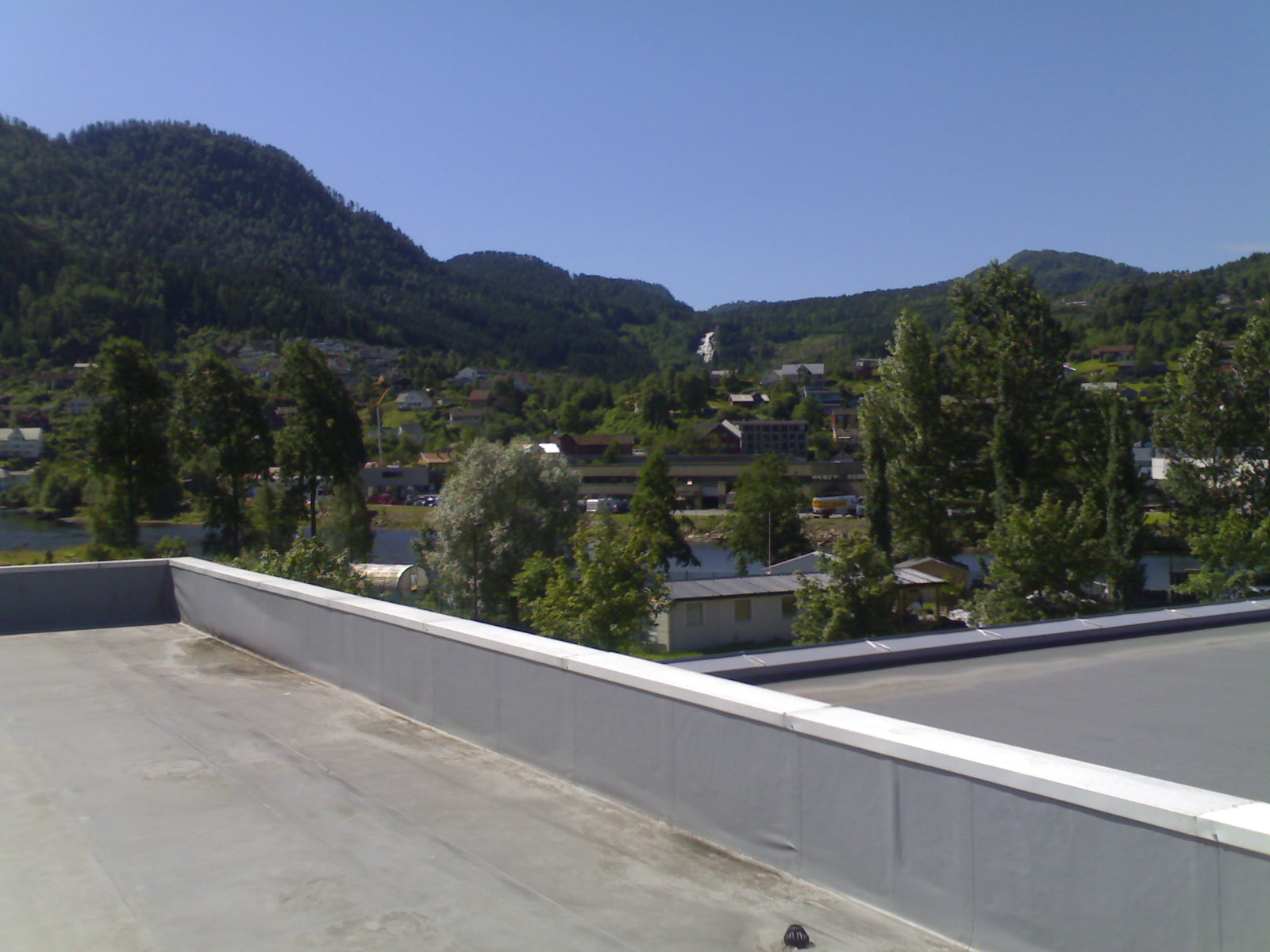
View of a residential area

== See also ==
- List of towns and cities in Norway
