= SS Gjøa =

History

Norway
- Name: Gjøa
- Owner: Harald Eie
- Operator: Harald Eie
- Builder: J. L. Thompson & Sons, Sunderland
- Yard number: 449
- Launched: 29 November 1906
- Commissioned: January 1907
- Home port: Bergen
- Identification: Call sign MDCB
- Fate: Wrecked, 24 February 1907

General characteristics
- Type: Cargo ship
- Tonnage: 3,645 GRT; 2,364 NRT; 6,200 DWT
- Length: 346 ft 5 in (105.59 m)
- Beam: 50 ft 8 in (15.44 m)
- Depth: 22 ft 9 in (6.93 m)
- Installed power: 307 Nhp
- Propulsion: J. Dickinson & Sons 3-cylinder triple expansion
- Speed: 11.0 knots

Gjøa was a steam cargo ship built in 1906 by the J. L. Thompson & Sons of Sunderland for Harald Eie of Bergen.

== Design and construction ==
The ship was laid down in 1906 at J. L. Thompson & Sons North Sands shipyard in Sunderland. The vessel was launched on 29 November 1906 (yard number 449), and after successful completion of sea trials the ship was delivered to her owner in January 1907.

As built, the ship was 346 feet 5 inches (105.59 m) long (between perpendiculars) and 50 feet 8 inches (15.44 m) abeam, a mean draft of 22 feet 9 inches (6.93 m). Gjøa was assessed at 3,645 GRT, 2,364 NRT and 6,200 DWT. The vessel had a steel hull, and a single 307 nhp triple-expansion steam engine, with cylinders of 24 1/2-inch (62 cm), 40-inch (100 cm), and 66-inch (170 cm) diameter with a 45-inch (110 cm) stroke, that drove a single screw propeller, and moved the ship at up to 11.0 knots (12.7 mph; 20.4 km/h).

== Operational history ==
After delivery Gjøa was immediately chartered to transport cargo to South America. The ship left Sunderland for her maiden voyage on January 19, 1907, and arrived at Port Talbot on January 23 for loading. £40,000 worth of dynamite and coal were loaded onto her here, and the vessel sailed from Port Talbot on February 7 for Iquique. The ship called at Madeira on February 17 and continued on to her destination via Cape Verde Islands.

On February 24, 1907 Gjøa ran aground on a reef off the island of Maio. Over the next two weeks all of her cargo of dynamite was discharged and safely stored in Praia, except for 600 tons that had to be jettisoned. By then the ship had water in all her holds, and had her bottom seriously damaged. All attempts to refloat her proved to be unsuccessful, and due to being in an exposed position she eventually broke up and was abandoned in early April.
