= Sogndal Airport =

Sogndal Airport Sogndal lufthavn

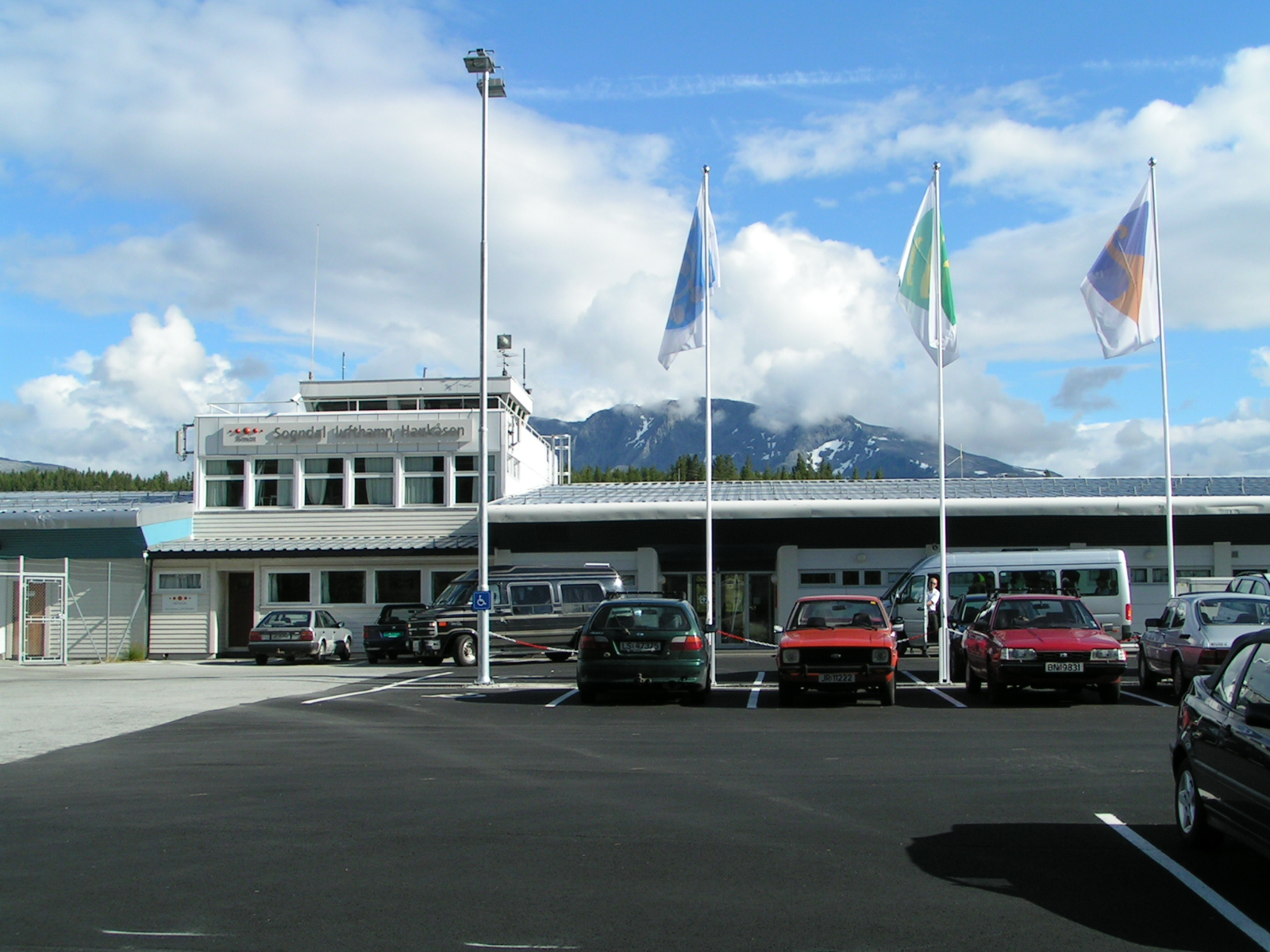
- IATA: SOG; ICAO: ENSG

Summary
- Airport type: Public
- Owner/Operator: Avinor
- Serves: Sogndal Municipality, Norway
- Location: Haukåsen, Sogndal
- Elevation AMSL: 498 m / 1,633 ft
- Coordinates: 61°09′26″N 007°08′17″E
- Website: avinor.no

Map
- Location of the airport SOG (Norway)

Runways
Direction	Length		Surface
Direction	m	ft	Surface
06/24	1,110	3,642	Asphalt

Statistics (2014)
- Passengers: 70,244
- Aircraft movements: 5,735
- Cargo (tonnes): 5

Sogndal Airport (Norwegian: Sogndal lufthavn; IATA: SOG, ICAO: ENSG) is a regional airport serving Sogndal Municipality and the surrounding area in Vestland, Norway. It is situated at Haukåsen, 10 kilometers (6.2 mi) from Kaupanger and 20 kilometers (12 mi) from Sogndalsfjøra. It serves the whole Sogn district. The airport consists of a 1,180-meter (3,870 ft) runway aligned 06/24. Services are provided by Widerøe on public service obligation with the Ministry of Transport and Communications. The airport is owned and operated by the state-owned Avinor and served 70,244 passengers in 2014.

The airport opened on 1 July 1971 along with three other regional airports in Sogn og Fjordane and Sunnmøre. These were at first connected to Bergen and Ålesund using the de Havilland Canada DHC-6 Twin Otter. From the 1980s the airport was upgraded and de Havilland Canada Dash 7 started being used, allowing all-year services to Oslo.

== History ==
A government commission, led by Erik Himle and later Preben Munthe, was appointed in 1962 to consider additional airports in Norway. The Sud Aviation Caravelle was about to the phased into use on the main domestic routes and the committee recommended in 1964 that nine new airports be built which could serve jetliners, including an airport in Florø to serve Sogn og Fjordane. Widerøe launched an alternative proposal and suggested that a network of smaller airports be built instead, which could be served using short take-off and landing aircraft, which were being developed at the time. Smaller airports could be built and operated at lower cost than larger airports, but both airports and airlines would need subsidies to operate. Håkon Kyllingmark was appointed Minister of Transport and Communications in 1965 and was a proponent of the STOLport proposal. The political rationale was that, despite that the total operating costs would rise, it would provide better services to rural areas and thus keep up their population.

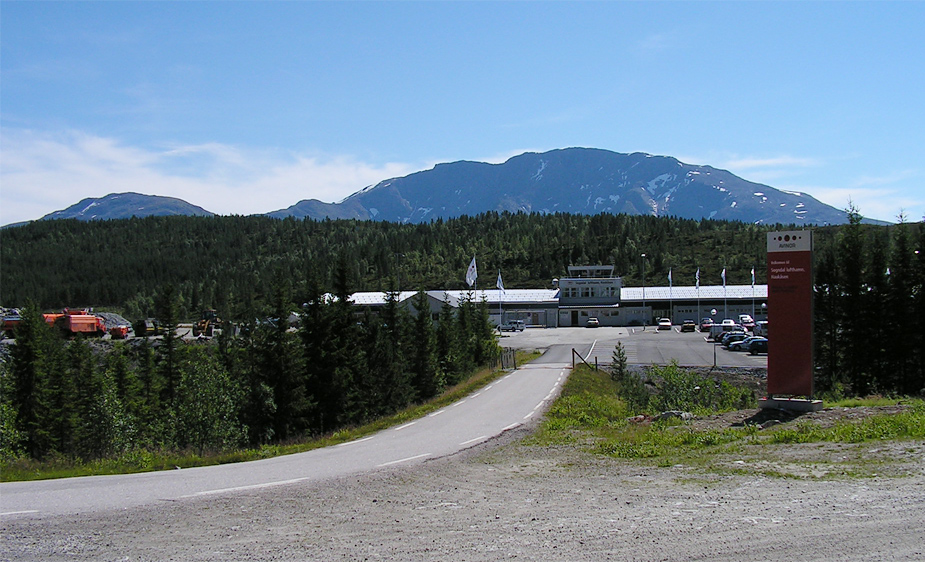
Road to the airport

As an alternative location for the airport to serve Sogn, Høyanger Municipality was also considered and test flights were flown there. Also Gaupne was considered by an industrial conglomerate led by Aker, although also these plans were shelved. Haukåsen was therefore selected as the site of the airport. Mayor of Sogndal, Nils Knagenhjelm, offered a free section of land at Haukåsen if the airport was located there. He had built a road to the area in the 1960s. The terms were accepted and the land and the road were taken over by the airport at the time of the aerodrome's completion.

The regional airports only received a simple terminal and an 800-meter (2,600 ft) runway. The first such airports were opened in Helgeland in 1968. This was deeded sufficiently successful that Parliament approved the second stage in 1969, consisting of four airports in Northwestern Norway. In addition to Sogndal, these consisted of Førde Airport, Øyrane; Florø Airport and Ørsta–Volda Airport, Hovden. All four airports opened on 1 July 1971.

The airport initially consisted of an integrated terminal and works building with a control tower. Sogndal Airport received a runway measuring 800 by 30 meters (2,625 by 98 ft) and an apron measuring 70 by 45 meters (230 by 148 ft). Services were provided by Widerøe, which operated the 19-seat de Havilland Canada DHC-6 Twin Otter to Bergen Airport, Flesland and Ålesund Airport, Vigra.

The road to the airport was frequently closed and in 1978 a dorm was built to allow the employees to overnight should they get caught by a blizzard. A new fire station was built in the early 1980s. This allowed Widerøe to introduce the de Havilland Canada Dash 7 on the route from Florø and Sogndal to Oslo Airport, Fornebu in September 1983. This was followed up with a new and larger terminal and the renovation of the tower in 1985. Widerøe replaced its Twin Otters and Dash 7s with the de Havilland Canada Dash 8 in the early 1990s.

Ownership of the airport passed from Sogndal Municipality to the Civil Aviation Administration (later renamed Avinor) on 1 January 1997. Airport security was introduced on 1 January 2005. The airport was upgraded between 2004 and 2007 with expanded safety areas, lights, land- and air-side parking, a new arrival terminal, navigational system and additional garage space.

== Facilities ==
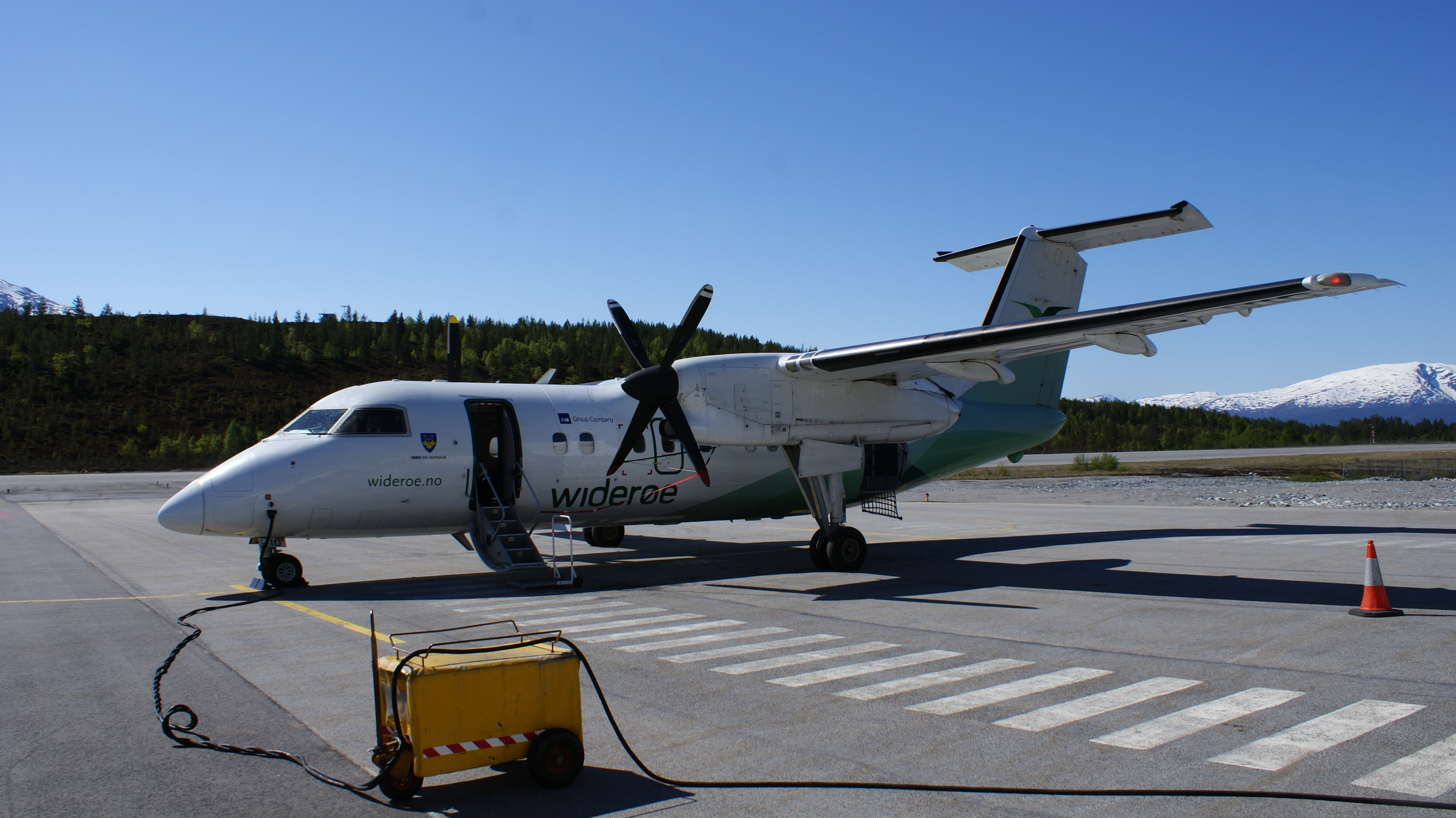
Widerøe de Havilland Canada Dash 8-103 at Sogndal Airport

Sogndal Airport is situated in the heights of the Haukåsen in Sogndal, situated 10 kilometers (6.2 mi) from Kaupanger and 20 kilometers (12 mi) from Sogndalsfjæra. It is the sole airport serving the district of Sogn. It has a reference elevation of 498 meters (1,366 ft) above mean sea level, on a ledge close to the Sognefjord. The asphalt runway physically measures 1,110 by 30 meters (3,642 by 98 ft) and is aligned 06/24. It has a takeoff run available (TORA) of 930 meters (3,050 ft) on runway 06 and 1,000 meters (3,300 ft) on runway 24, and a landing distance available (LDA) of 870 meters (2,850 ft). The airport is equipped with category 4 fire and rescue service.

The airport is situated twenty minutes drive from the town center. There is an airport coach service operated by Nettbuss. Paid parking, taxis and car rental are available at the airport. The road (although in part obscured by forest) is quite beautiful, located 400 meters (1,300 ft) above the Sognefjord, with a view over the 1,717-meter-high (5,633 ft) mountain Bleia on the other side (best seen from 61.176033°N 7.175654°E).

== Airlines and destinations ==
Widerøe provides the only scheduled services at Sogndal Airport. They are operated as public service obligation with the Ministry of Transport and Communications and are flown with Dash 8-100 aircraft. Virtually all passengers travel either to Oslo and Bergen, of which three-quarters travel to the former.

Operation of the airport ran at a deficit of NOK 22 million in 2012. In addition the routes are subsidies at a cost of NOK 329 per passenger for the . Sogndal Airport served 70,244 passengers, 5,735 aircraft movements and handled 5 tonnes of cargo.

Airlines	Destinations
Widerøe	Bergen, Oslo, Sandane, Ørsta-Volda

== Statistics ==
Annual passenger traffic
Year	Passengers	% Change
2025	88,923	▼ -2.1%
2024	90,792	▼ -2.6%
2023	93,254	▲4.8%
2022	88,961	▲43.3%
2021	62,099	▲11.8%
2020	55,526	▼ -32.0%
2019	81,682	▼ -5.2%
2018	86,148	▼ -5.5%
2017	91,145	▲1.4%
2016	89,874	▲4.5%
2015	86,023	

== Bibliography ==
- Arnesen, Odd (1984). På grønne vinger over Norge (in Norwegian). Widerøe's Flyveselskap.
- Svanberg, Erling (1990). Langs vei og lei i Nordland: samferdsel i Nordland gjennom 3000 år (in Norwegian). Nordland County Municipality. ISBN 82-7416-021-5.
