= Gjøa oilfield =

Oilfield in North Sea

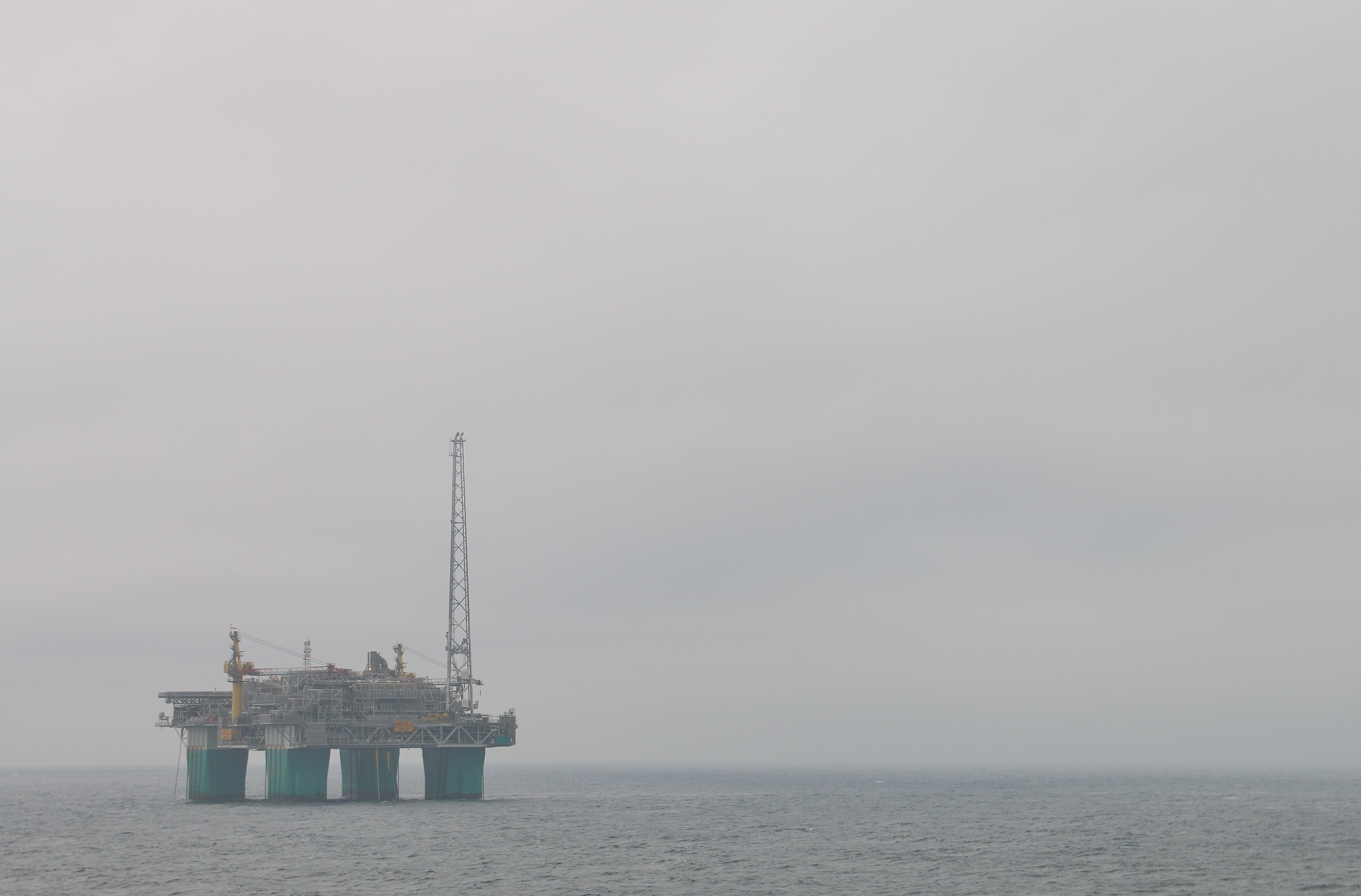

- Location within North Sea
- Country: Norway
- Region: North Sea
- Offshore/onshore: offshore
- Coordinates: 61°19′56.51″N 3°53′48.55″E
- Operator: ENGIE
- Partners: ENGIE; Petoro; SA OKEA; Wintershall Dea

Field history
- Discovery: 1989
- Start of development: 2007
- Start of production: 2010

Production
- Estimated oil in place: 83 million barrels (~1.1×10^{7} t)
- Estimated gas in place: 40×10^{9} m^{3} (1.4×10^{12} cu ft)

Gjøa oilfield is an oilfield in the Norwegian section of the North Sea. It lies about 70 kilometres (43 mi) off the Troll field.

The Gjøa reserves are estimated to be about 40 billion cubic metres of natural gas and 83 million barrels (13.2×10^{6} m^{3}) of oil and condensate.

The oil field was discovered in 1989 and the development was announced in December 2006. It was developed by the consortium of Statoil, ENGIE, Petoro, Royal Dutch Shell and RWE Dea. During the development phase, the operator of the field was Statoil. Once production began in 2010, ENGIE took over the operatorship. The field came on stream in November 2010, and it reached plateau production in 2013. The total investment is about 27 billion Norwegian kroners. In 2018 A/S Norske Shell sold its interest to Norwegian SA OKEA.

The gas produced at Gjøa is transported through the FLAGS pipeline to the St Fergus Gas Terminal in Scotland. Gjøa is connected to the FLAGS pipeline through the 130-kilometre (81 mi) 28-inch (710 mm) link built by Saipem. The linking pipeline was laid by the Castoro Sei vessel. Oil is exported through the 55-kilometre (34 mi) 16-inch (410 mm) link to the Troll II trunkline, and onwards to the Mongstad Refinery north of Bergen. The gas field came on stream in November 2010.

Gjøa semi-submersible floating production platform is also linked with the Vega and Vega South fields development.

Gjøa semi-submersible floating production platform was designed by Aker Solutions Engineering in 2006–2010.
