= Ørsta–Volda Airport =

Ørsta–Volda Airport Ørsta–Volda lufthamn

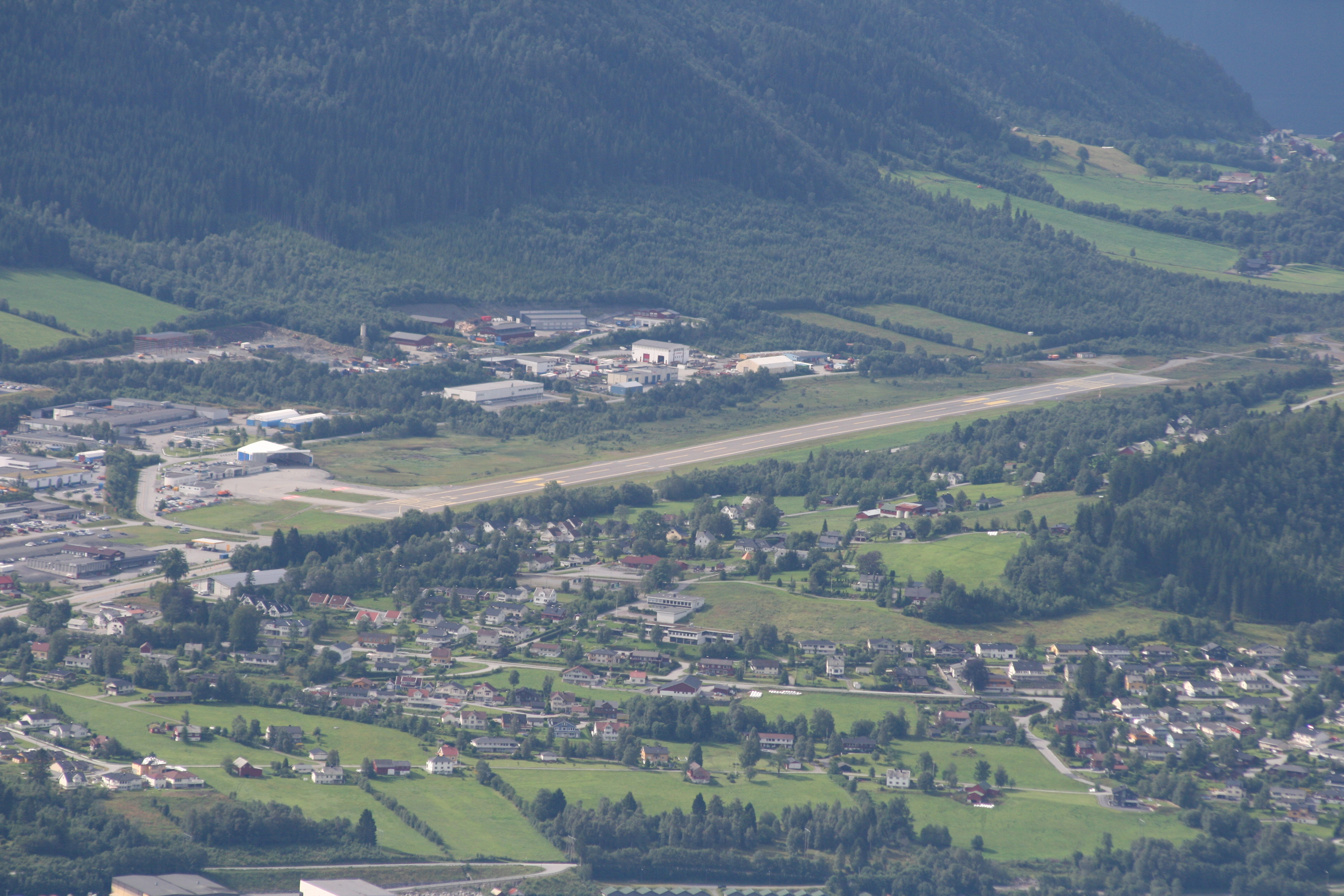
- IATA: HOV; ICAO: ENOV

Summary
- Airport type: Public
- Operator: Avinor
- Serves: Ørsta and Volda
- Location: Hovdebygda, Ørsta, Norway
- Elevation AMSL: 74 m (243 ft)
- Coordinates: 62°10′43″N 006°04′33″E
- Website: avinor.no

Map
- Location in Norway

Runways
Direction	Length		Surface
Direction	m	ft	Surface
06/24	1,070	3,510	Asphalt

Statistics (2014)
- Passengers: 121,021
- Aircraft movements: 6,294
- Cargo (tonnes): 2

Ørsta–Volda Airport (Nynorsk: Ørsta–Volda lufthamn; IATA: HOV, ICAO: ENOV) is a regional airport situated at Hovden (Hovdebygda), in Ørsta Municipality in Møre og Romsdal county, Norway, midway between the urban villages of Ørsta and Volda. The airport features a 1,070-metre (3,510 ft) asphalt runway aligned 06/24. Services are provided by Widerøe using their de Havilland Canada Dash 8 as a public service obligation. Owned and operated by the state-owned Avinor, the airport handled 160,135 passengers in 2025.

Hovden opened on 1 July 1971 as a municipal airport having cost 5.9 million Norwegian krone (NOK). Until 1993 Widerøe served it using the de Havilland Canada Twin Otter as a feeder service to Ålesund Airport, Vigra. The de Havilland Canada Dash 7 was used from 1985 to 1987. During the early years, the airport had very poor regularity and was proposed closed. Terminal upgrades were carried out in 1988 and the runway extended in the early 2000s. Since the 2008 opening of the Eiksund Tunnel and the 2012 opening of the Kviven Tunnel, Hovden has significantly increased its catchment area and now covers a population of 60,000 in southern Sunnmøre and Nordfjord. This had led to a tripling of ridership.

== History ==
The first aviation in Volda took place in 1935 when Gidsken Jakobsen demonstrated flights. The first airport in Sunnmøre and Møre og Romsdal was Ålesund Airport, Vigra, which opened on 7 June 1958. For the southern parts of Sunnmøre, the airport incurred a travel time of two to three hours, including two ferries. Møre og Romsdal Fylkesbåtar introduced a hovercraft service from Ørsta via Hareid to Ålesund and Vigra in April 1965. Travel time from Ørsta to the airport was 50 minutes. By the time of the fall storms the authorities withdrew the operating certificate due to safety concerns.

Following a 1962 government commission investigating the construction of new airports, Widerøe launched an alternative proposal and suggested that a network of smaller airports be built instead. These could be served using short take-off and landing aircraft, which were being developed at the time. Smaller airports could be built and operated at lower cost than larger airports, but both airports and airlines would need subsidies to operate. Håkon Kyllingmark was appointed Minister of Transport and Communications in 1965 and was a proponent of the STOLport proposal. The political rationale was that, despite that the total operating costs would rise, it would provide better services to rural areas and thus keep up their population.

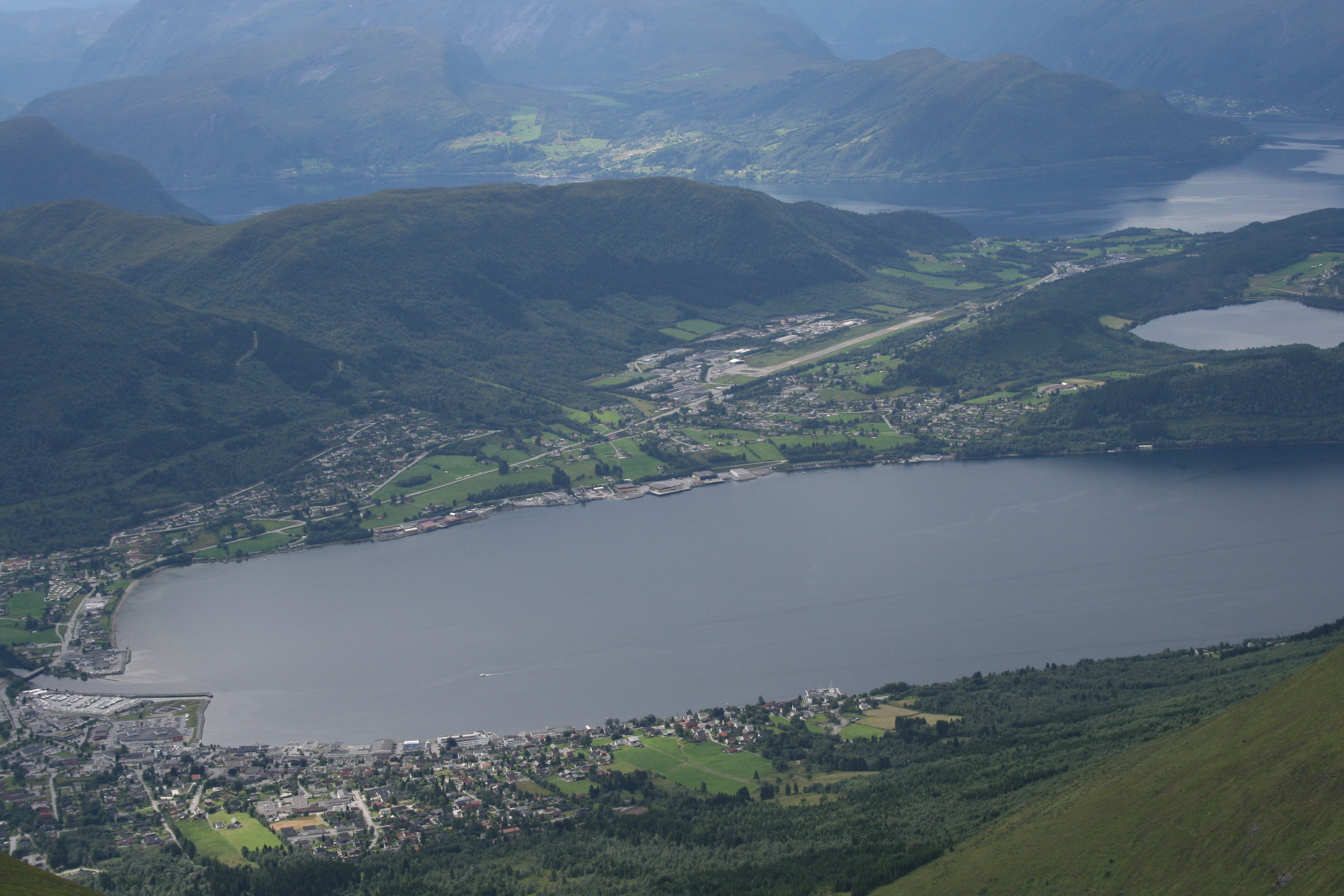
The airport in its surroundings. Ørsta is situated closest to the left in the images. Volda is not visible and is situated behind the hill to the left of the airport.

The regional airports only received a simple terminal and an 800-metre (2,600 ft) runway. The first such airports were opened in Helgeland in 1968. Planning in Ørsta and Volda commenced in February 1968, with the appointment of an inter-municipal commission. It concluded that a side on the shore of Hovdentjønna, a small lake, was a suitable site. It was estimated to cost NOK 1.5 million. The plans were approved by Parliament on 12 June 1969. In addition to Ørsta–Volda, these consisted of Førde Airport, Øyrane; Florø Airport and Sogndal Airport, Haukåsen.

The time until completion was set to two years and the responsibility was placed with the municipalities. The municipal councils approved the plans in early 1970 and an operating concession was granted by the government on 3 July. Construction was placed under the auspice of a committee with three representatives from each municipality and a representative from Møre og Romsdal County Municipality. The airport originally consisted of an 800-by-30-metre (2,625 by 98 ft) runway and an apron measuring 70 by 35 metres (230 by 115 ft). Navigation was provided by two radio beacons. Of the investment of NOK 5.3 million, the Ministry of Transport and Communications granted 2.97 million, the county 0.5 million and the remaining 1.8 million was loan.

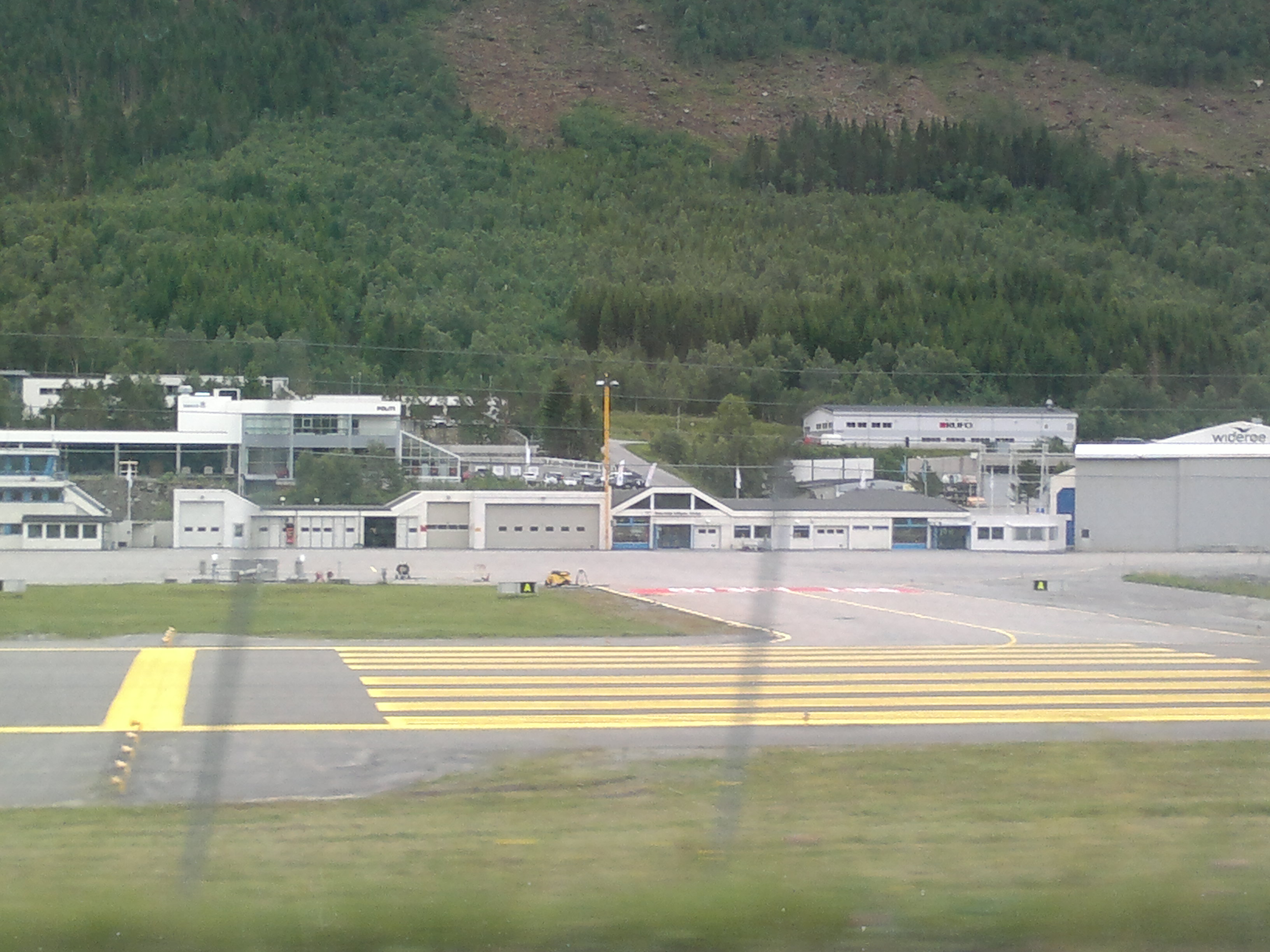
The terminal building

Operating costs were covered by the two municipalities in the ratio of their population, initially nine sixteenth for Ørsta and seven sixteenths for Volda. The airport was run by an inter-municipal board and subordinate to the municipal engineer in Ørsta. The four airports opened on 1 July 1971. Ørsta–Volda Airport was one of three airports in Møre og Romsdal to open within two years. Kristiansund Airport, Kvernberget opened on 30 June 1970 and Molde Airport, Årø opened on 5 April 1972. This led to a dramatic reduction in services out of Vigra.

The original service from Hovden was a feeder service to Vigra operated by Widerøe with their 19-seat Twin Otters. In the first full year of operation the airport handled 8,835 passengers. During the first years the airport had notoriously poor regularity, and in the last quarter of 1972 half the flights were canceled. A contribution was the high 610 meters (2,000 ft) runway visual range. There were discussions of closing Hovden and Sandane Airport, Anda and replacing them with an airport at Markane in Stryn Municipality, although this was never carried out.

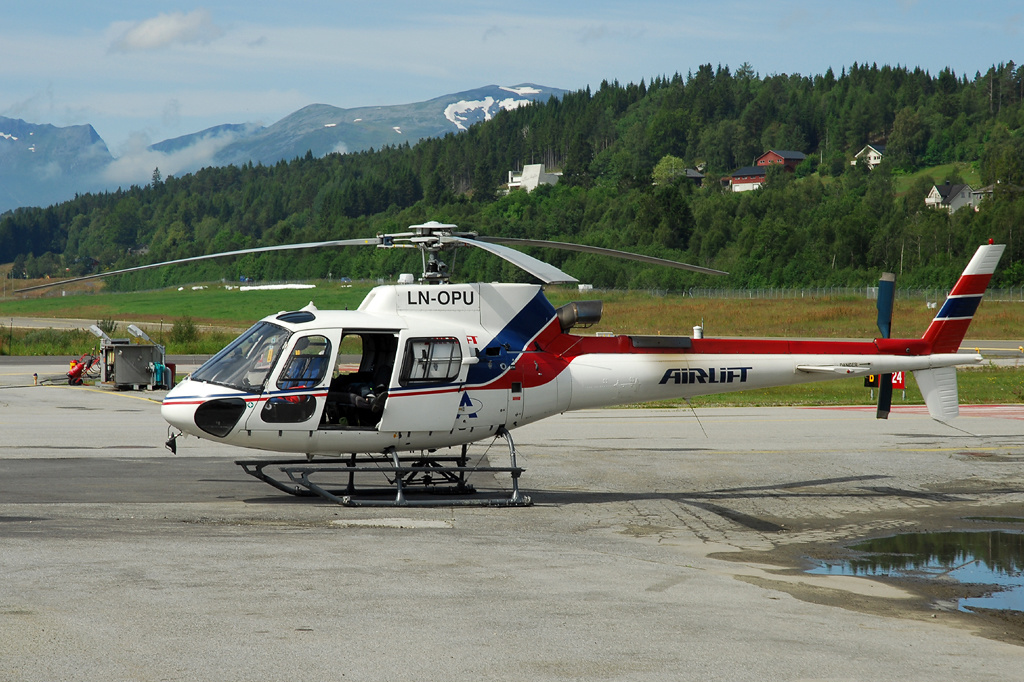
Eurocopter AS 350 of Airlift at Hovden

Widerøe introduced the 50-passenger de Havilland Canada Dash 7 on some routes between 1985 and 1988. There were 18,138 passengers in 1985 and 24,150 two years later. This and the use of the Dash 7 caused the terminal to be upgraded in 1988. New navigational aids were installed in 1987, including a localizer and a new radio beacon, lowering the visual range to 550 meters (1,800 ft). Further improvements were made with the new runway lighting in 1989. The Twin Otters were in 1993 replaced with Dash 8-100s. With this the flights to Ålesund were terminated and instead flights to Oslo Airport, Fornebu and Bergen Airport, Flesland were introduced. From 1997 Widerøe built a hangar at Hovden, allowing it to have a night stop there. This further helped regularity.

Ownership of the airport passed to the Civil Aviation Administration (later renamed Avinor) on 1 January 1997. The runway was extended in both directions in the early 2000s. Airport security was introduced on 1 January 2005. Hovden saw 51,000 passengers in 2008. With the opening of the Eiksund Tunnel that year Ulstein, Herøy and Hareid were all given a fixed link to the airport. This gave a large increase in use of the airport, hitting 100,000 passengers in 2011. The 2012 opening of the Kviv Tunnel brought the airport even closer to Nordfjord and Hovden started capturing patronage from Sandane Airport, Anda. This has been sufficient for Avinor to consider the closing of Anda. Combined these two road projects have tripled the airport's catchment area.

== Facilities ==
Ørsta–Volda Airport is situated in Hovebygda in Ørsta, Norway. Its catchment area covers the southern parts of Sunnmøre and parts of Nordfjord. It has a reference elevation of 74 meters (243 ft) above mean sea level. The asphalt runway physically measures 1,110 by 30 meters (3,642 by 98 ft) and is aligned 06/24. It has a takeoff run available (TORA) of 930 meters (3,050 ft) on runway 06 and 1,000 meters (3,300 ft) on runway 24, and a landing distance available (LDA) of 870 meters (2,850 ft). The airport is equipped with category 4 fire and rescue service. There are 16 Avinor employees at the airport, consisting of five in the aerodrome flight information service and nine in the ground services.

== Airlines and destinations ==
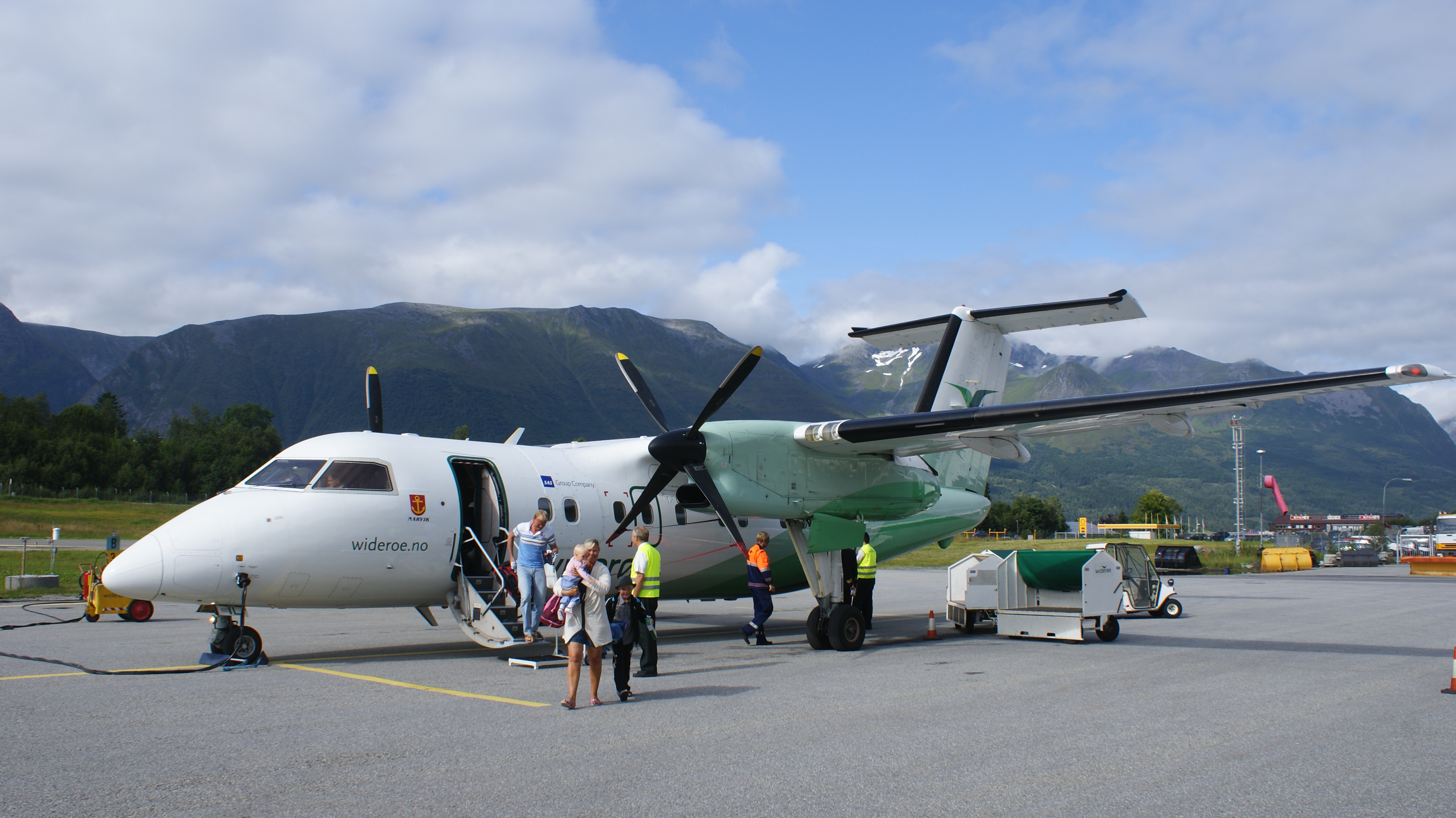
Widerøe de Havilland Canada Dash-8 103 at Ørsta–Volda Airport

All services at the airport are operated by Widerøe with their fleet of de Havilland Canada Dash 8-100 aircraft. These are public service obligations subsidized by the Ministry of Transport and Communications. There are five daily flights to Oslo, one daily flight to Bergen and two daily services to Sogndal, some of which continue to Bergen.

Operation of the airport ran at a deficit of NOK 22 million in 2012. In addition the routes are subsidized at a cost of NOK 279 per passenger. Hovden served 121,021 passengers, 6,294 aircraft movements and handled 2 tonnes of cargo.

Airlines	Destinations
Widerøe	Bergen, Oslo, Sogndal; Seasonal: Sandane

== Statistics ==
Annual passenger traffic
Year	Passengers	% Change
2025	160,135	▲13.0%
2024	141,705	▲45.4%
2023	97,486	▼ -5.7%
2022	103,418	▲43.4%
2021	72,121	▲23.6%
2020	58,337	▼ -46.5%
2019	109,060	▼ -5.1%
2018	114,922	▲3.3%
2017	111,278	▲6.4%
2016	104,627	▼ -9.0%
2015	115,009	

== Ground transport ==
Fram operates a local bus service between Ørsta and Volda every half-hour during the day and every hour during the evening. It stops at a bus stop seven minutes walk from the airport terminal. Paid parking, taxis and car rental are available at the airport. The airport is situated on the E39, five minutes driving from both Ørsta and Volda.

== Bibliography ==
- Arnesen, Odd (1984). På grønne vinger over Norge (in Norwegian). Widerøe's Flyveselskap.
- Hjelle, Bjørn Owe (2007). Ålesund lufthavn Vigra (in Norwegian). Valderøya. ISBN 978-82-92055-28-1.
- Olsen-Hagen, Bernt; Gulstad, Anne Blix; Gynnild, Olav (2012). Ørsta-Volda lufthamn, Hovden – Dokumentasjon for arkivmessig bevaring (PDF) (in Norwegian). Norwegian Aviation Museum. Archived (PDF) from the original on 15 January 2015.
- Svanberg, Erling (1990). Langs vei og lei i Nordland: samferdsel i Nordland gjennom 3000 år (in Norwegian). Nordland County Municipality. ISBN 82-7416-021-5.
- Tjomsland, Audun; Wilsberg, Kjell (1995). Braathens SAFE 50 år: Mot alle odds. Oslo. ISBN 82-990400-1-9.
