= Førde Airport, Øyrane =

Defunct airport in Øyrane, Norway

Førde Airport, Øyrane Førde lufthavn, Øyrane
- IATA: FDE; ICAO: ENFD

Summary
- Airport type: Public
- Operator: Førde Municipality
- Serves: Førde, Norway
- Location: Øyrane, Førde, Sogn og Fjordane, Norway
- Elevation AMSL: 7 ft / 2 m
- Coordinates: 61°27′28″N 005°50′02″E

Map
- Location in Norway FDE (Norway)

Runways
Direction	Length		Surface
Direction	m	ft	Surface
14–32	790	2,590	Asphalt

Førde Airport, Øyrane (IATA: FDE, ICAO: ENFD; Norwegian: Førde lufthavn, Øyrane) was a regional airport located at Øyrane in Førde Municipality, Norway. The municipal airport first opened as a water aerodrome, receiving a runway in 1970. Scheduled services started the following year, with Widerøe providing flights to Bergen with the de Havilland Canada DHC-6 Twin Otter. In addition, Førdefly and Airlift operated general aviation services from the airport. Førde Airport, Øyrane was located in the middle of an industrial area and had severe safety shortcomings, such as lacking an instrument landing system and had a control tower without sight of the entire runway. Øyrane was therefore replaced with Førde Airport, Bringeland in 1986.

== History ==
Large-scale construction of airports in Norway started in the 1950s, largely funded by the North Atlantic Treaty Organization (NATO). Bergen Airport, Flesland opened in 1955, followed by Ålesund Airport, Vigra in 1958. The first plans for an airport in Sunnfjord were launched by Engineer Arne Bengtsen, who proposed building an airfield in Florø and having Vestlandske Luftfartsselskap operate to it using the Scottish Aviation Twin Pioneer. Construction started in 1956, but was halted after the airline could not guarantee operations during winter.

A committee, led by Erik Himle and later Preben Munthe, was appointed in 1962 to consider additional airports in Norway. The Sud Aviation Caravelle was about to be phased into use on the main domestic routes and the committee recommended in 1964 that nine new airports that could serve jetliners be built, including one airport in Florø. Widerøe came with an alternative proposal and suggested that a network of smaller airports be built instead, which could be served using short take-off and landing aircraft, which were being developed at the time. Smaller airports could be built and operated at lower cost than larger airports, but both airports and airlines would need subsidies to operate. Håkon Kyllingmark was appointed Minister of Transport and Communications in 1965 and was a proponent of the STOLport proposal. The political rationale was that, despite that the total operating costs would rise, it would provide better services to rural areas and thus keep up their population.

The regional airports only received a simple terminal and an 800-meter (2,600 ft) runway. The first such airports were opened in Helgeland in 1968. Førde was declared as a "center of growth" in 1965, which resulted in a series of public agencies and industrial enterprises being built in the town. The selection of Førde was tied to its central location within Sogn og Fjordane, as it was within a two-hour drive from nearly the entire county. Immediately after the appointment, the Industrial Development Corporation of Norway started establishing an industrial facility at Øyrane. An industrial park opened 1968, which included a shipyard. The surplus earthwork from dredging the port facilities was used to fill in land for a runway. The process went so quickly that the municipal council had not made a formal decision to build the airport before the groundwork was completed.

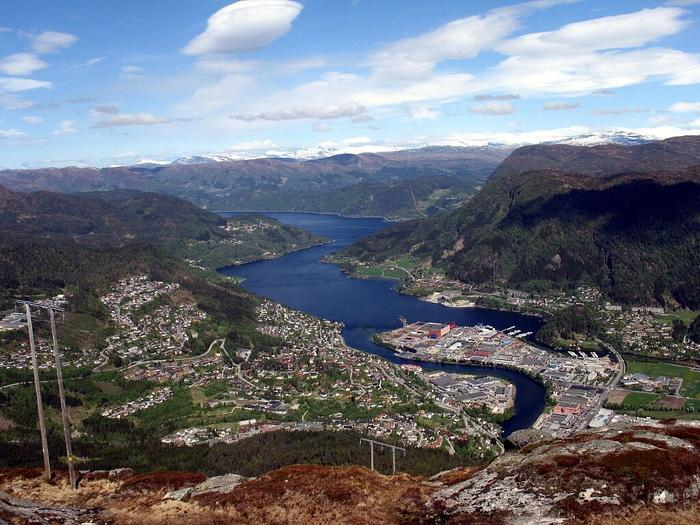
Øyrane is the peninsula with the industrial complex between the river and the bay.

Andreas Hjelmeland established Førdefly in 1966 as the second airline based in Sogn og Fjordane. Førdefly never received a concession to operate scheduled services; instead it flew a daily charter flight to Bergen Airport. The airline established a water aerodrome at Øyrane at the mouth of the river Jølstra. The aerodrome had a passenger and freight terminal, a quay, a hangar and a control tower. The municipality received permission from the Ministry of Transport and Communications in mid 1970 to operate a municipal airport, and chose to use the terminal facilities operated by Førdefly. Construction of the runway cost 1.3 million Norwegian krone and the first aircraft landed on the strip on 14 July 1970. Scheduled services commenced on 1 July 1971, the same day as Florø Airport, Sogndal Airport, Haukåsen, and Ørsta–Volda Airport, Hovden, also opened.

From before the airport was built it was evident that the location was not well suited, and planning of an alternative location for the airport began in 1968. The main concern was that the airport lacked an instrument landing system and could thus only be used during daylight and good weather. The first alternative location proposal was for Langelandsåsen, but was discarded by the Civil Aviation Administration because of the poor weather conditions. Later proposals were Espelandsmyrene and then Alværa on the Sognefjord. By 1972, the CAA had concluded that there probably was not a suitable location for an airport near Førde and recommended that the town instead by served by Florø Airport, located 70 kilometers (43 mi) away.

Bringelandsåsen, located 16 kilometers (10 mi) south of town, in the neighboring Gaular Municipality, was proposed by the CAA in 1974. Plans were developed, and in 1983 the Ministry of Transport and Communications recommended that Øyrane be closed and replaced with an all-new airport at Bringeland. Construction started in 1985 and the new airport opened on 31 August 1986, taking over all scheduled traffic. The helicopter operator Airlift was established in 1986 and was based at Øyrane until 1988, when it also moved to Bringeland. The terminal building at Øyrane remains, including the control tower and wharfs, although the runway and taxiway have been demolished to make way for industry. A small part of the runway close to the marina remains as a parking lot.

== Facilities ==
Førde Airport, Øyrane was located in the industrial area Øyrane, immediately west of the town center of Førde. The terminal facilities were located on the shore of the river of Jølstra and consisted of a control tower, a passenger terminal, a hangar for Førdefly and a wharf used by the seaplanes. The airport was owned by Førde Municipality. It consisted of a single 790-by-30-meter (2,592 by 98 ft) asphalt runway aligned 14–32 and with an 85-meter (279 ft) stopway on each end. The runway length was limited by the fjord to the north and by National Road 5 to the south. From the northern end of the runway, a taxiway ran due south about 400 meters (1,300 ft) to the terminal.

The airport had very poor operating conditions. Whenever an aircraft was to land, the cranes at the shipyard had to be moved to allow sufficient clearance. Conversely, the airport could not be used when ships were launched. The industrial buildings were located just next to the taxiway. The control tower was located such that it did not have visual sight of the entire runway. The surrounding terrain, consisting of deep fjords, mountains and a town, made it impossible to install an instrument landing system. This again meant that the airport could only be served during daylight. The airport never received a permanent operating license.

== Airlines and destinations ==
Øyrane was served by Widerøe, which held the permission to operate all subsidized routes on the regional network. Widerøe served the airport with its fleet of 19-passenger de Havilland Canada DHC-6 Twin Otter aircraft and provided flights to Bergen Airport, Flesland in multi-legged flights which included other towns in Sogn og Fjordane. Airlift and Førdefly were also based at the airport for periods, although neither operated any scheduled services.
