= Gaular Municipality =

Former municipality in Sogn og Fjordane county, Norway

Gaular Municipality Gaular kommune
- Former municipality
- Indre Holmedal herred (historic name)
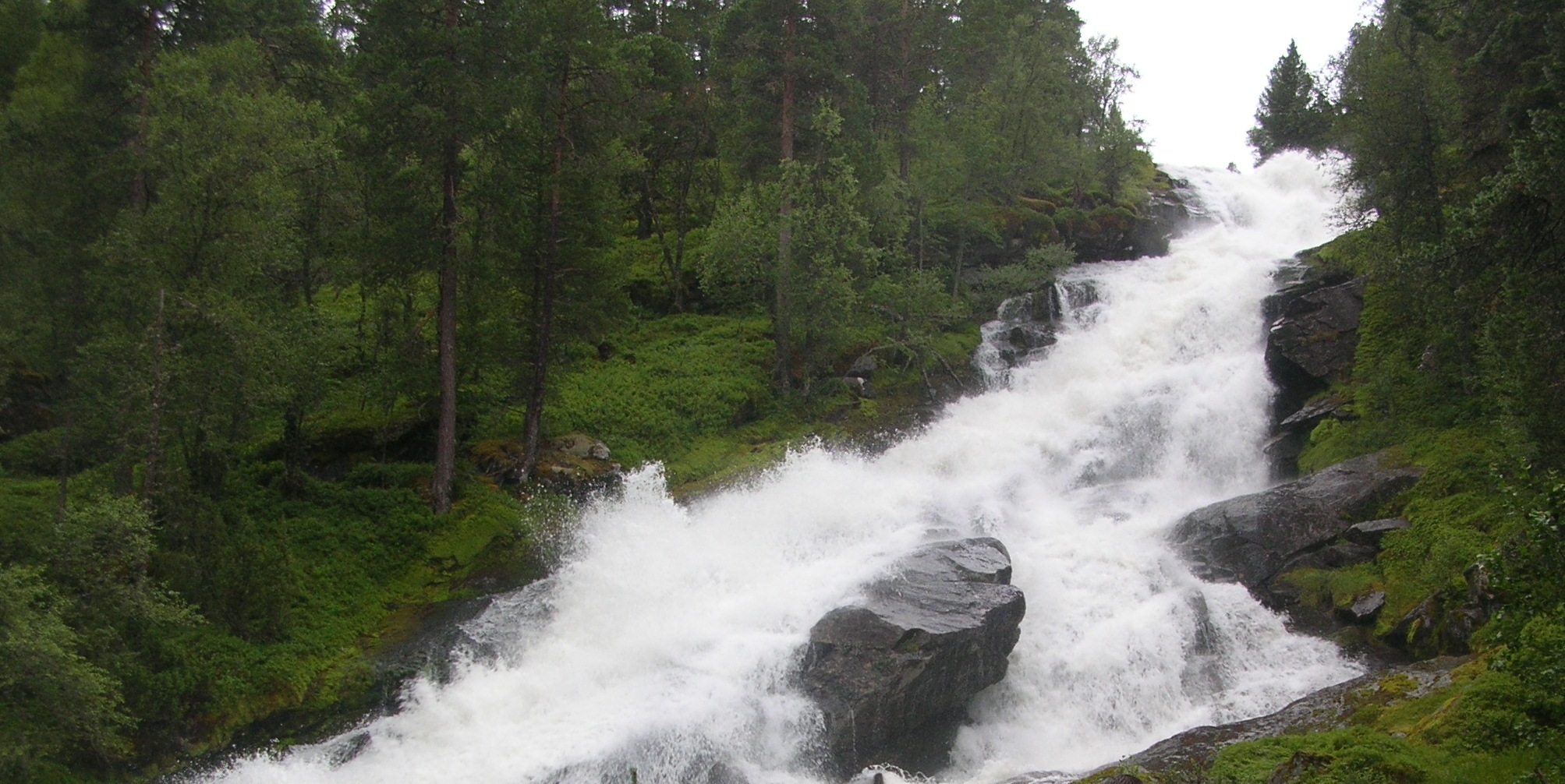
- View of the Brekkefossen waterfall

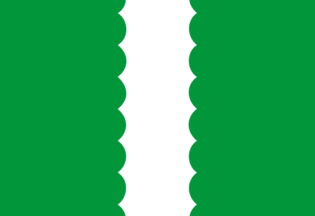
- Flag Coat of arms

- Sogn og Fjordane within Norway

- Gaular within Sogn og Fjordane
- Coordinates: 61°20′02″N 05°47′20″E
- Country: Norway
- County: Sogn og Fjordane
- District: Sunnfjord
- Established: 1 Jan 1838
  - Created as: Formannskapsdistrikt
- Disestablished: 1 Jan 2020
  - Succeeded by: Sunnfjord Municipality
- Administrative centre: Sande

Government
  - Mayor (2011–2019): Mathias Råheim (H)

Area (upon dissolution)
  - Total: 581.81 km^{2} (224.64 sq mi)
  - Land: 539.56 km^{2} (208.33 sq mi)
  - Water: 42.25 km^{2} (16.31 sq mi) 7.3%
  - Rank: #191 in Norway
- Highest elevation: 1,359 m (4,459 ft)

Population (2019)
  - Total: 3,027
  - Rank: #263 in Norway
  - Density: 5.2/km^{2} (13/sq mi)
  - Change (10 years): ▲ +9.8%
- Demonym: Gaulværing

Official language
  - Norwegian form: Nynorsk
- Time zone: UTC+01:00 (CET)
  - Summer (DST): UTC+02:00 (CEST)
- ISO 3166 code: NO-1430

Gaular is a former municipality in the old Sogn og Fjordane county, Norway. The 582-square-kilometre (225 sq mi) municipality existed from 1838 until its dissolution in 2020. The area is now part of Sunnfjord Municipality in the traditional district of Sunnfjord in Vestland county. The administrative centre was the village of Sande. Other villages in the municipality included Bygstad, Hestad, and Vik. Gaular was sometimes referred to as Fosselandet (the land of the waterfalls) because it was home to 28 large and small waterfalls. The municipality was centered on the river Gaula.

Prior to its dissolution in 2020, the 581.81-square-kilometre (224.64 sq mi) municipality was the 191st largest by area out of the 422 municipalities in Norway. Gaular Municipality was the 263rd most populous municipality in Norway with a population of about 3,027. The municipality's population density was 5.2 inhabitants per square kilometre (13/sq mi) and its population had increased by 9.8% over the previous 10-year period.

In 2016, the chief of police for Vestlandet formally suggested a reconfiguration of police districts and stations. He proposed that the police station in Gaular be closed.

== General information ==
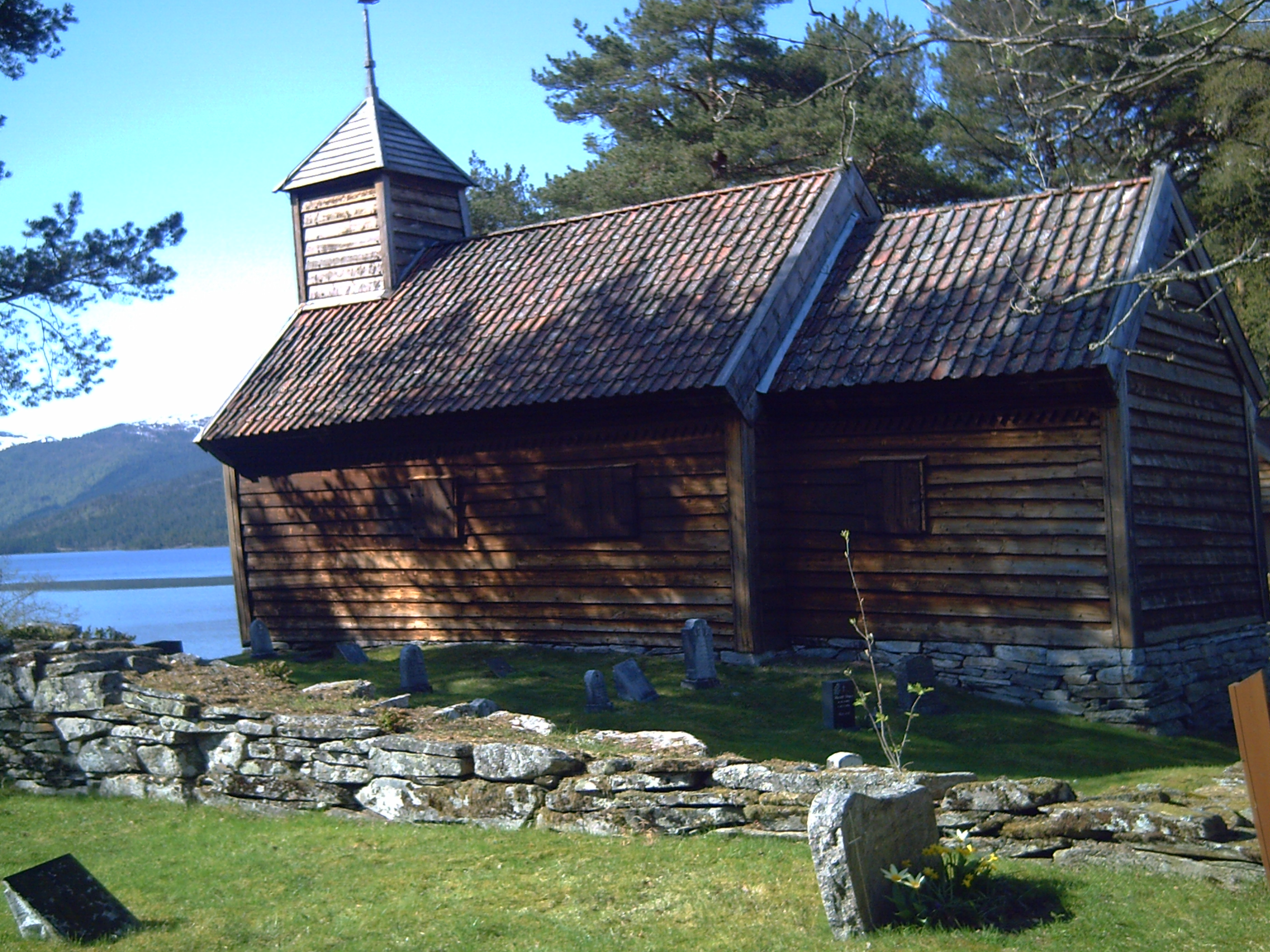
Hestad chapel

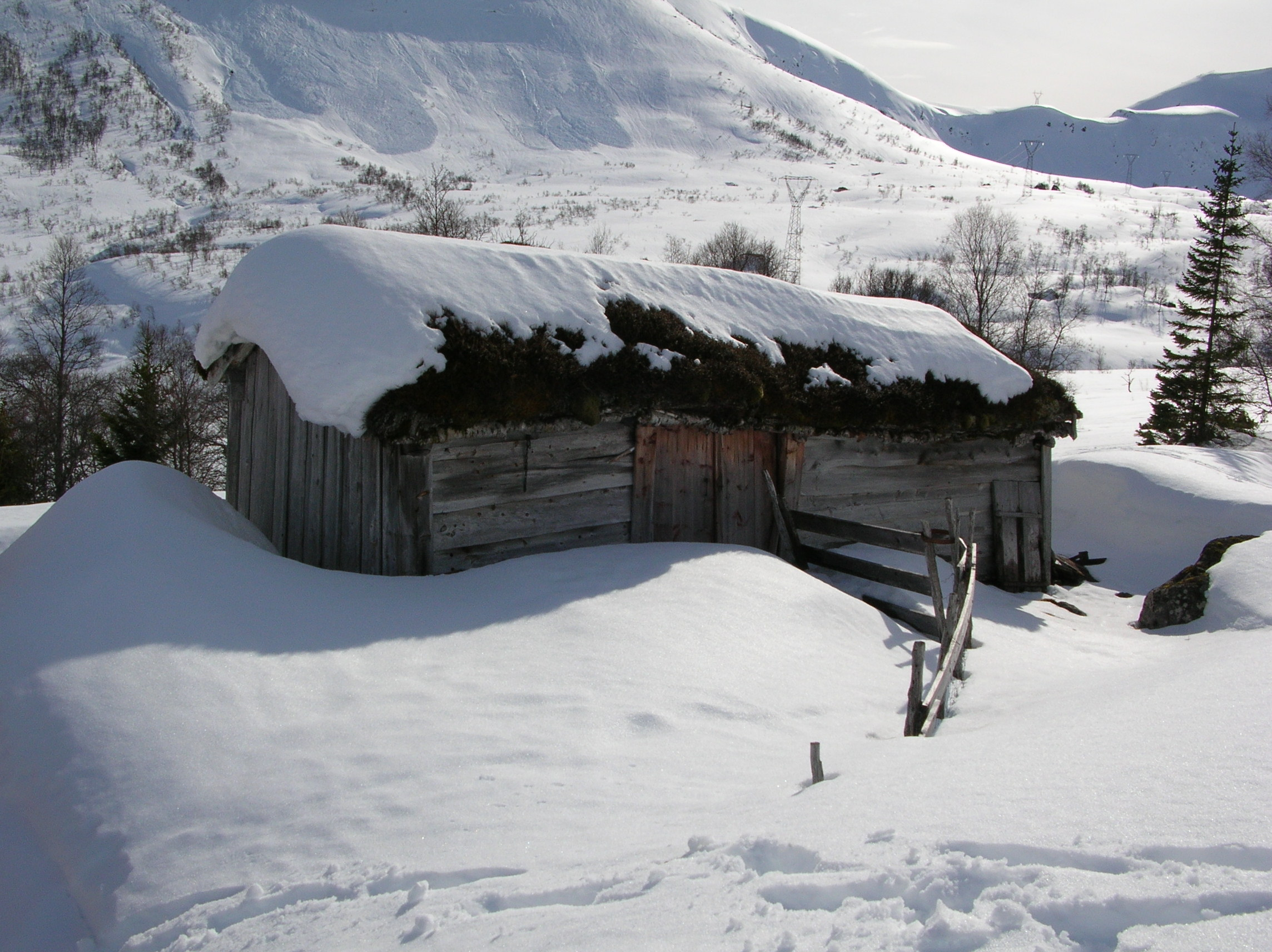
An old barn at Oppedal

The parish of Indre Holmedal was established as a municipality on 1 January 1838 (see formannskapsdistrikt law). The original municipality was identical to the Indre Holmedal parish (prestegjeld) which included the sub-parishes (sokn) of Bygstad, Sande, and Vik. In 1912, the name of Indre Holmedal Municipality was changed to Gaular Municipality.

On 1 January 1990, parts of the Hestad area (west of Sunde-Klepp, west of Bygstad) were transferred from Fjaler Municipality to Gaular Municipality.

On 1 January 2020, Gaular Municipality, Førde Municipality, Naustdal Municipality, and Jølster Municipality were merged to form the new Sunnfjord Municipality.

=== Name ===
The municipality (originally the parish) was named Indre Holmedal, after the old Holmedal farm (Old Norse: Hǫlmudalr) since the first Holmedal Church was built there. The meaning of the first element of Holmedal is uncertain, but it may have been an old name for a local river, Holma. It is unknown what the river name meant. The last element is derived from the word dalr which means "valley" or "dale". The prefix indre (which means "inner") was added to distinguish the area from its neighbor, Ytre Holmedal.

On 16 October 1911, a royal resolution changed the name of the municipality to Gaular, reviving an old name for the area. The new name is the plural form of the word Gaul which is the old name for the river Gaula. The old name of the river is related to the word gaula which means "to bellow" or "to howl", likely referring to the sound of the river.

=== Coat of arms ===
The coat of arms was granted on 24 April 1992 and it was in use until 1 January 2020 when the municipality was dissolved. The official blazon is "Vert, a pale argent engrailed" (Norwegian: På grøn grunn ein sølv stolpe laga med taggesnitt). This means the arms have a green field (background) and the charge is a vertical bar with scalloped edges. The charge has a tincture of argent which means it is commonly colored white, but if it is made out of metal, then silver is used. The green color in the field symbolizes the forests and farmland in the municipality. The charge was chosen to symbolize the river Gaula and its many waterfalls. The arms were designed by Even Skoglund after an original idea by Margrete Hareide from Bygstad. The municipal flag has the same design as the coat of arms.

=== Churches ===
The Church of Norway had one parish (sokn) within Gaular Municipality. It was part of the Sunnfjord prosti (deanery) in the Diocese of Bjørgvin.

Churches in Gaular Municipality
Parish (sokn)	Church name	Location of the church	Year built
Gaular	Bygstad Church	Bygstad	1845
Gaular	Sande Church	Sande	1864
Gaular	Hestad Chapel	Hestad	1805
Gaular	Viksdalen Church	Vik	1848

== Government ==
While it existed, Gaular Municipality was responsible for primary education (through 10th grade), outpatient health services, senior citizen services, welfare and other social services, zoning, economic development, and municipal roads and utilities. The municipality was governed by a municipal council of directly elected representatives. The mayor was indirectly elected by a vote of the municipal council. The municipality was under the jurisdiction of the Sogn og Fjordane District Court and the Gulating Court of Appeal.

=== Municipal council ===
The municipal council (Kommunestyre) of Gaular Municipality was made up of 21 representatives that were elected to four year terms. The tables below show the historical composition of the council by political party.

Gaular kommunestyre 2015–2019
Party name (in Nynorsk)	Number of representatives
Labour Party (Arbeidarpartiet)	3
Conservative Party (Høgre)	7
Christian Democratic Party (Kristeleg Folkeparti)	2
Centre Party (Senterpartiet)	8
Socialist Left Party (Sosialistisk Venstreparti)	1
Total number of members:	21
Note: On 1 January 2020, Gaular Municipality, Jølster Municipality, Førde Municipality, and Naustdal Municipality were merged to form the new Sunnfjord Municipality.

Gaular kommunestyre 2011–2015
Party name (in Nynorsk)	Number of representatives
Labour Party (Arbeidarpartiet)	3
Conservative Party (Høgre)	7
Christian Democratic Party (Kristeleg Folkeparti)	3
Centre Party (Senterpartiet)	6
Socialist Left Party (Sosialistisk Venstreparti)	1
Liberal Party (Venstre)	1
Total number of members:	21

Gaular kommunestyre 2007–2011
Party name (in Nynorsk)	Number of representatives
Labour Party (Arbeidarpartiet)	2
Conservative Party (Høgre)	3
Christian Democratic Party (Kristeleg Folkeparti)	2
Centre Party (Senterpartiet)	10
Socialist Left Party (Sosialistisk Venstreparti)	1
Common list for Gaular (Samlingslista for Gaular)	3
Total number of members:	21

Gaular kommunestyre 2003–2007
Party name (in Nynorsk)	Number of representatives
Labour Party (Arbeidarpartiet)	2
Conservative Party (Høgre)	2
Christian Democratic Party (Kristeleg Folkeparti)	2
Centre Party (Senterpartiet)	7
Socialist Left Party (Sosialistisk Venstreparti)	2
Common list for Gaular (Samlingslista for Gaular)	6
Total number of members:	21

Gaular kommunestyre 1999–2003
Party name (in Nynorsk)	Number of representatives
Labour Party (Arbeidarpartiet)	3
Conservative Party (Høgre)	2
Christian Democratic Party (Kristeleg Folkeparti)	2
Centre Party (Senterpartiet)	5
Liberal Party (Venstre)	1
Common list for Gaular (Samlingslista for Gaular)	8
Total number of members:	21

Gaular kommunestyre 1995–1999
Party name (in Nynorsk)	Number of representatives
Labour Party (Arbeidarpartiet)	2
Conservative Party (Høgre)	2
Christian Democratic Party (Kristeleg Folkeparti)	2
Centre Party (Senterpartiet)	8
Liberal Party (Venstre)	1
Common list for Gaular (Samlingslista for Gaular)	6
Total number of members:	21

Gaular kommunestyre 1991–1995
Party name (in Nynorsk)	Number of representatives
Labour Party (Arbeidarpartiet)	3
Conservative Party (Høgre)	2
Christian Democratic Party (Kristeleg Folkeparti)	3
Centre Party (Senterpartiet)	10
Liberal Party (Venstre)	3
Total number of members:	21

Gaular kommunestyre 1987–1991
Party name (in Nynorsk)	Number of representatives
Labour Party (Arbeidarpartiet)	4
Conservative Party (Høgre)	4
Christian Democratic Party (Kristeleg Folkeparti)	4
Centre Party (Senterpartiet)	6
Liberal Party (Venstre)	3
Total number of members:	21

Gaular kommunestyre 1983–1987
Party name (in Nynorsk)	Number of representatives
Labour Party (Arbeidarpartiet)	5
Conservative Party (Høgre)	4
Christian Democratic Party (Kristeleg Folkeparti)	4
Centre Party (Senterpartiet)	6
Liberal Party (Venstre)	2
Total number of members:	21

Gaular kommunestyre 1979–1983
Party name (in Nynorsk)	Number of representatives
Labour Party (Arbeidarpartiet)	3
Conservative Party (Høgre)	3
Christian Democratic Party (Kristeleg Folkeparti)	4
Centre Party (Senterpartiet)	7
Cross-party common list for protection of waterways and rural environment (Tverrpolitisk samlingsliste til vern om vassdrag og bygdemiljø)	3
Common list for Bygstad parish (Samlingsliste for Bygstad sokn)	1
Total number of members:	21

Gaular kommunestyre 1975–1979
Party name (in Nynorsk)	Number of representatives
Labour Party (Arbeidarpartiet)	4
Conservative Party (Høgre)	2
Christian Democratic Party (Kristeleg Folkeparti)	5
Centre Party (Senterpartiet)	6
Parish list for Viksdalen (Sokneliste for Viksdalen)	2
Local list for Sande (Bygdeliste for Sande)	1
Cross-party local list for Bygstad (Tverrpolitisk bygdeliste for Bygstad)	1
Total number of members:	21

Gaular kommunestyre 1971–1975
Party name (in Nynorsk)	Number of representatives
Labour Party (Arbeidarpartiet)	4
Conservative Party (Høgre)	1
Christian Democratic Party (Kristeleg Folkeparti)	5
Centre Party (Senterpartiet)	7
Local List(s) (Lokale lister)	4
Total number of members:	21

Gaular kommunestyre 1967–1971
Party name (in Nynorsk)	Number of representatives
Labour Party (Arbeidarpartiet)	3
Conservative Party (Høgre)	1
Christian Democratic Party (Kristeleg Folkeparti)	5
Local List(s) (Lokale lister)	12
Total number of members:	21

Gaular kommunestyre 1963–1967
Party name (in Nynorsk)	Number of representatives
Labour Party (Arbeidarpartiet)	4
Christian Democratic Party (Kristeleg Folkeparti)	5
Centre Party (Senterpartiet)	7
Joint List(s) of Non-Socialist Parties (Borgarlege Felleslister)	2
Local List(s) (Lokale lister)	7
Total number of members:	25

Gaular heradsstyre 1959–1963
Party name (in Nynorsk)	Number of representatives
Labour Party (Arbeidarpartiet)	4
Christian Democratic Party (Kristeleg Folkeparti)	5
Centre Party (Senterpartiet)	7
Joint List(s) of Non-Socialist Parties (Borgarlege Felleslister)	5
Local List(s) (Lokale lister)	8
Total number of members:	29

Gaular heradsstyre 1955–1959
Party name (in Nynorsk)	Number of representatives
Labour Party (Arbeidarpartiet)	3
Christian Democratic Party (Kristeleg Folkeparti)	3
Farmers' Party (Bondepartiet)	10
Joint List(s) of Non-Socialist Parties (Borgarlege Felleslister)	3
Local List(s) (Lokale lister)	10
Total number of members:	29

Gaular heradsstyre 1951–1955
Party name (in Nynorsk)	Number of representatives
Labour Party (Arbeidarpartiet)	5
Farmers' Party (Bondepartiet)	8
Liberal Party (Venstre)	5
List of workers, fishermen, and small farmholders (Arbeidarar, fiskarar, småbrukarar liste)	7
Joint List(s) of Non-Socialist Parties (Borgarlege Felleslister)	6
Local List(s) (Lokale lister)	5
Total number of members:	36

Gaular heradsstyre 1947–1951
Party name (in Nynorsk)	Number of representatives
Labour Party (Arbeidarpartiet)	3
Farmers' Party (Bondepartiet)	4
Joint List(s) of Non-Socialist Parties (Borgarlege Felleslister)	5
Local List(s) (Lokale lister)	24
Total number of members:	36

Gaular heradsstyre 1945–1947
Party name (in Nynorsk)	Number of representatives
Labour Party (Arbeidarpartiet)	5
Joint List(s) of Non-Socialist Parties (Borgarlege Felleslister)	3
Local List(s) (Lokale lister)	28
Total number of members:	36

Gaular heradsstyre 1937–1941*
Party name (in Nynorsk)	Number of representatives
Labour Party (Arbeidarpartiet)	3
Farmers' Party (Bondepartiet)	4
List of workers, fishermen, and small farmholders (Arbeidarar, fiskarar, småbrukarar liste)	2
Joint List(s) of Non-Socialist Parties (Borgarlege Felleslister)	15
Local List(s) (Lokale lister)	12
Total number of members:	36
Note: Due to the German occupation of Norway during World War II, no elections were held for new municipal councils until after the war ended in 1945.

=== Mayors ===
The mayor (Nynorsk: ordførar) of Gaular Municipality was the political leader of the municipality and the chairperson of the municipal council. The following people have held this position:

- 1838–1845: Rev. Jens Rennord
- 1846–1847: Ole O. Selberg
- 1848–1851: Rev. Jens Jakob Hansen
- 1851–1855: Ole Rognaldsen Døskeland
- 1855–1859: Capt. Reinhardt
- 1860–1861: Ole Rognaldsen Døskeland
- 1862–1863: L. Rennord
- 1864–1865: J. Hansen
- 1866–1869: Ole Rognaldsen Døskeland
- 1869–1873: L. Rennord
- 1873–1877: Anders Daae
- 1877–1881: Rev. Christopher Johannes Hammer
- 1881–1897: Johannes Risting
- 1897–1898: M.S. Foss
- 1899–1901: Ole O. Døskeland
- 1901–1909: Anders Ousen
- 1909–1922: Peder Hage
- 1922–1925: A.O. Lunde
- 1925–1945: Mathias M. Råheim
- 1945–1951: Rasmus Espeland (Bp)
- 1951–1967: Olav Døskeland (H)
- 1967–1973: Kristian Lien (KrF)
- 1973–1979: Andreas Berg (Sp)
- 1979–1987: Per Kjelstad (Sp)
- 1987–1995: Henrik Lunde (Sp)
- 1995–2003: Per Kjelstad (LL)
- 2003–2011: Jenny Følling (Sp)
- 2011–2019: Mathias Råheim (H)

== Population ==
Historical population
Year	1845	1855	1865	1875	1891	1900	1910	1920	1930	1946	1951	1960	1970	1980	1990	2000	2010	2019
Pop.	3,160	3,202	3,443	3,609	3,795	3,594	3,485	3,357	3,319	3,342	3,039	2,854	2,657	2,809	2,939	2,886	2,778	3,027
±% p.a.	—	+0.13%	+0.73%	+0.47%	+0.31%	−0.60%	−0.31%	−0.37%	−0.11%	+0.04%	−1.88%	−0.70%	−0.71%	+0.56%	+0.45%	−0.18%	−0.38%	+0.96%
Source: Statistics Norway and Norwegian Historical Data Centre

== Geography ==
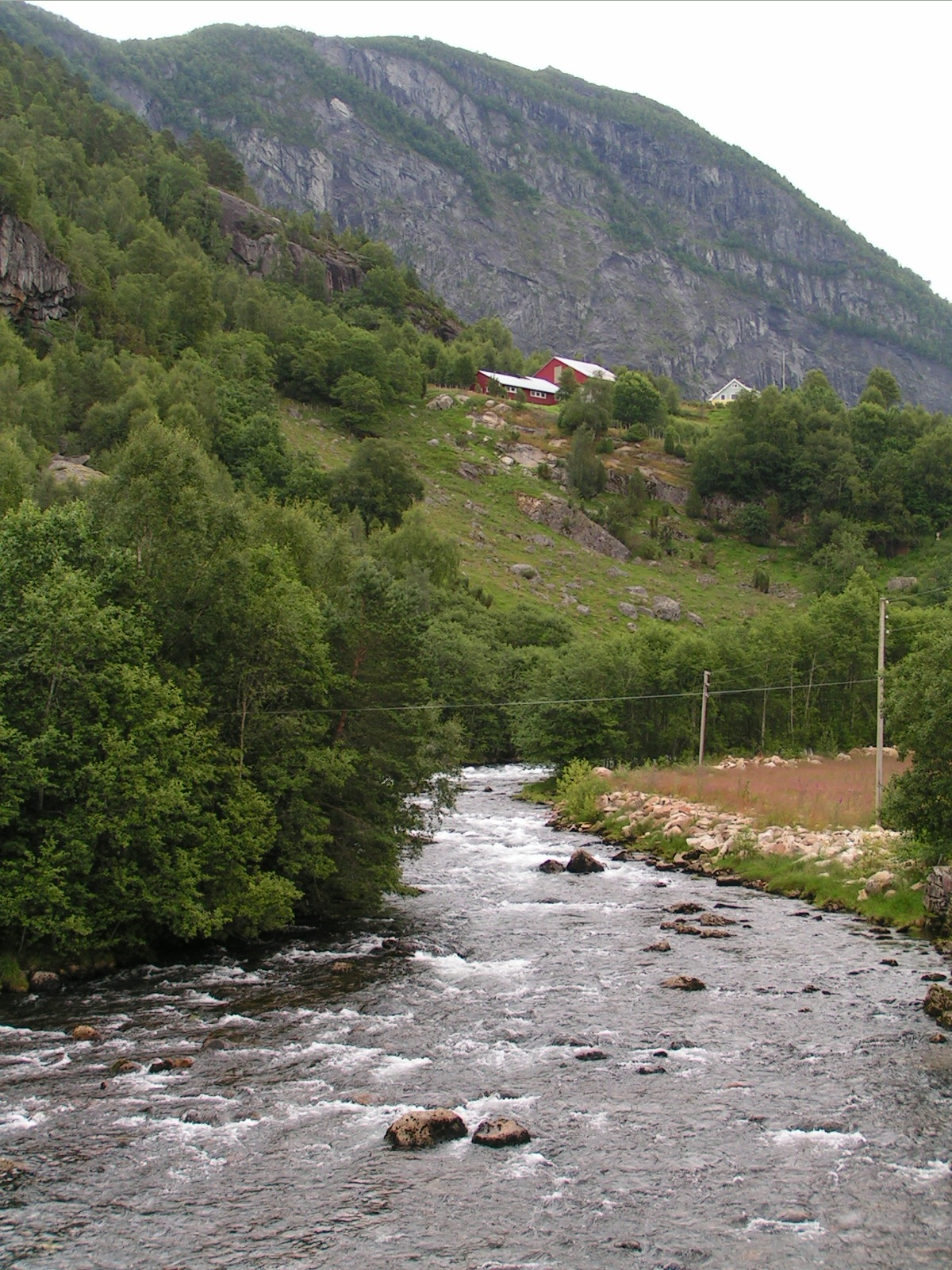
Gaula River

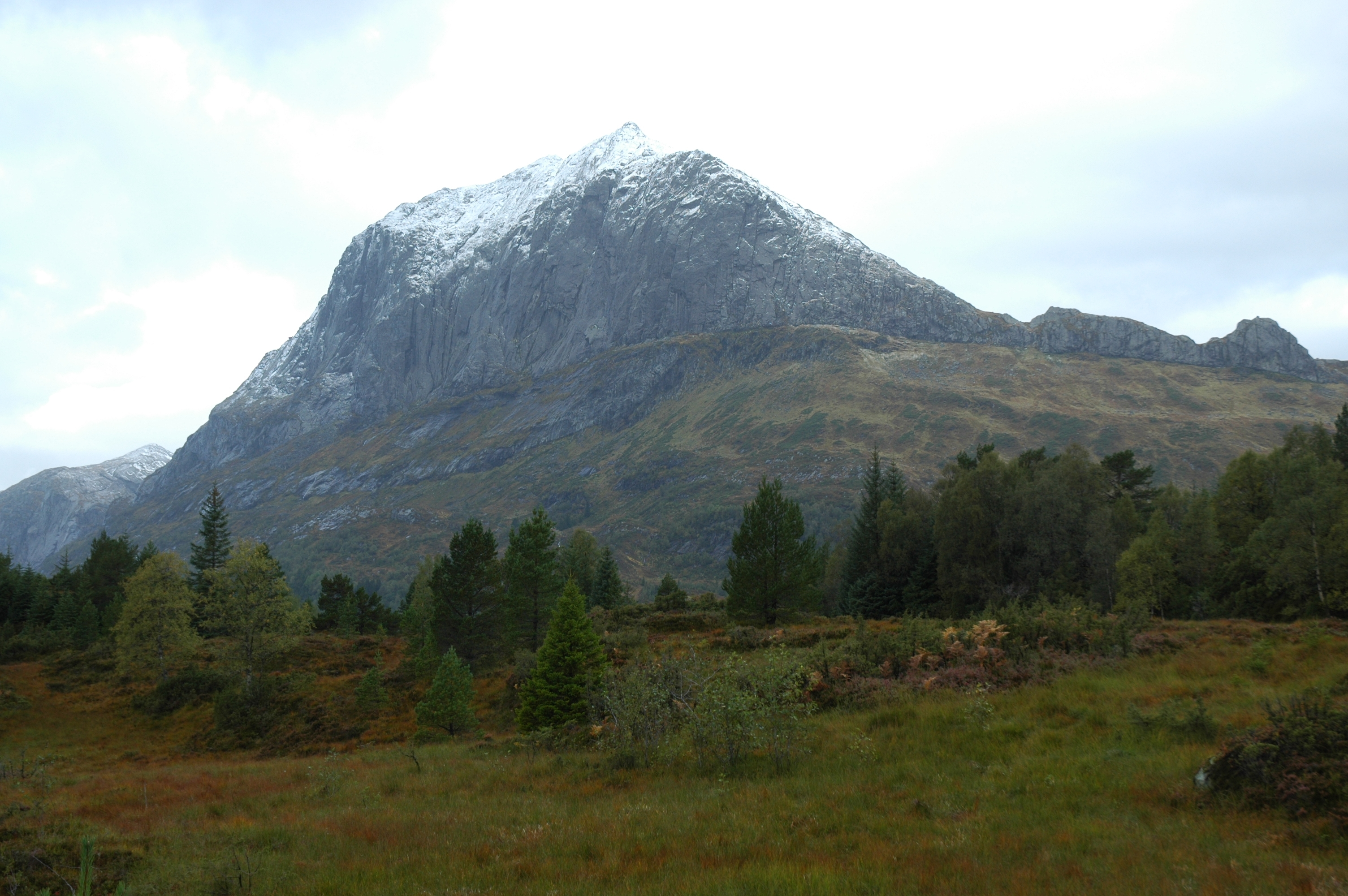
Storehesten (Kvamshesten) is a mountain in the north west of Gaular

Gaular Municipality was located in the central part of the old Sogn og Fjordane county, in the Sunnfjord region. It was bordered to the north by Askvoll Municipality and Førde Municipality, to the east by Balestrand Municipality, to the south by Høyanger Municipality, and to the west by Fjaler Municipality.

The Gaula River flowed west through the municipality and emptied into the Dalsfjorden near the village of Bygstad. There are several large lakes that are part of the river Gaula including the lakes Haukedalsvatnet and Viksdalsvatnet. The Viksdalen valley was located in Gaular. The river begins in the Gaularfjellet mountains to the east of the old municipality. The highest point in the municipality was the 1,359-metre (4,459 ft) tall mountain Geitebotsfjellet near the southern border with Høyanger Municipality.

== Transportation ==
The European route E39 highway went through the centre of Sande south to the city of Bergen, a distance of 150 kilometres (93 mi) (with a ferry between the villages of Lavik and Oppedal across the Sognefjorden). The Norwegian County Road 613 passed through the eastern part of the municipality. Førde Airport, Bringeland (ENBL) is located at Bringelandsåsen in Gaular Municipality.

== Attractions ==
=== The Salmon Stairs ===
William T. Potts from Coreen Castle in Ireland initiated the building of the salmon stairs (a type of fish ladder), which were completed in 1871, in return for an agreement made with the farmers that had 25 years of free fishing. The salmon stairs at Osen in Bygstad are the oldest in the world. The stairs consist of 17 pools/stages and has height of around 11 metres (36 ft). It is very effective as the salmon are forced to make their way up the stair construction, due to the current below the falls.

=== National Tourist Road ===
Fylkesvei 13 (Fv13) is one of 18 national tourist roads in Norway because of the nearby waterfalls. From near the town of Førde, drivers start on a sightseeing journey with cultural attractions that date from the 19th century to the present day's city environment. The districts of Holsen and Haukedalen are typical of Western Norwegian farming communities that have created a picturesque cultivated landscape.

Rørvik Mountain is on the road, and it has stone walls and a view over the Haukedalen valley. Along Råheimsdalen and Eldalen to the Gaularfjellet mountains, you will see a waterfall landscape that has been landscaped with paths for visitors. From the top of Gaularfjellet mountains, hairpin bends wind down to the Vetlefjorden, an arm of the Sognefjorden. The contrasts of steep mountainsides, winding roads, and waterfalls are characteristic of Western Norway's scenery.

== See also ==
- List of former municipalities of Norway
