= Helge Kringstad =

Norwegian banker, civil servant and politician

Helge Kringstad (born 10 July 1943) is a Norwegian banker, civil servant, and politician for the Labour Party.

He was born in Veøy Municipality. He took the cand.jur. degree in 1969, and worked as a deputy judge in Hammerfest until 1970. He worked as a lawyer for various companies between 1970 and 1977, and then became an assisting secretary in the Norwegian Ministry of Trade. In 1980 he became director of the Norwegian Guarantee Institute for Export Credits. In late 1987 he was hired as CEO of DnC Kredittforsikring. He was given an absence of leave, and Erik Holtedahl became acting director before Erling Naper took over in 1989. After the 1990 merger in DnC, the company for which Kringstad was CEO was named DnB Garanti og Kredittforsikring.

From September 1991 to September 1992 he was a State Secretary for development cooperation affairs in Brundtland's Ministry of Foreign Affairs. In 1994 he was appointed as executive director of the EBRD. He later became a lawyer again.

Kringstad has been a member of Norges Eksportråd, a board member of the Norwegian Agency for Development Cooperation, and vice president of the International Union of Credit and Investment Insurers. He has been a board chairman of the company Norway Registers Development; deputy chair at the time was Finn Kristensen. He resides in Blommenholm.

Civic offices
Preceded by Johs. Aarøy	Director of the Norwegian Guarantee Institute for Export Credits; 1980–1987	Succeeded by Erik Holtedahl (acting)
