= Myrmel =

Farm in Vestland, Norway

Coordinates: 61°21′20″N 5°46′24″E

Myrmel (historic: Myrmæl Bruk) is one of the largest and oldest farms the sub-parish of Sande in Sunnfjord Municipality, Vestland county, Norway.

Myrmel lies on a sunny hill with moraine soil, which is excellent to cultivate. On the other hand, it was full of big stones, thus it was sometimes difficult during the haying. The name Myrmel derives from mjali and meli, which is a reference to porous soil. The farm was first recorded in 1350, but it was probably already inhabited much earlier.
