= Hestad, Vestland =

Village in Sunnfjord Municipality, Norway

Hestad
- Village
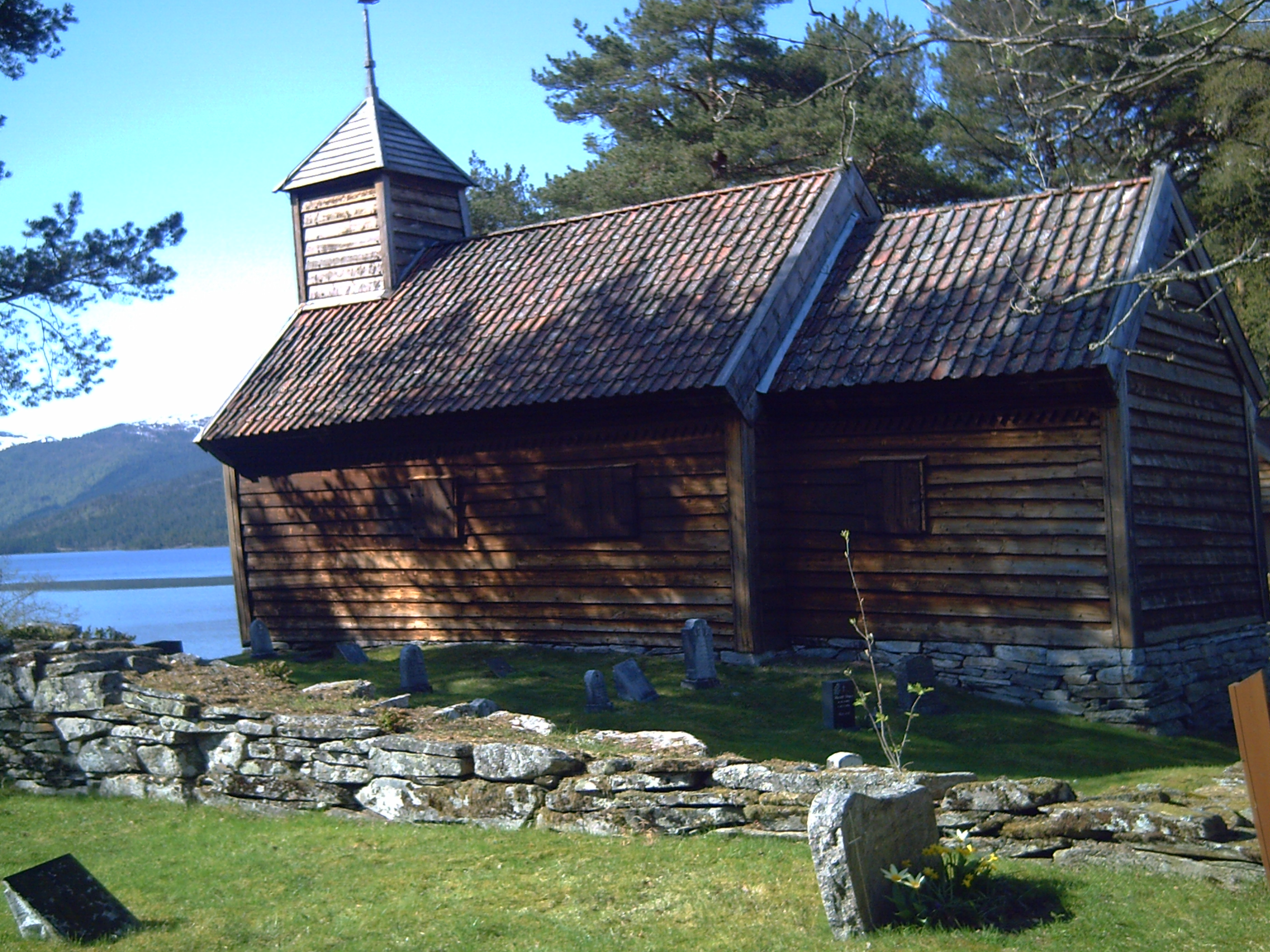
- View of the local chapel
- Interactive map of Hestad
- Location within Vestland Location within Norway
- Coordinates: 61.33447°N 5.92921°E
- Country: Norway
- Region: Western Norway
- County: Vestland
- District: Sunnfjord
- Municipality: Sunnfjord Municipality
- Elevation: 155 m (509 ft)
- Time zone: UTC+01:00 (CET)
  - Summer (DST): UTC+02:00 (CEST)
- Post Code: 6973 Sande i Sunnfjord

Hestad is a village in Sunnfjord Municipality in Vestland county, Norway. The village is located on the northern shore of the river Gaula (between the lakes Viksdalsvatnet and Hestadfjorden—the river runs through both lakes).

The village is located just north of a very small peninsula that is about 20 metres (66 ft) wide by 400 metres (1,300 ft) long. The peninsula juts south into the river, separating the two lakes. The forested peninsula is the site of Hestad Chapel and it has been a church site for centuries. There was originally an old stave church on the site that was built in the 14th century.

There is a bridge from the peninsula to the south side of the river, part of the Fv.610 highway. Hestad is located about 8 kilometres (5.0 mi) east of the municipal center, Sande and about 15 kilometres (9.3 mi) west of the village of Vik.
