= Aarøy =

Aarøy is a Norwegian surname. Notable people with the surname include:

- Johannes Aarøy (1910–1984), Norwegian civil servant
- Tor Hogne Aarøy (born 1977), Norwegian footballer
