= Mathias Råheim =

Norwegian politician (born 1951)

Mathias Råheim (born 14 September 1951 in Viksdalen) is a Norwegian politician for the Conservative Party.

He served as a deputy representative to the Norwegian Parliament from Sogn og Fjordane during the terms 1997–2001 and 2001–2005.

Råheim has been a member of the municipal council for Gaular Municipality from 1979 to 1988 and as deputy mayor since 1999. He was a member of the Sogn og Fjordane county council since 1983, serving as deputy county mayor since 1999. He chaired the county party chapter from 1990 to 2000.
