= Jenny Ellaug Følling =

Norwegian politician (born 1962)

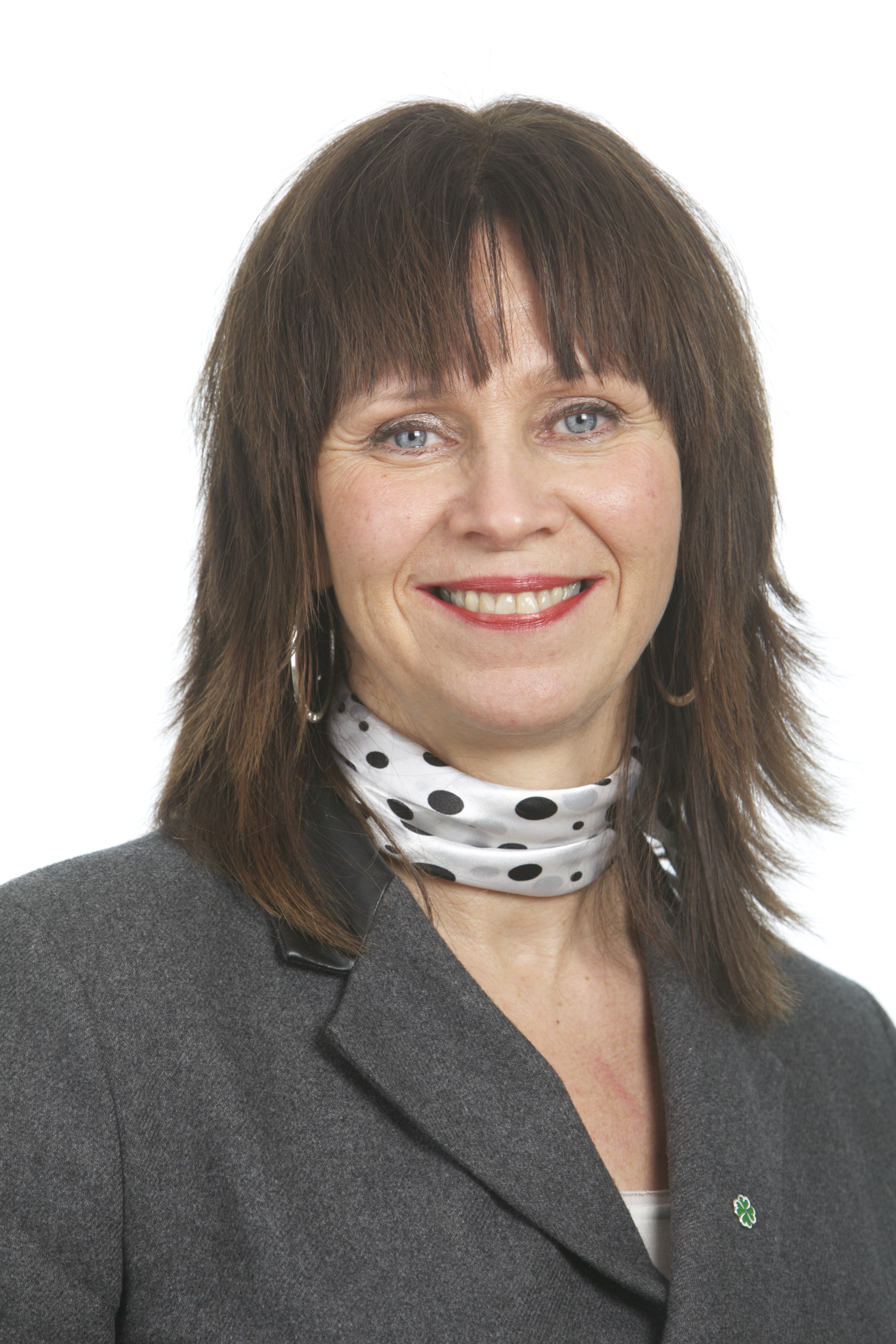
Jenny Følling

Jenny Ellaug Følling (born 19 March 1962) is a Norwegian politician for the Centre Party.

She was elected as a deputy representative to the Parliament of Norway from Sogn og Fjordane in 2013. As Liv Signe Navarsete from Sogn og Fjordane was a member of the outgoing Stoltenberg's Second Cabinet, Følling met as a regular representative during the two weeks before the cabinet change.

She resides in Bygstad in Sunnfjord Municipality.
