= Erling Naper =

Norwegian banker and civil servant (born 1936)

Erling Naper (born 24 June 1936) is a Norwegian banker and civil servant.

He was born in Sandefjord and took the cand.jur. degree at the University of Oslo in 1962, and then worked as a deputy judge in Sarpsborg. From 1964 to 1971 he worked for Hambros Bank in London, and from 1971 to 1989 for Den norske Creditbank in different leading positions including the position as vice president. From 1989 to 2005 he was director of the Norwegian Guarantee Institute for Export Credits (GIEK). He has also been member of Norges Eksportråd.

He resides in Oslo.

Civic offices
Preceded by Erik Holtedahl (acting)	Director of the Norwegian Guarantee Institute for Export Credits; 1989–2005	Succeeded by Wenche Nistad
