= Moskog =

Forest in Vestland, Norway

Moskog is a small forested area in Sunnfjord Municipality in Vestland county, Norway. It's located along the river Jølstra, just northwest of the lake Holsavatnet. At Moskog, the concurrency of National Road 5 and the European route E39 highway meets County Road 613.
