= Norwegian County Road 613 =

County road in Vestland, Norway

County Road 613
- Old number: 13
- Location of the road

Route information
- Length: 80 km (50 mi)

Major junctions
- North end: E39 Rv5 at Moskog
- Fv610 at Eldalsosen
- South end: Rv13 Rv55 at Dragsvik

Location
- Country: Norway
- Counties: Vestland
- Major cities: Balestrand, Holsen, Moskog

Highway system
- Roads in Norway; National Roads; County Roads

County Road 613 (Norwegian: Fylkesvei 613) runs between the village of Dragsvik in Sogndal Municipality and the village of Moskog in Sunnfjord Municipality in Vestland county, Norway.

Until 2010, the 80-kilometre (50 mi) long road was part of National Road 13 but administrative reforms passed this part of the road to the county. This part was renamed County Road 13, and the rest is still National Road 13.

In 2019, the road was renumbered to County Road 613, as a part of a reform aiming to have separate numbers of National Roads and County Roads. After this only National Road 13 has number 13 in Norway.

County Road 613 and a short section of County Road 55 are designated as one of eighteen National Tourist Routes in Norway. The road crosses the Gaularfjellet mountains.

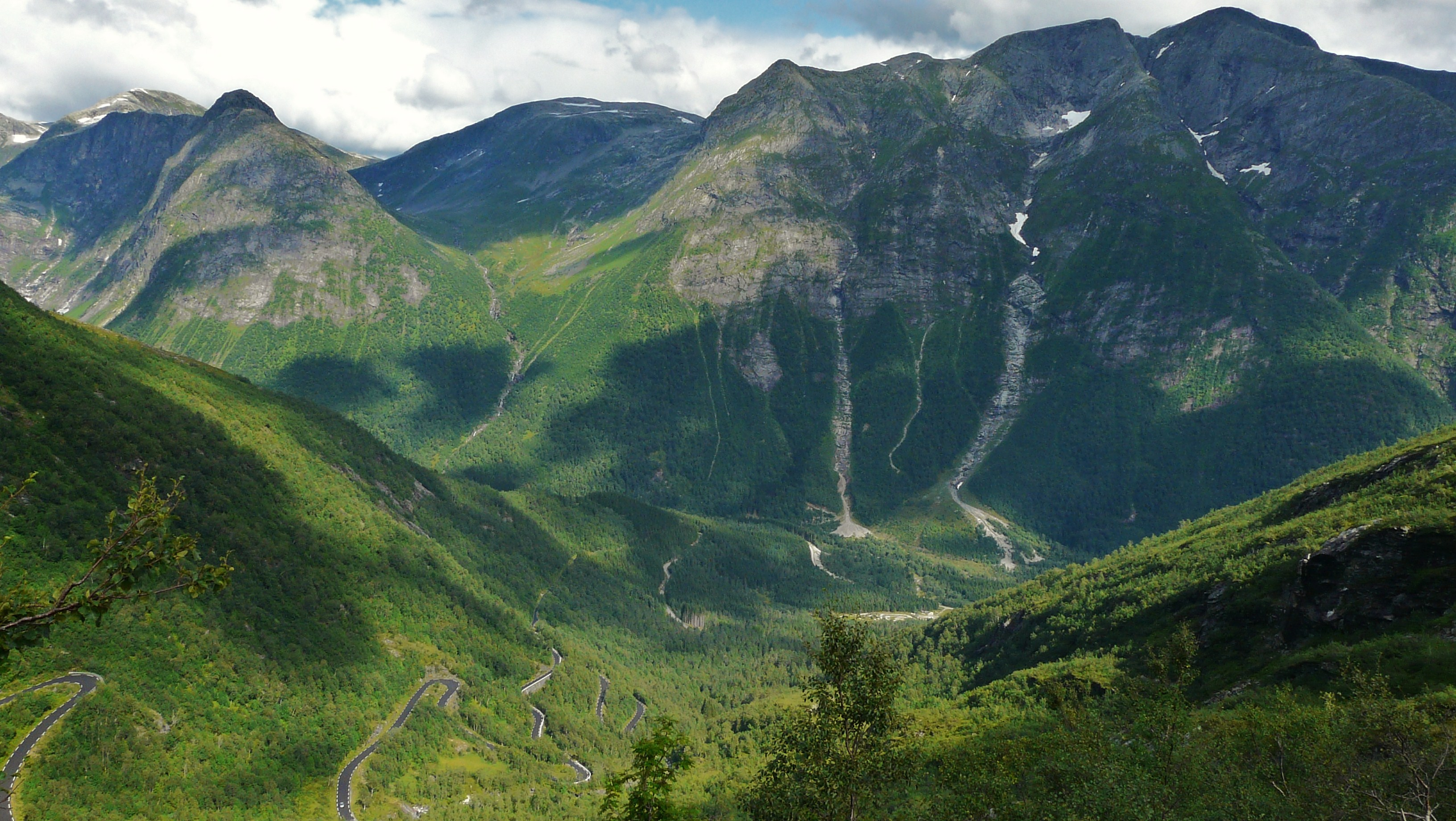
Gaularfjell

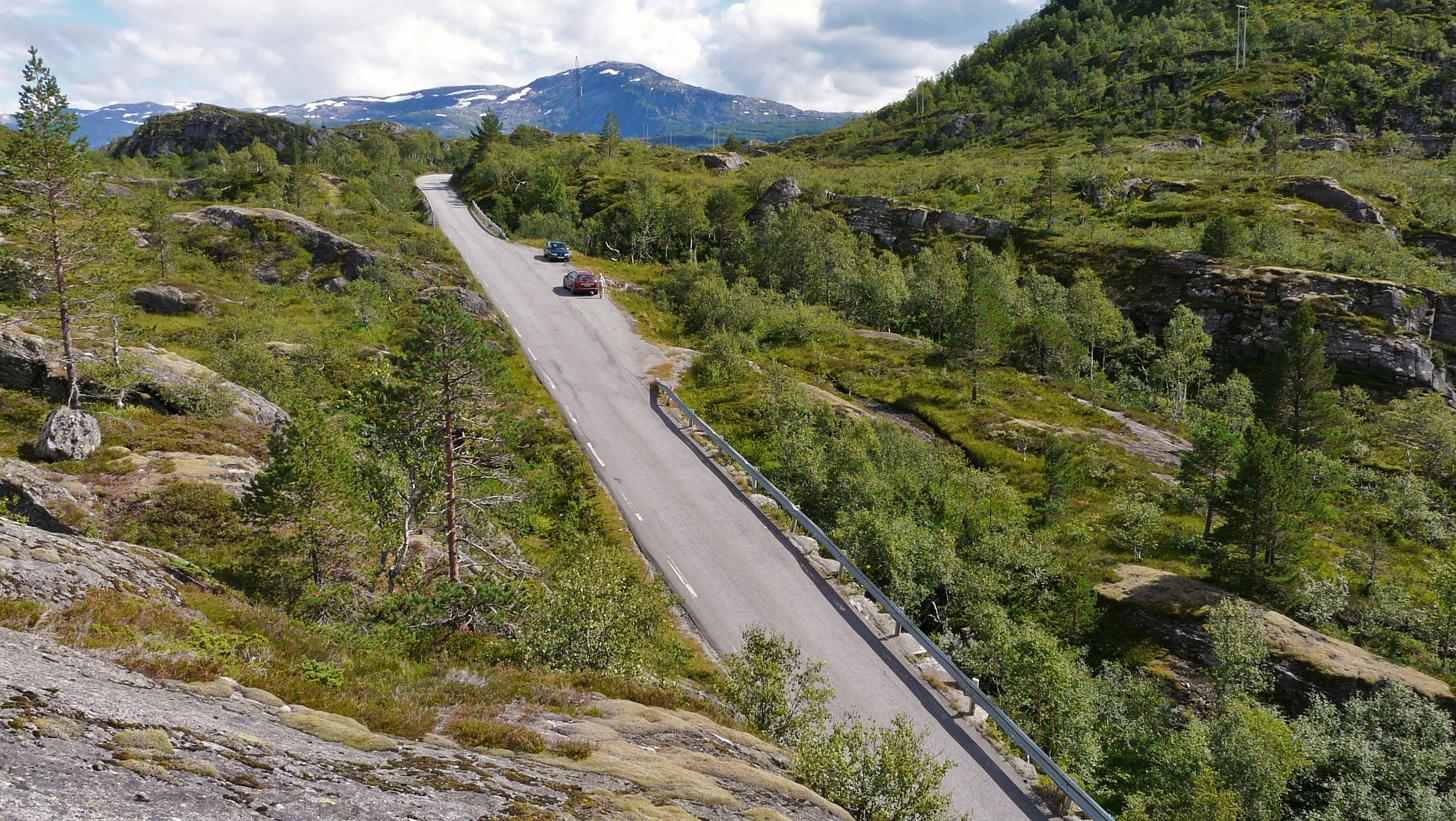
Rørvikfjellet

== Route ==
Sunnfjord Municipality

- E39 Rv5 Moskog
- Jølstra (ca. 50 m)
- Fv483 to Haukedalen
- Vallestad waterfall
- Fv421 at the village of Vik
- Soget (ca. 60 m)
- Osen (ca. 60 m)
- Fv610 to Hestad
- Closed going east of Mjell at night in winters

Sogndal Municipality

- Nystølen Elevation: 745 metres (2,444 ft) (highest point on this road)
- Closed going north of Mel at night in winters
- Fv152 to Menes
- Breiskreda Tunnel (180 m)
- Nautskreda Tunnel (180 m)
- Fv55 to Tjugum and Balestrand
- at Dragsvik, connections to Rv13 Rv55 Fv55
