= Johannes Aarøy =

Norwegian civil servant

Johannes Aarøy (August 16, 1910 – April 30, 1984) was a Norwegian civil servant.

He received his cand.jur. degree in 1935, and he was hired as a secretary of Statens Eksportkredittkommisjon (state's export credit commission) in 1938. He became director of this entity after World War II, and from 1960 to 1980 he served as the first director of the Norwegian Guarantee Institute for Export Credits. He represented Norway in the International Union of Credit and Investment Insurers, as both board member and president, as well as in the OECD. He died in 1984.

Civic offices
Preceded by position created	Director of the Norwegian Guarantee Institute for Export Credits; 1960–1980	Succeeded by Helge Kringstad
