= Hestad Chapel =

Church in Vestland, Norway

- Hestad kapell
- Øyrakyrkja
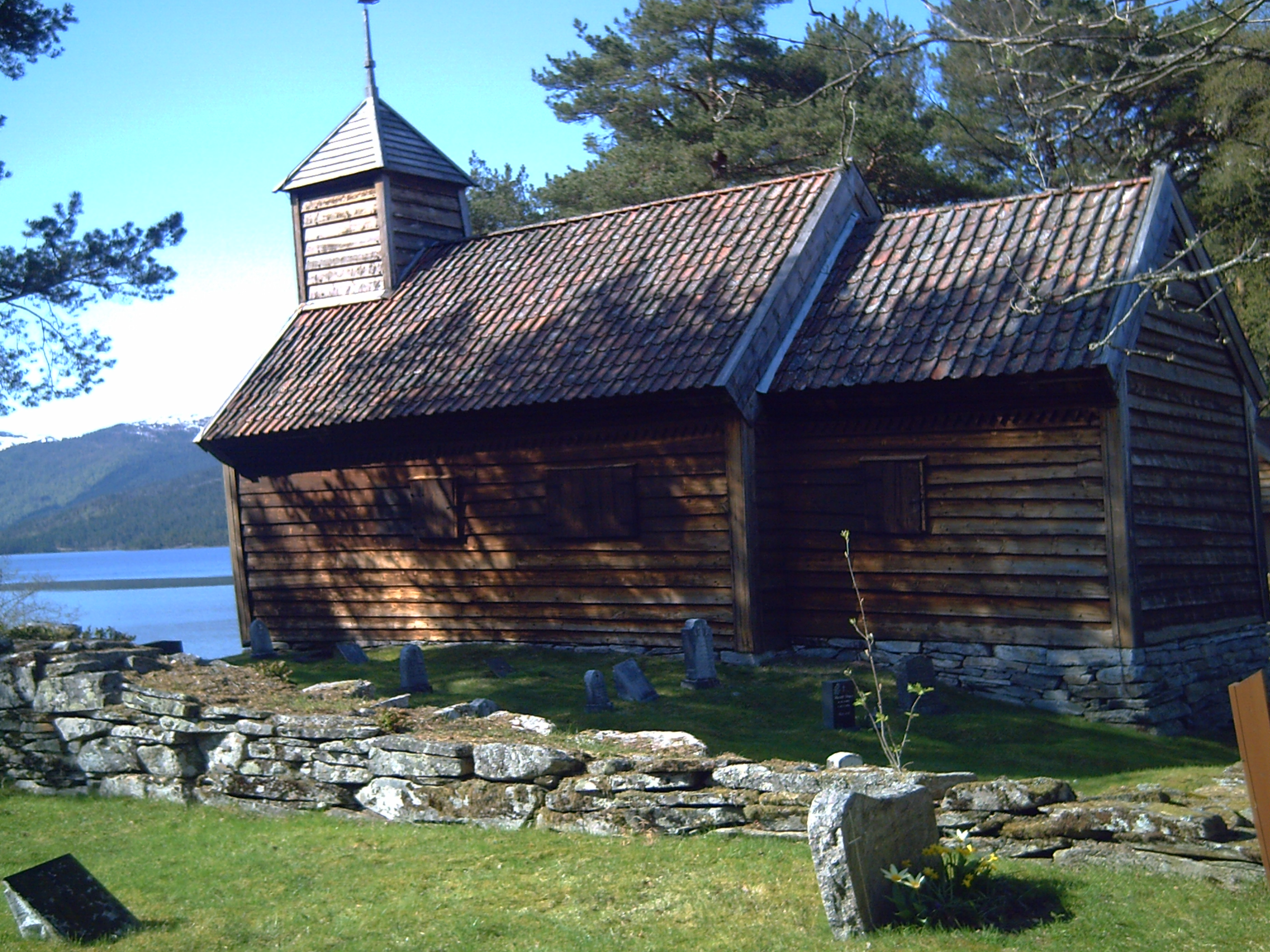
- View of the church
- Hestad Chapel
- 61°19′45″N 5°56′10″E
- Location: Sunnfjord Municipality, Vestland
- Country: Norway
- Denomination: Church of Norway
- Previous denomination: Catholic Church
- Churchmanship: Evangelical Lutheran

History
- Status: Parish church
- Founded: 12th century
- Consecrated: 1805

Architecture
- Functional status: Active
- Architectural type: Long church
- Completed: 1805 (221 years ago)

Specifications
- Capacity: 80
- Materials: Wood

Administration
- Diocese: Bjørgvin bispedømme
- Deanery: Sunnfjord prosti
- Parish: Gaular
- Norwegian Cultural Heritage Site
- Type: Church
- Status: Automatically protected
- ID: 84570

Hestad Chapel (Norwegian: Hestad kapell) is a parish church of the Church of Norway in Sunnfjord Municipality in Vestland county, Norway. It is located in the village of Hestad, on a small peninsula jutting into the Hestadfjorden, a lake that is part of the river Gaula. Because of its location on a small "island"-like peninsula, the church is also known as the Øyrakyrkja ("island church"). It is one of the four churches for the Gaular parish which is part of the Sunnfjord prosti (deanery) in the Diocese of Bjørgvin. The white, wooden church was built in a long church style in 1805 by an unknown architect. The church seats about 80 people.

== History ==
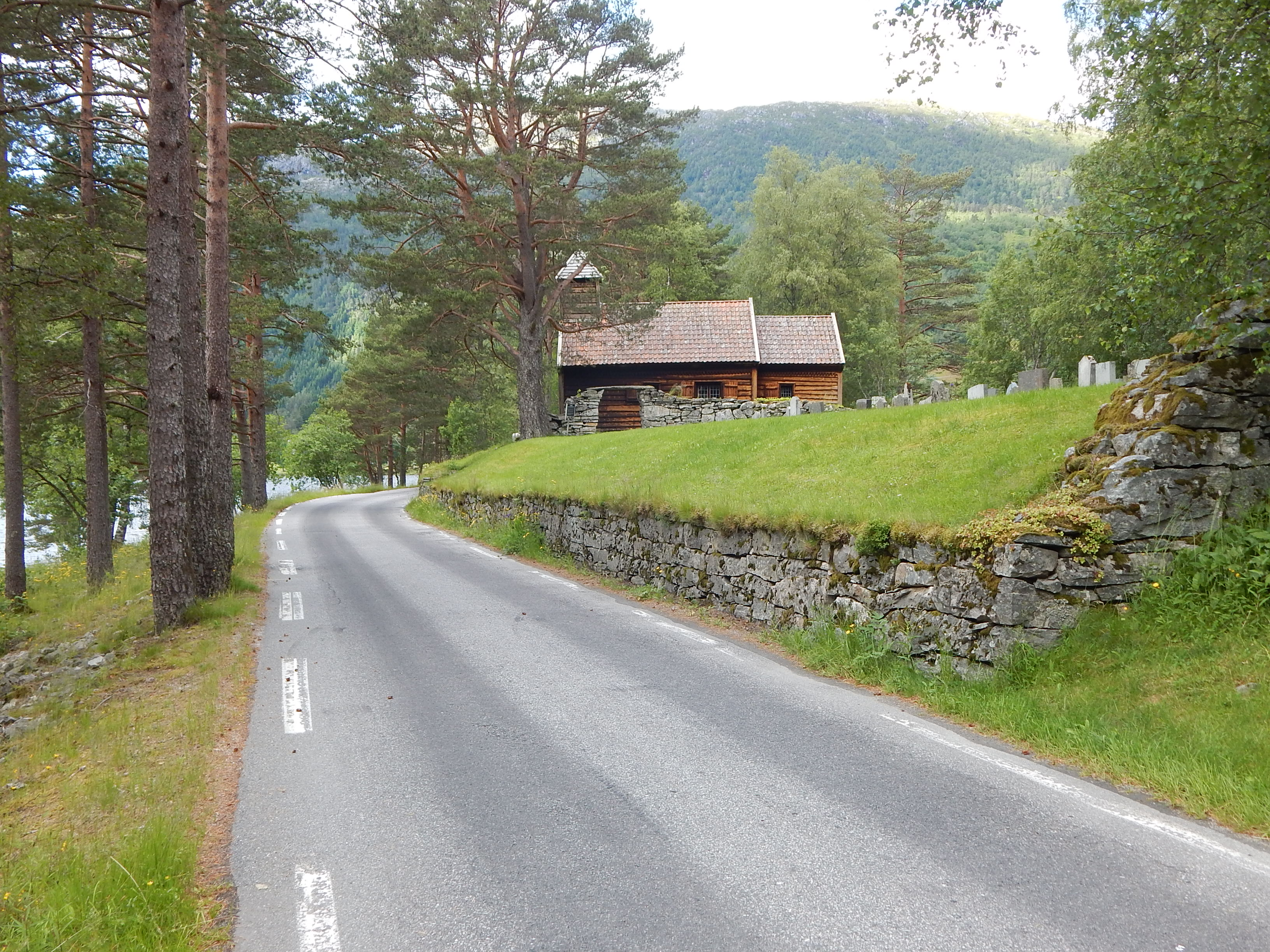
Hestad Chapel on FV610P and FV421

The chapel has a history that dates back to the Middle Ages. Legend has it that there was a church at Øyra the 12th century, but in written sources it is first mentioned in accounts from 1327. In an overview of the local church's seven properties from ca. 1350, Øyra church is mentioned as one of the five churches in Gaular. This church in Hestad was a small wooden stave church. After the Black Death the church was no longer regularly used. Historical records show that the church was again in regular use by the late 16th century.

Before the road on the south side of the lake was opened in 1884, the lake was the main route of transportation through the Gaula river valley. The chapel was located in the middle of the lake, making it the perfect location. In the summer, people went boat through the strait by the chapel and in winter they sled across the lake.

In 1805, the old chapel was demolished and a new one was built on the same site partly of material from the old chapel. The new church building was constructed by volunteer labor from the nearby residents. The small, wooden chapel seats about 80 people and the nave measures about 9 by 6.5 metres (30 ft × 21 ft) and the choir measures about 4 by 5.5 metres (13 ft × 18 ft). The roof and tower were destroyed by a strong storm in 1864. Repairs and the construction of a new tower took place soon after. The church bell is from the 17th century. The altarpiece is from 1805. The chapel is only used for special worship as well as for funerals and weddings. The church was owned by a number of local farmers until 1917 when it was purchased by the Society for the Preservation of Ancient Norwegian Monuments (Fortidsminneforeningen). The chapel and surrounding area are protected due to historical and natural qualities. In 1940, a bridge was built over the straits and in 1970 a road was built on the north shore of the Hestad Fjord (which is actually a lake). Norwegian county roads FV610P and FV421 pass right in front of the chapel.

== See also ==
- List of churches in Bjørgvin
