= Wenche Nistad =

Norwegian businessperson and civil servant

Wenche Karin Nistad (born 1952) is a Norwegian businessperson and civil servant.

She hails from Sande i Sunnfjord. She took her siv.øk. degree at the Norwegian School of Economics and Business Administration in 1976, and worked in Norsk Elektrisk & Brown Boveri from 1976 to 1984. She was the director of Bergen Bank from 1984, and in Den norske Bank after the 1990 merger. From 1994 to 2003 she was the CEO of Luxo. She then went on to Hadeland Glassverk, but resigned in 2004 after a tenure of only thirteen months. Dagens Næringsliv speculated that there was a conflict with owner Atle Brynestad. On 1 June 2005 Nistad assumed office as director of the Norwegian Guarantee Institute for Export Credits.

Civic offices
| Preceded by Erling Naper | Director of the Norwegian Guarantee Institute for Export Credits; 2005–present | Incumbent |
