= Kristian Lien =

Norwegian politician

Kristian Lien (10 May 1915 – 20 May 1996) was a Norwegian politician for the Christian Democratic Party.

He grew up in Bergen, but settled at Bygstad. He served as mayor of Gaular Municipality, and was a member of Sogn og Fjordane county council from 1968 to 1975. He served as a deputy representative to the Norwegian Parliament from Sogn og Fjordane during the term 1969–1973.
