= Gaularfjellet =

Mountain area in Vestland, Norway

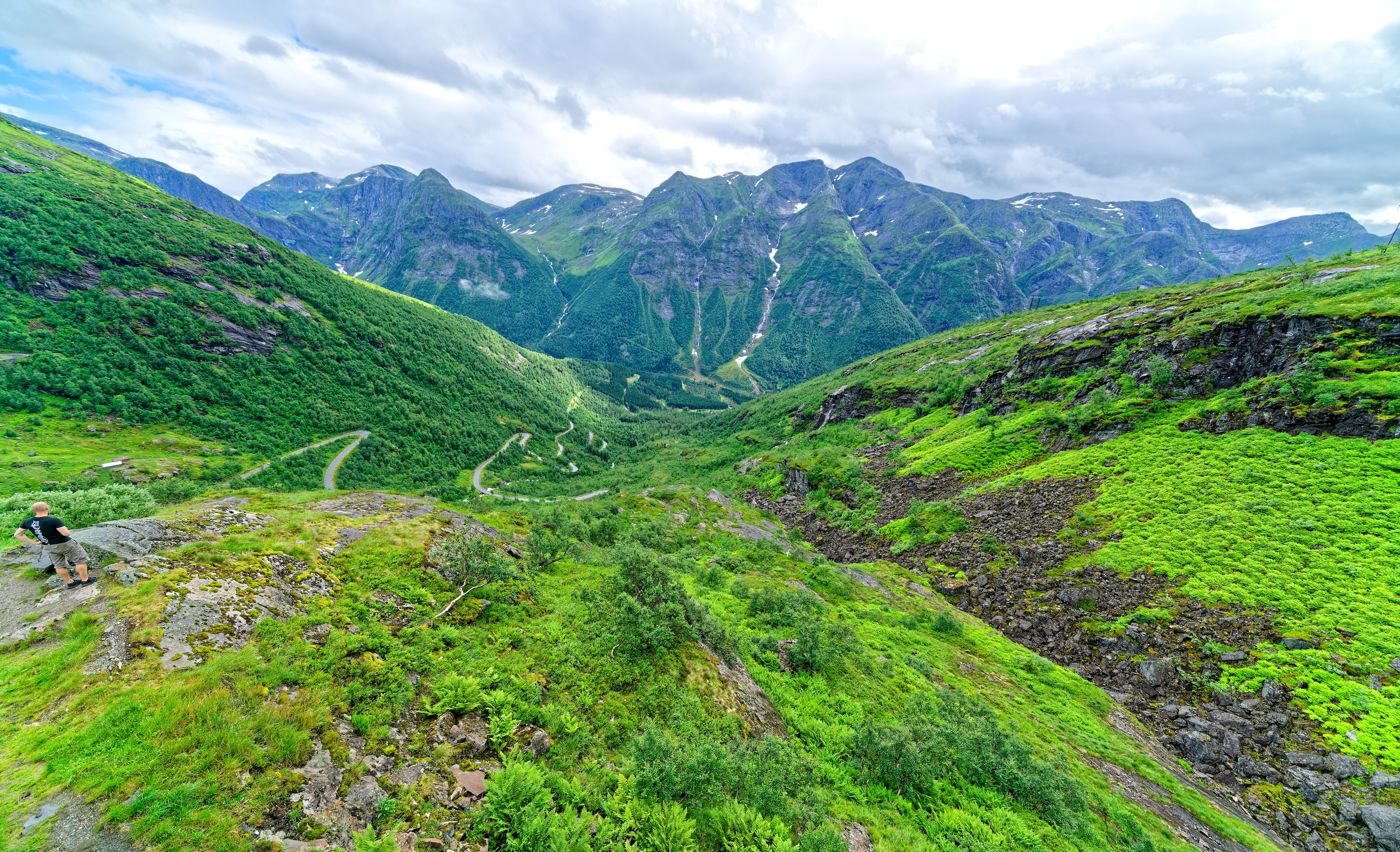

Highest point
- Peak: Sunnfjordbjørnen, Sunnfjord/Sogndal, Norway
- Elevation: 1,615 m (5,299 ft)
- Coordinates: 61.41352°N 6.52901°E

Geography
- Location: Vestland, Norway
- Range coordinates: 61.34324°N 6.44584°E

Gaularfjellet is a mountain area in central Vestland county, Norway. The mountains are crossed by the border between Sunnfjord Municipality, Høyanger Municipality, and Sogndal Municipality.

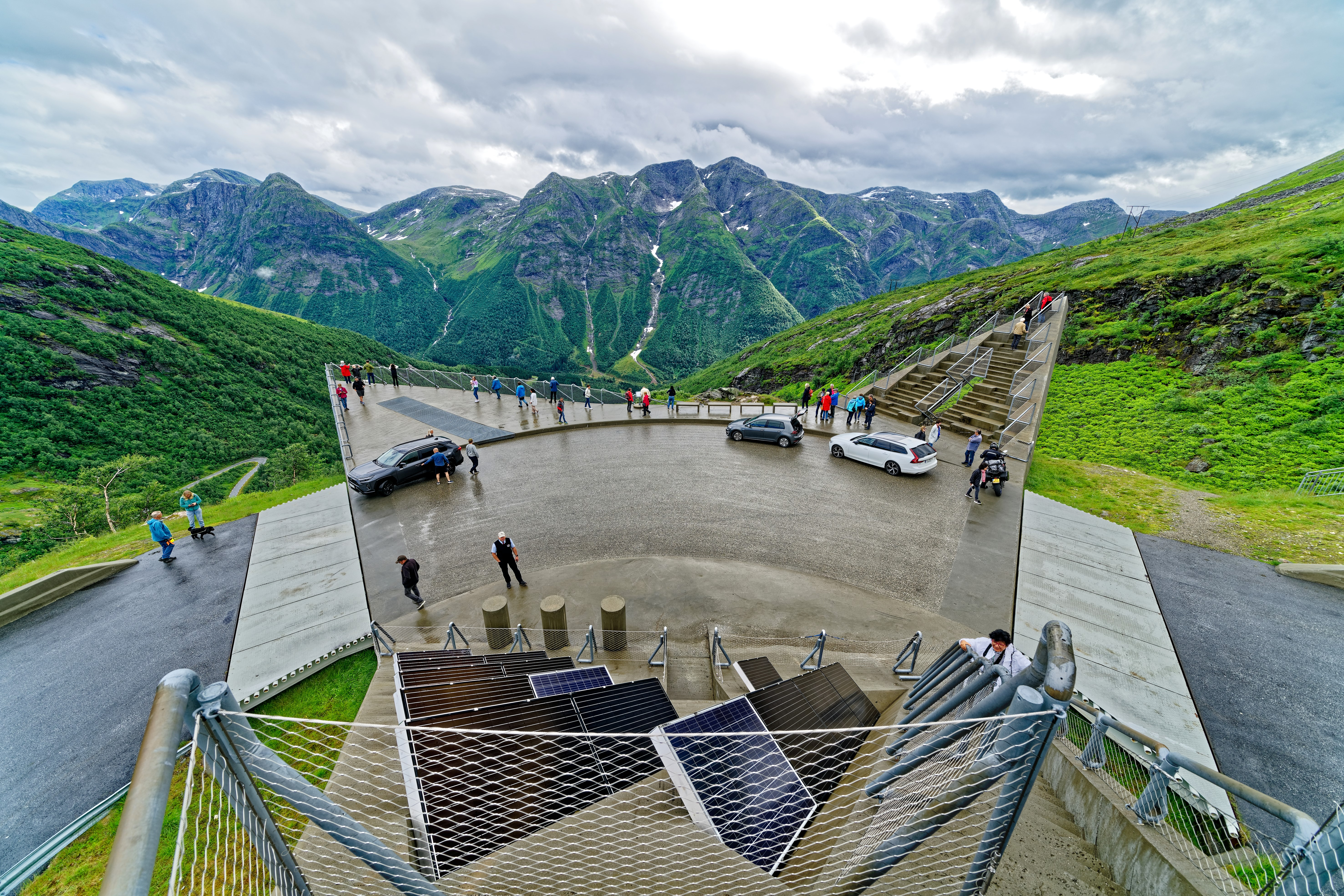
Aussichtsterasse Gaularfjellet.

Norwegian County Road 613 (formerly County Road 13, Norwegian National Road 13, and Norwegian National Road 5) crosses the mountains through a pass that follows the river Gaula, and has a hairpin road.

Before the Høyanger Tunnel was opened in 1982, the only access to Balestrand Municipality from the rest of Norway was by ferry over the fjord or the road over Gaularfjellet (although that mountain road was often closed during the winter).

== See also ==
- List of mountains of Norway
