= Bygstad Church =

Church in Vestland, Norway

- Bygstad kyrkje
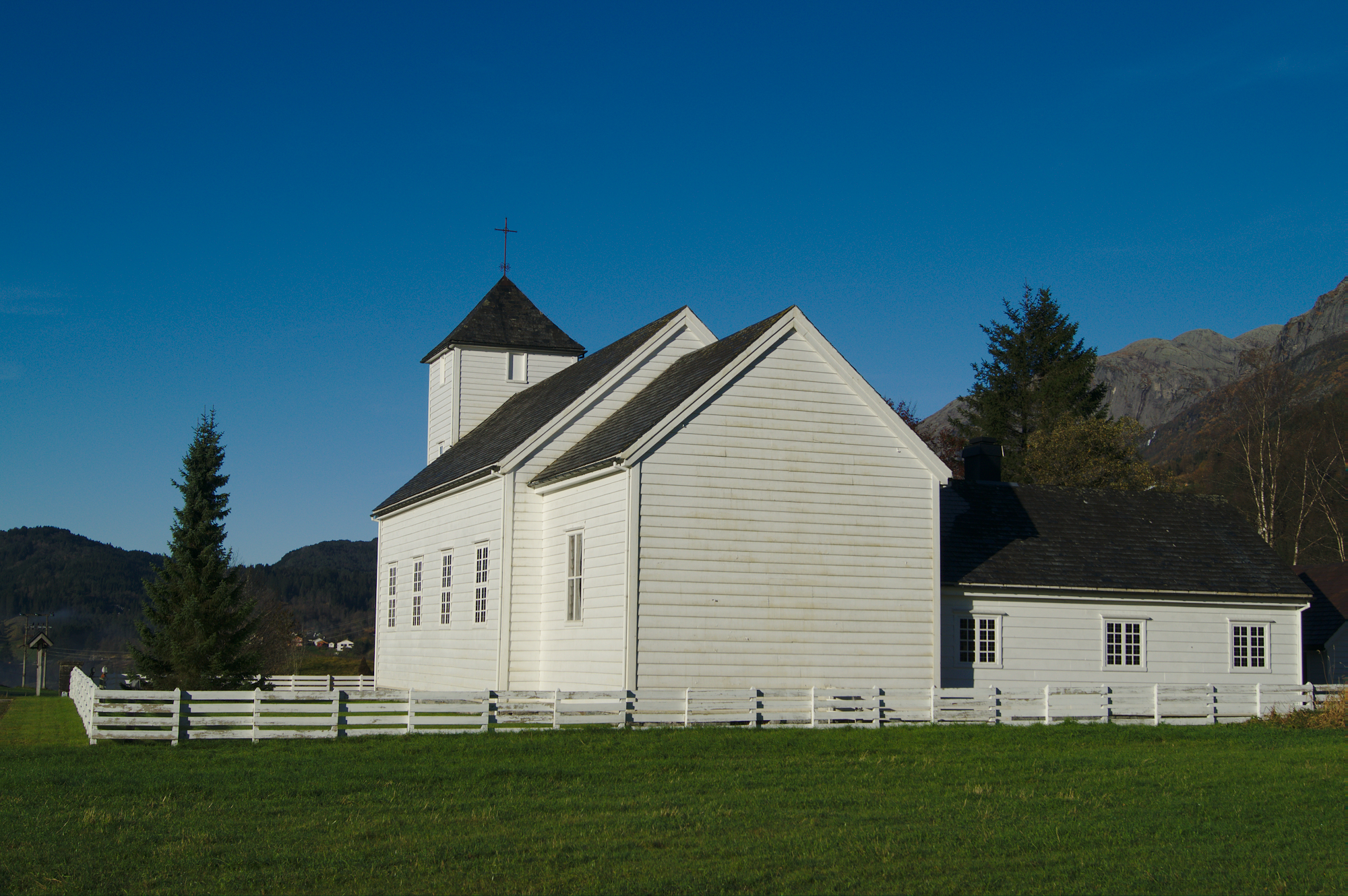
- View of the church
- Bygstad Church
- 61°22′50″N 5°39′55″E
- Location: Sunnfjord Municipality, Vestland
- Country: Norway
- Denomination: Church of Norway
- Previous denomination: Catholic Church
- Churchmanship: Evangelical Lutheran

History
- Status: Parish church
- Founded: 13th century
- Consecrated: 2 November 1845
- Events: Church moved (1939)

Architecture
- Functional status: Active
- Architect: Hans Linstow
- Architectural type: Long church
- Completed: 1845 (181 years ago)

Specifications
- Capacity: 300
- Materials: Wood

Administration
- Diocese: Bjørgvin bispedømme
- Deanery: Sunnfjord prosti
- Parish: Gaular
- Norwegian Cultural Heritage Site
- Type: Church
- Status: Automatically protected
- ID: 83978

Bygstad Church (Norwegian: Bygstad kyrkje) is a parish church of the Church of Norway in Sunnfjord Municipality in Vestland county, Norway. It is located in the village of Bygstad. It one of the four churches for the Gaular parish which is part of the Sunnfjord prosti (deanery) in the Diocese of Bjørgvin. The white, wooden church was built in a long church style in 1845 using designs by the architect Hans Linstow. The church seats about 300 people.

== History ==
The earliest existing historical records of the church date back to the year 1330, but it was not new at that time. The first church in Bygstad was a wooden stave church that was likely built during the 13th century. The first church was located at Kvamme, about 1 kilometre (0.62 mi) west of the present-day site of the church. Some time before 1686, a new timber-framed choir was built to replace the old choir. In 1686 when the church was inspected, the nave measured about 13.6 by 8.8 metres (45 ft × 29 ft) and the choir measured about 6 by 6 metres (20 ft × 20 ft). The building also had a church porch with a tower above it.

By the 1840s, the old stave church was decaying and in need of extensive repairs. It was decided to build a new church, a little west of the old church. After building the new church, the old church was torn down. There was some controversy over this plan, because some wanted to restore the old church. It was built using architectural drawings by Hans Linstow. The church had a west tower but no choir or sacristy, and the nave's dimensions were about 16.5 by 9 metres (54 ft × 30 ft) and it seated about 300 people. Some materials from the old stave church were reused in the new church. The new building was consecrated on 2 November 1845 by the local dean, Johan Grønnlund.

By the 1900s, the church was already showing signs of age and some of the walls were no longer straight. Demands for a new church were heard and eventually a new plan was approved. The old church would be moved to a new site and rebuilt and enlarged at that site. Immediately after the service on 5 February 1939, the demolition work began. The church was disassembled and moved from its original site at Eide to the Bygstad farm about 1 kilometre (0.62 mi) to the east of the historic church site. The church was then rebuilt by the architect Wilhelm Essendrop and the lead builder was Andreas Selberg. The total cost of the work was 60,000 kr. The church was rebuilt to look like it did at its previous location, plus a new choir and sacristy were built on the east end of the nave. The newly rebuilt church was consecrated on 11 October 1939 by Bishop Andreas Fleischer. There is an extension perpendicular to the choir on the north side that contains a priest's sacristy, baptismal sacristy, and church hall.

== See also ==
- List of churches in Bjørgvin
