= Viksdalen Church =

Church in Vestland, Norway

- Viksdalen kyrkje
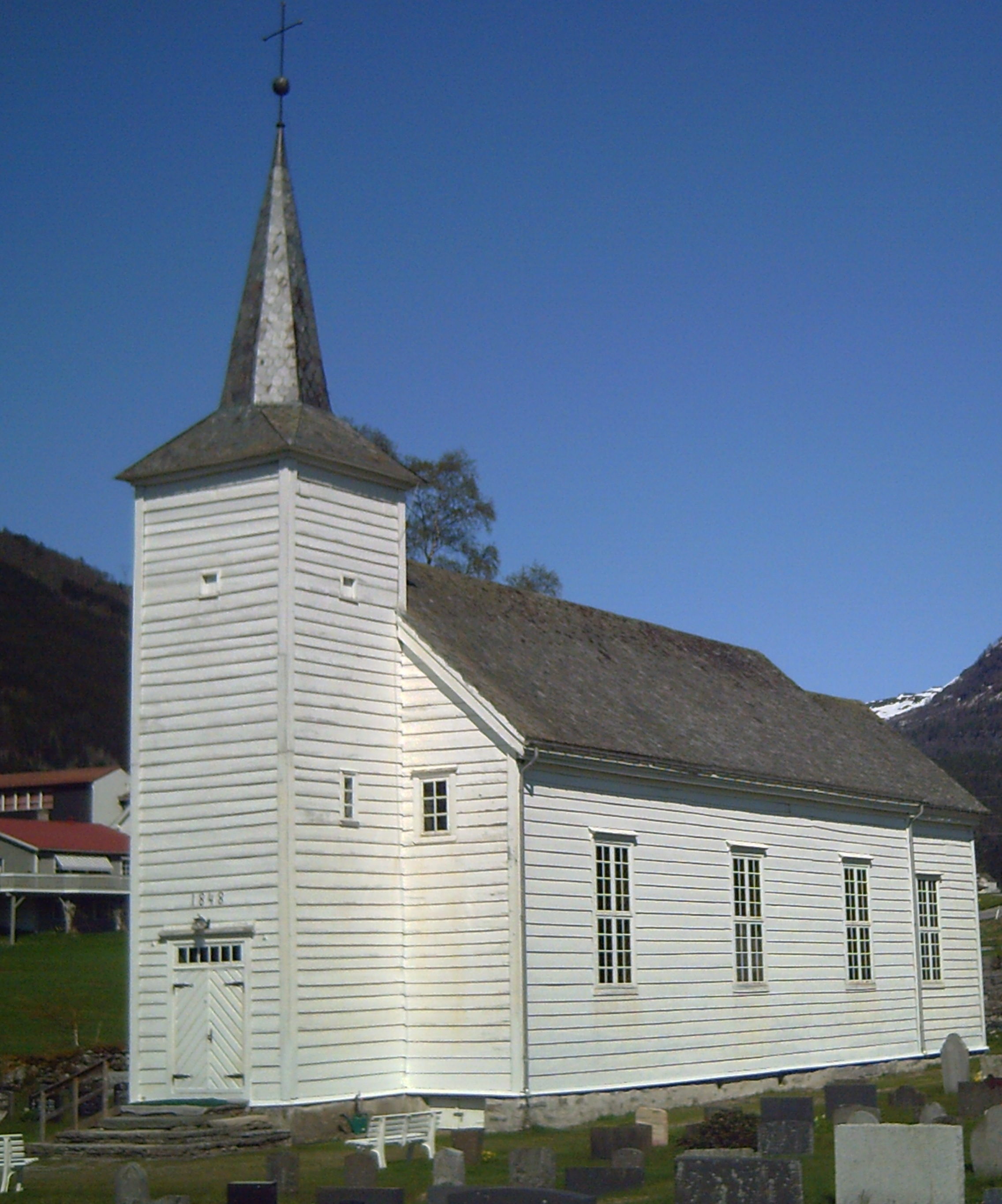
- View of the church
- Viksdalen Church
- 61°21′06″N 6°06′57″E
- Location: Sunnfjord Municipality, Vestland
- Country: Norway
- Denomination: Church of Norway
- Previous denomination: Catholic Church
- Churchmanship: Evangelical Lutheran

History
- Status: Parish church
- Founded: 13th century
- Consecrated: 5 Nov 1848

Architecture
- Functional status: Active
- Architect: Hans Linstow
- Architectural type: Long church
- Completed: 1848 (178 years ago)

Specifications
- Capacity: 284
- Materials: Wood

Administration
- Diocese: Bjørgvin bispedømme
- Deanery: Sunnfjord prosti
- Parish: Gaular
- Norwegian Cultural Heritage Site
- Type: Church
- Status: Automatically protected
- ID: 85845

Viksdalen Church (Norwegian: Viksdalen kyrkje) is a parish church of the Church of Norway in Sunnfjord Municipality in Vestland county, Norway. It is located in the village of Vik. It one of the four churches for the Gaular parish which is part of the Sunnfjord prosti (deanery) in the Diocese of Bjørgvin. The white, wooden church was built in a long church style in 1848 using designs by the architect Hans Linstow. The church seats about 284 people.

== History ==
The earliest existing historical records of the church date back to the year 1322, but the church was not new at that time. The first church in Viksdalen was likely a wooden stave church that was built in the 13th century. The church was historically called Vik Church. Around the year 1620, the old church was torn down and replaced with a timber-framed long church.

In the spring of 1847, the old church was torn down. Construction of a new church on the same site was carried out from May 1847 until November 1848. The new building had about the same floor plan as the previous building on the site and architectural drawings by Hans Linstow were used. It was a wooden long church measuring about 17 by 8.5 metres (56 ft × 28 ft). The building had a church porch and tower on the west end of the nave which housed the altar as there was no separate choir in the building. Many of the salvageable materials from the previous church were reused in the construction of this building. The new church was consecrated on 5 November 1848 by the local dean, Johan Grønnlund.

In 1889, the church was remodeled with some significant changes, so much so that people said the church looked like a different building. Changes included a new tower and spire were built along with a new roof. A new 6-by-7-metre (20 ft × 23 ft) choir was constructed on the east end of the building. The interior of the building was also updated along with all new, larger windows. In 1938, an 8-by-5-metre (26 ft × 16 ft) addition was built on the north side of the choir which housed a sacristy and a smaller meeting room using designs by the architect Wilhelm Essendrop. In the 1960s, the church and parish were renamed from Vik to Viksdalen to distinguish it from another Vik Church in the region.

== Media gallery ==
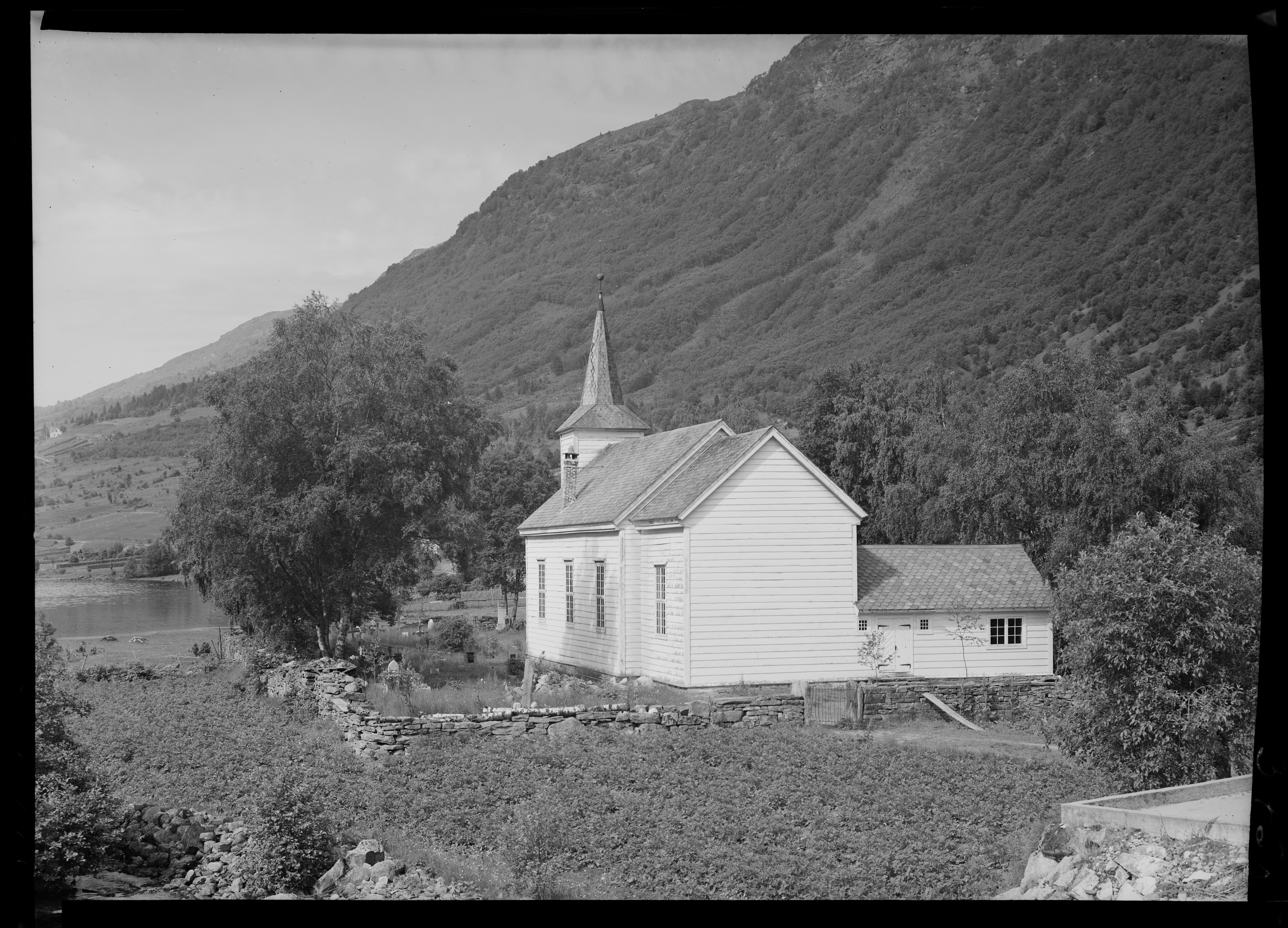

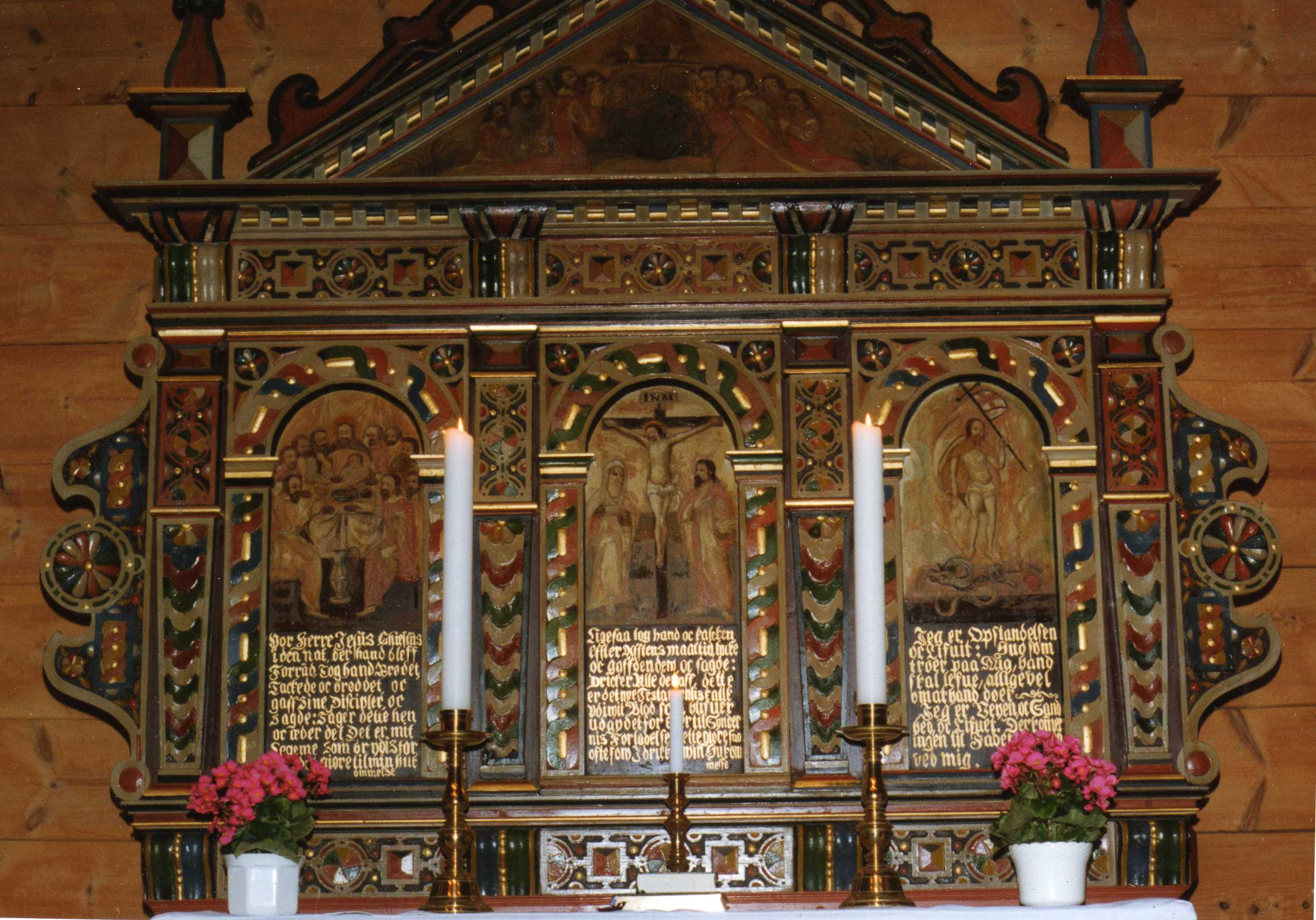

== See also ==
- List of churches in Bjørgvin
