= Bygstad =

Village in Vestland, Norway

- Village
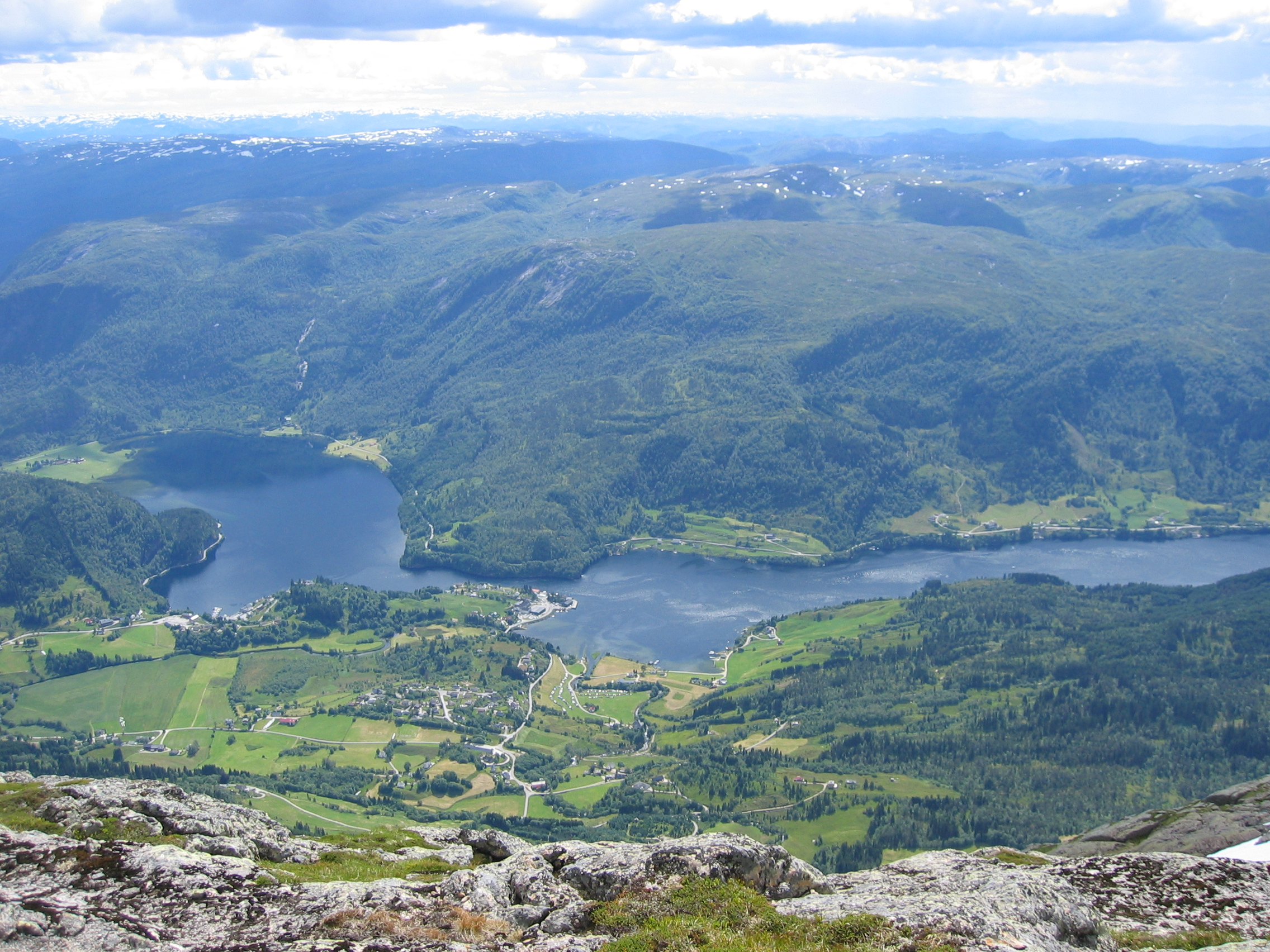
- View of the village in the foreground, along the fjord
- Interactive map of Bygstad
- Location within Vestland Location within Norway
- Coordinates: 61.37385°N 5.64068°E
- Country: Norway
- Region: Western Norway
- County: Vestland
- District: Sunnfjord
- Municipality: Sunnfjord Municipality
- Elevation: 2 m (6.6 ft)
- Time zone: UTC+01:00 (CET)
  - Summer (DST): UTC+02:00 (CEST)
- Post Code: 6977 Bygstad

Bygstad is a village in Sunnfjord Municipality in Vestland county, Norway. The village is located on the northern shore of the Dalsfjorden, about 2 kilometres (1.2 mi) northwest of the innermost part of the fjord. The village of Sande lies about 10 kilometres (6.2 mi) to the southeast of Bygstad and Førde Airport, Bringeland sits about 6 kilometres (3.7 mi) east of the village.

== History ==
The village is an old church site where there once was a stave church here dating back to the 13th century. The present Bygstad Church was built in 1845.

== Notable people ==
- Jenny Ellaug Følling, a Norwegian politician
- Kristian Lien, a Norwegian politician
