= Vik, Sunnfjord =

Village in Sunnfjord Municipality, Norway

Vik Vikja / Viken (unofficial)
- Village
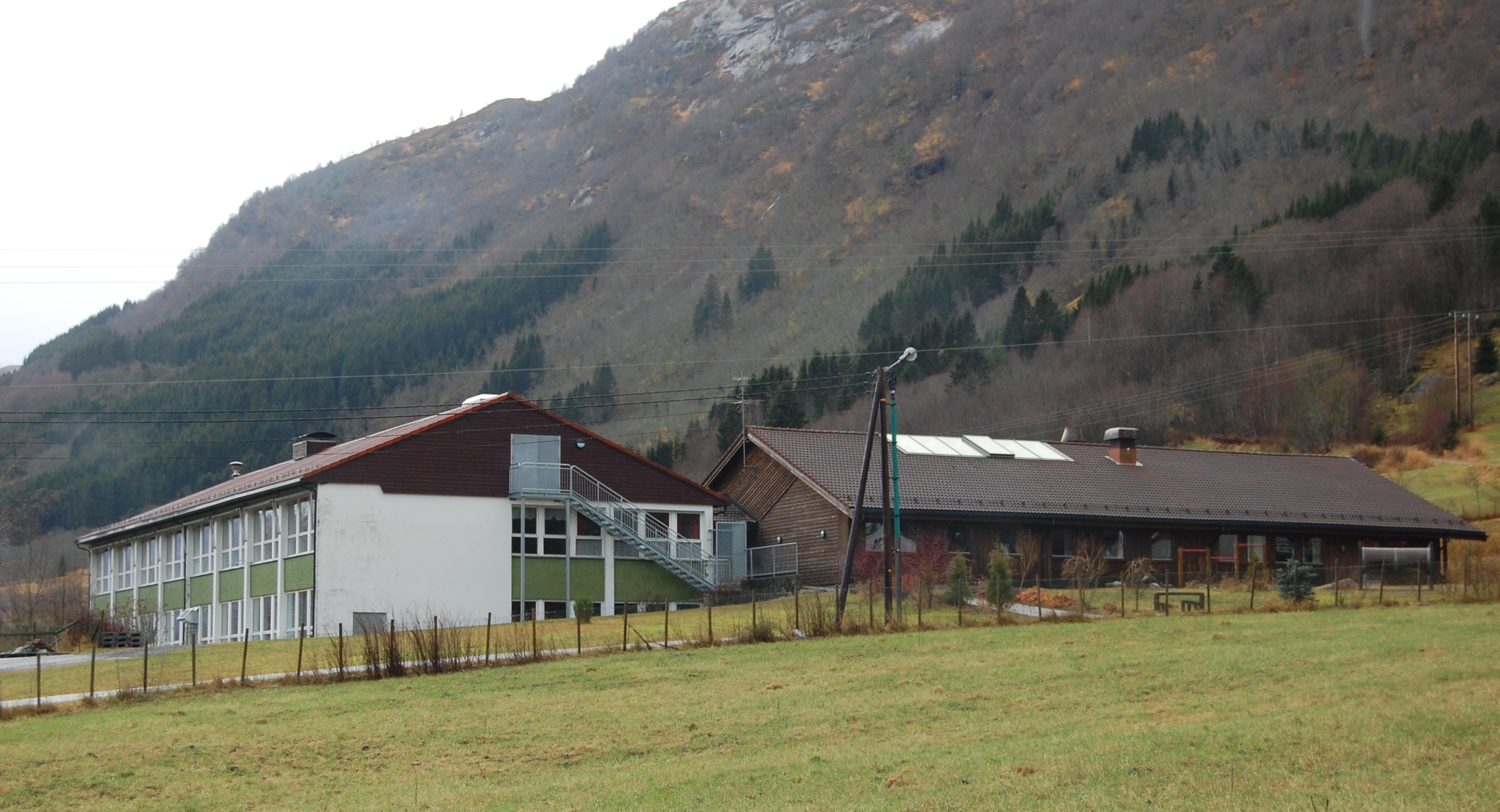
- View of the local school in Vik
- Interactive map of Vik
- Location within Vestland Location within Norway
- Coordinates: 61.35184°N 6.1167°E
- Country: Norway
- Region: Western Norway
- County: Vestland
- District: Sunnfjord
- Municipality: Sunnfjord Municipality
- Elevation: 151 m (495 ft)
- Time zone: UTC+01:00 (CET)
  - Summer (DST): UTC+02:00 (CEST)
- Post Code: 6978 Viksdalen

Vik is a village in Sunnfjord Municipality in Vestland county, Norway. The village is located on the north shore of the river Gaula, on the eastern end of the lake Viksdalsvatnet.

The Norwegian County Road 613 highway runs through Vik, on its way from Førde in the north to Balestrand in the south. The Viksdalen Church is located in the village, and it serves the people in the Viksdalen valley. This has been a church site for centuries. The first known church in Vik was named in historical records in 1360, so it was built sometime before then.

== History ==
The village was historically located in Gaular Municipality in Sogn og Fjordane county, before becoming part of Sunnfjord Municipality in Vestland county after the merging and creation of new municipalities and counties in Norway on 1 January 2020.
