= Gaula (Vestland) =

River in Vestland, Norway

Gaula River
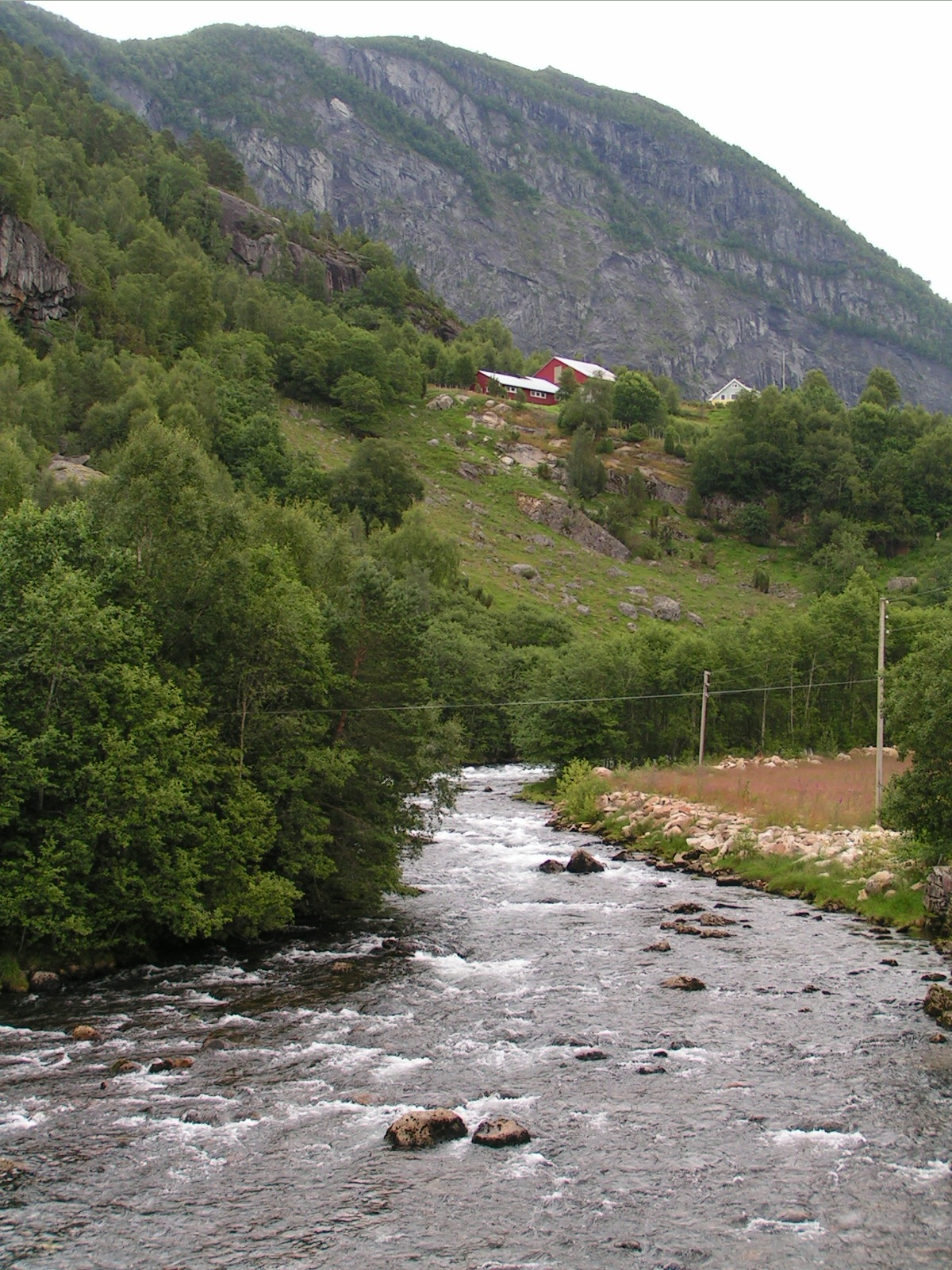
- Gaula river at the entrance to Viksdalsvatnet

Location
- Country: Norway
- County: Vestland
- Municipalities: Sunnfjord Municipality

Physical characteristics
- Source: Gaularfjellet mountains
  - location: Haukedalen, Norway
  - coordinates: 61.45230°N 6.56982°E
  - elevation: 775 metres (2,543 ft)
- 2nd source: Gaularfjellet mountains
  - location: Sogndal Municipality, Norway
  - coordinates: 61.35498°N 6.44588°E
  - elevation: 932 metres (3,058 ft)
- Mouth: Dalsfjorden
  - location: Sunnfjord Municipality, Norway
  - coordinates: 61.36704°N 5.68171°E
  - elevation: 0 metres (0 ft)
- Length: 63 km (39 mi)
- Basin size: 626 km^{2} (242 sq mi)

Gaula is a river located in the Sunnfjord region of Vestland county, Norway. The 63-kilometre (39 mi) long river is the central part of the Gaularvassdraget watershed basin which covers about 626 square kilometres (242 sq mi) across Sunnfjord Municipality and Sogndal Municipality. The river is a good salmon fishing river. The river was the namesake of the old Gaular Municipality.

== Course ==
The river begins as glacial runoff in the Gaularfjellet mountains and it runs through Sunnfjord Municipality and SogndalMunicipality. The glaciers that feed the river are Grovabreen, Jostefonni, and Troget, all three are located just west of the massive Jostedalsbreen glacier. The river starts up in the mountains and empties into a fjord at sea level, and so the water drops over 700 metres (2,300 ft) in elevation throughout its course. This is one reason why the area is often referred to as Fosselandet (lit. "the land of waterfalls"). There are many waterfalls on the Gaular and its tributaries.

The river Gaula begins as two main branches. The northern branch begins in the mountains east of the village of Haukedalen in Sunnfjord Municipality. That branch flows to the southwest eventually into the lake Viksdalsvatnet. The southern branch begins at the lake Norddalsvatnet on the border of Sunnfjord Municipality and Sogndal Municipality. It flows along the border, then south into Sogndal Municipality to the lake Nystølsvatnet. The river then turns west, back into Sunnfjord Municipality and it heads west until it empties into the lake Viksdalsvatnet. This lake is where the two branches join together. It then finishes its course by flowing westward, passing through the municipal center of Sande, before emptying into the Dalsfjorden at Osen near the village of Bygstad. The European route E39 highway crosses the river just east of the village of Sande.

== Media gallery ==
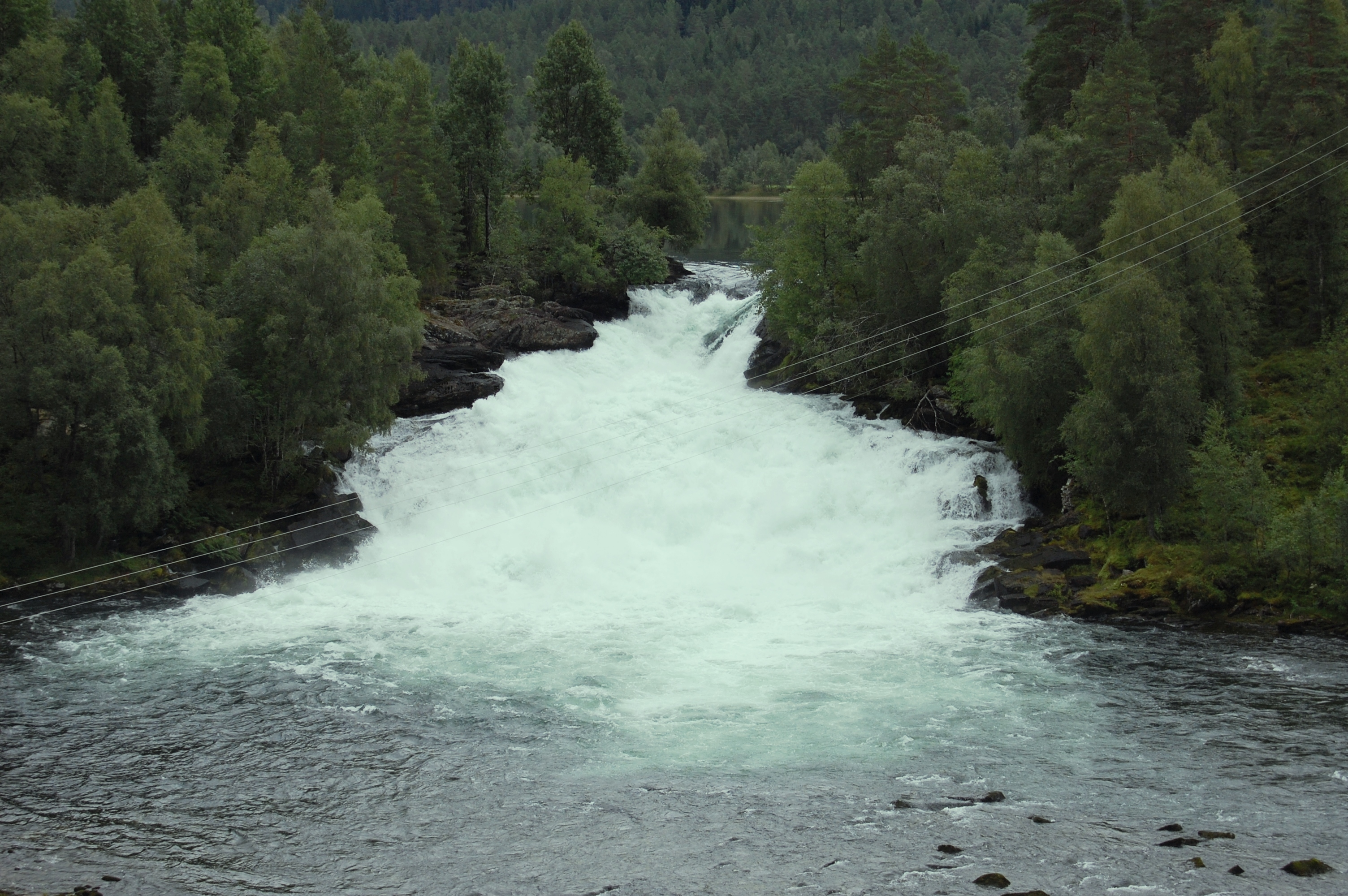
Fossfossen waterfall

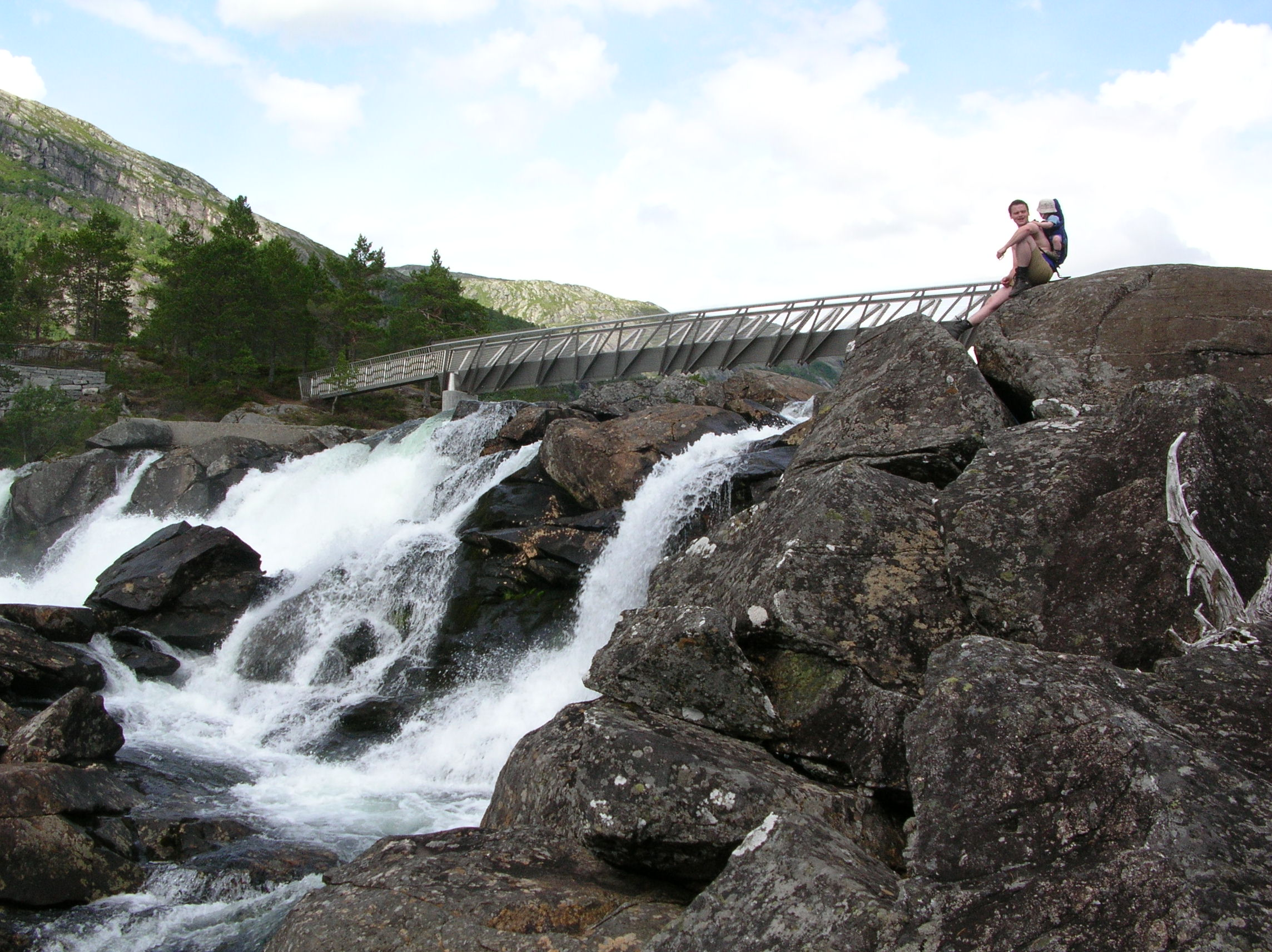
Likholefossen waterfall

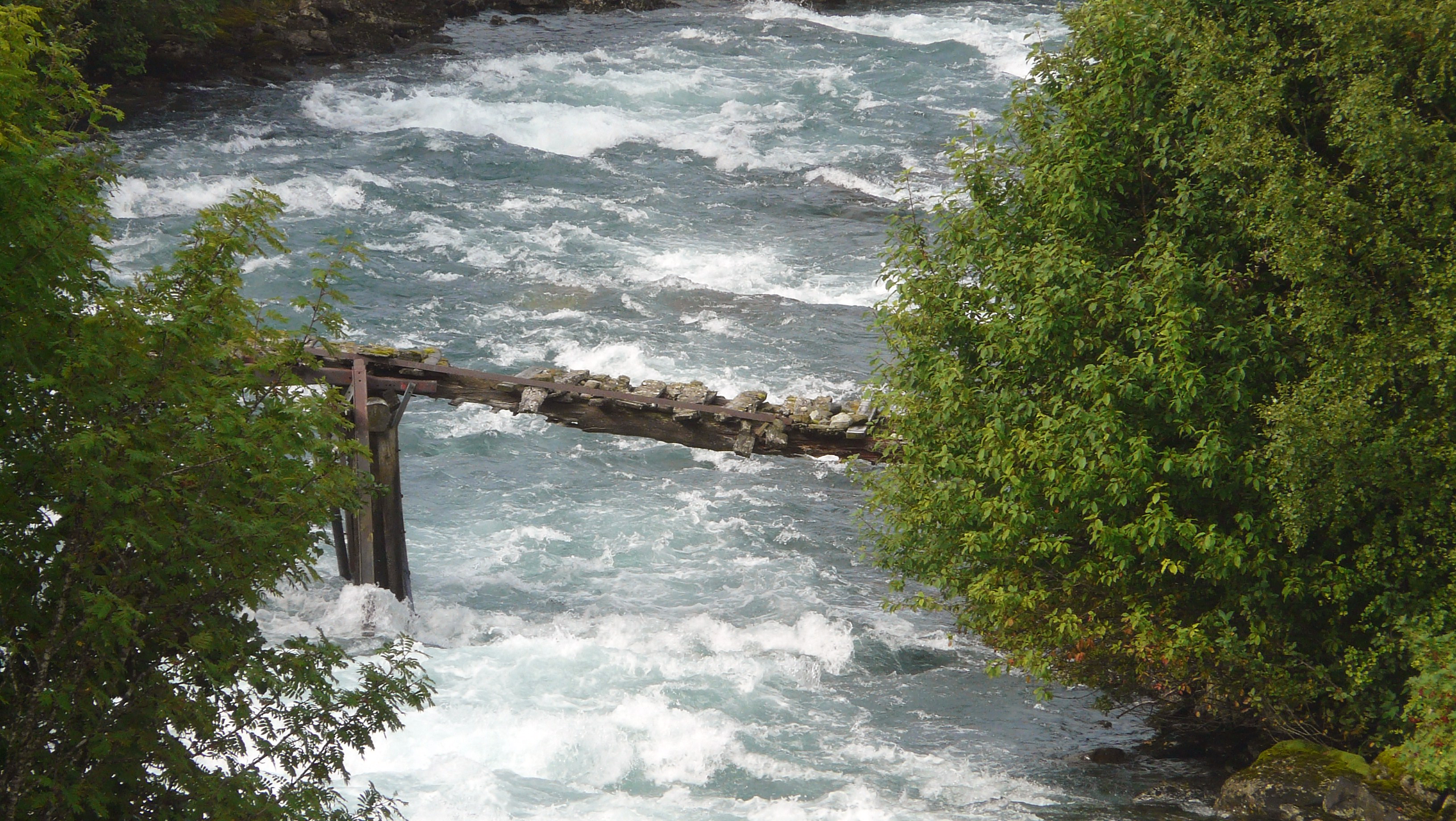
Small bridge over the northern branch of the river

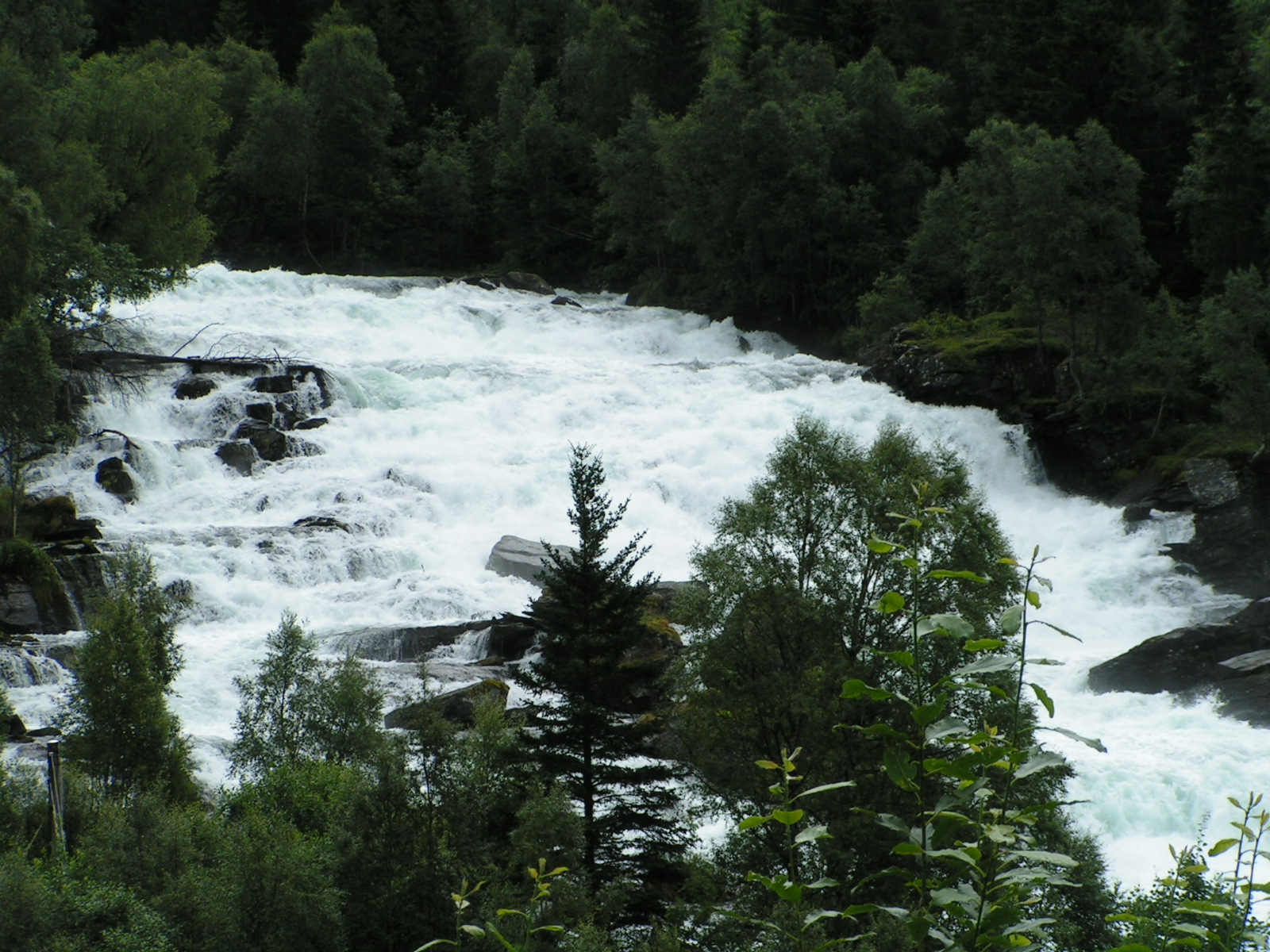
Vallestadfossen waterfall

== See also ==
- List of rivers in Norway
