= Sande, Vestland =

Village in Sunnfjord Municipality, Norway

Sande Sande i Sunnfjord
- Village
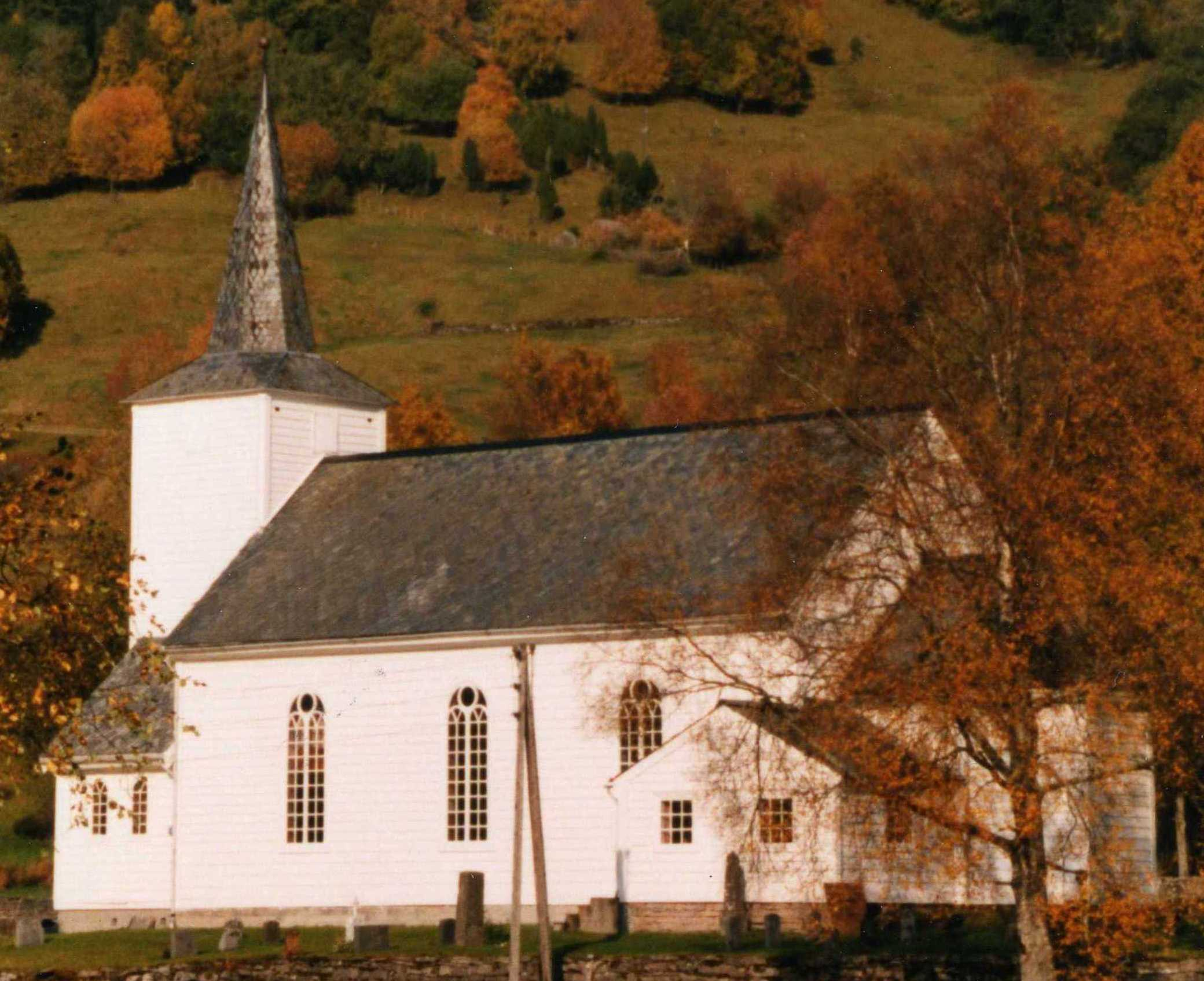
- Sande Church
- Interactive map of Sande
- Location within Vestland Location within Norway
- Coordinates: 61.32511°N 5.79775°E
- Country: Norway
- Region: Western Norway
- County: Vestland
- District: Sunnfjord
- Municipality: Sunnfjord Municipality

Area
  - Total: 0.71 km^{2} (0.27 sq mi)
- Elevation: 75 m (246 ft)

Population (2025)
  - Total: 1,019
  - Density: 1,435/km^{2} (3,720/sq mi)
- Time zone: UTC+01:00 (CET)
  - Summer (DST): UTC+02:00 (CEST)
- Post Code: 6973 Sande i Sunnfjord

Sande (also known as Sande i Sunnfjord) is a village in Sunnfjord Municipality in Vestland county, Norway. The village is located along the Gaula River, about 10 kilometres (6.2 mi) from where the river meets the Dalsfjorden. Sande Church is located in this village.

The 0.71-square-kilometre (180-acre) village has a population (2025) of 1,019 and a population density of 1,735 inhabitants per square kilometre (4,490/sq mi).

The European route E39 highway runs through the village of Sande, connecting it to the town of Førde 19 kilometres (12 mi) to the north and to the village of Vadheim in Høyanger Municipality which is 14 kilometres (8.7 mi) to the south. Førde Airport, Bringeland is located about 11 kilometres (6.8 mi) north of Sande along the E39 highway.

== History ==
The village was the administrative centre of the old Gaular Municipality until its dissolution in 2020.

== Notable people ==
- Wenche Nistad (born 1952), a businessperson and civil servant
