= Norwegian Guarantee Institute for Export Credits =

Norwegian Export Credit Guarantee Agency (GIEK)
- Formation: 1929
- Type: Government agency
- Purpose: Promoting Norwegian exports
- Headquarters: Aker Brygge, Oslo
- Location: Oslo, Norway
- Region served: Worldwide
- Official language: Norwegian
- CEO: Wenche Nistad
- Chair of the Board: Karin Bing Orgland
- Main organ: Board of Directors
- Volunteers: No
- Website: Official website

The Norwegian Export Credit Guarantee Agency (Norwegian: Garantiinstituttet for eksportkreditt, GIEK) is a public-sector enterprise that reports to the Ministry of Trade, Industry and Fisheries (MTIF). GIEK promotes Norwegian exports by issuing guarantees on behalf of the state. The guarantees help buyers abroad with financing, lower the risk of loss by Norwegian exporters and international buyers, and level the competitive playing field for Norwegian companies abroad. Norwegian state guarantees represent a high degree of security for exporters and banks alike.

The guarantees are tailored to the needs of Norwegian exporters and foreign buyers, covering both political and commercial risk linked to loans issued by private or public financial institutions. Guarantees may be provided only in cases where Norwegian goods or services are delivered abroad or an export transaction promotes Norwegian value creation in some other way. GIEK issues guarantees for exports to countries around the world.

GIEK is a supplement to the private banking and financial market, and is required to break even in the long run.

In addition to export guarantees, GIEK manages two domestic guarantee schemes, one for energy purchases and the other for shipbuilding at Norwegian shipyards.

CEO is Wenche Nistad. The board of directors elected in 2015 consists of Karin Bing Orgland (chair), Torfinn Kildal (deputy chair), John G. Bernander, Maria Borch Helsengreen, Marit E. Kirkhusmo, Arve Bakke and Nina Udnes Tronstad. The headquarters are at Aker Brygge, Oslo.
