= Førde Municipality =

Former municipality in Sogn og Fjordane county, Norway

Førde Municipality Førde kommune
- Former municipality
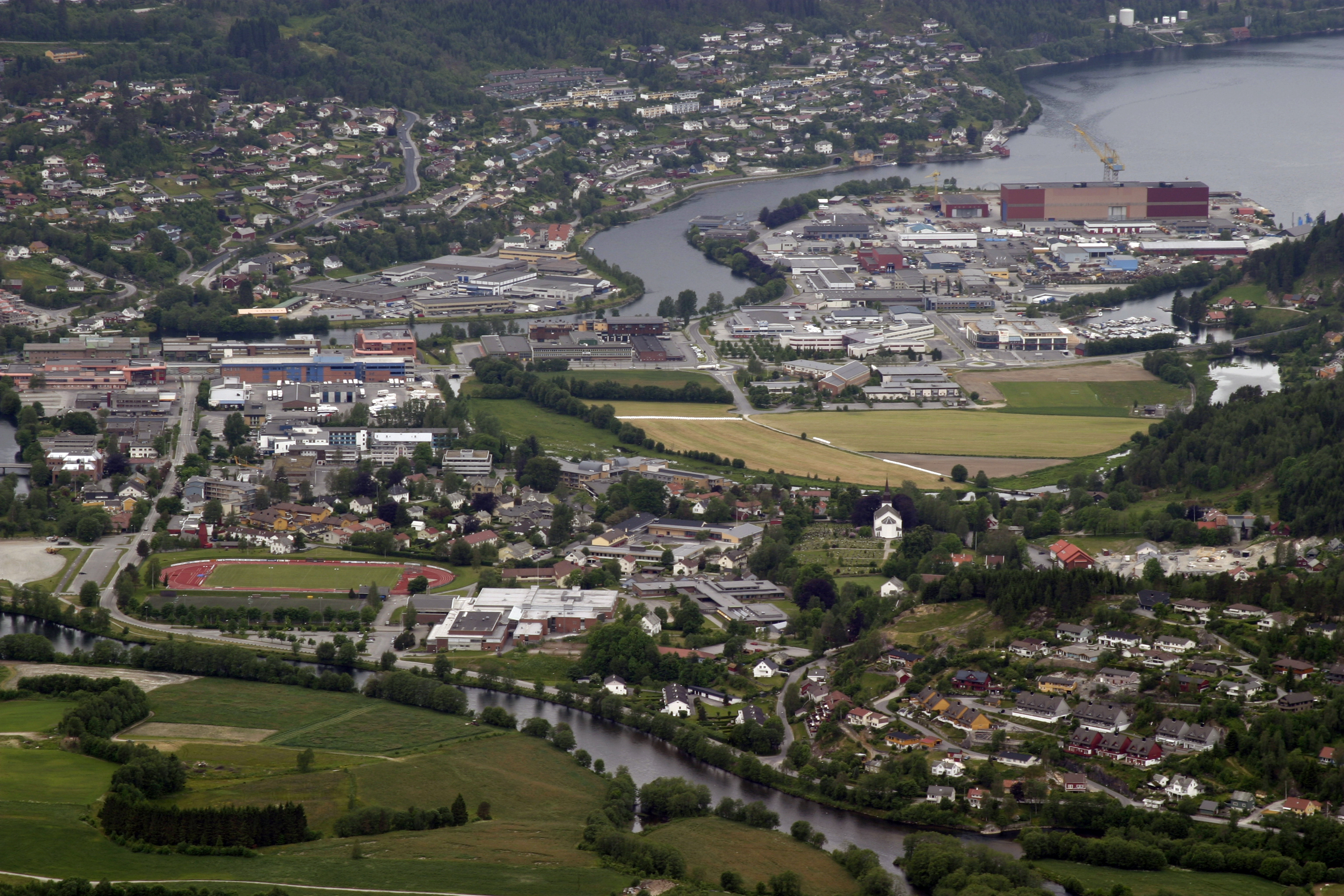
- Førde town center

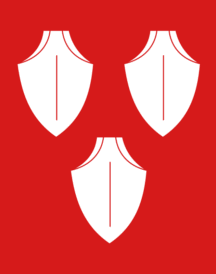
- Flag Coat of arms

- Sogn og Fjordane within Norway

- Førde within Sogn og Fjordane
- Coordinates: 61°26′35″N 05°54′13″E
- Country: Norway
- County: Sogn og Fjordane
- District: Sunnfjord
- Established: 1 Jan 1838
  - Created as: Formannskapsdistrikt
- Disestablished: 1 Jan 2020
  - Succeeded by: Sunnfjord Municipality
- Administrative centre: Førde

Government
  - Mayor (2011–2019): Olve Grotle (H)

Area (upon dissolution)
  - Total: 585.96 km^{2} (226.24 sq mi)
  - Land: 553.01 km^{2} (213.52 sq mi)
  - Water: 32.95 km^{2} (12.72 sq mi) 5.6%
  - Rank: #190 in Norway
- Highest elevation: 1,633 m (5,358 ft)

Population (2019)
  - Total: 13,092
  - Rank: #93 in Norway
  - Density: 22.3/km^{2} (58/sq mi)
  - Change (10 years): ▲ +10.6%
- Demonym: Førdianar

Official language
  - Norwegian form: Nynorsk
- Time zone: UTC+01:00 (CET)
  - Summer (DST): UTC+02:00 (CEST)
- ISO 3166 code: NO-1432

Førde is a former municipality in the old Sogn og Fjordane county, Norway. The 586-square-kilometre (226 sq mi) municipality existed from 1838 until its dissolution in 2020. The area is now part of Sunnfjord Municipality in the traditional district of Sunnfjord in Vestland county. The administrative centre was the town of Førde. Some notable villages in the municipality included Bruland, Holsen, Moskog, and Haukedalen. The Øyrane area within the town of Førde was a large industrial/commercial area for the region.

Prior to its dissolution in 2020, the 585.96-square-kilometre (226.24 sq mi) municipality was the 190th largest by area out of the 422 municipalities in Norway. Førde Municipality was the 93rd most populous municipality in Norway with a population of about 13,092. The municipality's population density was 22.3 inhabitants per square kilometre (58/sq mi) and its population had increased by 10.6% over the previous 10-year period.

The European Route E39 highway passed through the municipality, and it passed by the lake Holsavatnet. Førde Airport, Bringeland was the regional airport, located about 16 kilometres (9.9 mi) from the town centre with flights that connect Oslo and Bergen with Førde. The airport was actually located in the neighboring Gaular Municipality, just south of the border. The largest hospital in Sogn og Fjordane county, Førde Central Hospital, and the regional offices of the Norwegian Broadcasting Corporation are located in the town. The International Førde Folk Music Festival is held each summer. The local newspaper is called Firda.

== General information ==
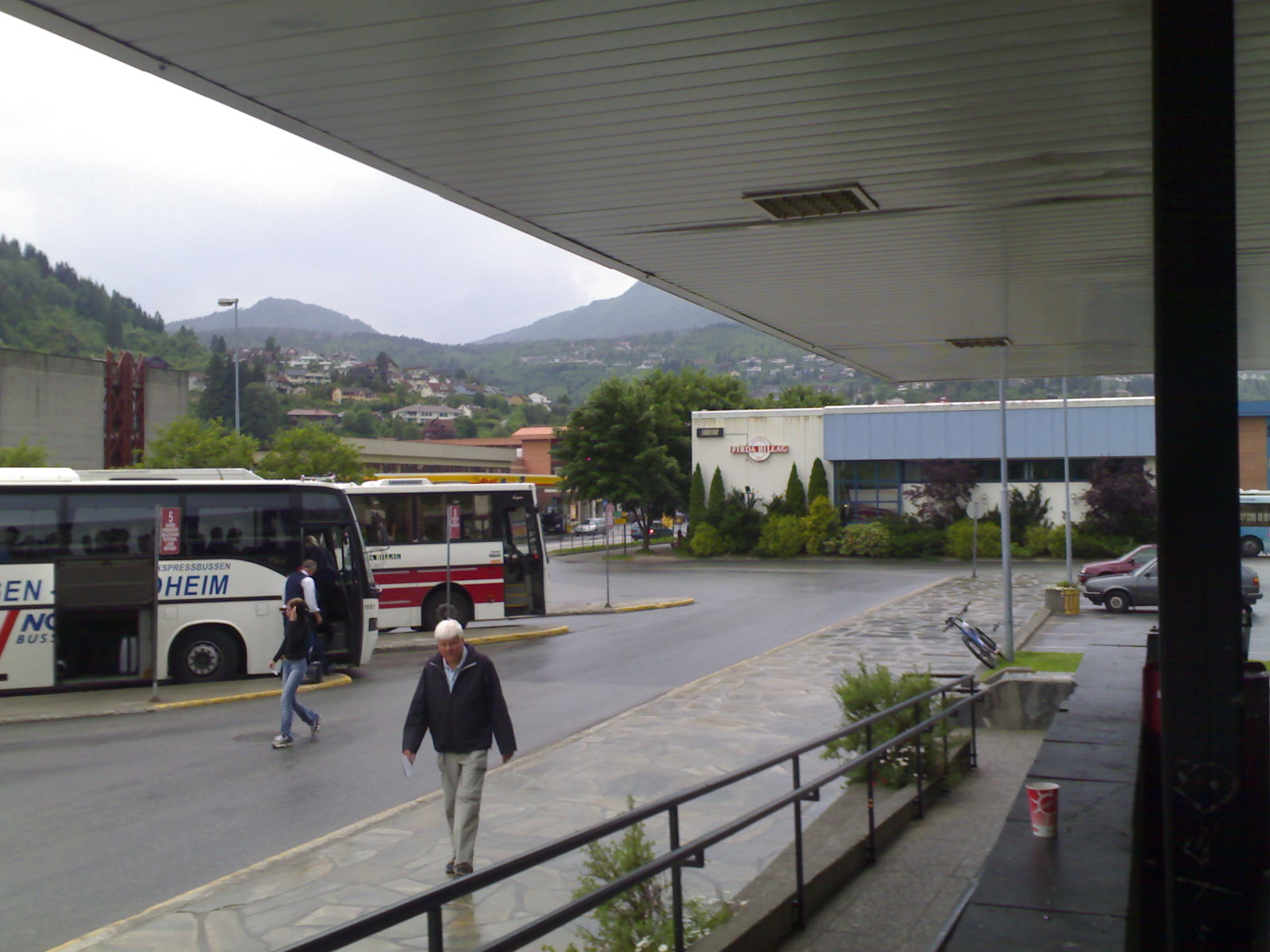
Førde bus station

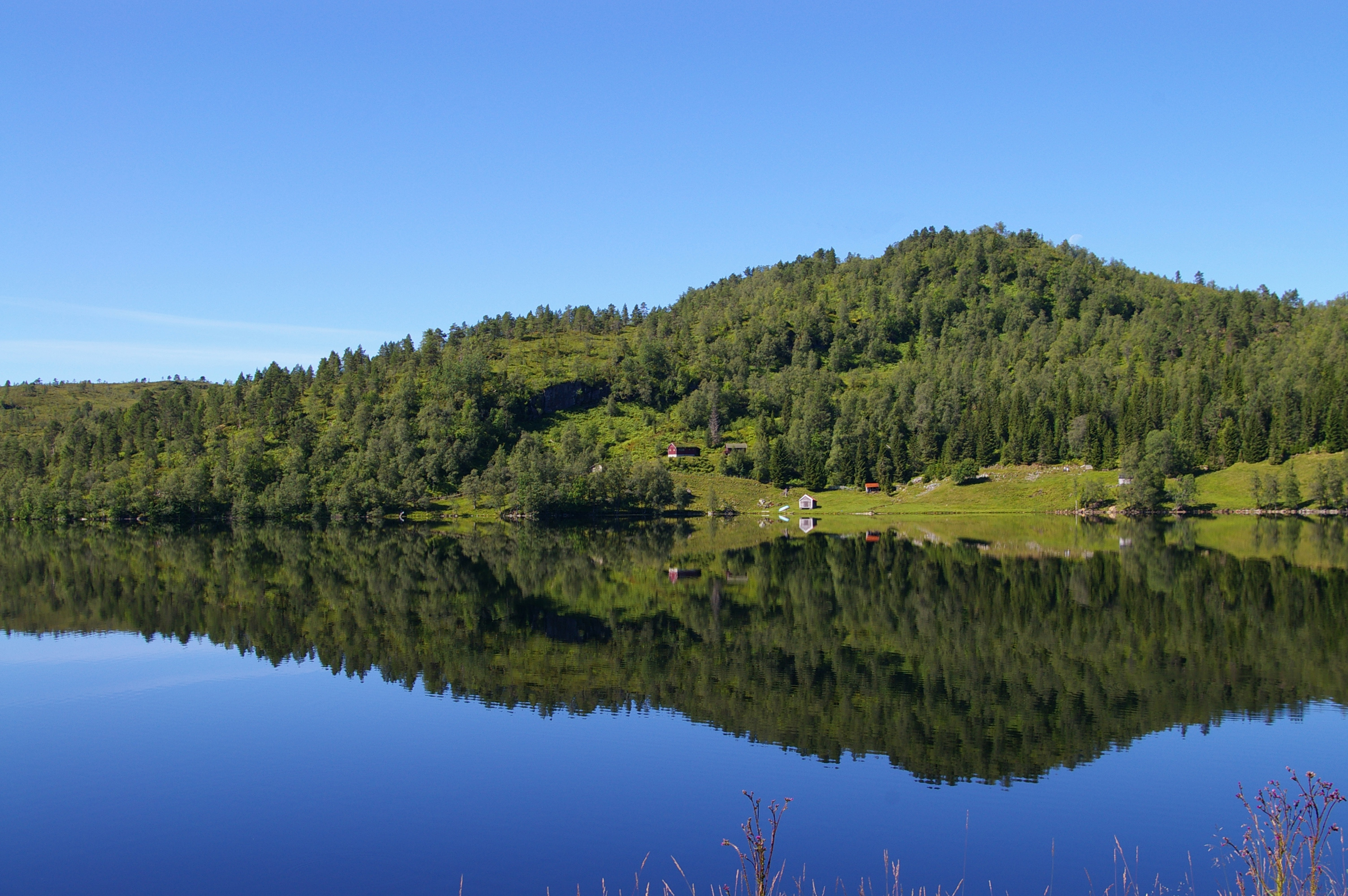
Lake Langeland

Førde was established as a municipality on 1 January 1838 (see formannskapsdistrikt law). The original municipality was identical to the Førde parish (prestegjeld) with the sub-parishes (sokn) of Førde, Holsen, and Naustdal.

On 1 January 1896, the northern sub-parish of Naustdal (population: 2,543) was separated from Førde Municipality to become the new Naustdal Municipality. This left Førde Municipality with 2,903 residents.

During the 1960s, there were many municipal mergers across Norway due to the work of the Schei Committee. On 1 January 1964, the areas of Naustdal Municipality that were located south of the Førdefjorden (population: 265) were transferred to Førde Municipality.

On 1 January 2020, Førde Municipality, Naustdal Municipality, Gaular Municipality, and Jølster Municipality were merged to form the new Sunnfjord Municipality.

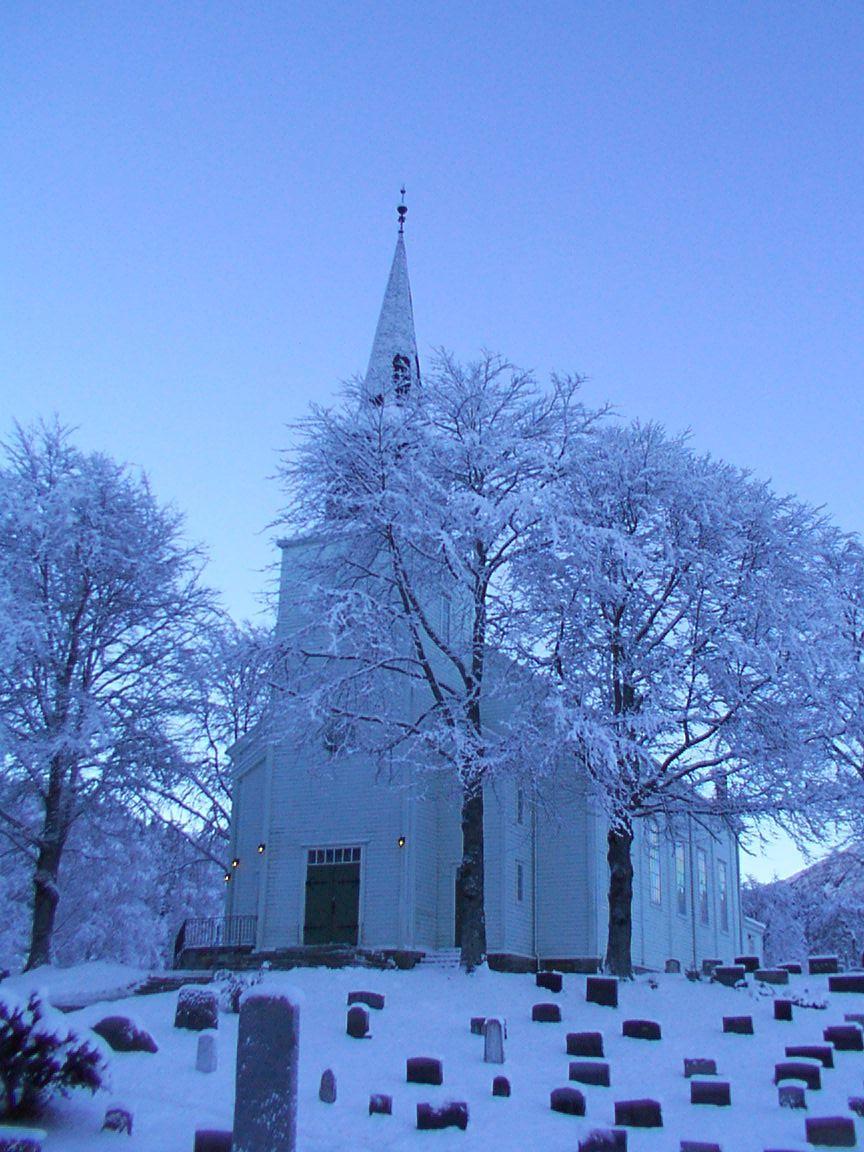
Førde Church

=== Name ===
The municipality (originally the parish) was named after the old Førde farm (Old Norse: Fjǫrðr [nominative] and Firði [dative]) since the first Førde Church was built there. The name is identical with the word fjǫrðr which means "firth" or "fjord", referring to the fjord now called Førdefjorden.

=== Coat of arms ===
The coat of arms was granted on 27 April 1990 and it was in use until 1 January 2020 when the municipality was dissolved. The official blazon is "Gules, three plowshares argent, two over one" (Norwegian: På raud grunn tre sølv plogjarn, 2-1). This means the arms have a red field (background) and the charge is a set of three plowshares. The charge has a tincture of argent which means it is commonly colored white, but if it is made out of metal, then silver is used. The design was chosen to symbolize the three pillars of the local economy: agriculture, horticulture, and development. The arms were designed by Inge Rotevatn. The municipal flag has the same design as the coat of arms.

=== Churches ===
The Church of Norway had two parishes (sokn) within Førde Municipality. It was part of the Sunnfjord prosti (deanery) in the Diocese of Bjørgvin.

Churches in Førde Municipality
Parish (sokn)	Church name	Location of the church	Year built
Førde	Førde Church	Førde	1885
Holsen og Haukedalen	Haukedalen Church	Haukedalen	1885
Holsen og Haukedalen	Holsen Church	Holsen	1861

== Geography ==
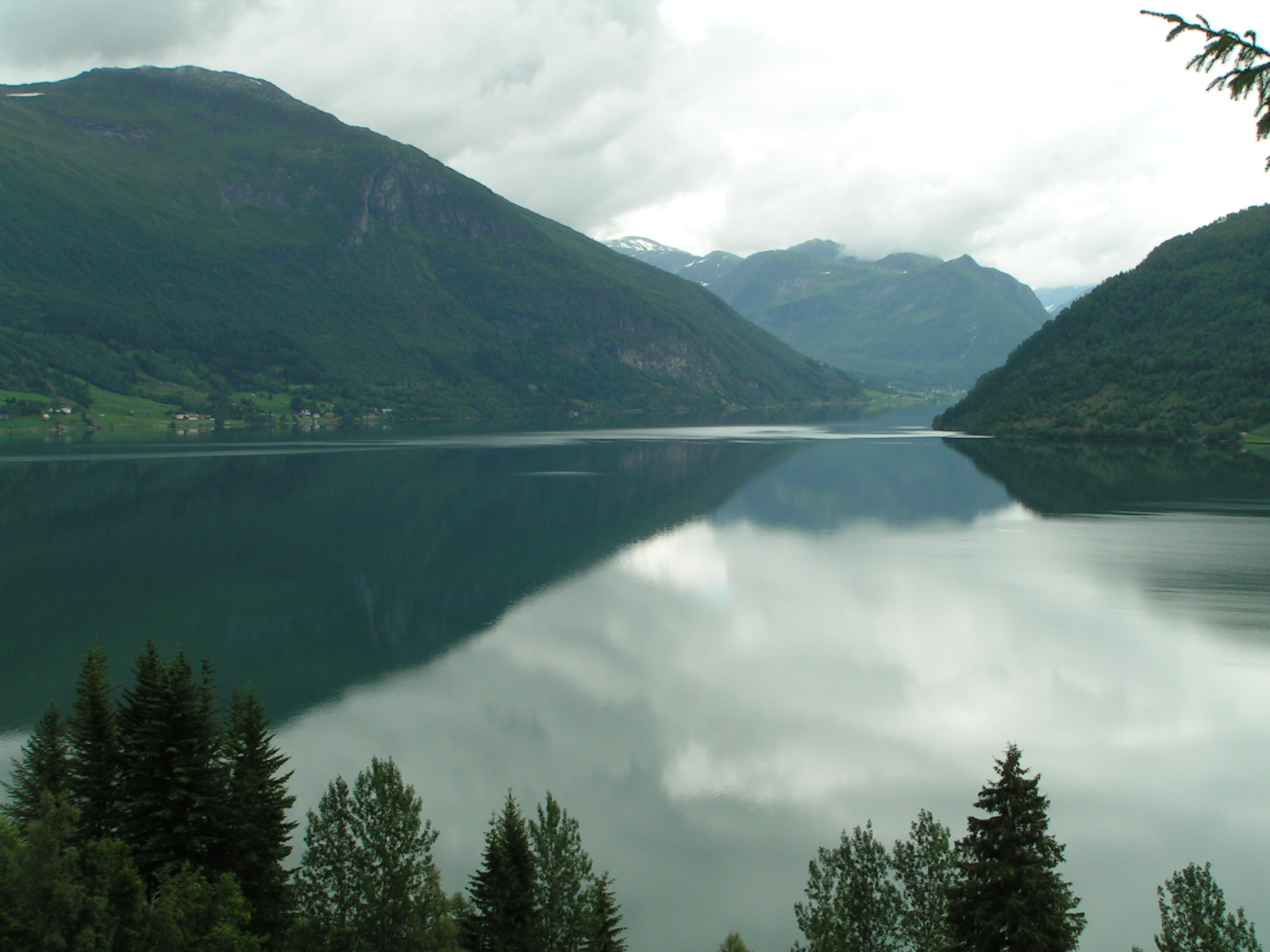
Lake Haukedalsvatnet

Førde Municipality encompassed the valleys that led away from the inner end of the Førdefjorden. Naustdal Municipality bordered Førde to the north, the municipalities of Jølster, Sogndal, and Balestrand were to the east, Gaular Municipality was to the south, and Askvoll Municipality was to the west. The two largest lakes in the municipality were Holsavatnet and Haukedalsvatnet. The rivers Jølstra and Gaula were both partially located in Førde Municipality. The Gaularfjellet mountains were located in the east and south of the municipality. The glaciers Grovabreen and Jostefonni were located in the eastern mountainous part of Førde Municipality. The westernmost edges of the Jostedalsbreen National Park were located in the Haukedalen valley in Førde Municipality. The highest point in the municipality was the 1,633-metre (5,358 ft) tall Grovabreen glacier.

== Government ==
While it existed, Førde Municipality was responsible for primary education (through 10th grade), outpatient health services, senior citizen services, welfare and other social services, zoning, economic development, and municipal roads and utilities. The municipality was governed by a municipal council of directly elected representatives. The mayor was indirectly elected by a vote of the municipal council. The municipality was under the jurisdiction of the Sogn og Fjordane District Court and the Gulating Court of Appeal.

=== Municipal council ===
The municipal council (Kommunestyre) of Førde Municipality was made up of 27 representatives that were elected to four year terms. The tables below show the historical composition of the council by political party.

Førde kommunestyre 2015–2019
Party name (in Nynorsk)	Number of representatives
Labour Party (Arbeidarpartiet)	9
Progress Party (Framstegspartiet)	1
Green Party (Miljøpartiet Dei Grøne)	1
Conservative Party (Høgre)	6
Christian Democratic Party (Kristeleg Folkeparti)	2
Centre Party (Senterpartiet)	4
Socialist Left Party (Sosialistisk Venstreparti)	2
Liberal Party (Venstre)	2
Total number of members:	27
Note: On 1 January 2020, Førde Municipality, Jølster Municipality, Gaular Municipality, and Naustdal Municipality were merged to form the new Sunnfjord Municipality.

Førde kommunestyre 2011–2015
Party name (in Nynorsk)	Number of representatives
Labour Party (Arbeidarpartiet)	7
Progress Party (Framstegspartiet)	2
Conservative Party (Høgre)	8
Christian Democratic Party (Kristeleg Folkeparti)	2
Centre Party (Senterpartiet)	3
Socialist Left Party (Sosialistisk Venstreparti)	3
Liberal Party (Venstre)	2
Total number of members:	27

Førde kommunestyre 2007–2011
Party name (in Nynorsk)	Number of representatives
Labour Party (Arbeidarpartiet)	7
Progress Party (Framstegspartiet)	2
Conservative Party (Høgre)	5
Christian Democratic Party (Kristeleg Folkeparti)	2
Centre Party (Senterpartiet)	6
Socialist Left Party (Sosialistisk Venstreparti)	3
Liberal Party (Venstre)	2
Total number of members:	27

Førde kommunestyre 2003–2007
Party name (in Nynorsk)	Number of representatives
Labour Party (Arbeidarpartiet)	4
Progress Party (Framstegspartiet)	2
Conservative Party (Høgre)	5
Christian Democratic Party (Kristeleg Folkeparti)	2
Red Electoral Alliance (Raud Valallianse)	1
Centre Party (Senterpartiet)	5
Socialist Left Party (Sosialistisk Venstreparti)	6
Liberal Party (Venstre)	2
Total number of members:	27

Førde kommunestyre 1999–2003
Party name (in Nynorsk)	Number of representatives
Labour Party (Arbeidarpartiet)	10
Progress Party (Framstegspartiet)	1
Conservative Party (Høgre)	7
Christian Democratic Party (Kristeleg Folkeparti)	5
Red Electoral Alliance (Raud Valallianse)	1
Centre Party (Senterpartiet)	6
Socialist Left Party (Sosialistisk Venstreparti)	3
Liberal Party (Venstre)	2
Total number of members:	35

Førde kommunestyre 1995–1999
Party name (in Nynorsk)	Number of representatives
Labour Party (Arbeidarpartiet)	12
Progress Party (Framstegspartiet)	1
Conservative Party (Høgre)	4
Christian Democratic Party (Kristeleg Folkeparti)	5
Red Electoral Alliance (Raud Valallianse)	1
Centre Party (Senterpartiet)	7
Socialist Left Party (Sosialistisk Venstreparti)	3
Liberal Party (Venstre)	2
Total number of members:	35

Førde kommunestyre 1991–1995
Party name (in Nynorsk)	Number of representatives
Labour Party (Arbeidarpartiet)	11
Progress Party (Framstegspartiet)	1
Conservative Party (Høgre)	5
Christian Democratic Party (Kristeleg Folkeparti)	4
Red Electoral Alliance (Raud Valallianse)	1
Centre Party (Senterpartiet)	9
Socialist Left Party (Sosialistisk Venstreparti)	3
Liberal Party (Venstre)	1
Total number of members:	35

Førde kommunestyre 1987–1991
Party name (in Nynorsk)	Number of representatives
Labour Party (Arbeidarpartiet)	10
Progress Party (Framstegspartiet)	2
Conservative Party (Høgre)	7
Christian Democratic Party (Kristeleg Folkeparti)	4
Red Electoral Alliance (Raud Valallianse)	1
Centre Party (Senterpartiet)	6
Socialist Left Party (Sosialistisk Venstreparti)	2
Liberal Party (Venstre)	3
Total number of members:	35

Førde kommunestyre 1983–1987
Party name (in Nynorsk)	Number of representatives
Labour Party (Arbeidarpartiet)	9
Progress Party (Framstegspartiet)	1
Conservative Party (Høgre)	7
Christian Democratic Party (Kristeleg Folkeparti)	5
Liberal People's Party (Liberale Folkepartiet)	1
Red Electoral Alliance (Raud Valallianse)	1
Centre Party (Senterpartiet)	7
Socialist Left Party (Sosialistisk Venstreparti)	2
Liberal Party (Venstre)	2
Total number of members:	35

Førde kommunestyre 1979–1983
Party name (in Nynorsk)	Number of representatives
Labour Party (Arbeidarpartiet)	7
Conservative Party (Høgre)	10
Christian Democratic Party (Kristeleg Folkeparti)	6
New People's Party (Nye Folkepartiet)	2
Centre Party (Senterpartiet)	7
Socialist Left Party (Sosialistisk Venstreparti)	1
Liberal Party (Venstre)	2
Total number of members:	35

Førde kommunestyre 1975–1979
Party name (in Nynorsk)	Number of representatives
Labour Party (Arbeidarpartiet)	9
Conservative Party (Høgre)	5
Christian Democratic Party (Kristeleg Folkeparti)	5
New People's Party (Nye Folkepartiet)	7
Centre Party (Senterpartiet)	8
Liberal Party (Venstre)	1
Total number of members:	35

Førde kommunestyre 1971–1975
Party name (in Nynorsk)	Number of representatives
Labour Party (Arbeidarpartiet)	9
Conservative Party (Høgre)	3
Christian Democratic Party (Kristeleg Folkeparti)	4
Centre Party (Senterpartiet)	8
Liberal Party (Venstre)	5
Total number of members:	29

Førde kommunestyre 1967–1971
Party name (in Nynorsk)	Number of representatives
Labour Party (Arbeidarpartiet)	7
Conservative Party (Høgre)	3
Christian Democratic Party (Kristeleg Folkeparti)	5
Centre Party (Senterpartiet)	9
Liberal Party (Venstre)	5
Total number of members:	29

Førde kommunestyre 1963–1967
Party name (in Nynorsk)	Number of representatives
Labour Party (Arbeidarpartiet)	8
Conservative Party (Høgre)	1
Christian Democratic Party (Kristeleg Folkeparti)	5
Centre Party (Senterpartiet)	11
Liberal Party (Venstre)	4
Total number of members:	29

Førde heradsstyre 1959–1963
Party name (in Nynorsk)	Number of representatives
Labour Party (Arbeidarpartiet)	7
Conservative Party (Høgre)	2
Christian Democratic Party (Kristeleg Folkeparti)	3
Centre Party (Senterpartiet)	9
Liberal Party (Venstre)	4
Total number of members:	25

Førde heradsstyre 1955–1959
Party name (in Nynorsk)	Number of representatives
Labour Party (Arbeidarpartiet)	6
Conservative Party (Høgre)	2
Christian Democratic Party (Kristeleg Folkeparti)	3
Farmers' Party (Bondepartiet)	9
Liberal Party (Venstre)	5
Total number of members:	25

Førde heradsstyre 1951–1955
Party name (in Nynorsk)	Number of representatives
Labour Party (Arbeidarpartiet)	6
Conservative Party (Høgre)	1
Christian Democratic Party (Kristeleg Folkeparti)	3
Farmers' Party (Bondepartiet)	10
Liberal Party (Venstre)	4
Total number of members:	24

Førde heradsstyre 1947–1951
Party name (in Nynorsk)	Number of representatives
Labour Party (Arbeidarpartiet)	4
Christian Democratic Party (Kristeleg Folkeparti)	3
Farmers' Party (Bondepartiet)	6
Liberal Party (Venstre)	3
Local List(s) (Lokale lister)	8
Total number of members:	24

Førde heradsstyre 1945–1947
Party name (in Nynorsk)	Number of representatives
Labour Party (Arbeidarpartiet)	5
Farmers' Party (Bondepartiet)	7
Liberal Party (Venstre)	4
Local List(s) (Lokale lister)	8
Total number of members:	24

Førde heradsstyre 1937–1941*
Party name (in Nynorsk)	Number of representatives
Labour Party (Arbeidarpartiet)	4
Farmers' Party (Bondepartiet)	3
Liberal Party (Venstre)	6
Joint List(s) of Non-Socialist Parties (Borgarlege Felleslister)	3
Local List(s) (Lokale lister)	8
Total number of members:	24
Note: Due to the German occupation of Norway during World War II, no elections were held for new municipal councils until after the war ended in 1945.

=== Mayors ===
The mayor (Nynorsk: ordførar) of Førde Municipality was the political leader of the municipality and the chairperson of the municipal council. The following people have held this position:

- 1838–1839: Andreas Gunnerus Lind
- 1840–1841: Dr. Heinrich Rachlev
- 1842–1845: S. Steen
- 1846–1849: J.F. Boyesen
- 1850–1858: Rev. Søren Hjelm Friis
- 1858–1869: Th. F. Christensen
- 1870–1874: C.J. Steen
- 1875–1881: Nils Hafstad
- 1882–1893: Albert Steen
- 1894–1895: G.B. Thune
- 1896–1897: Ole Martinus Erdal
- 1898–1904: Johannes Kvaal
- 1905–1914: Ole Martinus Erdal
- 1914–1933: Olai Tefre
- 1934–1945: A.G. Holsen
- 1946–1951: Lars Hustveit
- 1952–1963: Bertel Flaten (V)
- 1963–1968: Erik Hagen (Sp)
- 1968–1979: Reidar Tveit (V/DLF)
- 1980–1981: Helge Barstad (H)
- 1982–1983: Lars Gunnar Lie (KrF)
- 1984–1987: Sverre Øygard (Sp)
- 1988–2003: Aud Viken (Ap)
- 2003–2003: Wilhelm Sandal (KrF)
- 2003–2011: Nils Gjerland (Sp)
- 2011–2019: Olve Grotle (H)

== Attractions ==
=== Waterfalls ===
- Huldefossen: Located approximately 10 kilometres (6.2 mi) from the town of Førde, it is a 90 metres (300 ft) tall waterfall into the peaceful valley below.
- Halbrendsfossen: located a short walk from the Førde town center. It is a very powerful waterfall in the spring.

=== The Salmon ===
The Salmon is a 65 metres (213 ft) long stone sculpture which is Norway's longest individual sculpture. It was created by Jørn Rønnau. It blends naturally in with the green surroundings on the banks of the river Jølstra, close to the Førdehuset cultural centre.

=== Førdehuset ===
Førdehuset (literal meaning: the Førde house) is a regional cultural centre, a cornerstone for cultural life in Western Norway. The centre is centrally located in the town of Førde, surrounded by a sports complex, amphitheatre, and is next door to the County Gallery. A multitude of cultural activities are gathered together under one roof - small and large attractions/events the whole year round.

=== National Tourist Road ===
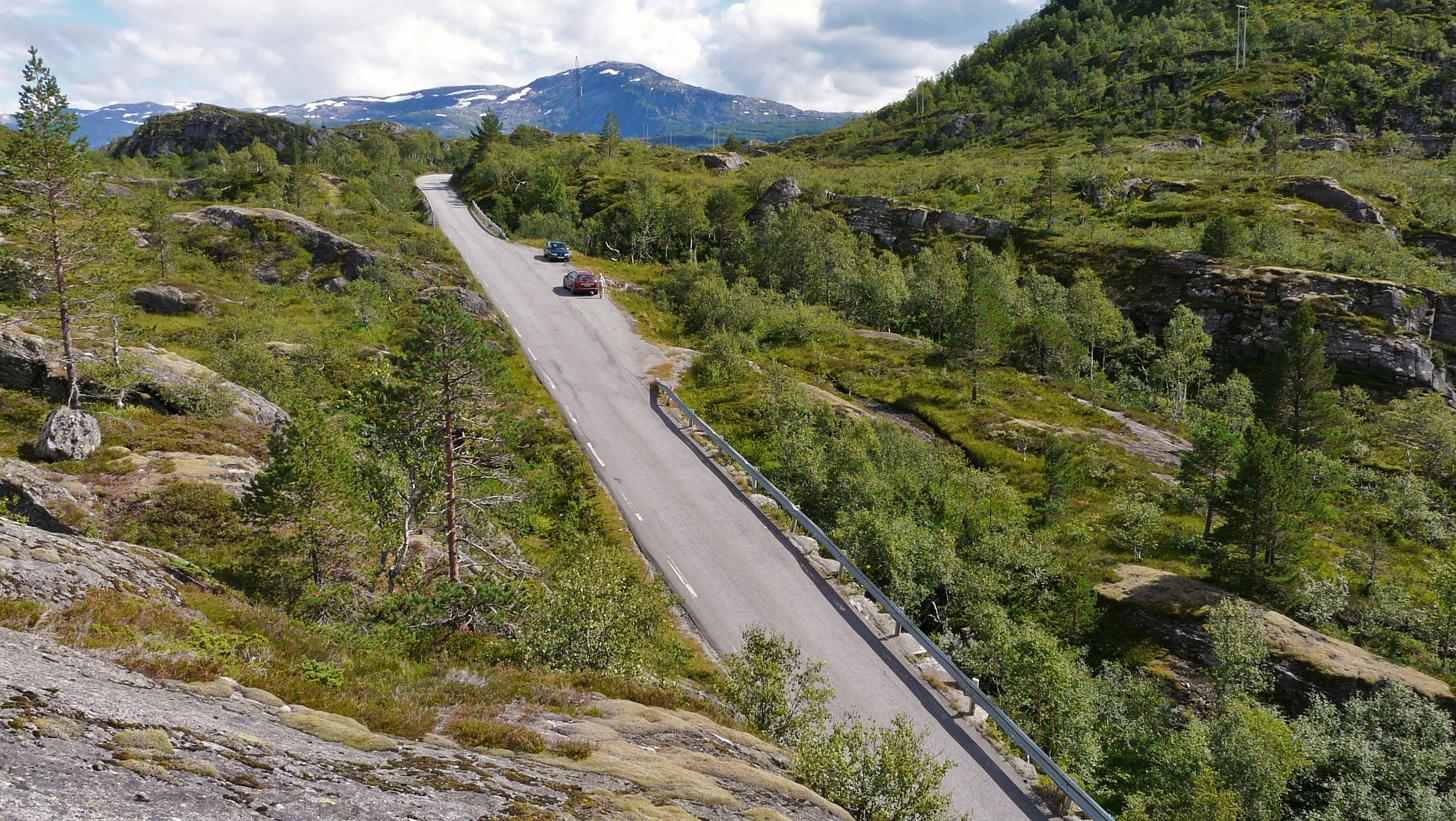
View of Fv13

Norwegian County Road 13 (Fv13) is one of 18 national tourist roads in Norway because of the nearby waterfalls. From Førde, drivers start on a sightseeing journey with cultural attractions that date from the 19th century to the present day's city environment. The districts of Holsen and Haukedalen are typical of Western Norwegian farming communities that have created a picturesque cultivated landscape.

Rørvik Mountain, the trail with the stone walls and a view over Haukedalen. Along Råheimsdalen and Eldalen to the Gaularfjellet mountains, visitors will see a waterfall landscape that has been landscaped with paths for visitors. From the top of Gaularfjell mountains, hairpin bends wind down to the Vetlefjorden, an arm of the Sognefjorden. The contrasts of steep mountainsides, winding roads, and waterfalls are characteristic of Western Norway’s exceptional scenery.

=== Sunnfjord Museum ===
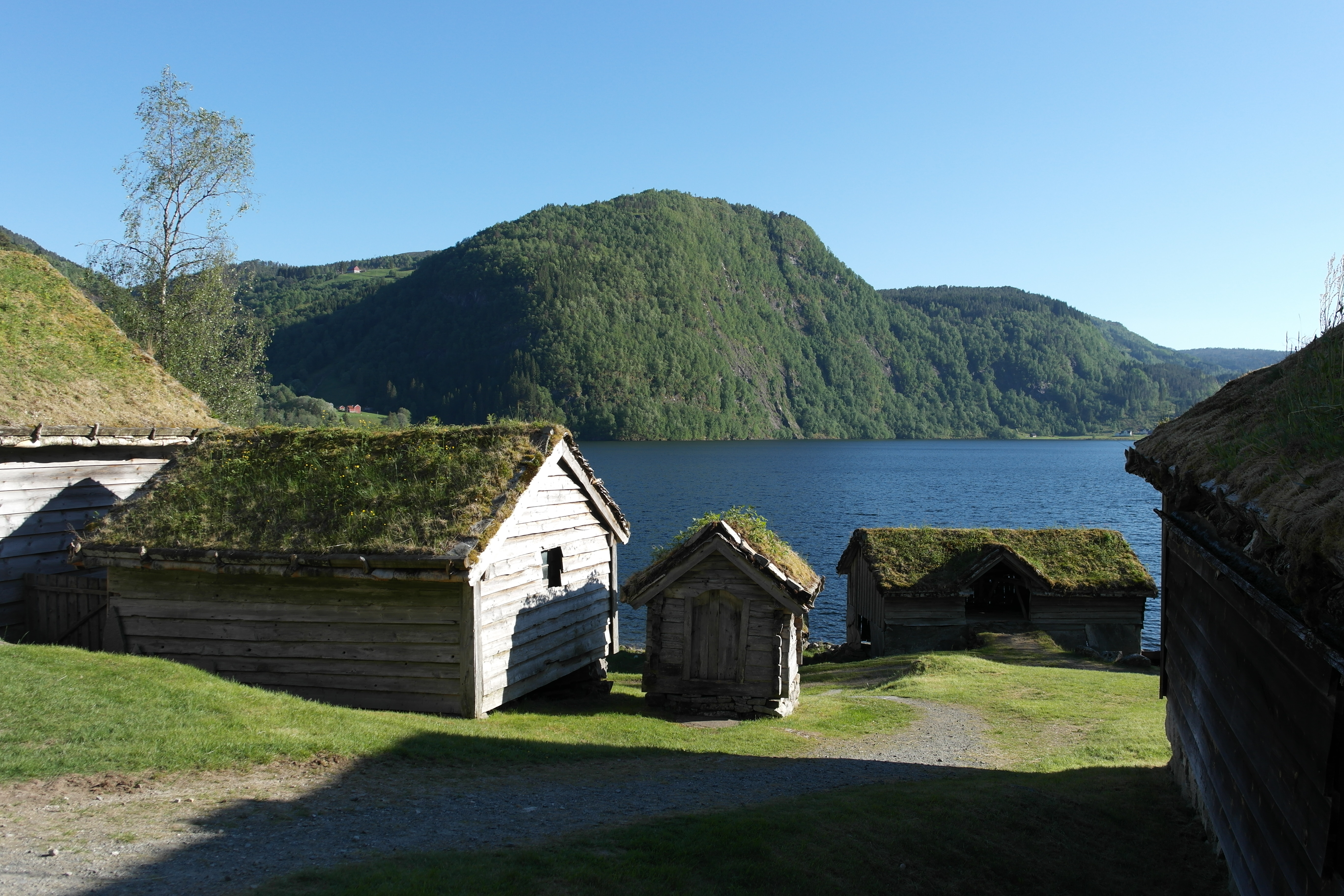
Sunnfjord Museum

The Sunnfjord Museum is one of four district museums in Sogn og Fjordane County. The main courtyard of the outdoor museum is a cluster of 25 restored antiquarian buildings sited in a cultural landscape representative of the same period. These buildings provide an insight into life and lifestyles in the Sunnfjord districts around the middle of the 19th century. The land tenant's home is on its original site with the interior as it was at the end of the 19th century. In June, July and August, there are daily guided tours through the old buildings.

== Sister cities ==
Førde has sister city agreements with the following places:

- La Crosse, Wisconsin, United States.
- Kent, Washington, United States. Each year two students ages 14–17 are exchanged between the two cities to be youth ambassadors of their country.

== See also ==
- List of former municipalities of Norway
