= Bjarte Eikeset =

Norwegian lawyer, judge and politician

Bjarte Erling Eikeset (22 February 1937 – 22 April 2017) was a Norwegian lawyer, judge and politician for the Conservative Party.

He was born in Førde Municipality. He graduated from the University of Oslo with a cand.jur. degree in 1964, and at that institution he was a research assistant from 1964 to 1965 and lecturer from 1965 to 1969. From 1969 to 1980 he worked as a lawyer in Førde, from 1976 with access to Supreme Court cases. In 1980 he was promoted to district stipendiary magistrate for the Sunnfjord District Court. In 1993 he applied, unsuccessfully, for the position as County Governor of Sogn og Fjordane. He remained in Sunnfjord except for the years 1981 to 1983, and in 2004 he moved to the district stipendiary magistrate chair Fjordane. He retired in 2007 due to the age limit of 70 years.

Eikeset became involved in local politics as an elected member of the municipal council of Førde Municipality from 1972 to 1975 and Sogn og Fjordane county council from 1976 to 1983. He chaired the county party chapter from 1973 to 1976. In 1981, when the Willoch's First Cabinet assumed office, he was appointed State Secretary in the Ministry of the Environment. He held this position until 1983. He served as a deputy representative to the Parliament of Norway from Sogn og Fjordane during the terms 1981–1985 and 1985–1989. In total he met during 66 days of parliamentary session.

Eikeset was a board member of the Norwegian Association of Judges from 1992 to 2000 and Sogn og Fjordane Energi from 1992 to 1995, and chair of Sogn og Fjordane Energi from 1988 to 1991. He has also been a board member of Den norske Bank's branch in Førde. He died at Haukeland University Hospital on 22 April 2017, four days after colliding with an RV at Storebru near Eikefjord.
