= Holsen Church =

Church in Vestland, Norway

- Holsen kyrkje
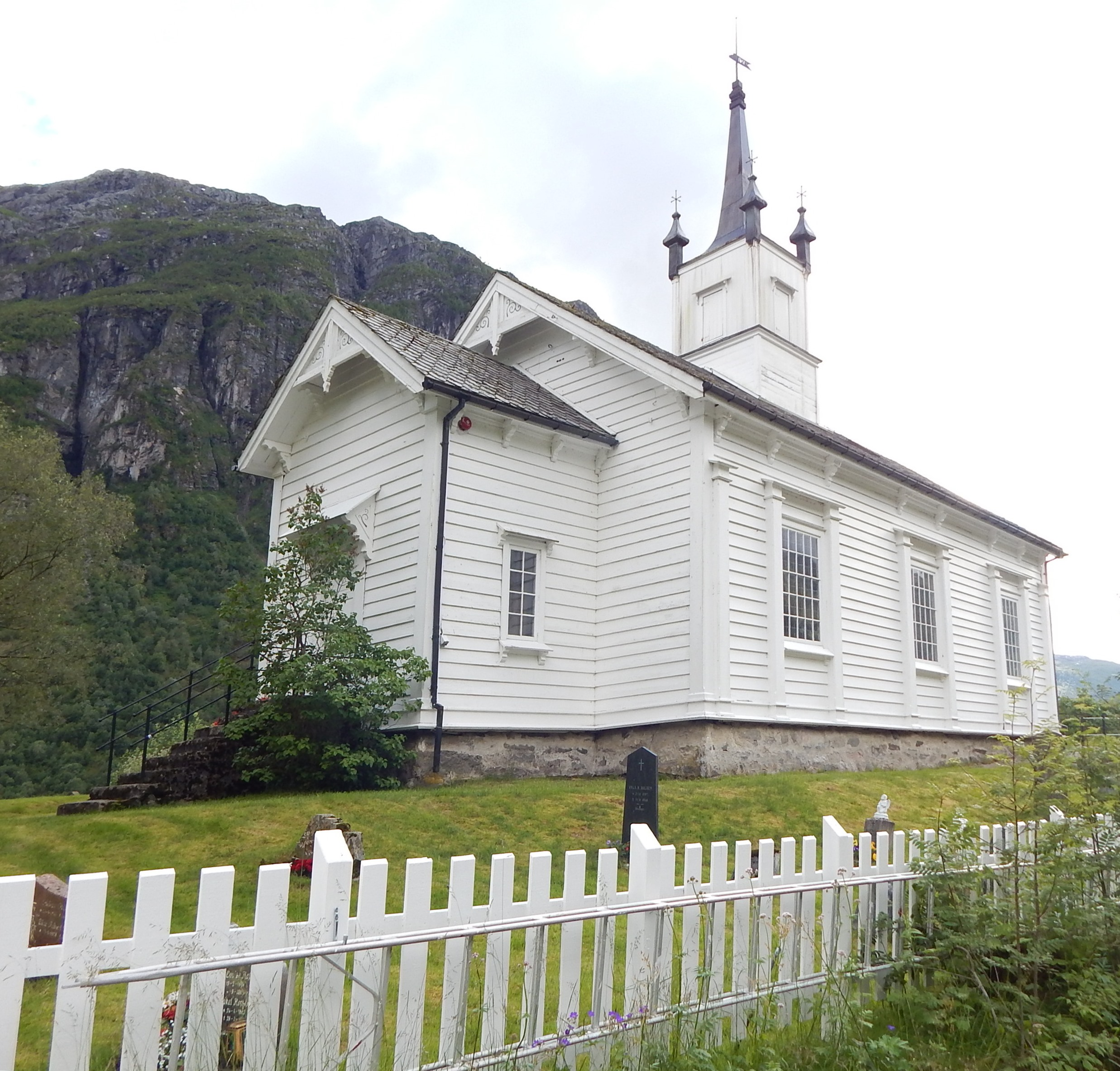
- View of the church
- Holsen Church
- 61°25′07″N 6°09′16″E
- Location: Sunnfjord Municipality, Vestland
- Country: Norway
- Denomination: Church of Norway
- Previous denomination: Catholic Church
- Churchmanship: Evangelical Lutheran

History
- Status: Parish church
- Founded: 13th century
- Consecrated: 11 Dec 1861

Architecture
- Functional status: Active
- Architect: Jacob Wilhelm Nordan
- Architectural type: Long church
- Completed: 1861 (165 years ago)

Specifications
- Capacity: 200
- Materials: Wood

Administration
- Diocese: Bjørgvin bispedømme
- Deanery: Sunnfjord prosti
- Parish: Holsen og Haukedalen
- Norwegian Cultural Heritage Site
- Type: Church
- Status: Listed
- ID: 84612

Holsen Church (Norwegian: Holsen kyrkje) is a parish church of the Church of Norway in Sunnfjord Municipality in Vestland county, Norway. It is located in the village of Holsen. It is one of the two churches for the Holsen og Haukedalen parish which is part of the Sunnfjord prosti (deanery) in the Diocese of Bjørgvin. The white, wooden church was built in a long church style in 1861 using designs by the architect Jacob Wilhelm Nordan. The church seats about 200 people.

== History ==
The earliest existing historical records of the church date back to the year 1330, but the church was not new that year. The first church in Holsen was likely a wooden stave church that was located about 100 metres (330 ft) southeast of the present church site. The church was likely built during the 13th century. From the 13th century until the 17th century, the people of the nearby Haukedalen valley also belonged to the Holsen Church parish, before their own Haukedalen Church was built in the mid-1600s.The nearly 500-year-old church was one of the last stave churches that was still standing in the Sunnfjord district when it was torn down around 1722.

After the old church was torn down in 1722, a new timber-framed church was built about 100 metres (330 ft) to the northwest. The old church site was somewhat of a wetland area and it was prone to flooding. The new church sits near the mouth of the river Norddøla and the lake Holsavatnet. In 1861, the small timber-framed church was torn down and a new church was built on the same site. The new building was built by Gjert Lien according to drawings by Jacob Wilhelm Nordan. The new church was consecrated on 11 December 1861 by the local Dean Johan Christie.

== Building ==
The church has a symmetrical appearance, with a steeple in the middle of the roof over the center of the nave. The porch to the west and the vestry to the east are equal in size. The interior walls are not painted, there is no gallery, and the ceiling is flat and painted blue. On each long side there are three large windows. The church remained unchanged until 1936, when the ceiling, mouldings, altar rail, and pulpit were given new colours. Angular braces, which supported the ceiling and the walls, were removed, and the church interior became more open. Behind the simple wooden cross on the altar a canopy with stars against a blue background was installed.

== See also ==
- List of churches in Bjørgvin
