= Nordfjord District Court =

Former district court in Norway

- Nordfjord tingrett
- 61°54′31″N 5°59′27″E
- Established: 1591
- Dissolved: 1 Jan 2005
- Jurisdiction: Nordfjord
- Location: Nordfjordeid, Norway
- Coordinates: 61°54′31″N 5°59′27″E
- Appeals to: Gulating Court of Appeal

Nordfjord District Court (Norwegian: Nordfjord tingrett) was a district court in Sogn og Fjordane county, Norway. The court was based in the village of Nordfjordeid. The court existed from 1591 until 2005. The court had jurisdiction over the municipalities located in the Nordfjord region. This included the municipalities of Selje, Vågsøy, Bremanger, Eid, Gloppen, Hornindal, and Stryn. Cases from this court could be appealed to Gulating Court of Appeal.

The court was a court of first instance. Its judicial duties were mainly to settle criminal cases and to resolve civil litigation as well as bankruptcy. The administration and registration tasks of the court included death registration, issuing certain certificates, performing duties of a notary public, and officiating civil wedding ceremonies. Cases from this court were heard by a combination of professional judges and lay judges.

== History ==
This court was established in 1591 when the district court system was implemented in Norway. On 1 January 2005, this court was merged with the Sunnfjord District Court and most of the western part of Ytre Sogn District Court to form the new Fjordane District Court.
