= Sogn District Court =

Former district court in Norway

- Sogn tingrett
- Interactive map of Sogn District Court
- 61.232166°N 7.103653°E
- Established: 1 Jan 2005
- Dissolved: 1 July 2017
- Jurisdiction: Sogn
- Location: Sogndalsfjøra, Norway
- Coordinates: 61.232166°N 7.103653°E
- Appeals to: Gulating Court of Appeal

Sogn District Court (Norwegian: Sogn tingrett) was a district court in Sogn og Fjordane county, Norway. The court was based in the village of Sogndalsfjøra. The court existed from 2005 until 2017. It had jurisdiction over the municipalities of Sogndal, Aurland, Balestrand, Leikanger, Luster, Lærdal, Vik, and Årdal. Cases from this court could be appealed to Gulating Court of Appeal.

The court was a court of first instance. Its judicial duties were mainly to settle criminal cases and to resolve civil litigation as well as bankruptcy. The administration and registration tasks of the court included death registration, issuing certain certificates, performing duties of a notary public, and officiating civil wedding ceremonies. Cases from this court were heard by a combination of professional judges and lay judges.

== History ==
The Sogn District Court was first established in 1591 when the district court system began in Norway. In 1630, it was divided into the Ytre Sogn District Court and Indre Sogn District Court. On 1 January 2005, the court was re-established upon the merger of the Indre Sogn District Court and the eastern part of the old Ytre Sogn District Court. On 1 July 2017, this court was merged with the Fjordane District Court to form the new Sogn og Fjordane District Court which covered the entire county except for Gulen Municipality.
