= Olve Grotle =

Norwegian politician (born 1964)

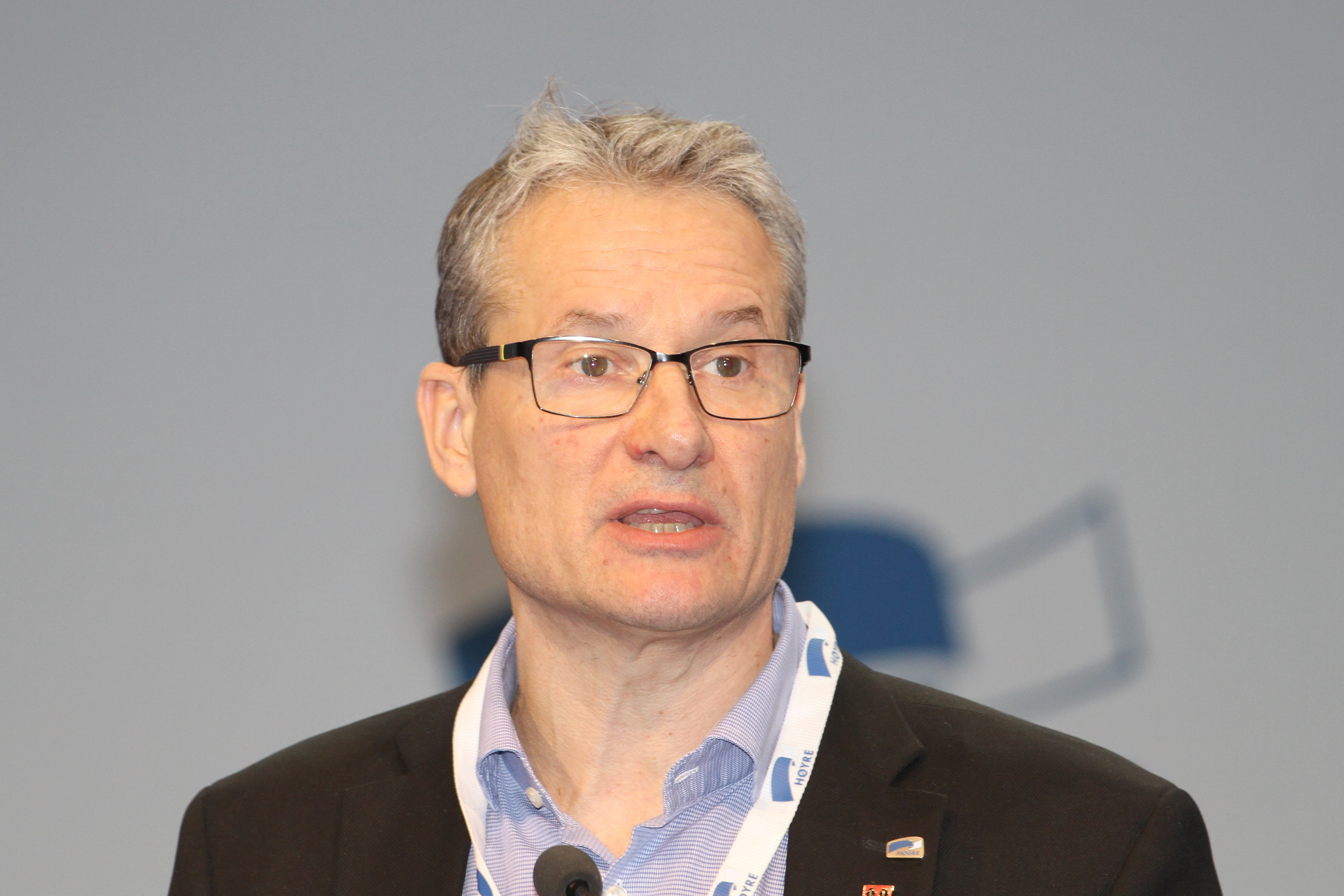
- Born: 17 February 1964 (age 62); Bremanger Municipality, Norway
- Education: University of Bergen
- Occupations: Barrister; Politician
- Political party: Conservative Party

Olve Grotle (born 17 February 1964) is a Norwegian politician for the Conservative Party. He is a former mayor of Førde Municipality and Sunnfjord Municipality and has been a member of the Storting since 2021.

== Biography ==
Grotle was born in Bremanger Municipality on 17 February 1964. After graduating in jurisprudence from the University of Bergen, he worked as a barrister from 1989 to 2011.

He served as mayor of Førde Municipality in 2011. He was the first mayor of the new Sunnfjord Municipality in 2020, after the merger between Førde, Naustdal, Jølster, and Gaular.

He was elected representative to the Storting from the constituency of Sogn og Fjordane for the period 2021–2025 for the Conservative Party. In the Storting, he is a member of the Standing Committee on Business and Industry for the period 2021 to 2025.
