= Indre Sogn District Court =

Former district court in Norway

- Indre Sogn tingrett
- 61°13′56″N 7°06′13″E
- Established: c. 1630
- Dissolved: 1 Jan 2005
- Jurisdiction: Inner Sogn
- Location: Sogndalsfjøra, Norway
- Coordinates: 61°13′56″N 7°06′13″E
- Appeals to: Gulating Court of Appeal

Indre Sogn District Court (Norwegian: Indre Sogn tingrett) was a district court in Sogn og Fjordane county, Norway. The court was based in the village of Sogndalsfjøra. The court existed from around 1630 until 2005. It had jurisdiction over the municipalities located in the areas surrounding the inner Sognefjorden. This included the municipalities of Sogndal, Aurland, Leikanger, Luster, Lærdal, and Årdal. Cases from this court could be appealed to Gulating Court of Appeal.

The court was a court of first instance. Its judicial duties were mainly to settle criminal cases and to resolve civil litigation as well as bankruptcy. The administration and registration tasks of the court included death registration, issuing certain certificates, performing duties of a notary public, and officiating civil wedding ceremonies. Cases from this court were heard by a combination of professional judges and lay judges.

== History ==
In 1591, the Sogn District Court was established when the district court system was implemented in Norway. Around 1630, the court's jurisdiction was split into Ytre Sogn District Court in the east and Indre Sogn District Court in the west. In 2005, the court's jurisdictional area was merged into the new Sogn District Court (along with Balestrand Municipality and Vik Municipality which were from the Ytre Sogn District Court which also closed).
