= Fjordane District Court =

District court in Førde, Norway

- Fjordane tingrett
- 61.4496827°N 5.858749°E
- Established: 1 Jan 2005
- Dissolved: 1 July 2017
- Jurisdiction: Sogn og Fjordane
- Location: Førde, Norway
- Coordinates: 61.4496827°N 5.858749°E
- Appeals to: Gulating Court of Appeal

Fjordane District Court (Norwegian: Fjordane tingrett) was a district court in Sogn og Fjordane county, Norway. The court was based in the town of Førde. The court existed from 2005 until 2017. It had jurisdiction over the municipalities of Førde, Askvoll, Bremanger, Eid, Fjaler, Flora, Gaular, Gloppen, Hornindal, Hyllestad, Høyanger, Jølster, Naustdal, Selje, Solund, Stryn and Vågsøy. Cases from this court could be appealed to Gulating Court of Appeal.

The court was a court of first instance. Its judicial duties were mainly to settle criminal cases and to resolve civil litigation as well as bankruptcy. The administration and registration tasks of the court included death registration, issuing certain certificates, performing duties of a notary public, and officiating civil wedding ceremonies. Cases from this court were heard by a combination of professional judges and lay judges.

== History ==
This court was established on 1 January 2005 upon the merger of the Nordfjord District Court, Sunnfjord District Court, and the western part of the Ytre Sogn District Court (except for Gulen Municipality). On 1 July 2017, this court was merged with the Sogn District Court to form the new Sogn og Fjordane District Court which covered the entire county except for Gulen Municipality.
