= Haukedalen Church =

Church in Vestland, Norway

- Haukedalen kyrkje
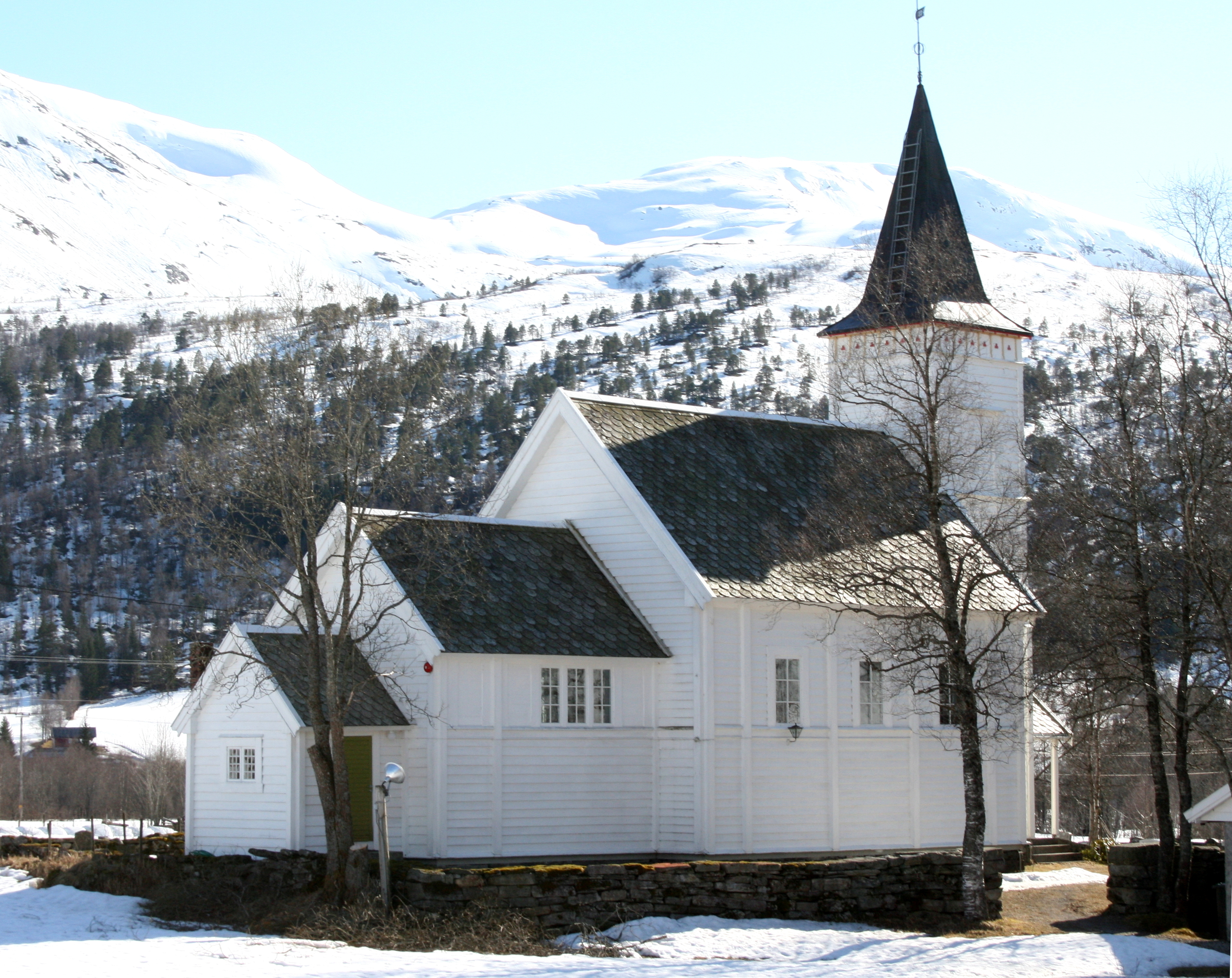
- View of the church
- Haukedalen Church
- 61°25′14″N 6°22′16″E
- Location: Sunnfjord Municipality, Vestland
- Country: Norway
- Denomination: Church of Norway
- Churchmanship: Evangelical Lutheran

History
- Former name: Haukedal Chapel
- Status: Parish church
- Founded: c. 1673
- Consecrated: 8 July 1885

Architecture
- Functional status: Active
- Architect: Hartvig Sverdrup Eckhoff
- Architectural type: Long church
- Completed: 1885 (141 years ago)

Specifications
- Capacity: 120
- Materials: Wood

Administration
- Diocese: Bjørgvin bispedømme
- Deanery: Sunnfjord prosti
- Parish: Holsen og Haukedalen
- Norwegian Cultural Heritage Site
- Type: Church
- Status: Not protected
- ID: 84506

Haukedalen Church (Norwegian: Haukedalen kyrkje) is a parish church of the Church of Norway in Sunnfjord Municipality in Vestland county, Norway. It is located in the village of Haukedalen. It one of the two churches for the Holsen og Haukedalen parish which is part of the Sunnfjord prosti (deanery) in the Diocese of Bjørgvin. The white, wooden church was built in a long church style in 1885 using designs by the architect Hartvig Sverdrup Eckhoff. The church seats about 120 people.

Haukedalen Church is located at an elevation of 300 metres (980 ft) above sea level, and within the old Sogn og Fjordane county, only Borgund Stave Church and Borgund Church in Lærdal Municipality are higher in elevation. Haukedalen is also the church located farthest from the sea in all of Sogn og Fjordane county, 42 kilometres (26 mi) from the head of the Førdefjorden. The community of Haukedalen is on the high ground of the Gaula river watershed. The Haukedalen people have always belonged to the parish of Førde, even though they had to cross the 543-metre (1,781 ft) high Rørvikfjellet pass in the Gaularfjellet mountains to reach the Holsen Church (until Haukedalen received its own church). Haukedalen is in the geographical centre of the old county of Sogn og Fjordane and is thus both distant and central in location.

== History ==
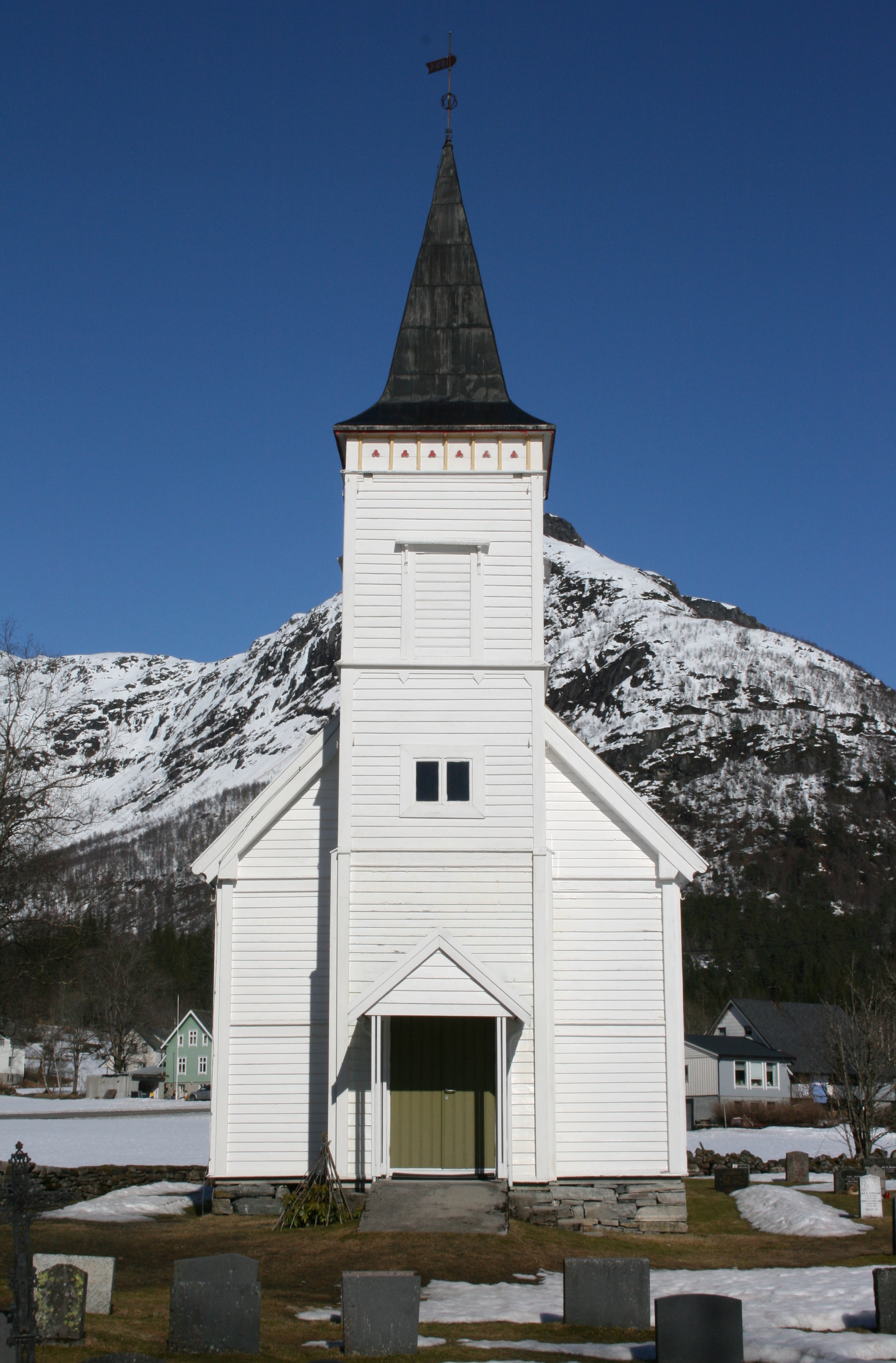
View of the front exterior

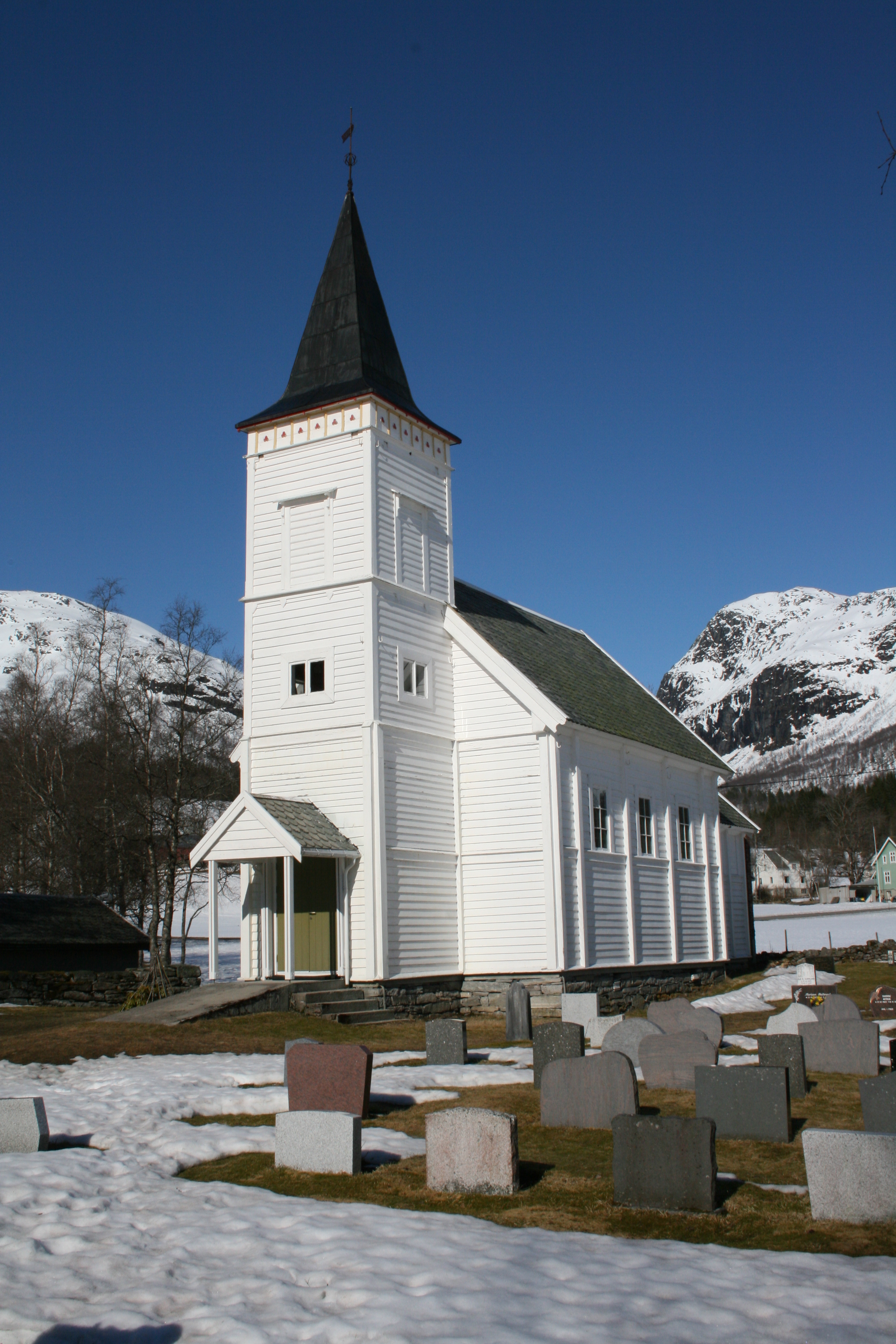
View of the side exterior

The earliest existing historical records of the church date back to the year 1699, but the church was not new that year. At that time, it was called a "chapel" and it fell under the control of Holsen Church, about 15 kilometres (9.3 mi) to the west in the next valley. The residents of Haukedalen had been asking for their own church for a long time. It is possible that there was a medieval church located here that at some point was torn down, but there are no surviving records to support that. The altarpiece in the church is dated to 1673, so that may be the year the church was established.

Historically, the residents of the Haukedalen valley were part of the Holsen Church parish, located in the next valley over. However, large quantities of snow have stopped a good many church travelers from crossing the mountain pass between Holsen and Haukedalen. There is a place called Likhillaren where people used to leave coffins if darkness or bad weather set in while they were on their way to Holsen Church. Towards the end of the 17th century (likely in 1673), the residents of Haukedalen at long last got their own church. It was built close to the lake Haukedalsvatnet. The church was not large. The nave measured about 7 metres (23 ft) long and it was rectangular in shape. The choir was rectangular as well and it was narrower than the nave.

Prior to 1859, the vicar for the Førde parish came to Haukedalen only twice a year, around midsummer and on Michaelmas (29 September). Funerals were taken care of by the people in the village. It was practice to "sing out" the dead body at the home, then the coffin was buried at the churchyard. The church rituals had to wait until the next church service. The midsummer mass tradition is special, and it is something Haukedalen shares with other hill valleys, such as at Guddal. The midsummer mass is even today a day of celebration for people in the community.

In 1884, the old chapel was torn down and replaced on the same site with a new building. The new building was designed by Hartvig Sverdrup Eckhoff and built by builder Gjert Lien from Nordfjordeid. The new church was consecrated on 8 July 1885 by the local Provost Christopher Johannes Hammer. The new church held the status of a church (rather than a chapel). Since that time, Haukedalen has had a worship service about once a month.

== Building ==
The Haukedalen church of today was built in 1884 and consecrated the year after, the same year in which the Førde Church was finished. As was the case with the old church, the people in the valley covered all the expenses, which amounted to 5765.06 kr. It is a basilica church in timber framework, painted white, with the steeple above the porch to the west. The nave is 9.5 by 7 metres (31 by 23 ft), the chancel is 5.5 by 4.5 metres (18 by 15 ft). A vestry was built to the east in the 1950s. Also at that time, the church was also insulated, electric lighting and heating were installed, and the interior was renovated with new paneling and new seats. Historically, people sat in the church according to their rank, with the people from the largest farms on the front benches and the smaller farms in the back, but this was changed for the 75-year anniversary in 1960.

== See also ==
- List of churches in Bjørgvin
