= Grovabreen =

Glacier in Sunnfjord, Norway

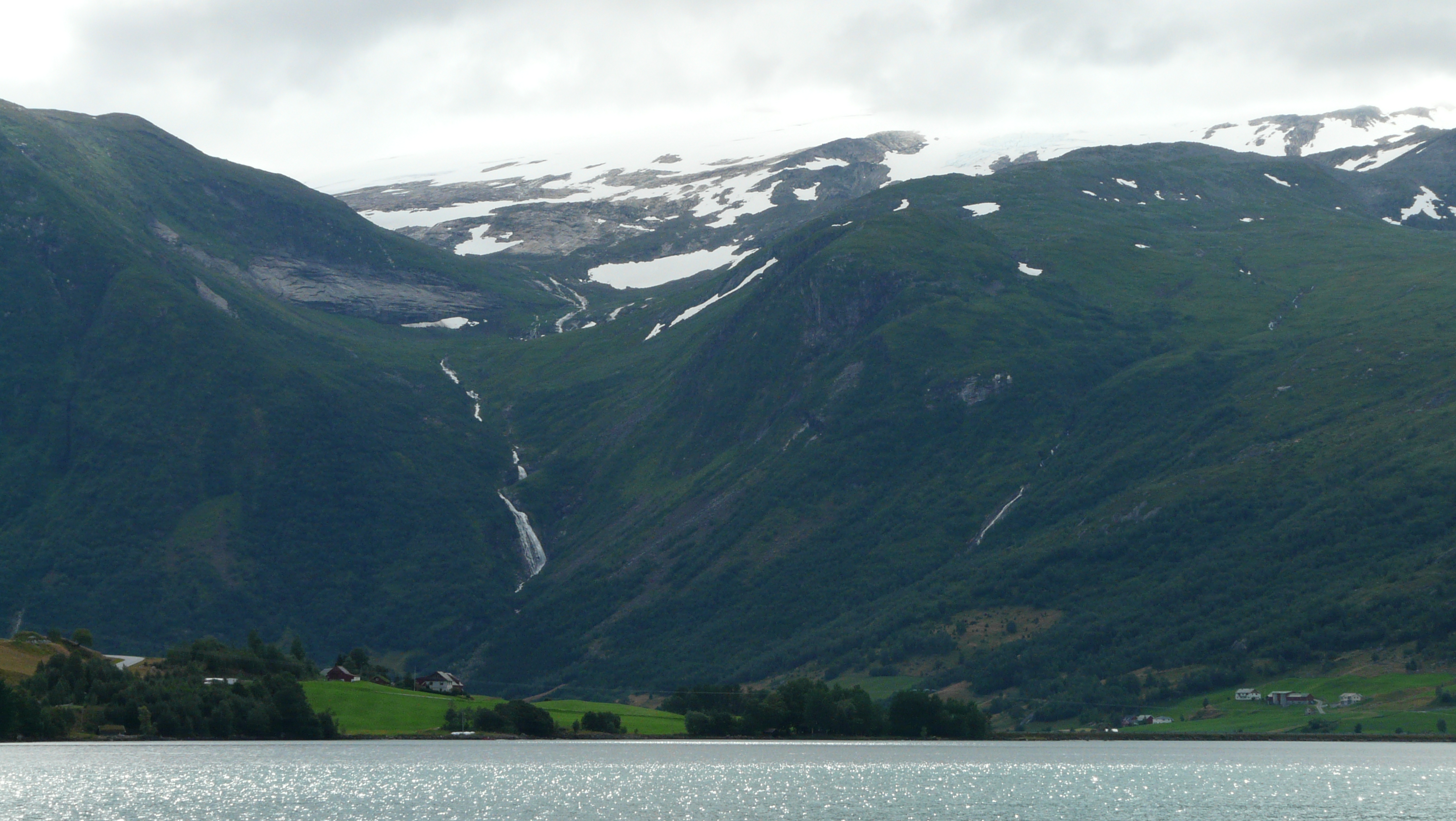
- Looking south at the Grovabreen from the lake Jølstravatnet
- Interactive map of Grovabreen
- Location: Vestland, Norway
- Coordinates: 61.48587°N 6.51513°E
- Area: 20 km^{2} (7.7 sq mi)

Grovabreen is a glacier is located in Vestland county, Norway. It covers an area of about 20 square kilometres (7.7 sq mi) in Sunnfjord Municipality in the Sunnfjord region. The highest point on the glacier sits at an elevation of 1,636 metres (5,367 ft) above sea level. The glacier is part of Jostedalsbreen National Park, just south of the lake Jølstravatnet. The village of Skei lies about 8 kilometres (5.0 mi) north of the glacier and the village of Haukedalen lies about 9 kilometres (5.6 mi) southwest of the glacier. The Jostefonn glacier lies about 5 kilometres (3.1 mi) to the south of this glacier; both are located at the north end of the Gaularfjellet mountains.

== See also ==
- List of glaciers in Norway
