= Sogn og Fjordane District Court =

First-instance law court in Norway

- Sogn og Fjordane tingrett
- Interactive map of Sogn og Fjordane; District Court
- 61°26′59″N 5°51′31″E
- Established: 1 July 2017
- Jurisdiction: Sogn, Sunnfjord, & Nordfjord, Norway
- Location: Førde and Sogndalsfjøra
- Coordinates: 61°26′59″N 5°51′31″E
- Appeals to: Gulating Court of Appeal
- Website: Official website

Chief Judge (Sørenskriver)
- Currently: Terje Mowatt

Sogn og Fjordane District Court (Norwegian: Sogn og Fjordane tingrett) is a district court located in Vestland county, Norway. This court is based at two different courthouses which are located in Førde and Sogndalsfjøra. There is also a courthouse in Nordfjordeid, however, this courthouse is not staffed, but it can be used by the court if needed. The court is subordinate to the Gulating Court of Appeal. The court serves the northern part of the county which includes 18 municipalities.

- The courthouse in Førde accepts cases from the municipalities of Askvoll, Bremanger, Fjaler, Gloppen, Gulen, Hyllestad, Høyanger, Kinn, Solund, Stad, Stryn, and Sunnfjord.
- The courthouse in Sogndalsfjøra accepts cases from the municipalities of Aurland, Luster, Lærdal, Sogndal, Vik, and Årdal.

The court is led by the chief judge (Sorenskriver) Terje Mowatt. This court employs a chief judge, eight other judges, and eleven prosecutors. The court is a court of first instance. Its judicial duties are mainly to settle criminal cases and to resolve civil litigation as well as bankruptcy. The administration and registration tasks of the court include death registration, issuing certain certificates, performing duties of a notary public, and officiating civil wedding ceremonies. Cases from this court are heard by a combination of professional judges and lay judges.

== History ==
This court was established on 1 July 2017 after the old Sogn District Court and Fjordane District Court were merged into one court. The new district court system continues to use the courthouses from the predecessor courts.
