= Førde Church =

Church in Vestland, Norway

- Førde kyrkje
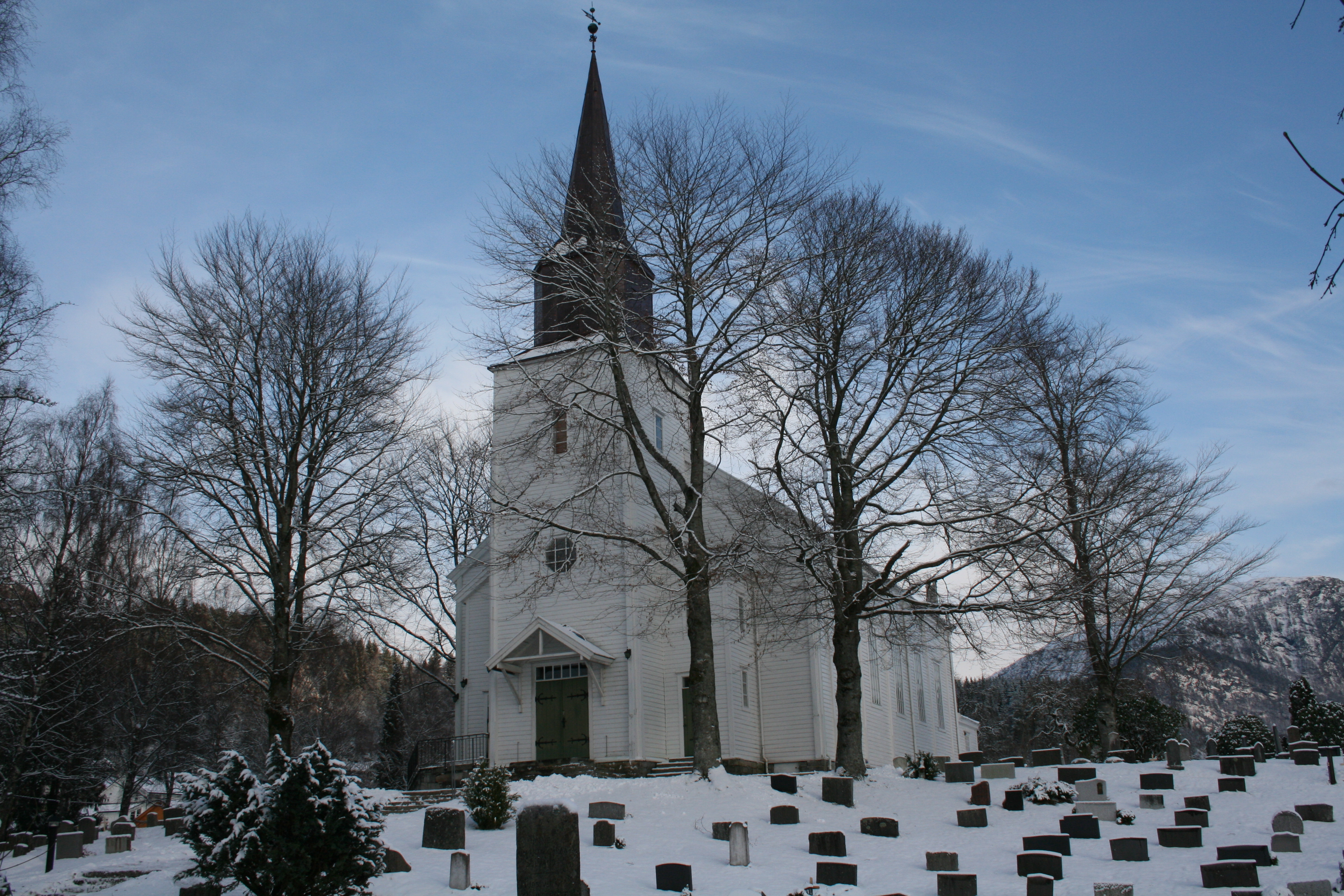
- View of the church
- Førde Church
- 61°27′21″N 5°51′46″E
- Location: Sunnfjord Municipality, Vestland
- Country: Norway
- Denomination: Church of Norway
- Churchmanship: Evangelical Lutheran

History
- Status: Parish church
- Founded: 13th century
- Consecrated: 1 Oct 1885

Architecture
- Functional status: Active
- Architect: Jacob Wilhelm Nordan
- Architectural type: Long church
- Completed: 1885 (141 years ago)

Specifications
- Capacity: 475
- Materials: Wood

Administration
- Diocese: Bjørgvin bispedømme
- Deanery: Sunnfjord prosti
- Parish: Førde
- Norwegian Cultural Heritage Site
- Type: Church
- Status: Listed
- ID: 84222

Førde Church (Norwegian: Førde kyrkje) is a parish church of the Church of Norway in Sunnfjord Municipality in Vestland county, Norway. It is located in the town of Førde. It is the church for the Førde parish which is part of the Sunnfjord prosti (deanery) in the Diocese of Bjørgvin. The white, wooden church was built in a long church design in 1885 using plans drawn up by the architect Jacob Wilhelm Nordan. The church seats about 475 people.

== Building ==
Førde Church sits on a small hill overlooking the river Jølstra. The river was originally about 150 metres (490 ft) to the west, but in the spring of 1780 during an ice storm, the river broke through its shores and changed its course. Since then, the river has flowed almost 1 kilometre (0.62 mi) to the west instead. The church is 38.7 metres (127 ft) long, the nave measuring 24.4 metres (80 ft), and 15.5 metres (51 ft) wide. To the east, there is a pentagonal chancel with vestries on each side. The porch to the west is a quadrangle that is 5.5 by 5.5 metres (18 by 18 ft), and it has a base for a 30-metre (98 ft) high steeple. The church has a large gallery, where an organ was installed when the church was new.

== History ==
The earliest existing historical records of the church date back to the year 1327, but the church was not new at that time. The first church in Førde was likely a wooden stave church. Around 1620–1625, a new timber-framed nave was built adjacent to the old church and the existing medieval church was converted into the new chancel for the newly enlarged building.

In 1814, this church served as an election church (Norwegian: valgkirke). Together with more than 300 other parish churches across Norway, it was a polling station for elections to the 1814 Norwegian Constituent Assembly which wrote the Constitution of Norway. This was Norway's first national elections. Each church parish was a constituency that elected people called "electors" who later met together in each county to elect the representatives for the assembly that was to meet at Eidsvoll Manor later that year.

In 1838, the church was torn down and replaced by a small timber-framed long church. In 1885, the church was torn down and a new wooden long church was built on the same site. It was designed by Jacob Wilhelm Nordan and the lead builder was Iver Løtvedt. The new church was consecrated on 1 October 1885 by the Bishop Fredrik Waldemar Hvoslef. In 1941–1951, the church was significantly renovated according to plans by Finn Bryn. During this renovation, the interior ceiling was rebuilt as flat instead of vaulted. The windows were replaced, the tower was rebuilt, and a new electrical lighting system was installed. In 1970 the sacristy was rebuilt and running water was installed. A new bathroom facility was built in 1975. A wheelchair entrance was built in 1983 and the church porch was renovated in 1985.

== Media gallery ==
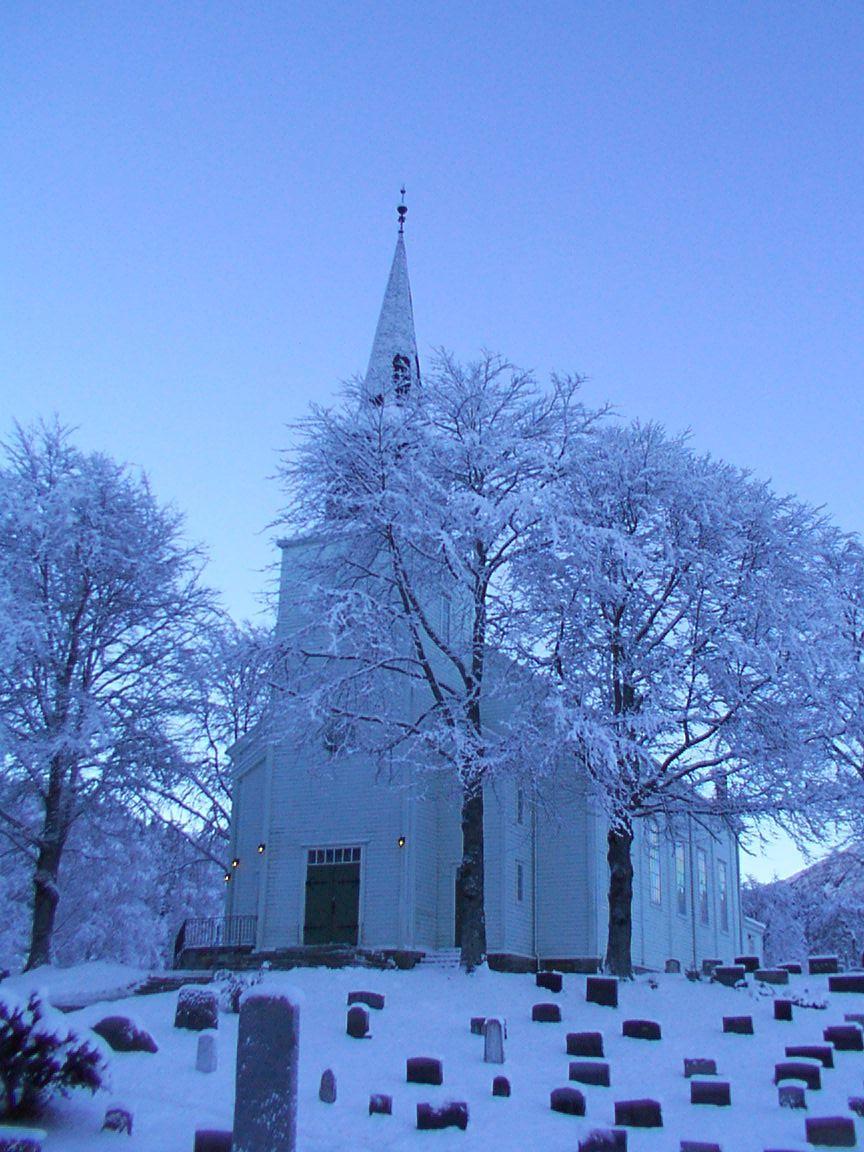

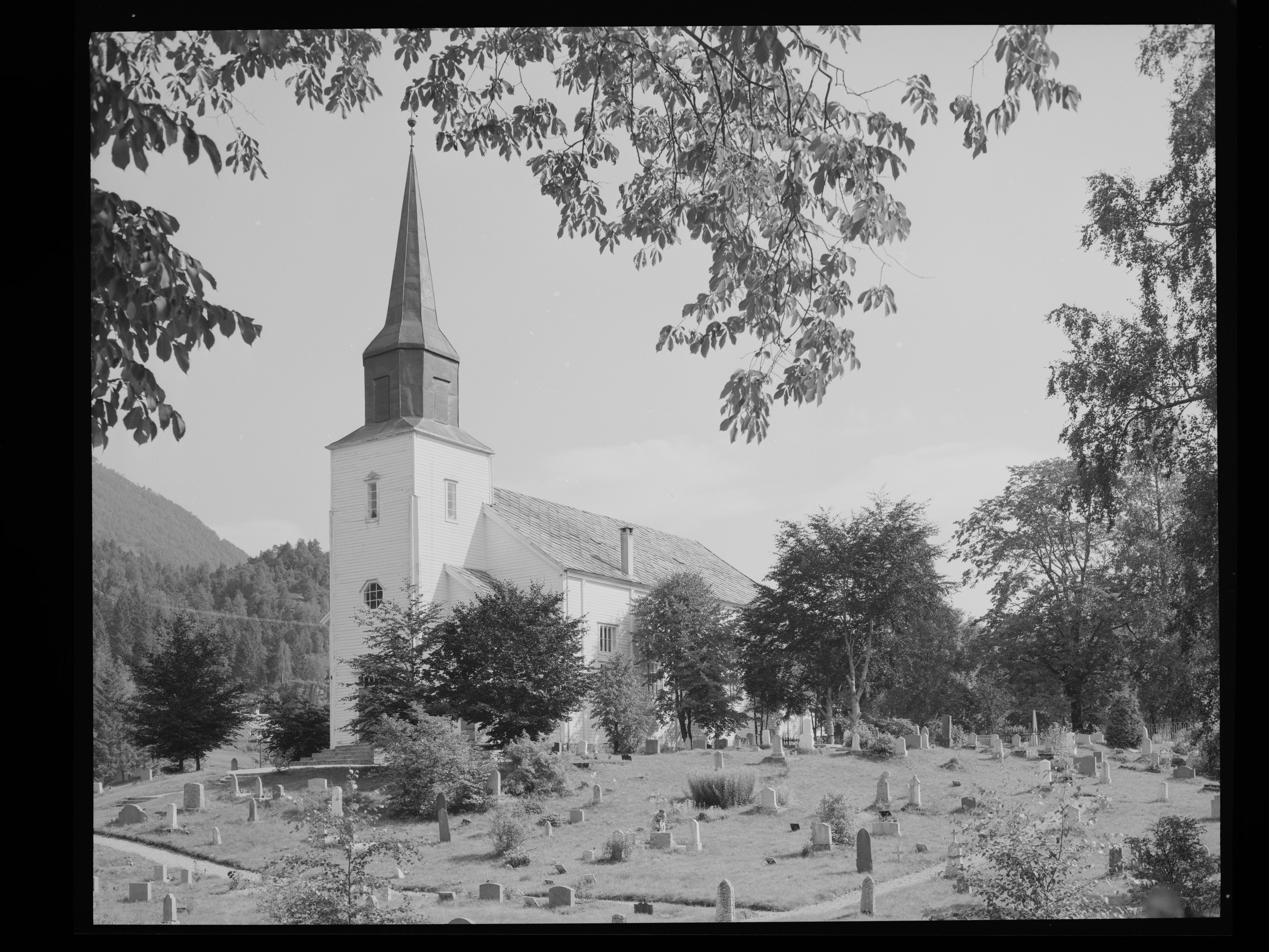

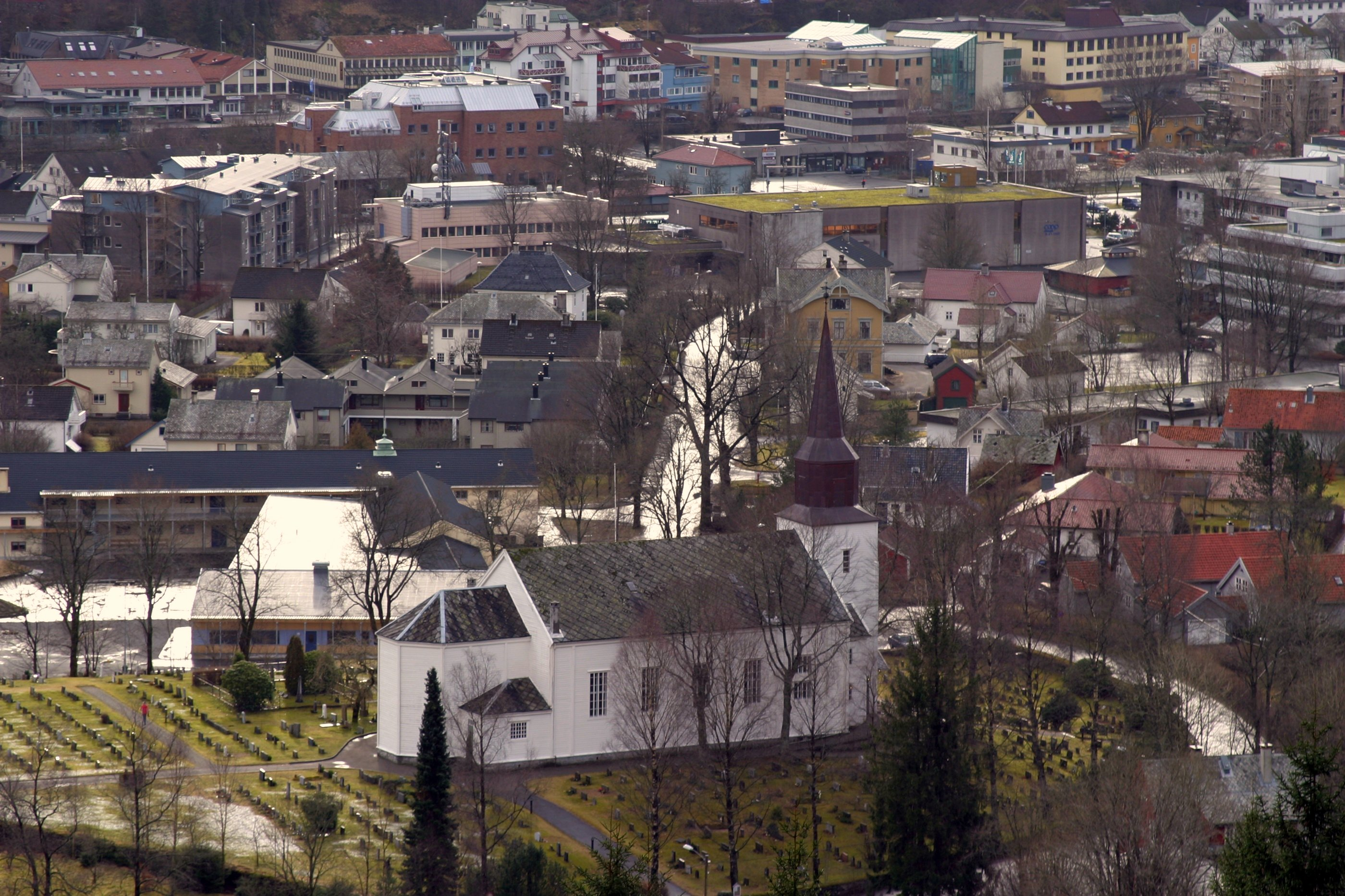

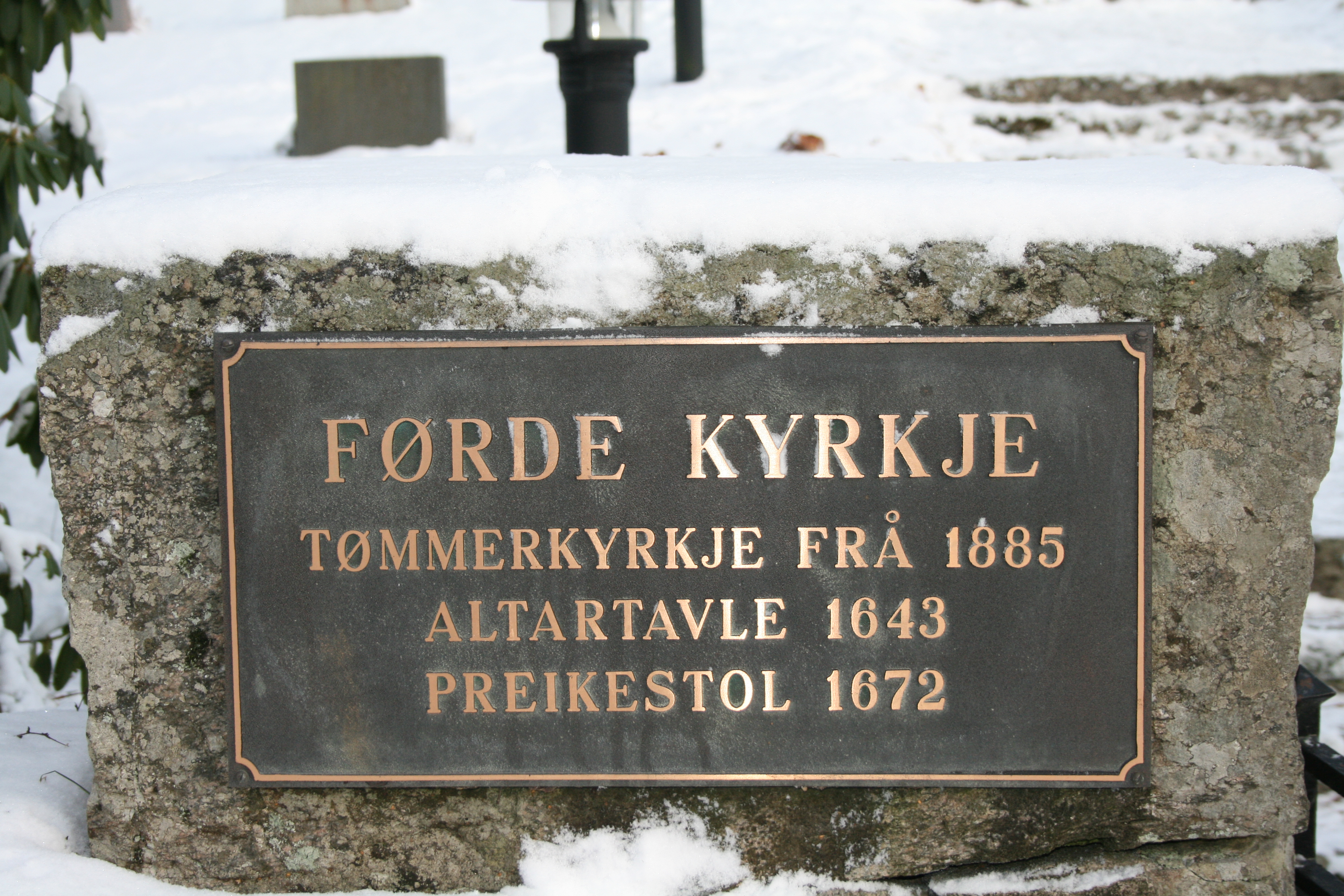

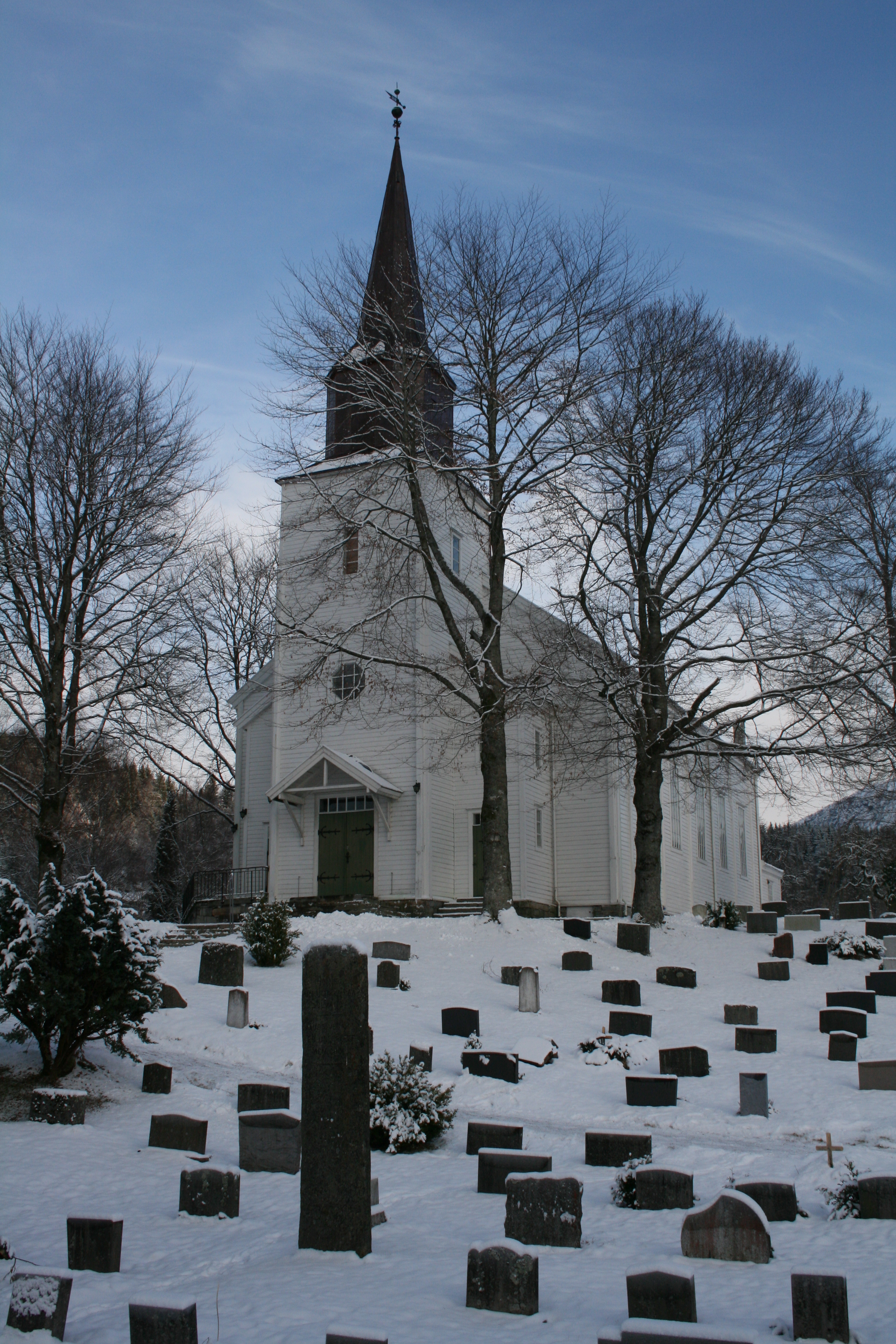

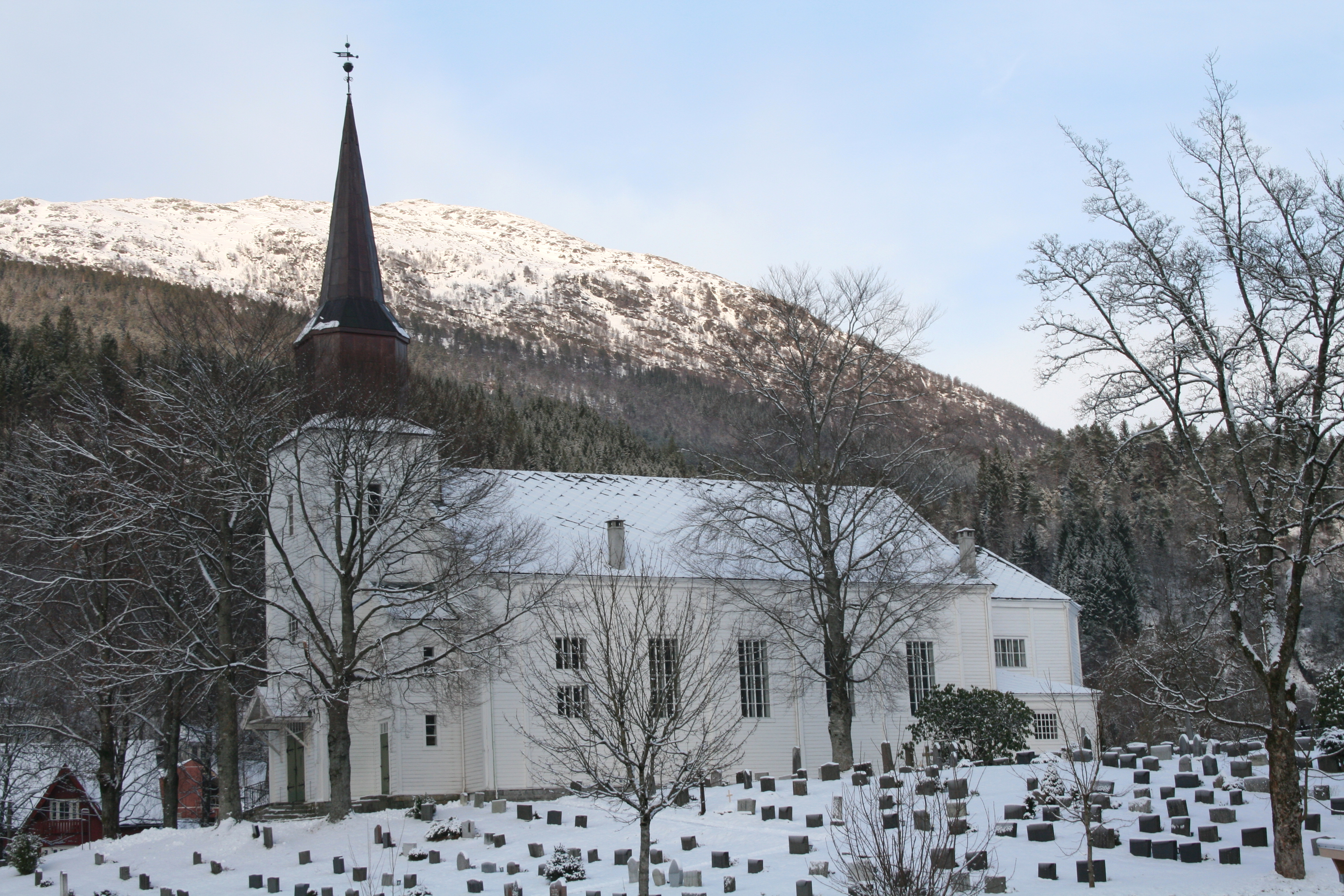

== See also ==
- List of churches in Bjørgvin
