= Jostefonni =

Glacier in Vestland, Norway

- Interactive map of the glacier
- Location: Vestland, Norway
- Coordinates: 61.42806°N 6.58027°E
- Area: 11 km^{2} (4.2 sq mi)

Jostefonni is a glacier is located in Vestland county, Norway. It covers an area of around 11 square kilometres (4.2 sq mi) in Sunnfjord Municipality and Sogndal Municipality. Jostefonni was formerly a part of the large Jostedalsbreen glacier, but it is no longer connected to the main glacier. It sits inside the Jostedalsbreen National Park, about 10 kilometres (6.2 mi) east of the village of Haukedalen and about 7 kilometres (4.3 mi) northwest of the village of Fjærland. The Grovabreen glacier lies about 5 kilometres (3.1 mi) north of this glacier.

== See also ==
- List of glaciers in Norway
