= Holsen =

Village in Sunnfjord Municipality, Norway

- Village
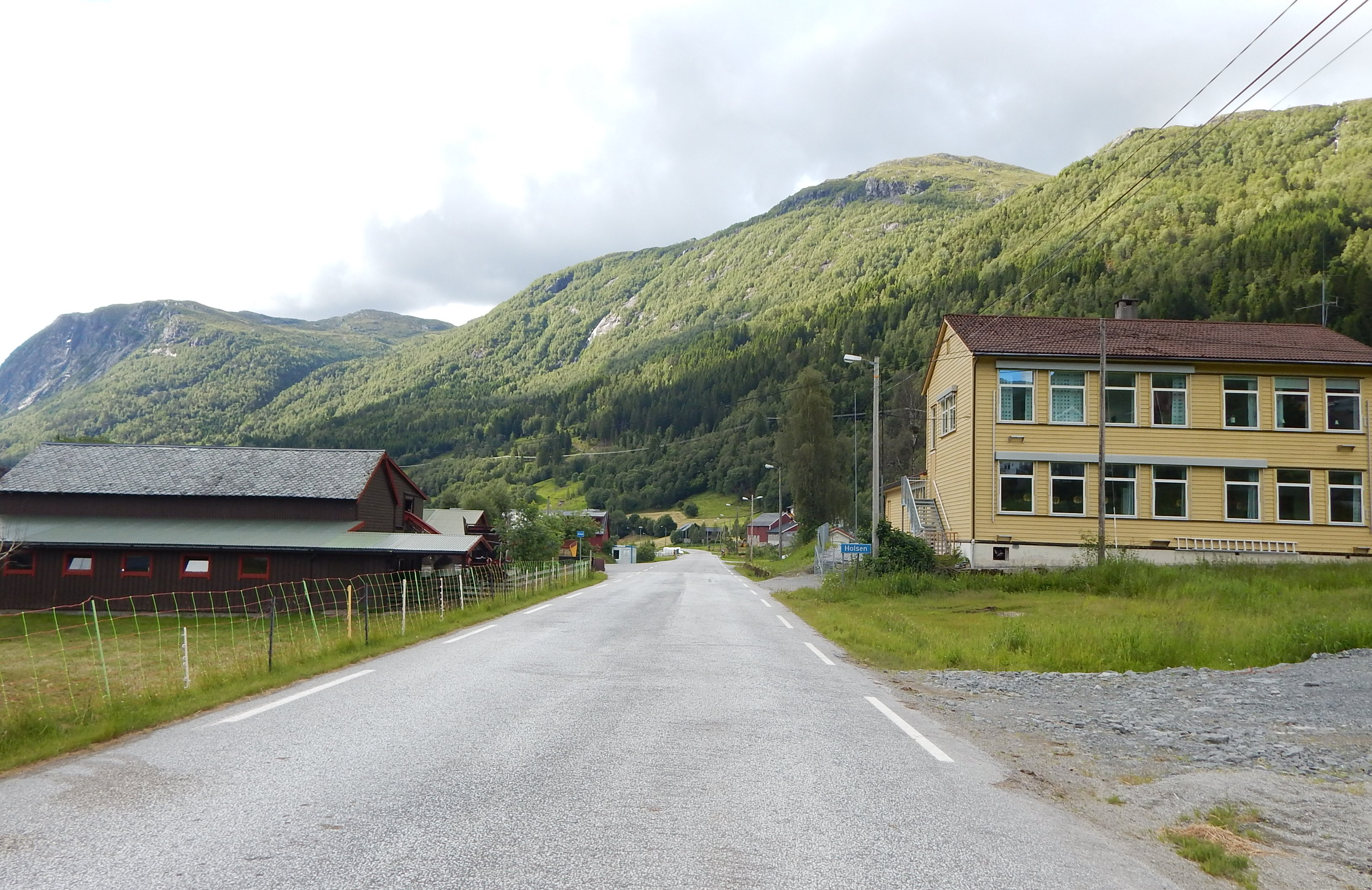
- View of the village
- Interactive map of Holsen
- Location within Vestland Location within Norway
- Coordinates: 61.4181°N 6.15876°E
- Country: Norway
- Region: Western Norway
- County: Vestland
- District: Sunnfjord
- Municipality: Sunnfjord Municipality
- Elevation: 150 m (490 ft)
- Time zone: UTC+01:00 (CET)
  - Summer (DST): UTC+02:00 (CEST)
- Post Code: 6819 Førde

Holsen is a village in Sunnfjord Municipality in Vestland county, Norway. The village is located at the eastern end of the lake Holsavatnet, along County Road 13. The town of Førde lies about 20 kilometres (12 mi) to the west, and the village of Haukedalen lies about 12 kilometres (7.5 mi) to the east. Holsen is the site of Holsen Church and Holsen school.
