= Bruland =

- Village
- Interactive map of Bruland
- Location within Vestland Location within Norway
- Coordinates: 61.43823°N 5.89665°E
- Country: Norway
- Region: Western Norway
- County: Vestland
- District: Sunnfjord
- Municipality: Sunnfjord Municipality
- Elevation: 29 m (95 ft)

Population (2001)
  - Total: 212
- Time zone: UTC+01:00 (CET)
  - Summer (DST): UTC+02:00 (CEST)
- Post Code: 6800 Førde

Bruland is a farming village in Sunnfjord Municipality in Vestland county, Norway. The village is located about 3.5 kilometres (2.2 mi) east of the town of Førde. The population (2001) of Bruland was 212.

It is located on the south bank of the river Jølstra, along the European route E39 highway. The lake Holsavatnet is located about 10 kilometres (6.2 mi) east of Bruland and the small Moskog area lies at the western end of that island. The name of the hamlet, Bruland literally means 'land of bridges'. Historically, many of the people who worked on the local farm took the surname Bruland.

Bruland was the home of the bailiff or fogd for the whole Sunnfjord region from 1567 until the end of the nineteenth century. One of the farm buildings at Bruland was moved there from the island of Svanøya (which is now part of Kinn Municipality) in 1789. Many of the old buildings have been restored and are now protected.

== Notable people ==
- Dagny Juel (1867–1901)
