= Holsavatnet =

Lake in Vestland, Norway

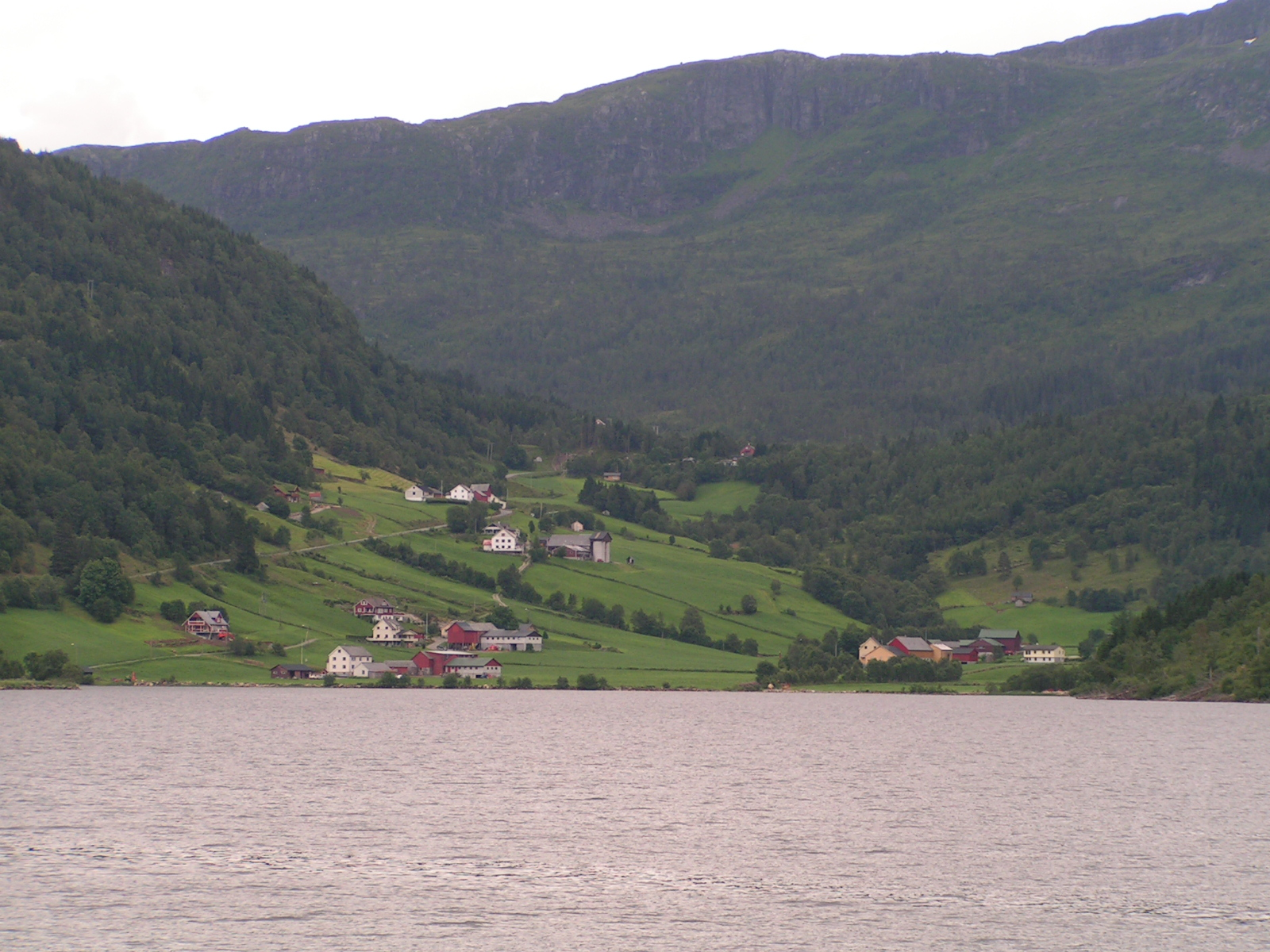
- View of the lake, seen from Nydalen
- Interactive map of the lake
- Location: Sunnfjord Municipality, Vestland
- Coordinates: 61.42118°N 6.09649°E
- Primary inflows: Skorpaelva river and Nyddalselva river
- Primary outflows: Lake Åsvatnet
- Basin countries: Norway
- Max. length: 6.7 kilometres (4.2 mi)
- Max. width: 1 kilometre (0.62 mi)
- Surface area: 3.33 km^{2} (1.29 sq mi)
- Shore length^{1}: 16.78 kilometres (10.43 mi)
- Surface elevation: 131 metres (430 ft)
- References: NVE
- ^{1} Shore length is not a well-defined measure.

Holsavatnet is a lake which lies in Sunnfjord Municipality in Vestland county, Norway. The lake is located about 12 kilometres (7.5 mi) east of the town of Førde and about 9.5 kilometres (5.9 mi) east of the village of Bruland. The village of Holsen lies at the eastern end of the lake. The European route E39 highway passes 3 kilometres (1.9 mi) west of the lake. The water from the lake eventually flows into the river Jølstra.

== See also ==
- List of lakes in Norway
