= Ytre Sogn District Court =

Former district court in Norway

- Ytre Sogn tingrett
- 61°13′36″N 6°04′20″E
- Established: c. 1630
- Dissolved: 1 Jan 2005
- Jurisdiction: Outer Sogn
- Location: Høyanger, Norway
- Coordinates: 61°13′36″N 6°04′20″E
- Appeals to: Gulating Court of Appeal

Ytre Sogn District Court (Norwegian: Ytre Sogn tingrett) was a district court in Sogn og Fjordane county, Norway, based in the village of Høyanger. It existed from around 1630 until 2005. It had jurisdiction over the municipalities located in the areas surrounding the outer Sognefjorden. This included the municipalities of Gulen, Solund, Hyllestad, Høyanger, Balestrand, and Vik. Cases could be appealed to Gulating Court of Appeal.

The court was a court of first instance. Its judicial duties were mainly to settle criminal cases and to resolve civil litigation as well as bankruptcy. The administration and registration tasks of the court included death registration, issuing certain certificates, performing duties of a notary public, and officiating civil wedding ceremonies. Cases from this court were heard by a combination of professional judges and lay judges.

== History ==
In 1591, the Sogn District Court was established when the district court system was implemented in Norway. Around 1630, is jurisdiction was split into Indre Sogn District Court in the east and Ytre Sogn District Court in the west. In 2005, it was closed and its jurisdictional areas were split up among other neighboring courts. The municipalities of Solund, Hyllestad, and Høyanger joined the newly created Fjordane District Court to the north. The municipalities of Balestrand and Vik merged with the Indre Sogn District Court to form the new Sogn District Court. The municipality of Gulen joined the Nordhordland District Court which was based in the neighboring Hordaland county to the south.
