= Haukedalen =

Village in Sunnfjord Municipality, Norway

- Village
- Interactive map of Haukedalen
- Location within Vestland Location within Norway
- Coordinates: 61.42105°N 6.37387°E
- Country: Norway
- Region: Western Norway
- County: Vestland
- District: Sunnfjord
- Municipality: Sunnfjord Municipality
- Elevation: 312 m (1,024 ft)
- Time zone: UTC+01:00 (CET)
  - Summer (DST): UTC+02:00 (CEST)
- Post Code: 6818 Haukedalen

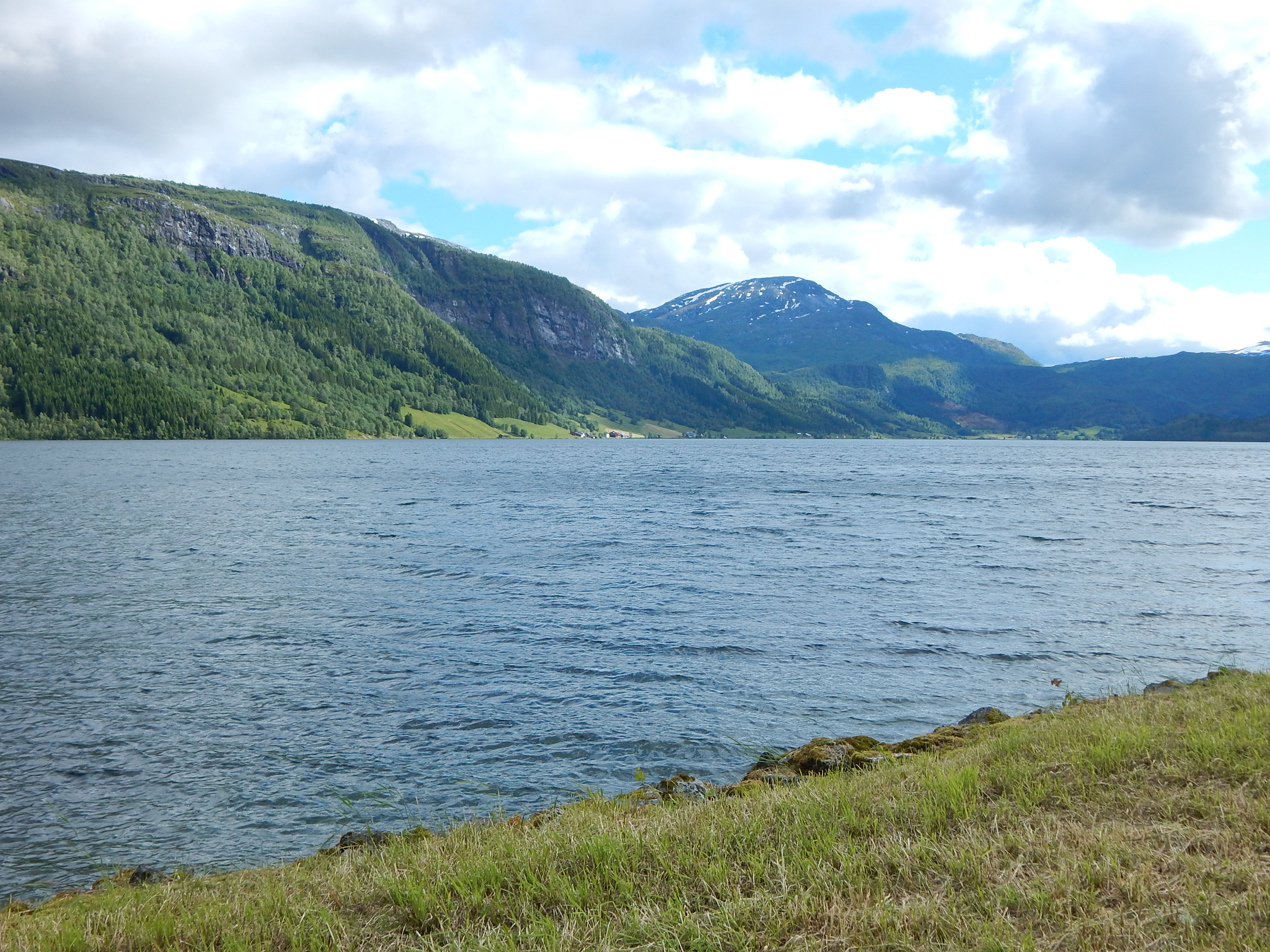
Lake Haukedalsvatnet

Haukedalen is a village in Sunnfjord Municipality in Vestland county, Norway. The village is located in the Haukedalen valley at the northwestern end of the lake Haukedalsvatnet. The village lies in a fairly remote valley surrounded by the Gaularfjellet mountains. The town of Førde lies about 35 kilometres (22 mi) to the west. Haukedalen Church is located in the village. The glaciers Grovabreen and Jostefonni are both about 10 kilometres (6.2 mi) to the northeast and east respectively.
