= Balestrand Municipality =

Former municipality in Sogn og Fjordane, Norway

Balestrand Municipality Balestrand kommune
- Former municipality
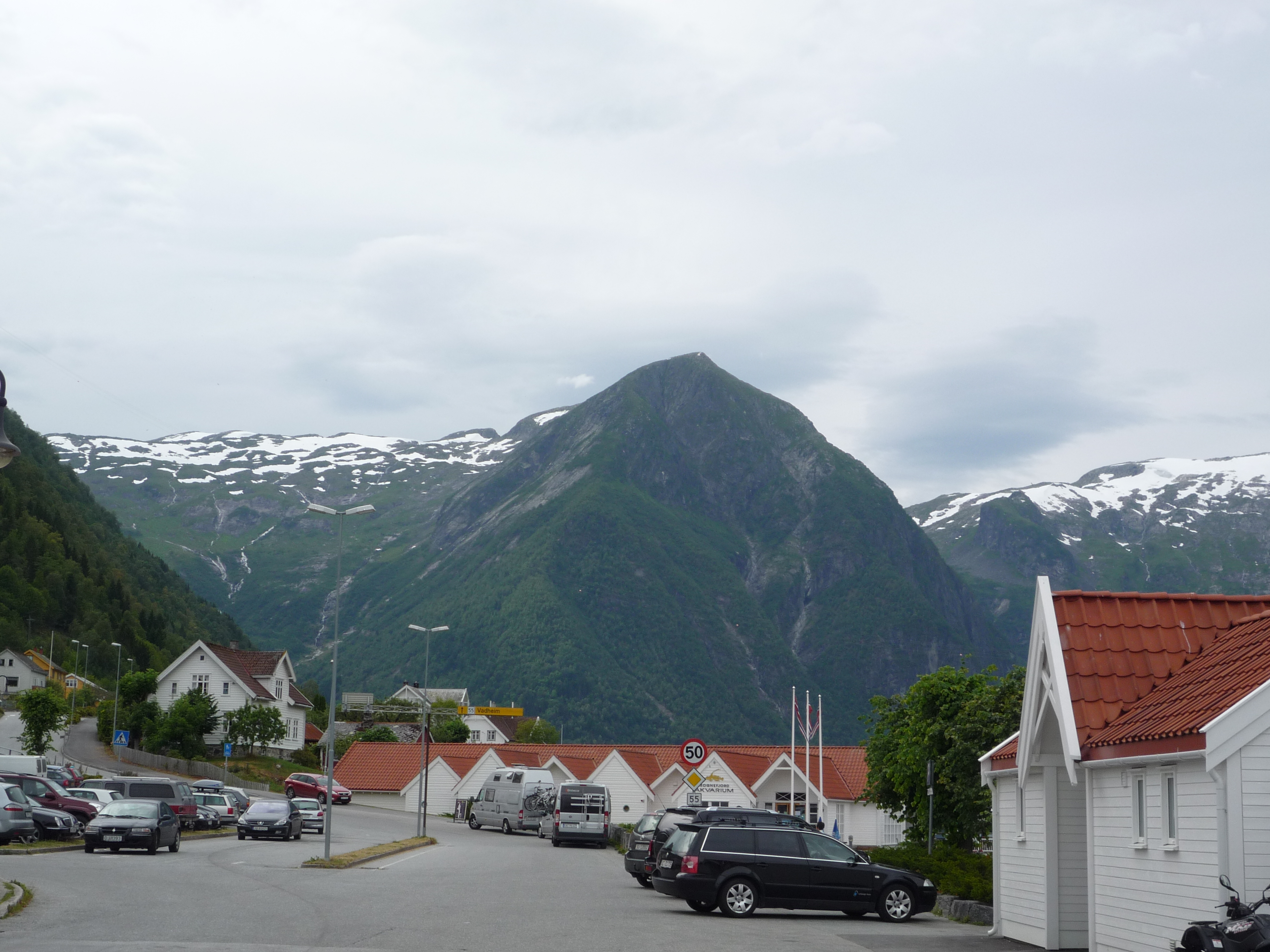
- View of Balestrand

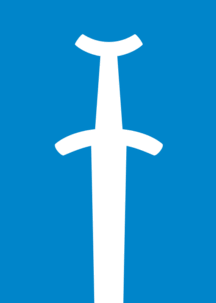
- Flag Coat of arms

- Sogn og Fjordane within Norway

- Balestrand within Sogn og Fjordane
- Coordinates: 61°10′39″N 06°24′14″E
- Country: Norway
- County: Sogn og Fjordane
- District: Sogn
- Established: 1850
  - Preceded by: Leikanger Municipality
- Disestablished: 1 Jan 2020
  - Succeeded by: Sogndal and Høyanger
- Administrative centre: Balestrand

Government
  - Mayor (2011–2019): Harald Offerdal (Ap)

Area (upon dissolution)
  - Total: 429.14 km^{2} (165.69 sq mi)
  - Land: 410.51 km^{2} (158.50 sq mi)
  - Water: 18.63 km^{2} (7.19 sq mi) 4.3%
  - Rank: #231 in Norway
- Highest elevation: 1,615 m (5,299 ft)

Population (2019)
  - Total: 1,279
  - Rank: #370 in Norway
  - Density: 3/km^{2} (7.8/sq mi)
  - Change (10 years): ▼ −5.1%
- Demonym: Balestrending

Official language
  - Norwegian form: Nynorsk
- Time zone: UTC+01:00 (CET)
  - Summer (DST): UTC+02:00 (CEST)
- ISO 3166 code: NO-1418

Balestrand is a former municipality in the old Sogn og Fjordane county, Norway. The 429-square-kilometre (166 sq mi) municipality existed from 1850 until its dissolution in 2020. The area is now part of Sogndal Municipality in the traditional district of Sogn in Vestland county. The administrative centre was the village of Balestrand. Other villages in the municipality included Ese, Kvamme, Låne, Sæle, Dragsviki, and Vetlefjorden.

The municipality was situated at the confluence of the Fjærlandsfjorden/Esefjorden and the main Sognefjorden. The major industries in the municipality were tourism and farming. Balestrand Municipality became popular early due to the interest of artists, such as Hans Gude, Kjartan Lauritzen, Alfred Heaton Cooper, Hans Dahl, and Johannes Flintoe. Their paintings of the scenery around Balestrand inspired visitors, and Balestrand maintains its connection with art. Other industries include made-to-order kitchen interiors, local apple juice, and Nesseplast which produces industrial plastic. The Norwegian National Road 13 ran through the municipality.

At the time of its dissolution in 2020, the 429.14-square-kilometre (165.69 sq mi) municipality was the 231st largest by area out of the 422 municipalities in Norway. Balestrand Municipality was the 370th most populous municipality in Norway with a population of 1,279. The municipality's population density was 3 inhabitants per square kilometre (7.8/sq mi) and its population had decreased by 5.1% over the previous decade.

In 2016, the chief of police for Vestlandet formally suggested a reconfiguration of police districts and stations. He proposed that the police station in Balestrand be closed.

== General information ==
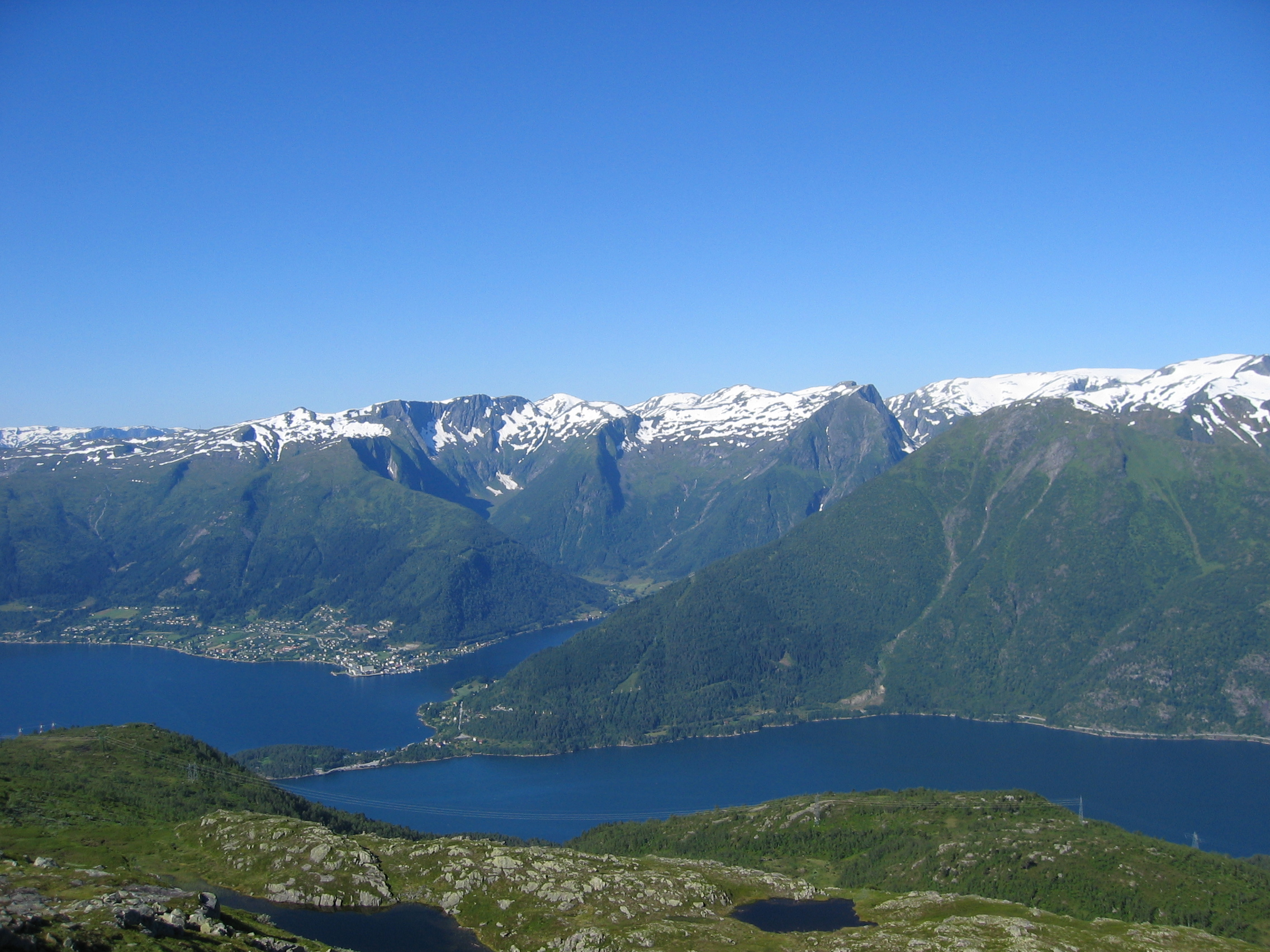
View of Balestrand village (left), the Esefjorden (center), and the Fjærlandsfjorden (right)

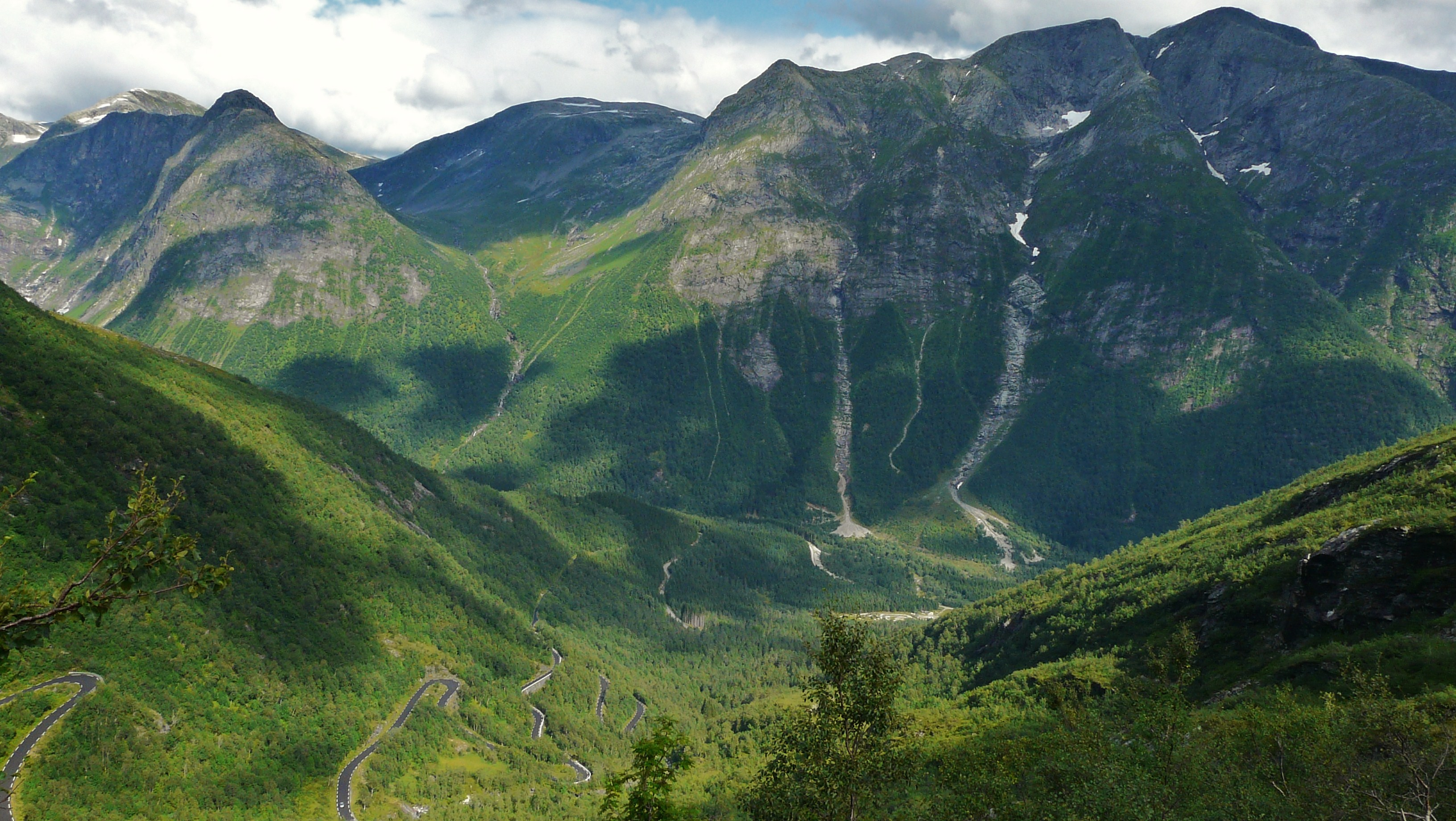
A view to Vetlefjorddalen and Bårddalen from a lookout spot at the top of the serpentine County Road 13

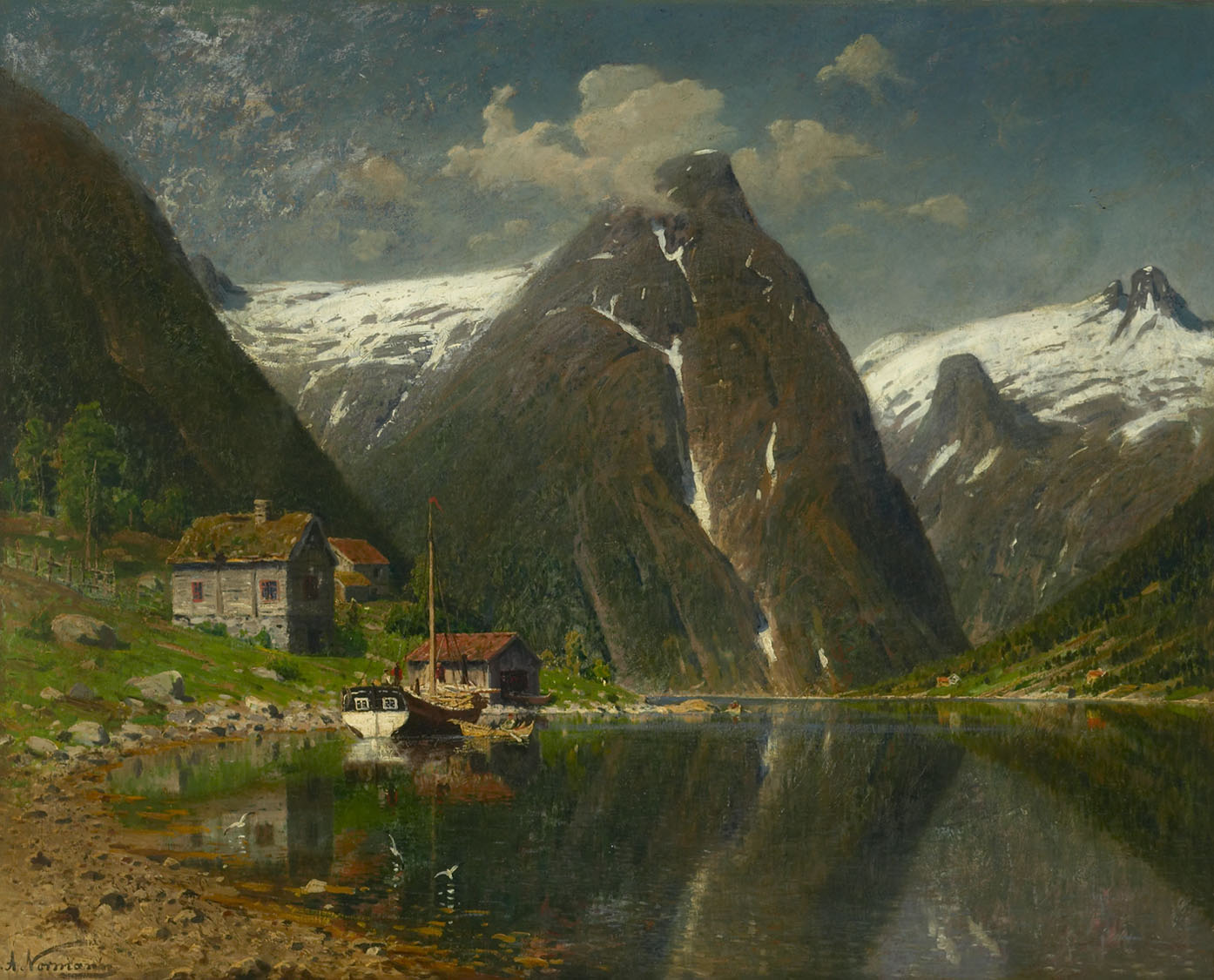
Painting: Munken gård i Esefjorden Credit: Adelsteen Normann

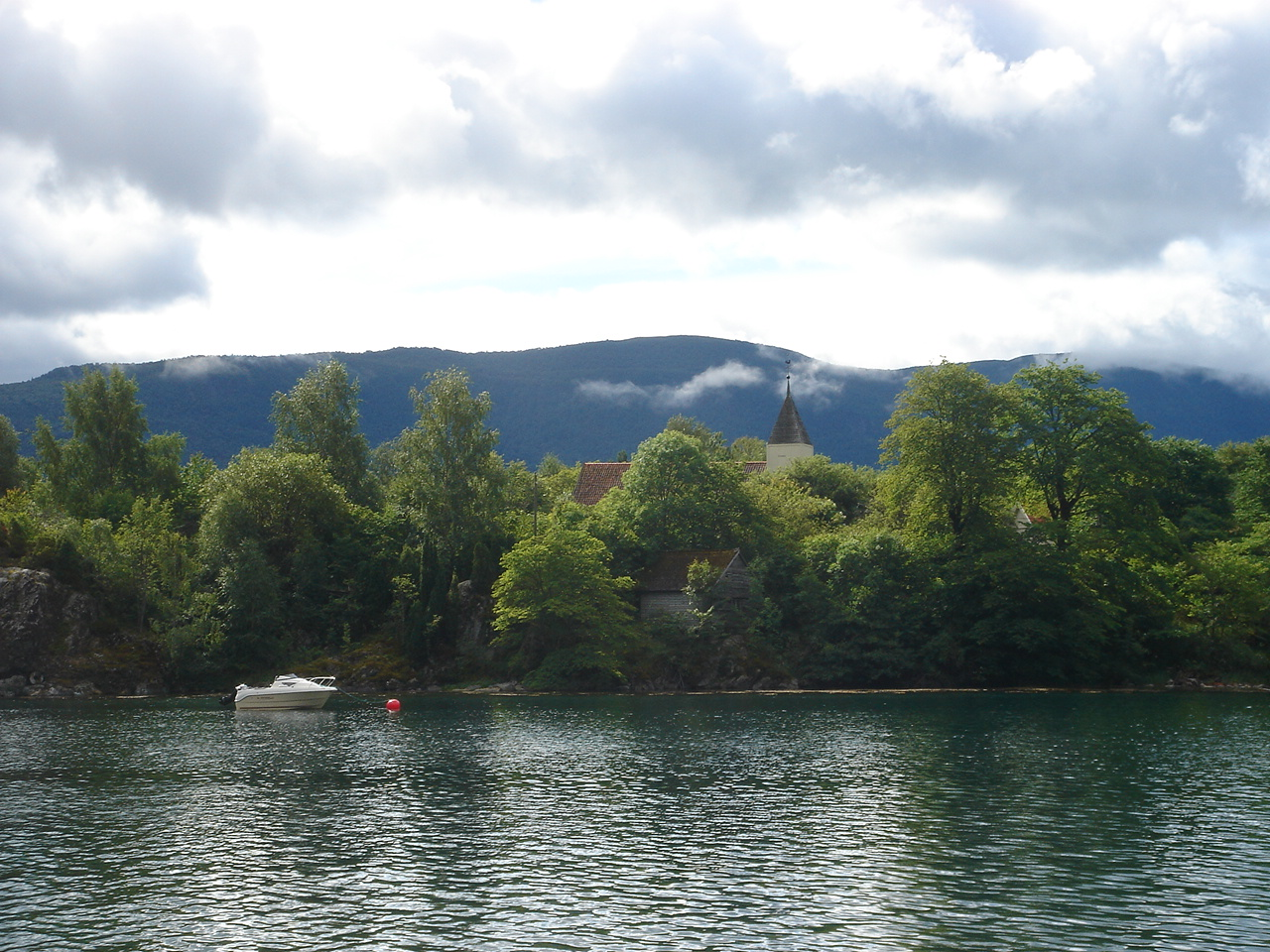
Kvamsøy Church on Kvamsøy island

The prestegjeld of Balestrand was established as a municipality in 1850 when the large Leikanger Municipality was divided as follows:

- the parishes of Vangsnes, Tjugum, and Mundal (population: 2,122) became the new Balestrand Municipality
- the parishes of Leikanger, Fresvik, and Rinde (population: 2,368) continued on as a smaller Leikanger Municipality

In 1861, the Mundal parish was renamed Fjærland.

During the 1960s, there were many municipal mergers across Norway due to the work of the Schei Committee. On 1 January 1964 several municipalities changed their boundaries in a land trade. of Vik, Leikanger, and Balestrand changed their boundaries in a land trade. After the land trade, Balestrand Municipality had a population of 1,606.

- the parish of Vangsnes (population: 189) was transferred from Balestrand Municipality to Vik Municipality
- the parish of Kvamsøy (population: 389) was transferred from Vik Municipality to Balestrand Municipality
- the Hella-Eitorn area (population: 31) was transferred from Balestrand Municipality to Leikanger Municipality

The Fjærland area of Balestrand Municipality had always been isolated from the rest of the municipality, and only accessible by boat. In 1995, the Frudal Tunnel was completed connecting Fjærland to neighboring Sogndal Municipality (and not to the rest of Balestrand). This caused discussions about Fjærland's municipal future. On 1 January 2000, the entire parish of Fjærland in northern Balestrand Municipality was transferred to Sogndal Municipality.

On 1 January 2020, Balestrand Municipality ceased to exist. The far western Nesse area of Balestrand Municipality was transferred to the neighboring Høyanger Municipality and the rest of Balestrand Municipality was merged with the neighboring Leikanger Municipality and Sogndal Municipality to form a much larger Sogndal Municipality.

=== Name ===
The municipality is named Balestrand, a compound name for the area that was created in 1832 by the Norwegian writer Henrik Wergeland. The first element is the name of the old Bale farm (Old Norse: Bali). The farm name is identical to the word bali which means "grassy hillside". The last element is derived from the word strǫnd which means "beach" or "shore". Thus the "shore along the grassy hillside."

=== Coat of arms ===
The coat of arms was granted on 23 October 1989. The official blazon is "Azure, a down-pointing sword argent issuant from the base" (Norwegian: På blå grunn eit oppveksande nedvend sølv sverd). This means the arms have a blue field (background) and the charge is the hilt of a Viking sword. The charge has a tincture of argent which means it is commonly colored white, but if it is made out of metal, then silver is used. The design symbolizes an old Viking sword found in the burial mound in Balestrand. The sword is believed to belong to King Bele from Frithiof's Saga. The arms were designed by Inge Rotevatn. The municipal flag has the same design as the coat of arms.

=== Churches ===
The Church of Norway had one parish (sokn) within Balestrand Municipality. It was part of the Sogn prosti (deanery) in the Diocese of Bjørgvin.

Churches in Balestrand Municipality
Parish (sokn)	Church name	Location of the church	Year built
Balestrand	Kvamsøy Church	Kvamsøy	1290
Balestrand	Sæle Church	Sæle	1903
Balestrand	Tjugum Church	Dragsviki	1863

There is also one Anglican church in Balestrand:

- St. Olaf's Church (built in 1897) is located in the village of Balestrand.

== Government ==
While it existed, Balestrand Municipality was responsible for primary education (through 10th grade), outpatient health services, senior citizen services, welfare and other social services, zoning, economic development, and municipal roads and utilities. The municipality was governed by a municipal council of directly elected representatives. The mayor was indirectly elected by a vote of the municipal council. The municipality was under the jurisdiction of the Sogn og Fjordane District Court and the Gulating Court of Appeal.

=== Municipal council ===
The municipal council (Kommunestyre) of Balestrand Municipality was made up of 17 representatives that were elected to four year terms. The tables below show the historical composition of the council by political party.

Balestrand kommunestyre 2015–2019
Party name (in Nynorsk)	Number of representatives
Labour Party (Arbeidarpartiet)	4
Conservative Party (Høgre)	2
Christian Democratic Party (Kristeleg Folkeparti)	3
Centre Party (Senterpartiet)	5
Socialist Left Party (Sosialistisk Venstreparti)	1
Liberal Party (Venstre)	2
Total number of members:	17
Note: On 1 January 2020, Balestrand Municipality, Leikanger Municipality, and Sogndal Municipality were merged to form the new Sogndal Municipality.

Balestrand kommunestyre 2011–2015
Party name (in Nynorsk)	Number of representatives
Labour Party (Arbeidarpartiet)	4
Conservative Party (Høgre)	5
Christian Democratic Party (Kristeleg Folkeparti)	2
Centre Party (Senterpartiet)	3
Socialist Left Party (Sosialistisk Venstreparti)	1
Liberal Party (Venstre)	2
Total number of members:	17

Balestrand kommunestyre 2007–2011
Party name (in Nynorsk)	Number of representatives
Labour Party (Arbeidarpartiet)	3
Conservative Party (Høgre)	4
Christian Democratic Party (Kristeleg Folkeparti)	3
Centre Party (Senterpartiet)	4
Liberal Party (Venstre)	3
Total number of members:	17

Balestrand kommunestyre 2003–2007
Party name (in Nynorsk)	Number of representatives
Labour Party (Arbeidarpartiet)	4
Conservative Party (Høgre)	2
Christian Democratic Party (Kristeleg Folkeparti)	3
Centre Party (Senterpartiet)	2
Socialist Left Party (Sosialistisk Venstreparti)	2
Liberal Party (Venstre)	4
Total number of members:	17

Balestrand kommunestyre 1999–2003
Party name (in Nynorsk)	Number of representatives
Labour Party (Arbeidarpartiet)	4
Conservative Party (Høgre)	2
Christian Democratic Party (Kristeleg Folkeparti)	2
Centre Party (Senterpartiet)	2
Liberal Party (Venstre)	6
Joint list of the Red Electoral Alliance (Raud Valallianse) and the Socialist Left Party (Sosialistisk Venstreparti)	1
Total number of members:	17

Balestrand kommunestyre 1995–1999
Party name (in Nynorsk)	Number of representatives
Labour Party (Arbeidarpartiet)	4
Conservative Party (Høgre)	2
Christian Democratic Party (Kristeleg Folkeparti)	3
Centre Party (Senterpartiet)	7
Liberal Party (Venstre)	4
Joint list of the Red Electoral Alliance (Raud Valallianse) and the Socialist Left Party (Sosialistisk Venstreparti)	1
Total number of members:	21

Balestrand kommunestyre 1991–1995
Party name (in Nynorsk)	Number of representatives
Labour Party (Arbeidarpartiet)	4
Conservative Party (Høgre)	3
Christian Democratic Party (Kristeleg Folkeparti)	3
Red Electoral Alliance (Raud Valallianse)	1
Centre Party (Senterpartiet)	7
Liberal Party (Venstre)	3
Total number of members:	21

Balestrand kommunestyre 1987–1991
Party name (in Nynorsk)	Number of representatives
Labour Party (Arbeidarpartiet)	5
Conservative Party (Høgre)	4
Christian Democratic Party (Kristeleg Folkeparti)	4
Centre Party (Senterpartiet)	6
Liberal Party (Venstre)	2
Total number of members:	21

Balestrand kommunestyre 1983–1987
Party name (in Nynorsk)	Number of representatives
Labour Party (Arbeidarpartiet)	5
Conservative Party (Høgre)	4
Christian Democratic Party (Kristeleg Folkeparti)	4
Centre Party (Senterpartiet)	6
Liberal Party (Venstre)	2
Total number of members:	21

Balestrand kommunestyre 1979–1983
Party name (in Nynorsk)	Number of representatives
Labour Party (Arbeidarpartiet)	4
Conservative Party (Høgre)	4
Christian Democratic Party (Kristeleg Folkeparti)	3
Centre Party (Senterpartiet)	6
Liberal Party (Venstre)	3
Local list in Balestrand (Bygdalista i Balestrand)	1
Total number of members:	21

Balestrand kommunestyre 1975–1979
Party name (in Nynorsk)	Number of representatives
Labour Party (Arbeidarpartiet)	4
Conservative Party (Høgre)	3
Christian Democratic Party (Kristeleg Folkeparti)	4
Centre Party (Senterpartiet)	8
Liberal Party (Venstre)	2
Total number of members:	21

Balestrand kommunestyre 1971–1975
Party name (in Nynorsk)	Number of representatives
Labour Party (Arbeidarpartiet)	4
Conservative Party (Høgre)	3
Christian Democratic Party (Kristeleg Folkeparti)	3
Centre Party (Senterpartiet)	8
Liberal Party (Venstre)	3
Total number of members:	21

Balestrand kommunestyre 1967–1971
Party name (in Nynorsk)	Number of representatives
Labour Party (Arbeidarpartiet)	4
Conservative Party (Høgre)	4
Centre Party (Senterpartiet)	6
Liberal Party (Venstre)	5
Local List(s) (Lokale lister)	2
Total number of members:	21

Balestrand kommunestyre 1963–1967
Party name (in Nynorsk)	Number of representatives
Labour Party (Arbeidarpartiet)	4
Conservative Party (Høgre)	4
Centre Party (Senterpartiet)	7
Liberal Party (Venstre)	6
Total number of members:	21

Balestrand heradsstyre 1959–1963
Party name (in Nynorsk)	Number of representatives
Labour Party (Arbeidarpartiet)	4
Conservative Party (Høgre)	4
Centre Party (Senterpartiet)	7
Liberal Party (Venstre)	6
Total number of members:	21

Balestrand heradsstyre 1955–1959
Party name (in Nynorsk)	Number of representatives
Labour Party (Arbeidarpartiet)	4
Conservative Party (Høgre)	3
Farmers' Party (Bondepartiet)	5
Liberal Party (Venstre)	6
Local List(s) (Lokale lister)	3
Total number of members:	21

Balestrand heradsstyre 1951–1955
Party name (in Nynorsk)	Number of representatives
Labour Party (Arbeidarpartiet)	6
Conservative Party (Høgre)	3
Farmers' Party (Bondepartiet)	6
Liberal Party (Venstre)	6
Local List(s) (Lokale lister)	3
Total number of members:	24

Balestrand heradsstyre 1947–1951
Party name (in Nynorsk)	Number of representatives
Labour Party (Arbeidarpartiet)	6
Conservative Party (Høgre)	3
Farmers' Party (Bondepartiet)	2
Liberal Party (Venstre)	6
Joint List(s) of Non-Socialist Parties (Borgarlege Felleslister)	3
Local List(s) (Lokale lister)	4
Total number of members:	24

Balestrand heradsstyre 1945–1947
Party name (in Nynorsk)	Number of representatives
Labour Party (Arbeidarpartiet)	3
Farmers' Party (Bondepartiet)	2
Liberal Party (Venstre)	3
List of workers, fishermen, and small farmholders (Arbeidarar, fiskarar, småbrukarar liste)	3
Local List(s) (Lokale lister)	13
Total number of members:	24

Balestrand heradsstyre 1937–1941*
Party name (in Nynorsk)	Number of representatives
Labour Party (Arbeidarpartiet)	5
Farmers' Party (Bondepartiet)	5
Liberal Party (Venstre)	3
Joint List(s) of Non-Socialist Parties (Borgarlege Felleslister)	11
Total number of members:	24
Note: Due to the German occupation of Norway during World War II, no elections were held for new municipal councils until after the war ended in 1945.

=== Mayors ===
The mayor (Nynorsk: ordførar) of Balestrand Municipality was the political leader of the municipality and the chairperson of the municipal council. The following people held this position:

- 1850–1879: Rev. Harald Ulrik Sverdrup
- 1880–1883: Sjur S. Bjaastad
- 1884–1885: Anders L. Ese
- 1886–1887: Sjur S. Bjaastad
- 1888–1895: Anders L. Ese
- 1896–1901: Sjur S. Bjaastad
- 1902–1922: Ole Tjugum
- 1923–1925: Per Hovland
- 1926–1934: Hermund J. Bale
- 1934–1935: Sigurd Kvikne, Sr.
- 1936–1941: Anders Johanneson Bøyum (V)
- 1941–1942: Anders Gjerde (H)
- 1945–1947: Anders Johanneson Bøyum (V)
- 1948–1959: Per P. Hovland (Bp)
- 1960–1961: Sverre Aardal (Sp)
- 1961–1971: Per Horpedal (Sp)
- 1972–1974: Karl Munkerud (Sp)
- 1975–1975: Haakon Steine (H)
- 1976–1981: Tor Tjugum (Sp)
- 1982–1983: Jens K. Ese (H)
- 1984–1995: Olav J. Ulvestad (Sp)
- 1995–2003: Åse Kari Einevoll (V)
- 2003–2007: Erland A. Fagermoen (KrF)
- 2007–2011: Einar Målsnes (H)
- 2011–2019: Harald Offerdal (Ap)

== Geography ==
Balestrand Municipality was located between the high snow-covered Gaularfjellet mountains in the center of the beautiful, lush Sognefjorden. Three fjord arms stretched inland, winding through the mountains which was dotted with charming hamlets: Lånefjorden, Esefjorden, and Vetlefjorden. The Fjærlandsfjorden ran along the eastern border of the municipality. The Jostefonni glacier sits at the very northernmost part of the municipality. The highest point in the municipality was the 1,615-metre (5,299 ft) tall mountain Sunnfjordbjørnen on the Jostefonni glacier on the border with Gaular Municipality.

Balestrand Municipality was bordered to the west by Høyanger Municipality and Gaular Municipality, to the north by Førde Municipality, and to the east by Sogndal Municipality and Leikanger Municipality. Across the Sognefjorden to the south was Vik Municipality.

== Attractions ==
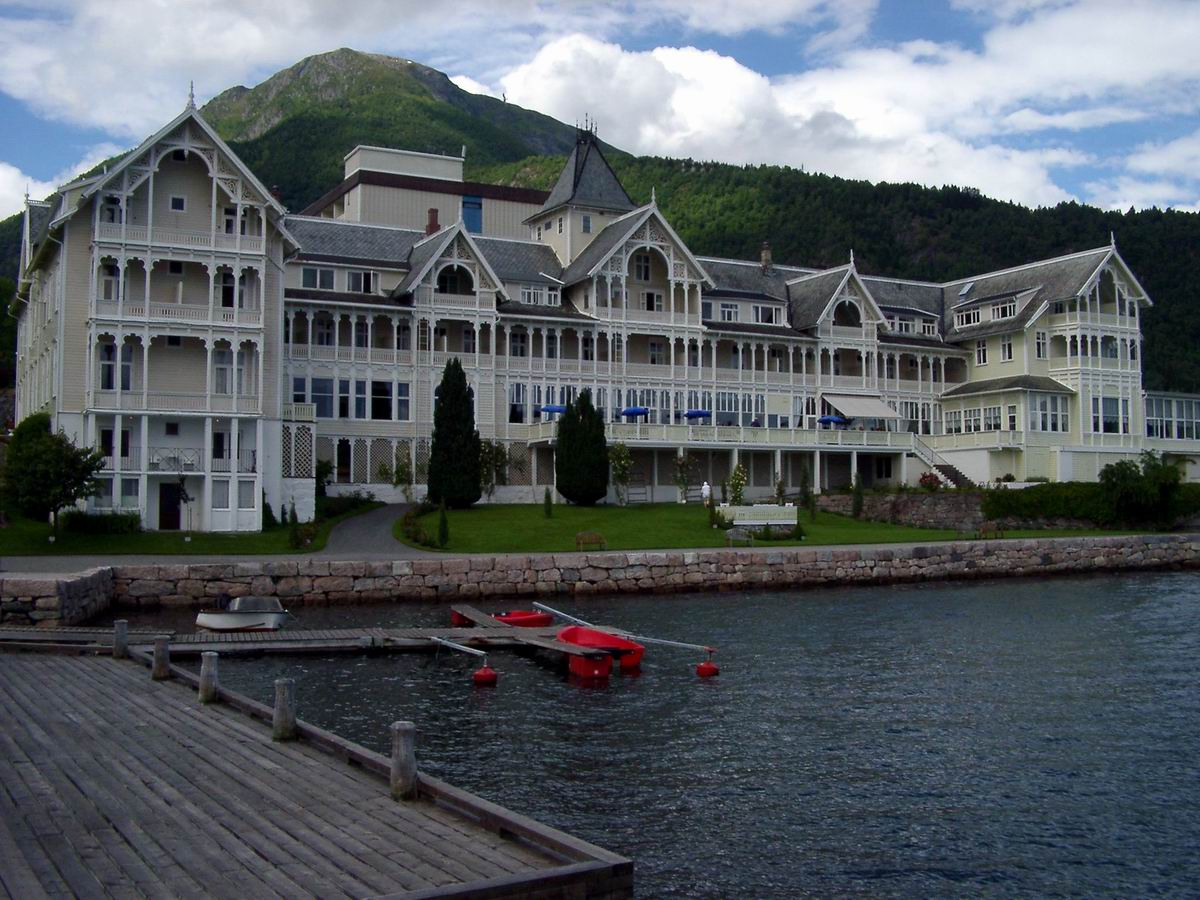
Kviknes hotel in Balestrand

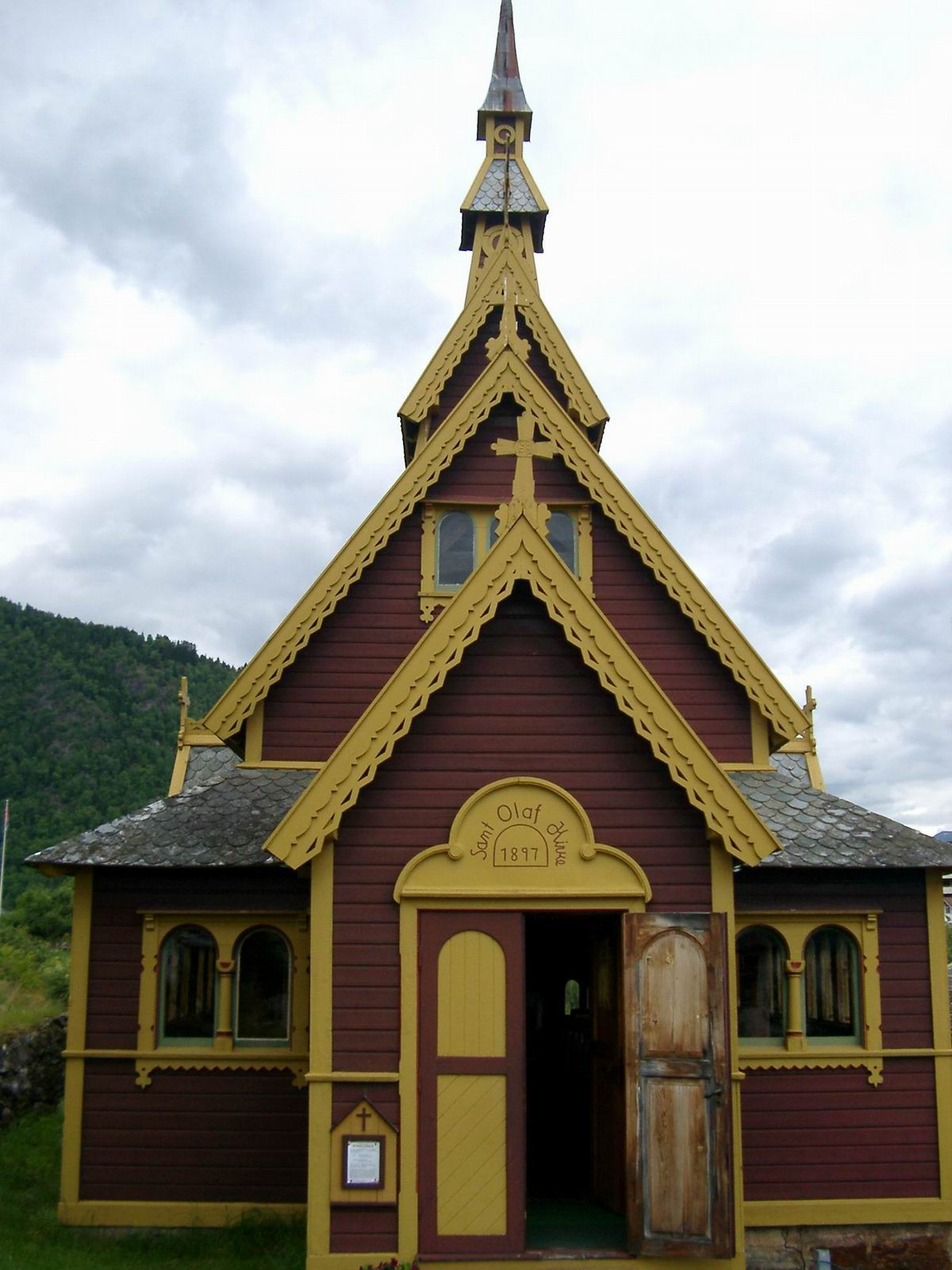
St. Olaf's Anglican Church

=== Kvikne's Hotel ===
Built in the 19th century, the Kvikne's Hotel is one of the most famous buildings in Balestrand. The Kvikne family, who own the place, took it over in 1877. Since then the establishment has undergone constant development which continues to this day. There are many new buildings and remodeling and expansion projects have been carried out.

Today, the hotel offers modern facilities while reflecting its history and local culture. With 200 rooms, it is also one of Norway's largest hotels catering to tourists. An extensive collection of art and historical pieces are central features of the hotel's interior.

Kviknes Hotel was made popular for European visitors in the early part of the 20th century by Kaiser Wilhelm II, who often visited there during his summer vacations prior to World War I. The hotel still possesses the chair he used in their restaurant. The Kaiser is accompanied on the list by a number of emperors, kings, presidents, Prime ministers, film stars, and artists from many countries.

=== St. Olaf's Church ===
St. Olaf's Church, also known as the English Church, is an Anglican church built in the style of a Stave church. The church was completed in 1897 as a memorial to Margaret Green. Margaret, an English lady, came to the fjords as a tourist to hike the mountains. She met, fell in love with and married Knut Kvikne who was an avid mountain man. Being a very pious woman, she wished for an Anglican church in Balestrand. She started the church with her husband, but died before its completion. Sunday services are held during the summer months, being conducted by rotating vicars from England.

St. Olaf's Church is notable as the inspiration for the chapel in Elsa's coronation scene in the 2013 Disney film Frozen.

=== Other attractions ===
- Songnefjord Aquarium
- Balejazz summer jazz festival
- Balestrand Art Village
- The Norwegian Museum of Travel and Tourism

== Notable people ==
- Christian Garup Meidell (1780 in Balestrand – 1863), a military officer and politician; first Mayor of Leikanger in 1838-1839
- Jakob Sverdrup (1845–1899), a Norwegian bishop and politician, raised in Balestrand
- Georg Sverdrup (1848 in Balestrand – 1907), a Norwegian-American Lutheran theologian and teacher
- Edvard Sverdrup (1861 in Balestrand – 1923), an educator, author, church leader, and a key theologian in the Church of Norway in early 20thC.
- Anders Johanneson Bøyum (1890 in Balestrand – 1962), a politician who was mayor of Balestrand before and after WWII
- Trygve Heltveit (1913 in Balestrand – 1985), a philologist.

== See also ==
- List of former municipalities of Norway
