= Adelsteen Normann =

Norwegian painter (1848–1918)

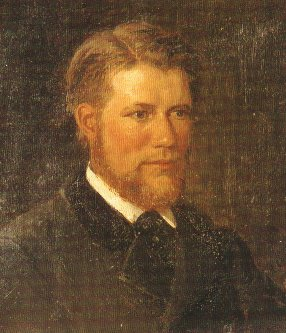
- Possible self-portrait
- Born: Eilert Adelsteen Normann; 1 May 1848; Bodin, Sweden-Norway
- Died: 26 December 1918 (aged 70); Kristiania, Norway
- Resting place: Stahnsdorf South-Western Cemetery
- Occupation: Painter
- Known for: Landscape painting
- Spouses: Catharina Weitgan (m. 1870; died 1911); Luise Rostalski (m. 1911)

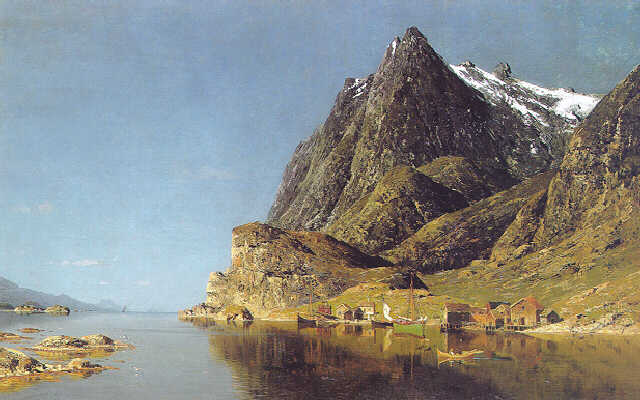
View of a Fjord

Eilert Adelsteen Normann (1 May 1848 – 26 December 1918) was a Norwegian painter who worked in Berlin. He was a noted painter of landscapes of Norway. Normann was the artist who invited Edvard Munch to Berlin, where he painted The Scream. Normann's fjord paintings are credited with making the Norwegian fjords a more popular tourist destination.

== Biography ==
Normann was born in 1848 in Bodin Municipality in Norway. He studied at the Kunstakademie Düsseldorf from 1869 to 1872 and his paintings belong to the Düsseldorf school of painting. He studied with the Estonian painter Eugen Dücker. His paintings were nearly always landscapes and invariably of the fjords of Norway where he would show the water combined with small houses and boats and steep mountainsides.

Beginning in 1883, Normann was based in Berlin. In the early 1890s, Normann was doing good business selling his paintings to hotel owners. After seeing the work of his countryman Edvard Munch when it was exhibited in Kristiania, Normann wrote to Munch asking if he would exhibit his work in Berlin. Munch was so overcome that he packed up his exhibition on 20 October 1892 and went to Berlin where Normann befriended him. Munch's work was placed in an exhibition which caused such a stir that the painters in Berlin split into two societies. (It was suspected that the underlying reason for Normann's invitation to Munch was to cause this split).

Normann exhibited in Oslo, Berlin, London, Vienna, Düsseldorf, Munich and Paris. Although based in Germany from 1883, he would return to Norway each summer. Normann and Hans Dahl both had large ornamented wooden villas near Balestrand where they would entertain. His "dragon style" house was bought in 1891 and built (like many Norwegian houses) from a pre-fabricated kit from the city of Trondheim. The house stayed with his heirs until 1934.

Normann notably exhibited at the prestigious Salon de Paris from as early as 1882. His paintings earned a 'Mention Honorable' in 1884 and he was awarded a bronze medal in 1889. It is assumed that his fjord paintings contributed to make the Norwegian fjords a popular tourist destination.

He died in Kristiania (now: Oslo) on 26 December 1918, during the worldwide Spanish flu pandemic. His urn is placed in the Norwegian-style chapel of Stahnsdorf South-Western Cemetery near Berlin.

== Legacy ==
Normann's paintings are included in galleries in Bergen, Boston, Cincinnati, Cologne, Dresden, Leeds, Liverpool and Stockholm. In Normann's birthplace in 2010 is a dedicated gallery which has thirty of his paintings.

== Selected paintings ==
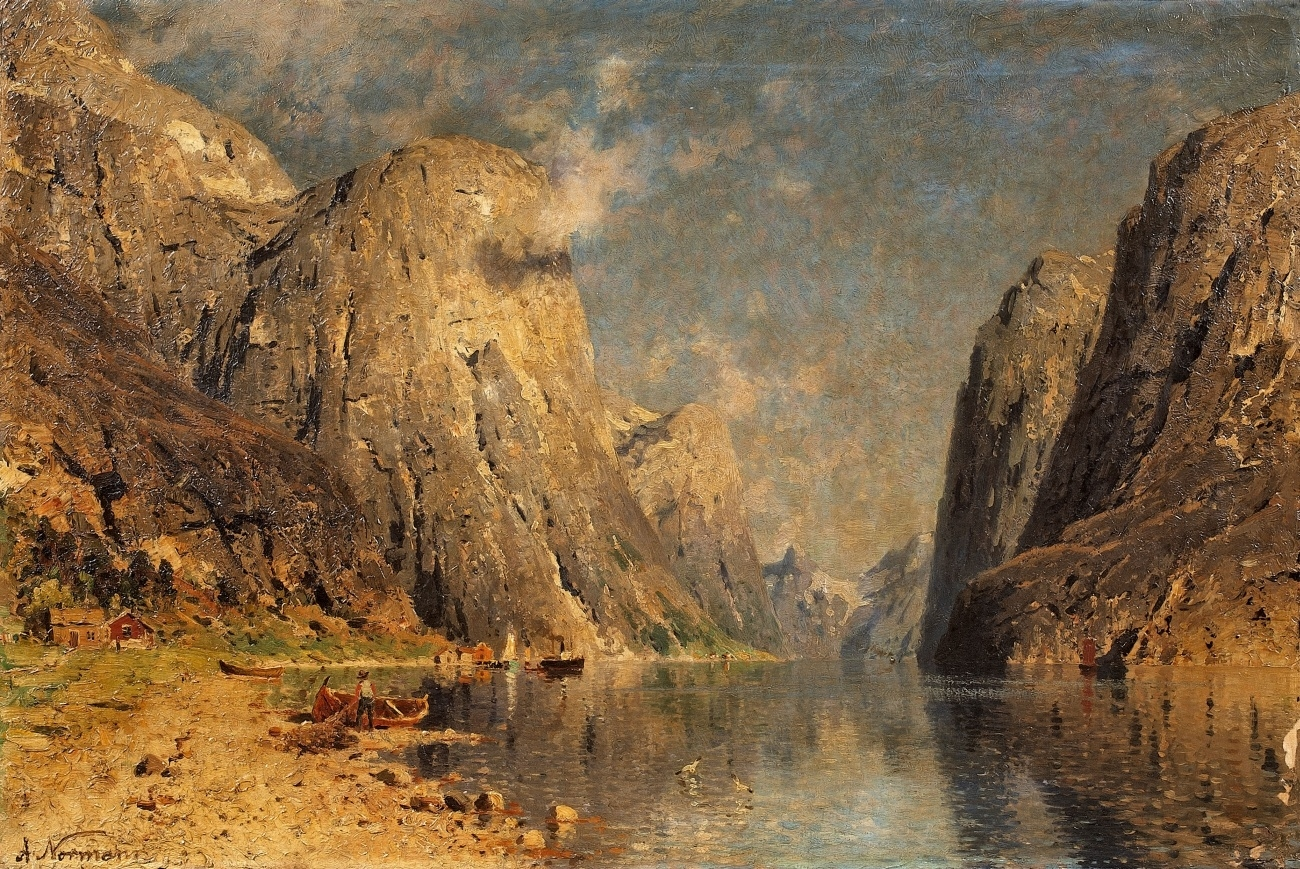
Sognefjord

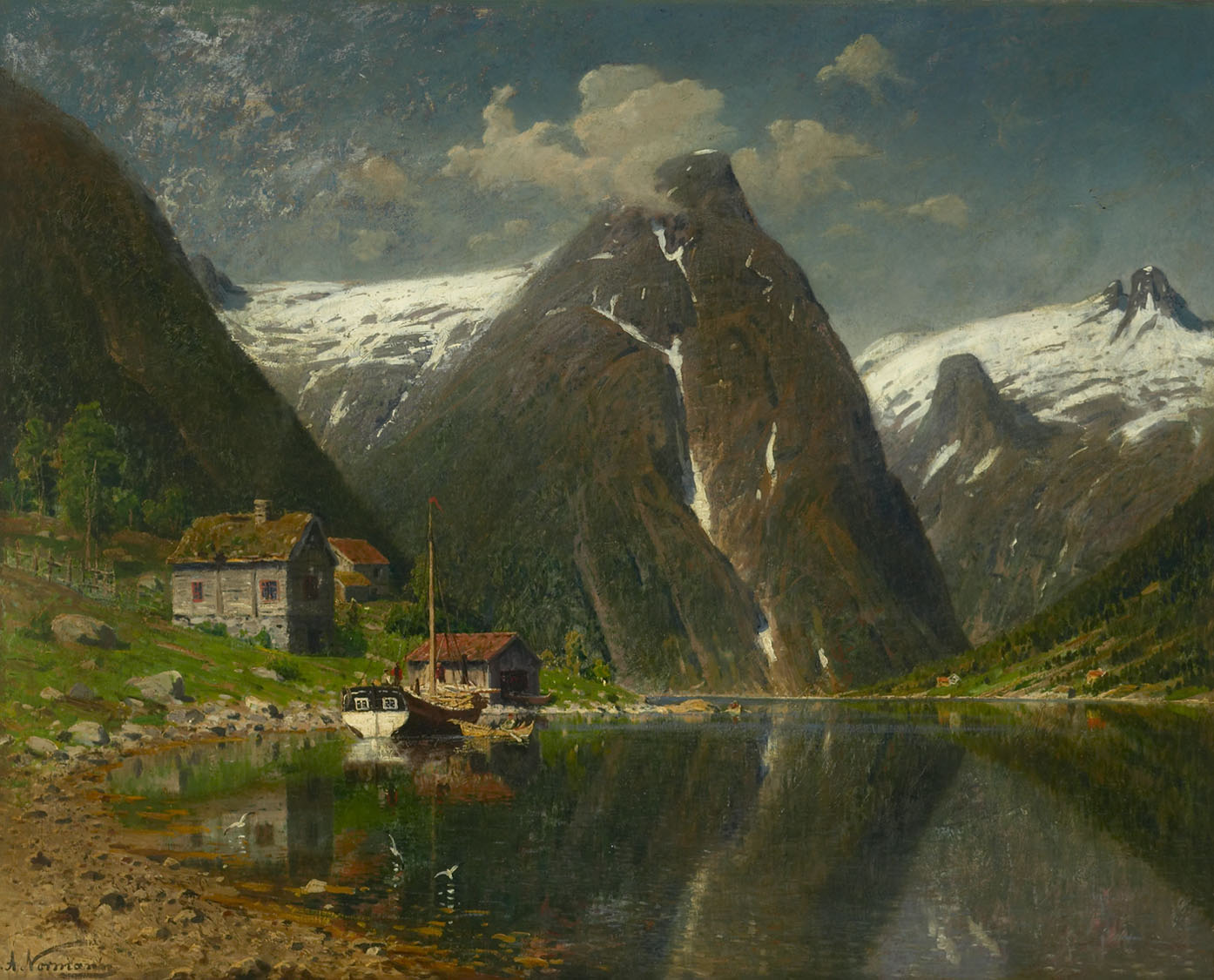
Farm at Esefjord

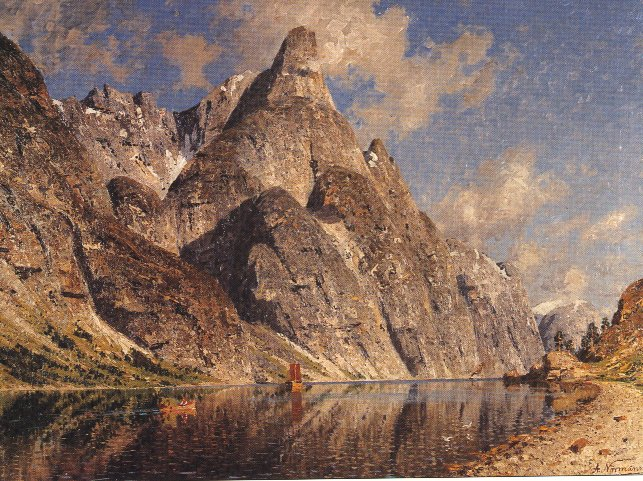
Trollfjord in Lofoten near Vesterålen
