= Hans Dahl =

Norwegian painter (1849–1937)

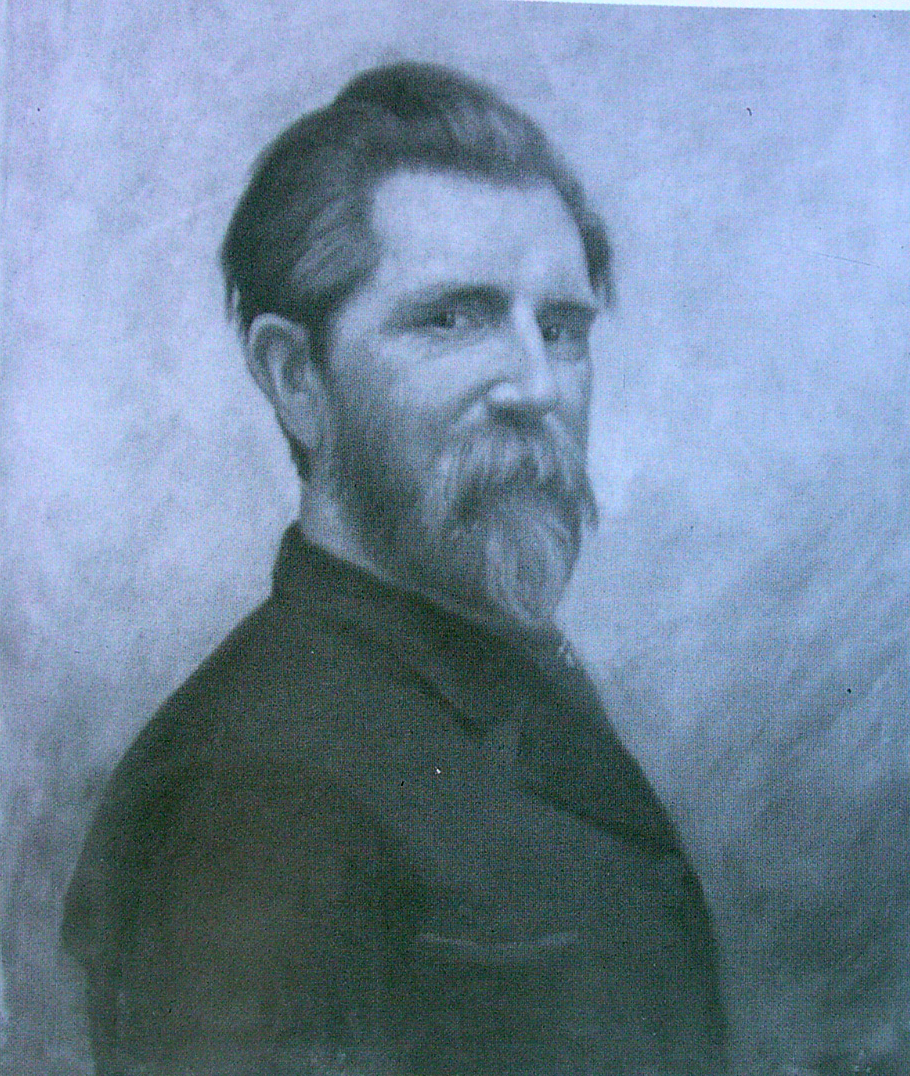
- Born: 19 February 1849; Granvin, Hardanger, Sweden-Norway
- Died: 27 July 1937 (aged 88); Balestrand, Sogn og Fjordane, Norway
- Education: Kunstakademie Düsseldorf
- Known for: Painting
- Notable work: Landscape paintings
- Movement: Norwegian romanticist

Hans Dahl (19 February 1849 – 27 July 1937) was a Norwegian painter. He was best known for his paintings of Norwegian fjords and surrounding landscapes.

== Background ==
Hans Dahl was born in the village of Granvin, on the Hardangerfjord in Søndre Bergenhus, Norway. His talent was already evident when Dahl was 16 years old. However, it was only after service in the army that Dahl received artistic education. Hans Dahl was educated first to become an officer and became a lieutenant in 1871. He served in the Bergenske Brigade until 1874. After leaving the army, he apprenticed with Johan Fredrik Eckersberg and Knud Bergslien. He went to Karlsruhe, where he studied under Hans Fredrik Gude and Wilhelm Riefstahl and then to Düsseldorf, where his teachers included Eduard von Gebhardt and Wilhelm Sohn. His art became associated with the Düsseldorf school of painting, which was characterized by finely detailed yet still fanciful landscapes.

== Career ==
Dahl had his first exhibition in Düsseldorf in 1876. Dahl lived in Düsseldorf until 1888, when he moved to Berlin. Almost every summer, he was back to Norway. In 1893, he commissioned the firm of Jacob Digre in Trondheim to build his summer residence, Villa Strandheim. It is located on the banks of the Sognefjord at Balestrand in the county of Nordre Bergenhus. Norwegian painter Adelsteen Normann had settled in Balestrand during 1891. Dahl's villa was of a similar design to the villa built for Normann.

Between 1888 and 1919, Dahl lived mostly in Berlin-Wilmersdorf, and spent only the summer in Balestrand. After 1919, Dahl no longer traveled to Berlin. Balestrand became a much visited tourist destination in western Norway. German emperor, Kaiser Wilhelm II, became one of Dahl's patrons, conferring a professorship upon him in 1910, and visiting Dahl in Balestrand several summers in a row.

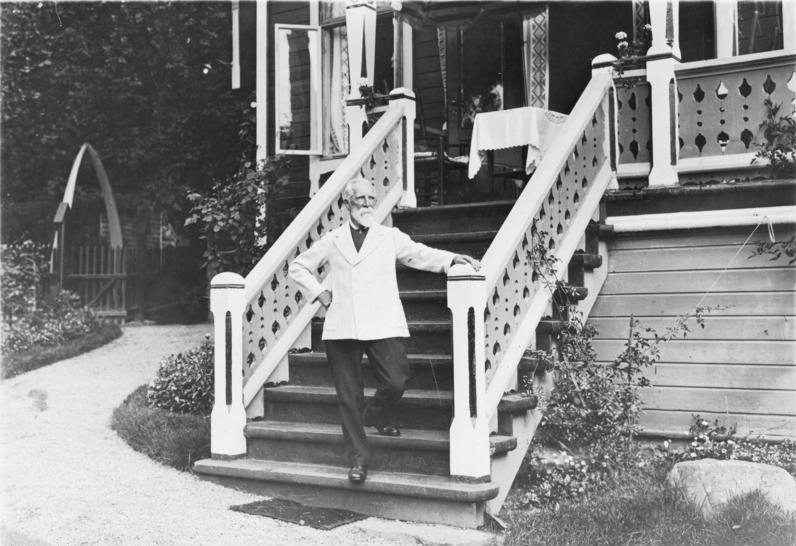
Hans Dahl in front of his villa in Balholmen

Dahl resisted the transition in art from romanticism to modernism. In the 1890s a new school of art arose, and artists like Dahl were not very popular in the leading circles in the capital. He was particularly criticised by the art historian Jens Thiis. He was severely criticized by fellow artists especially by Christian Krohg, who was one of the leading figures in the transition from romanticism to naturalism which characterized Norwegian art in this period. Throughout his life, he increasingly narrowed his range of topics. Dahl often described the scenery of the western part of Norway in brilliant sunshine with smiling people in national costumes. His vibrant colors and charming portrayals of young Norwegian girls in their national costume have always been very popular.

== Personal life ==
Hans Dahl was married to Helene Bewer, the daughter of the German painter Clemens Bewer (1820–1884). Their son was the Norwegian painter Hans Andreas Dahl (1881–1919), who died of tuberculosis at the age of 37.

In 1902 Dahl was appointed knight of the Royal Norwegian Order of St. Olav, 1st class. Hans Dahl died in Balestrand in Sogn og Fjordane during 1937. His grave is located in the churchyard of Tjugum Church.

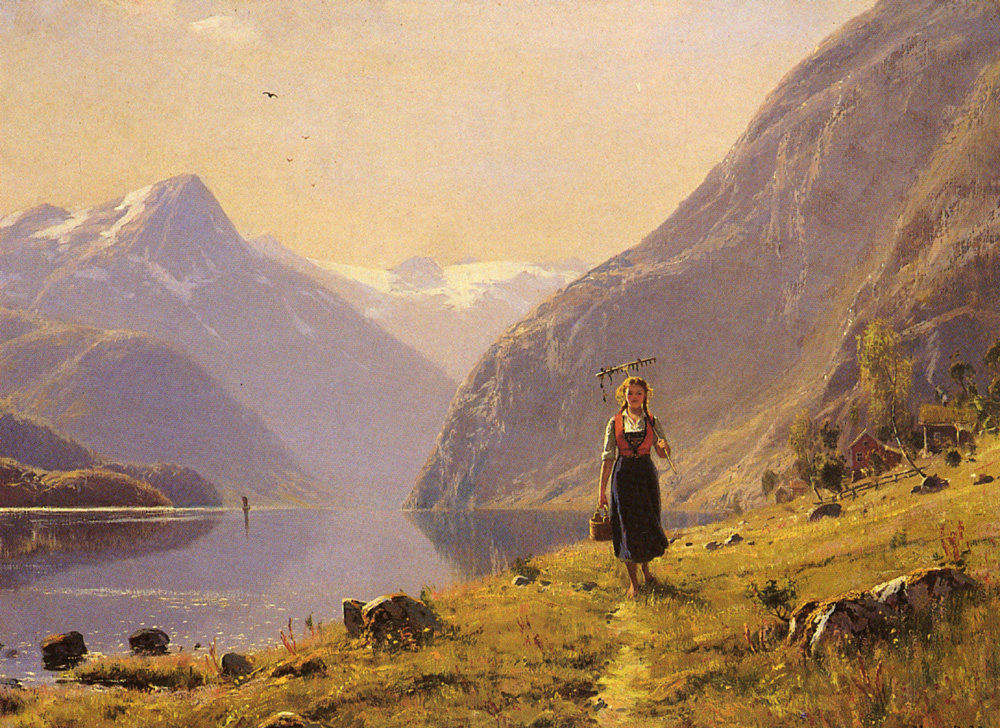
By the Fjord

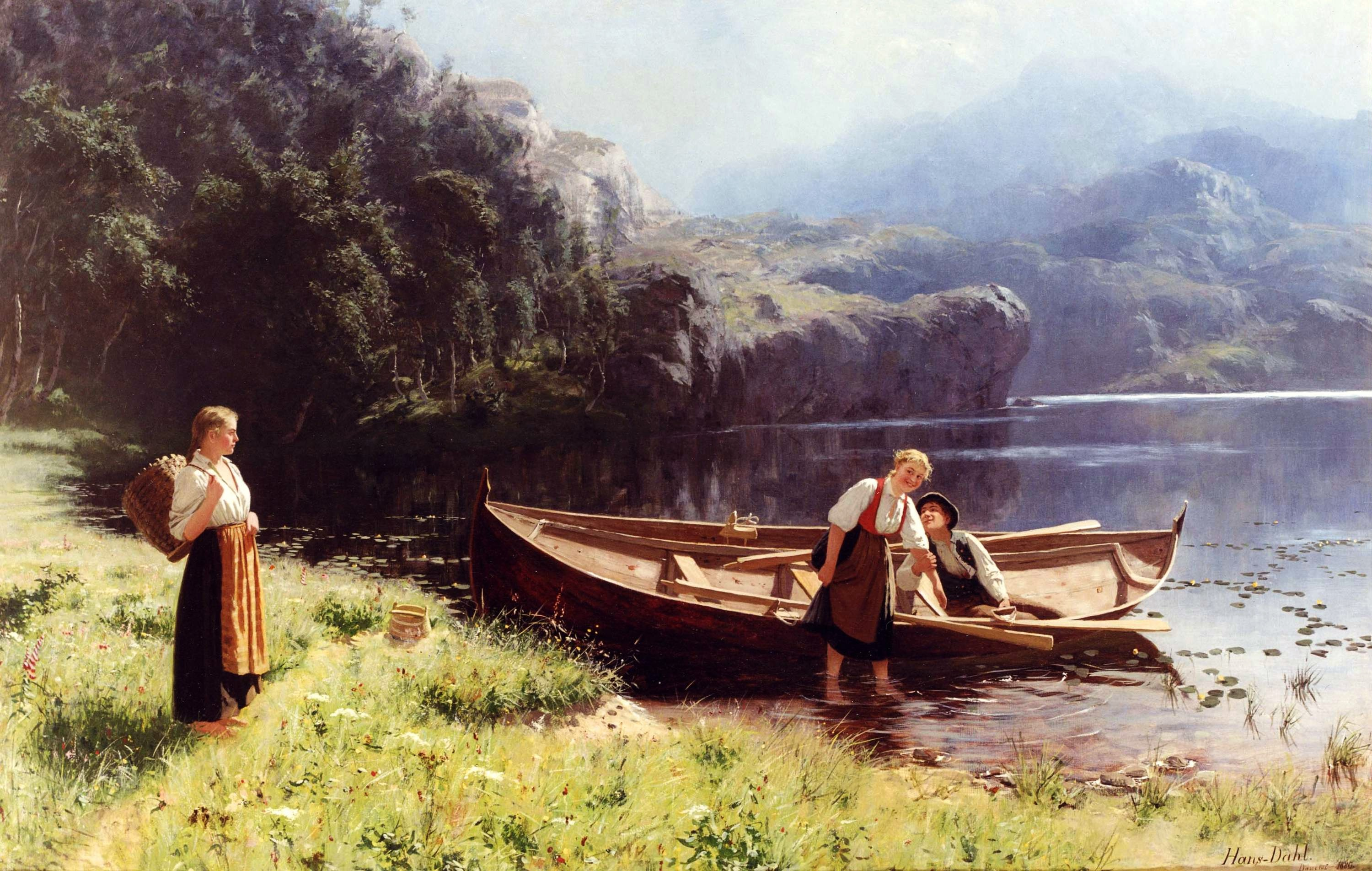
By the Water's Edge

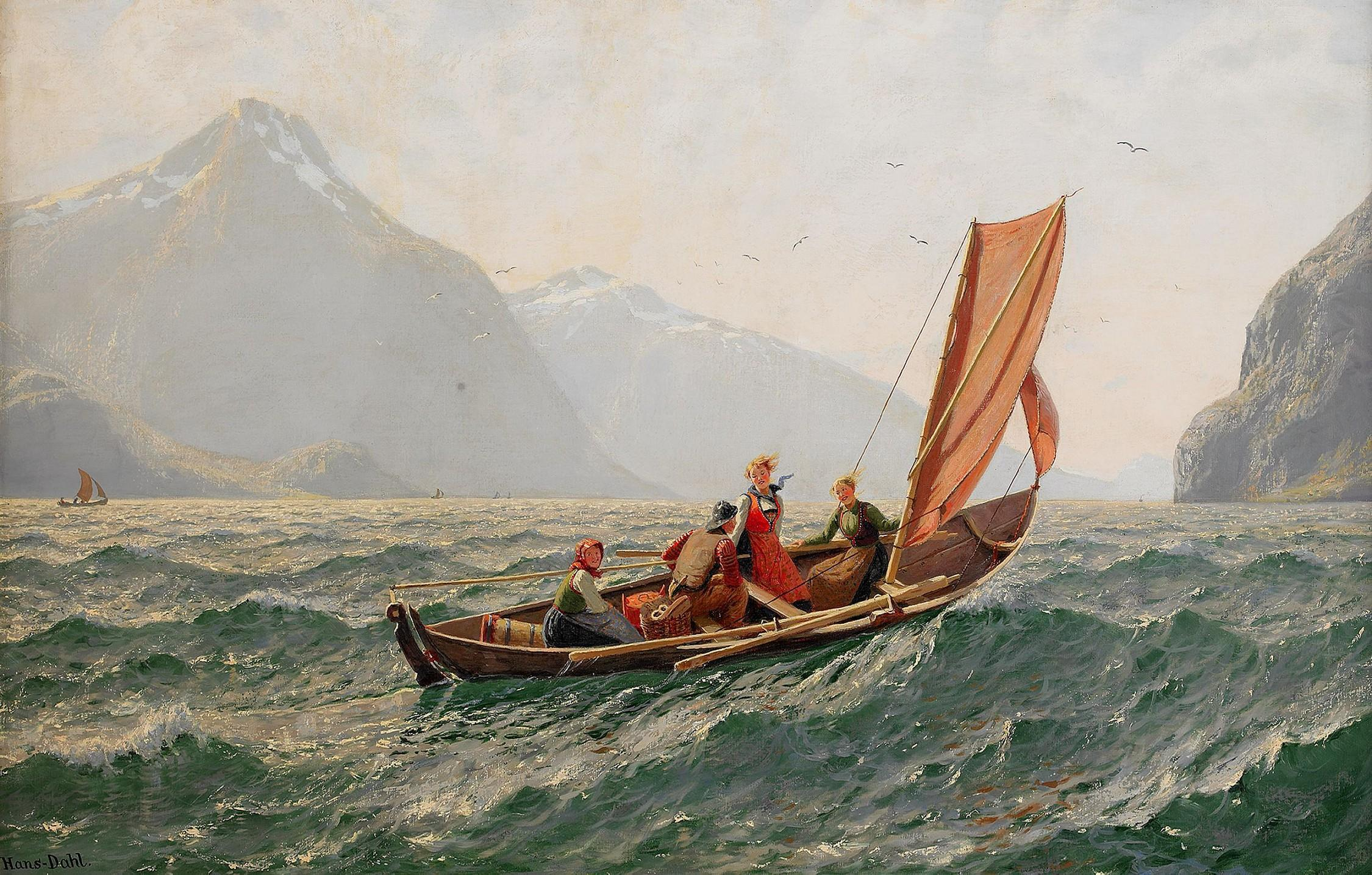
Fjord with sailing boat

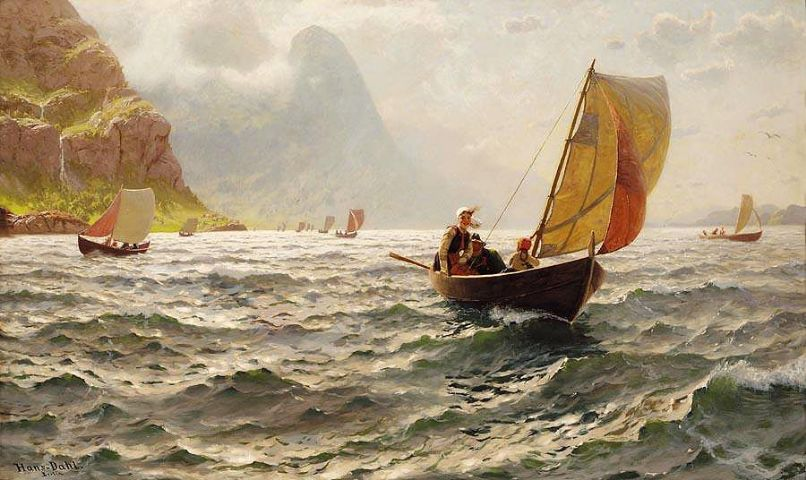
Upon Sunny Waves

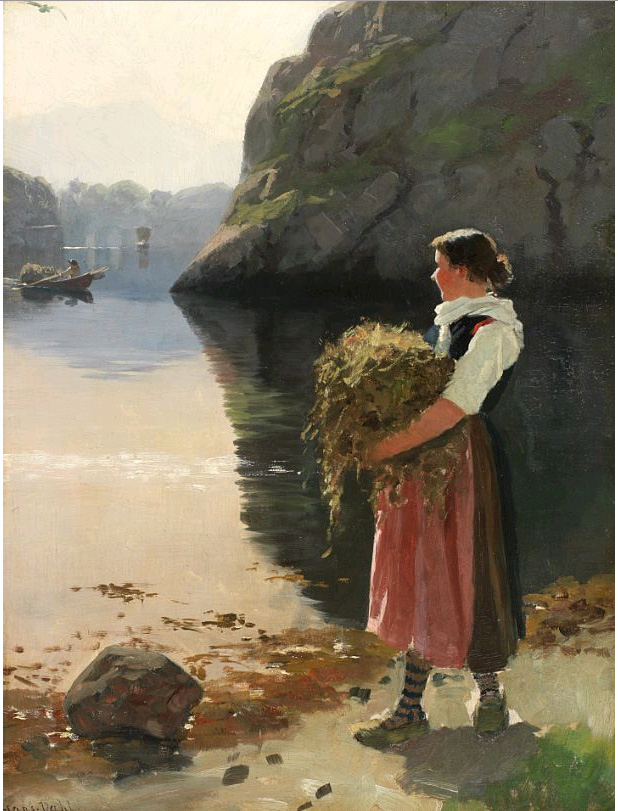
Transporting Hay

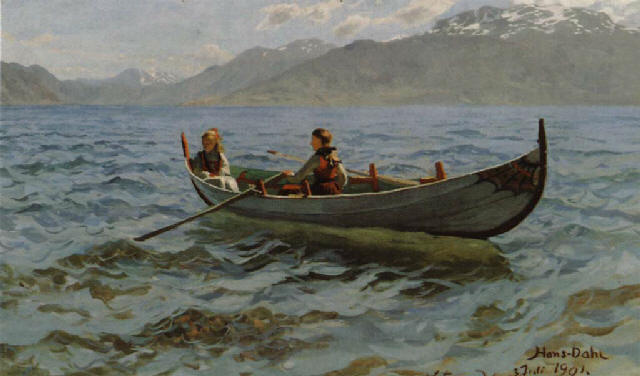
Boating in Balestrand

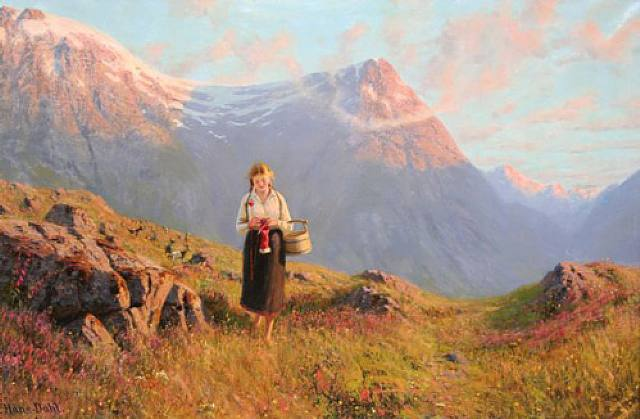
On the Mountaintop

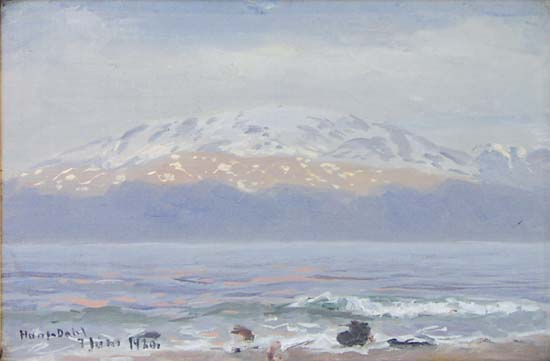
Sognefjord Near Summer Home in Balestrand

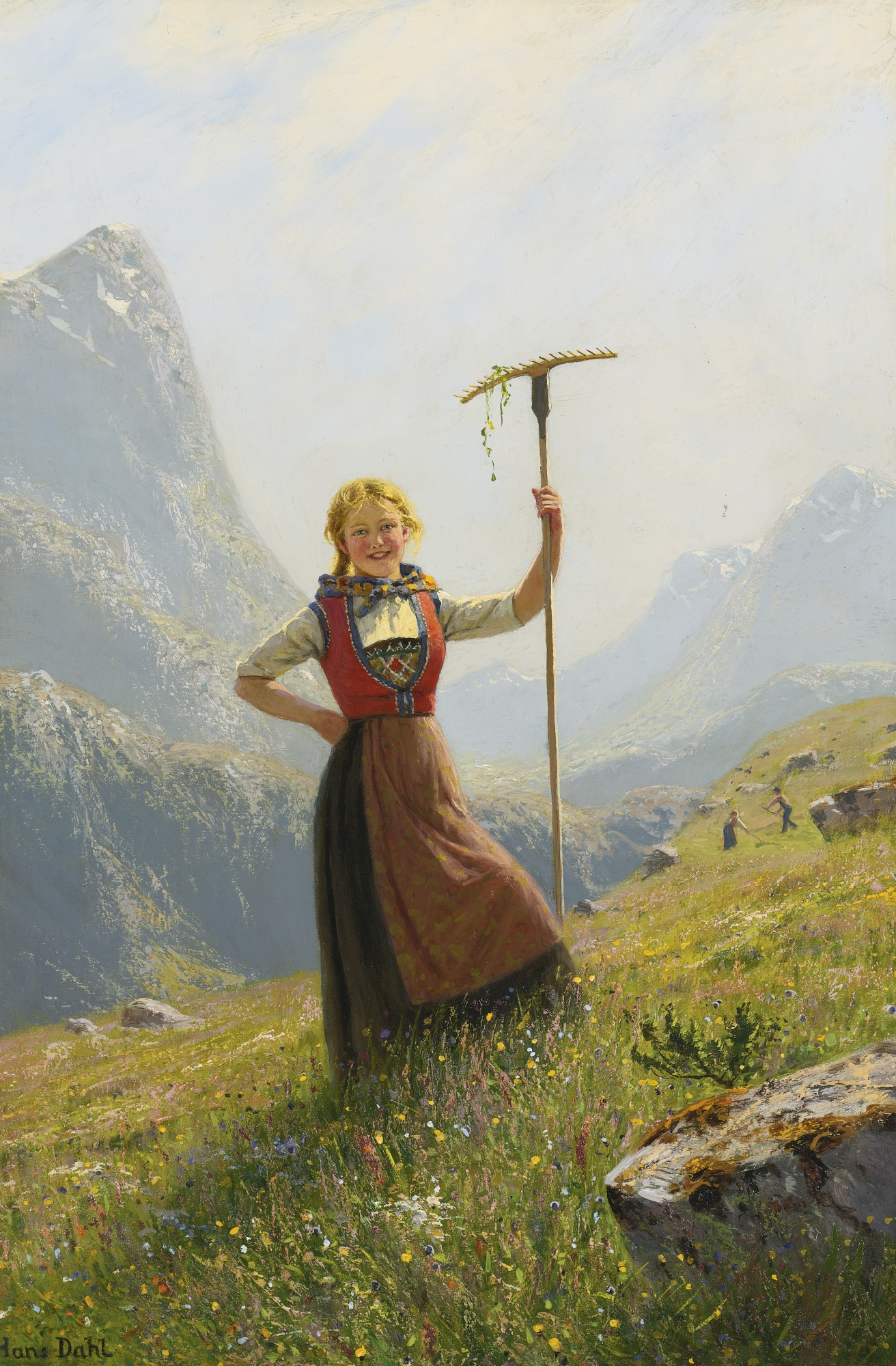
Peasant Girl

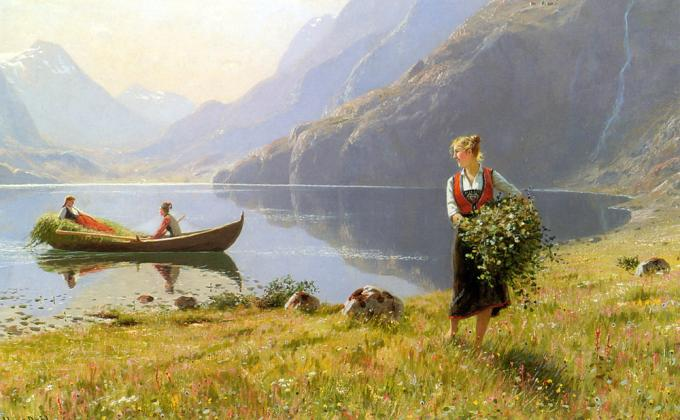
On the banks of the Fjord

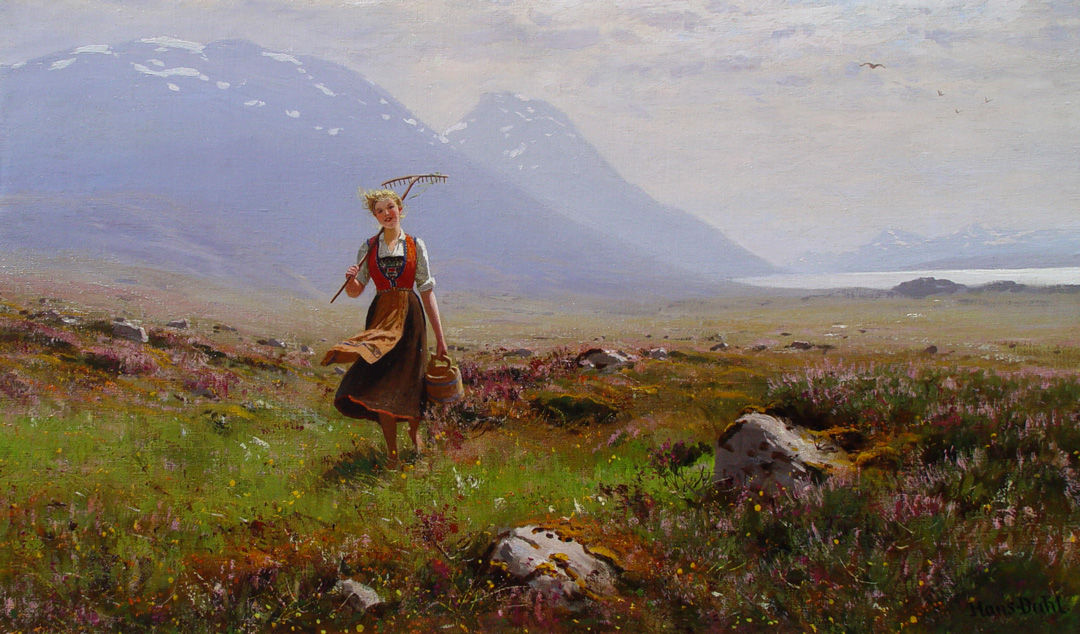
Sommerwind

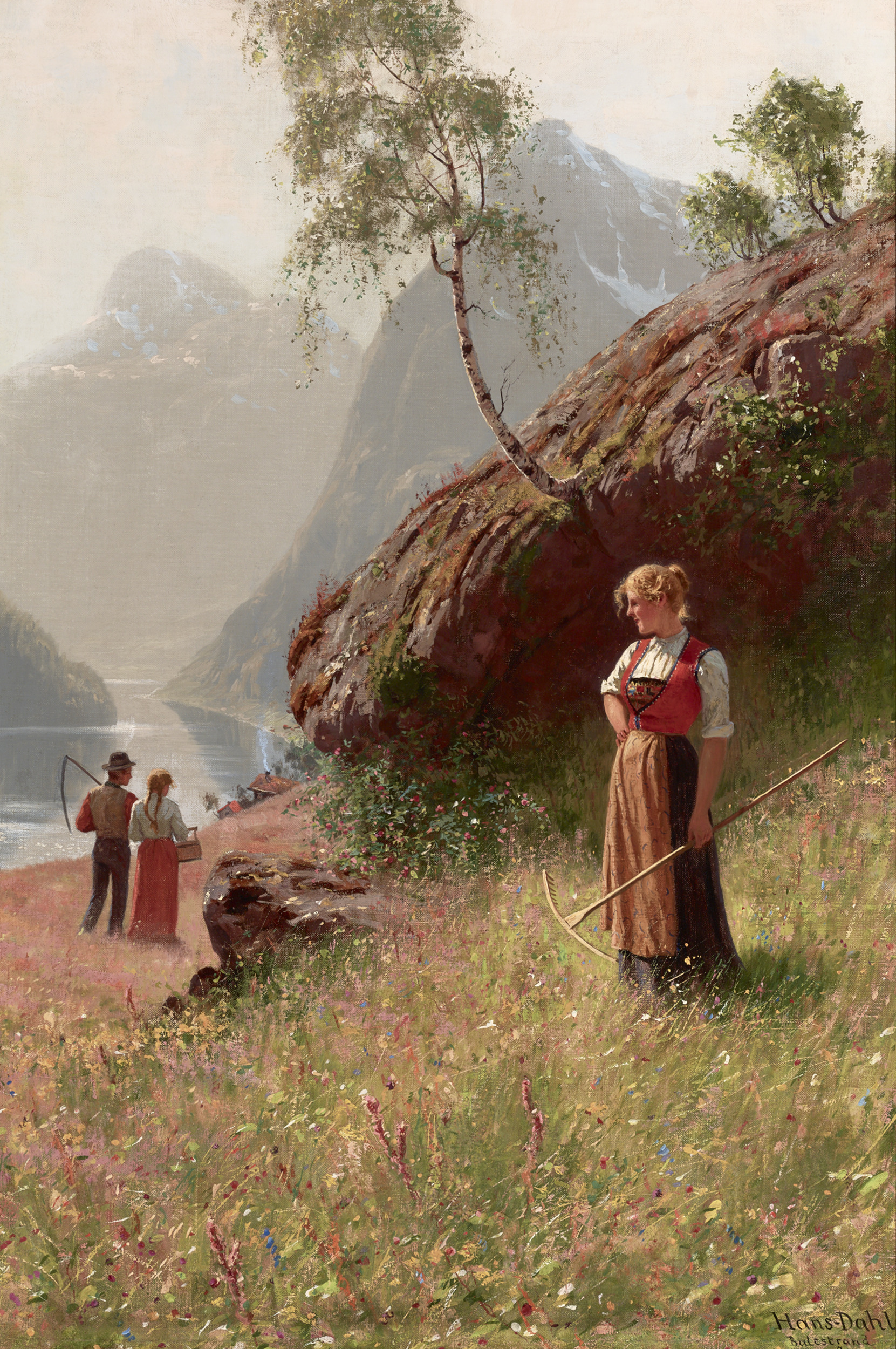
On the Fjord
