= Johanneson =

Johanneson is a Nordic surname. Notable people with the surname include:

- Albert Johanneson (1940–1995), one of the first high-profile black players, of any nationality, to play top-flight football in England
- Anders Johanneson Bøyum (1890–1962), Norwegian politician for the Liberal Party
- Carl Johanneson (born 1978), British professional boxer
