= Dragsviki =

Village in Sogndal Municipality, Norway

Dragsviki Dragsvik Tjugum
- Village
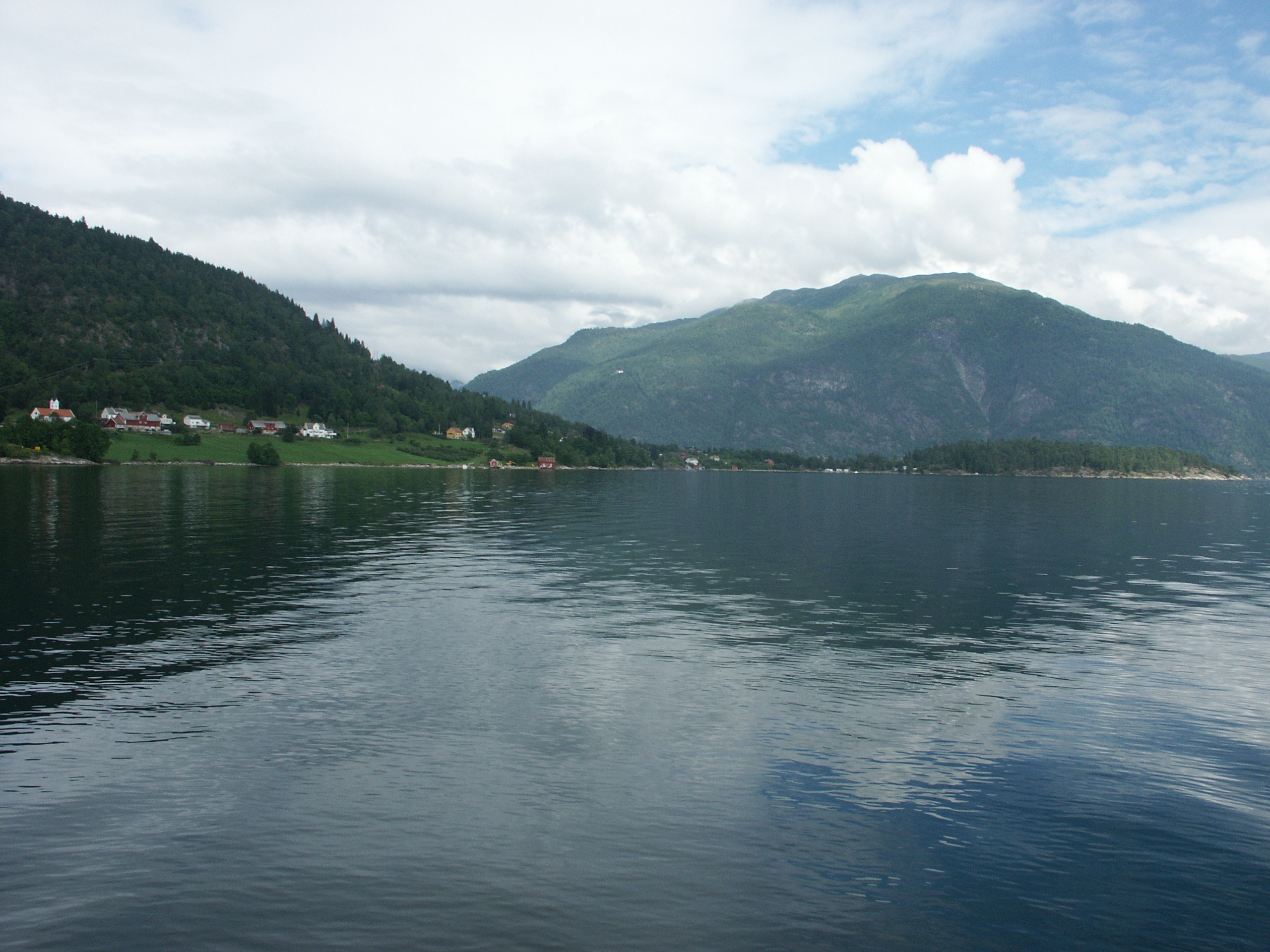
- View of the village
- Interactive map of Dragsviki; Dragsvik
- Location within Vestland Location within Norway
- Coordinates: 61.215857°N 5.562141°E
- Country: Norway
- Region: Western Norway
- County: Vestland
- District: Sogn
- Municipality: Sogndal Municipality
- Elevation: 27 m (89 ft)
- Time zone: UTC+01:00 (CET)
  - Summer (DST): UTC+02:00 (CEST)
- Post Code: 6899 Balestrand

Dragsviki is a village and ferry quay in Sogndal Municipality in Vestland county, Norway. The village is located on the northern shore of the Sognefjorden, at the mouths of the Esefjorden to the south/west and Fjærlandsfjorden to the north/east. It is located about 1 kilometre (0.62 mi) north of the village of Balestrand.

The village area sits along Norwegian County Road 55, where the Norwegian National Road 13 crosses the Sognefjorden by car ferry.

The western edge of the village is a farm area called Tjugum. Tjugum is the site of Tjugum Church.
