= Trygve Heltveit =

Norwegian philologist (1913–1985)

Harald Trygve Heltveit (8 December 1913 – 21 August 1985) was a Norwegian philologist.

He was born in Balestrand Municipality as a son of teacher Olav Heltveit (1873–1959) and Petra Sættevik (1878–1947). In 1943 he married Erna Røisum.

He became a student in 1936 and graduated with the cand.philol. degree from the University of Oslo in 1942. He was hired as a school teacher at Vestheim School in 1943 and Sinsen School in 1952, but received a research fellowship in 1947 and took the dr.philos. degree in 1954 with the thesis Studies in English Demonstrative Pronouns. He was hired as a lecturer in 1954, was promoted to docent in 1962 and professor in 1970. His field was English philology. He retired in 1981 and died in 1985 and was buried at Vestre gravlund.
