= Clemens Bewer =

German painter

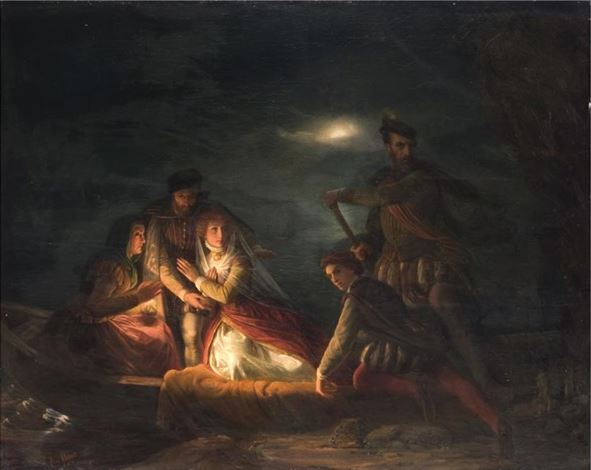
Mary Stuart's Escape from Loch Leven Castle, 1846

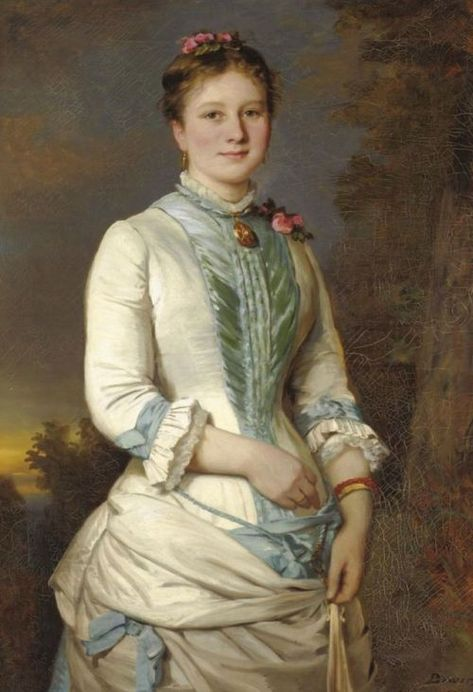
Portrait of a Lady with Pink Roses, 1883

Lambert Clemens Jakob Bewer (30 May 1820 – 2 September 1884) was a German history and portrait painter, in the Romantic style.

== Biography ==
He was born in Aachen. He began his art studies in the master class of Karl Ferdinand Sohn at the Kunstakademie Düsseldorf. In 1841, he continued his studies in Paris and Rome.

Working in the studios of Paul Delaroche, he acquired his knowledge of coloring technique, then learned copper engraving with Ary Scheffer. He was also required to make copies of works by the Old Masters, such as Raphael, Andrea del Sarto, Titian, Peter Paul Rubens, and Bartolomé Esteban Murillo, which were put to use in several small churches.

He returned to Düsseldorf in 1847, where he became associated with the Düsseldorfer Malerschule; a connection he would maintain for over thirty years. In addition to painting, he became a teacher at the Kunstakademie and was named a Professor there in 1869.

He was also a member of Malkasten (paintbox) and, in 1861, became a member of the commission charged with acquiring land for the Malkastenpark (also known as the Jacobigarten). He was elected chairman of the Kunstverein für die Rheinlande und Westfalen in 1864.

In 1876, he moved to Bonn, where he spent his retirement. His eldest son, Rudolf, pursued a legal career and became an Imperial Court Advisor. His youngest son, Max, was a writer and poet associated with the Völkisch movement. His daughter, Helene, married the Norwegian painter, Hans Dahl.

== Sources ==
- Bewer, Clemens. In: Hermann Alexander Müller: Biographisches Künstler-Lexikon. Verlag des Bibliographischen Instituts, Leipzig 1882, pg. 47 (Online)
- J. Fey: "Zur Geschichte Aachener Maler des 19. Jahrhunderts", In: Aus Aachens Vorzeit. Mitteilungen des Vereins für Kunde der Aachener Vorzeit. Zehnter Jahrgang 1897, Nr.4/8. pgs.79/80 (Online)
- Hackmann, Lisa: "Bewer, Clemens". In: Bénédicte Savoy und France Nerlich (Eds.): Pariser Lehrjahre. Ein Lexikon zur Ausbildung deutscher Maler in der französischen Hauptstadt. Vol. 1: 1793–1843, Walter de Gruyter, 2013, pgs.25–27 ISBN 978-3-11-029064-6
