= Esefjorden =

Fjord in Sogndal, Norway

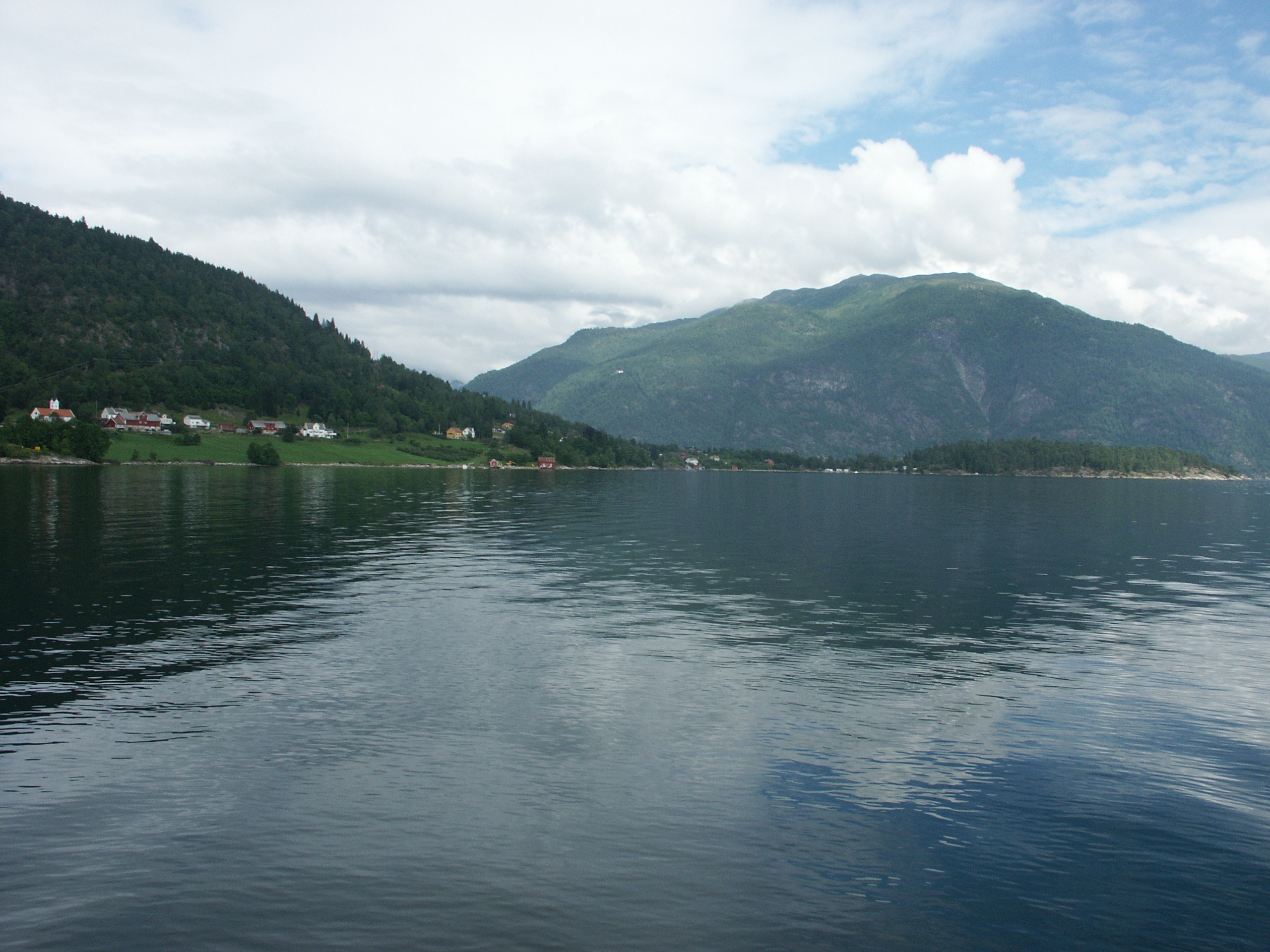
- View of Tjugum from Esefjorden
- Interactive map of the fjord
- Location: Vestland county, Norway
- Coordinates: 61.21688°N 6.50847°E
- Type: Fjord
- Primary outflows: Sognefjord
- Basin countries: Norway
- Max. length: 4 kilometres (2.5 mi)
- Max. width: 700 metres (2,300 ft)
- Settlements: Balestrand, Tjugum

Esefjorden is a fjord arm on the north side of the Sognefjord in Sogndal Municipality in Vestland county, Norway. The fjord is about 4 kilometres (2.5 mi) long and its mouth is just west of the mouth of the larger Fjærlandsfjorden. The village of Balestrand is located on the south side of the fjord, at the mouth. The village of Tjugum lies at the north side of the mouth of the fjord. At Dragsviki, just east of Tjugum, there are regular ferry connections to Hella (across the Fjærlandsfjorden) and on to Vangsnes in Vik Municipality. Tjugum Church is located on the shore of the Esefjorden, just east of Dragsviki. The Norwegian County Road 55 follows the shoreline of the fjord on both sides.

== See also ==
- List of Norwegian fjords
