= Anders Johanneson Bøyum =

Norwegian politician (1890–1962)

Anders Johanneson Bøyum (23 October 1890 – 22 April 1962) was a Norwegian politician for the Liberal Party.

He was born in Balestrand Municipality. He was elected to the Norwegian Parliament from Sogn og Fjordane in 1945, and was re-elected on three occasions. He had previously served in the position of deputy representative during the terms 1931–1933, 1934–1936 and 1937–1945.

Bøyum was a member of the executive committee of the municipal council for Balestrand Municipality from 1916 to 1934, and served as mayor in 1934–1937, 1937–1941 and 1945–1947. He was also a member of Sogn og Fjordane county council from 1934 to 1941 and 1945 to 1947.
