= Balestrand (village) =

Village in Sogndal Municipality, Norway

- Village
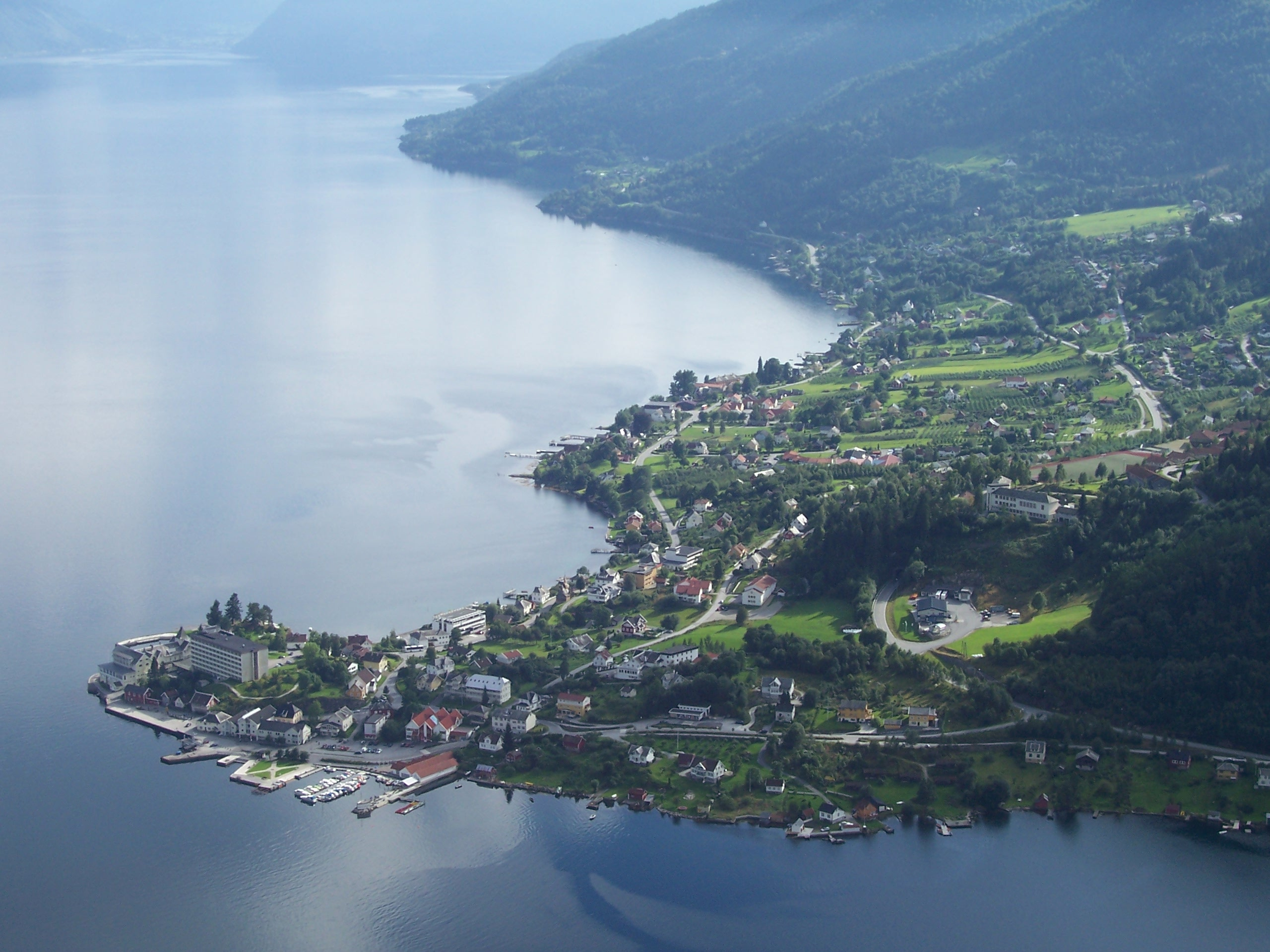
- View of the village (looking south)
- Interactive map of Balestrand
- Location within Vestland Location within Norway
- Coordinates: 61.20962°N 6.53608°E
- Country: Norway
- Region: Western Norway
- County: Vestland
- District: Sogn
- Municipality: Sogndal Municipality

Area
  - Total: 1.1 km^{2} (0.42 sq mi)
- Elevation: 7 m (23 ft)

Population (2025)
  - Total: 785
  - Density: 714/km^{2} (1,850/sq mi)
- Time zone: UTC+01:00 (CET)
  - Summer (DST): UTC+02:00 (CEST)
- Post Code: 6899 Balestrand

Balestrand- (locally called Holmen) is a village in Sogndal Municipality in Vestland county, Norway. The village is located on the northern shore of the Sognefjorden, at the mouth of the small Esefjorden. It sits about 20 kilometres (12 mi) west of the village area of Leikanger-Hermansverk and about 7 kilometres (4.3 mi) northwest of the village of Vangsnes (on the southern shore of the Sognefjorden). The small village of Dragsviki lies about 1 kilometre (0.62 mi) northeast of Balestrand, across the Esefjorden. The local Tjugum Church is located there, serving the people of the village of Balestrand.

The 1.1-square-kilometre (270-acre) village has a population (2025) of 785 and a population density of 714 inhabitants per square kilometre (1,850/sq mi).

The village was the administrative centre of the old Balestrand Municipality until 2020. It is also a major tourist stop since the 1800s with several hotels including the Kviknes Hotel. The Sognefjord Aquarium and The Norwegian Museum of Travel and Tourism are located in the village. There are ferry routes each summer from Balestrand to the Fjærlandsfjorden and to the village of Flåm. There is also fast boat service from Balestrand to the city of Bergen. Balholm AS, a fruit juice processing company is based in Balestrand.

== Name ==
The compounded name Balestrand was created by the Norwegian writer Henrik Wergeland as he traveled in Sogn in 1832 and wrote the poem "Framnæs-Balestrand". The first element is the name of the old farm Bale (Old Norse: Bali) and the last element is "strand" (Old Norse: strönd) which means "beach". The name of the farm is identical with the word bali which means "hillside along a beach". Historically, the village area was also known as Balholm or simply Holmen.

== Media gallery ==
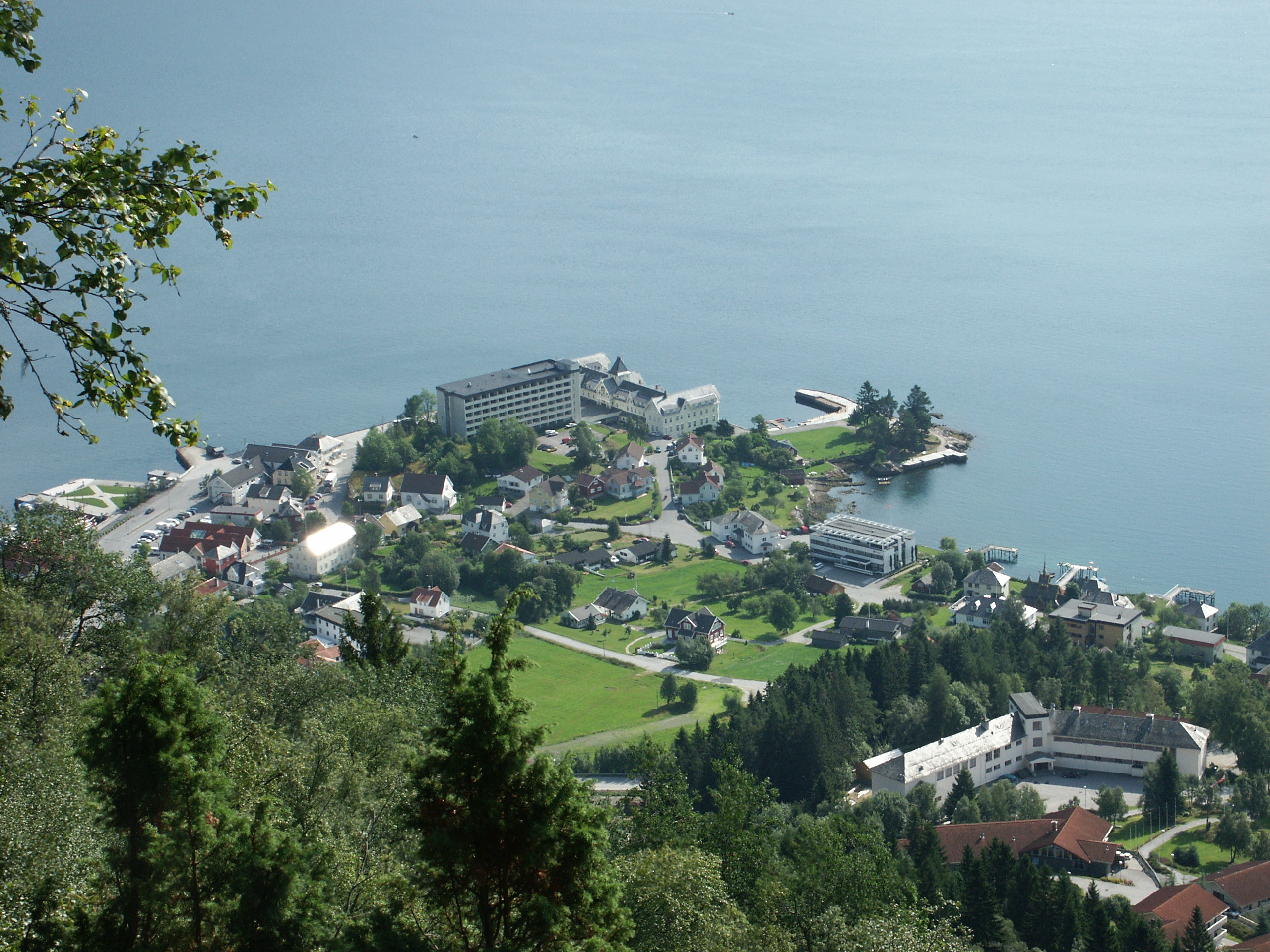
Looking at Balestrand from the mountain above

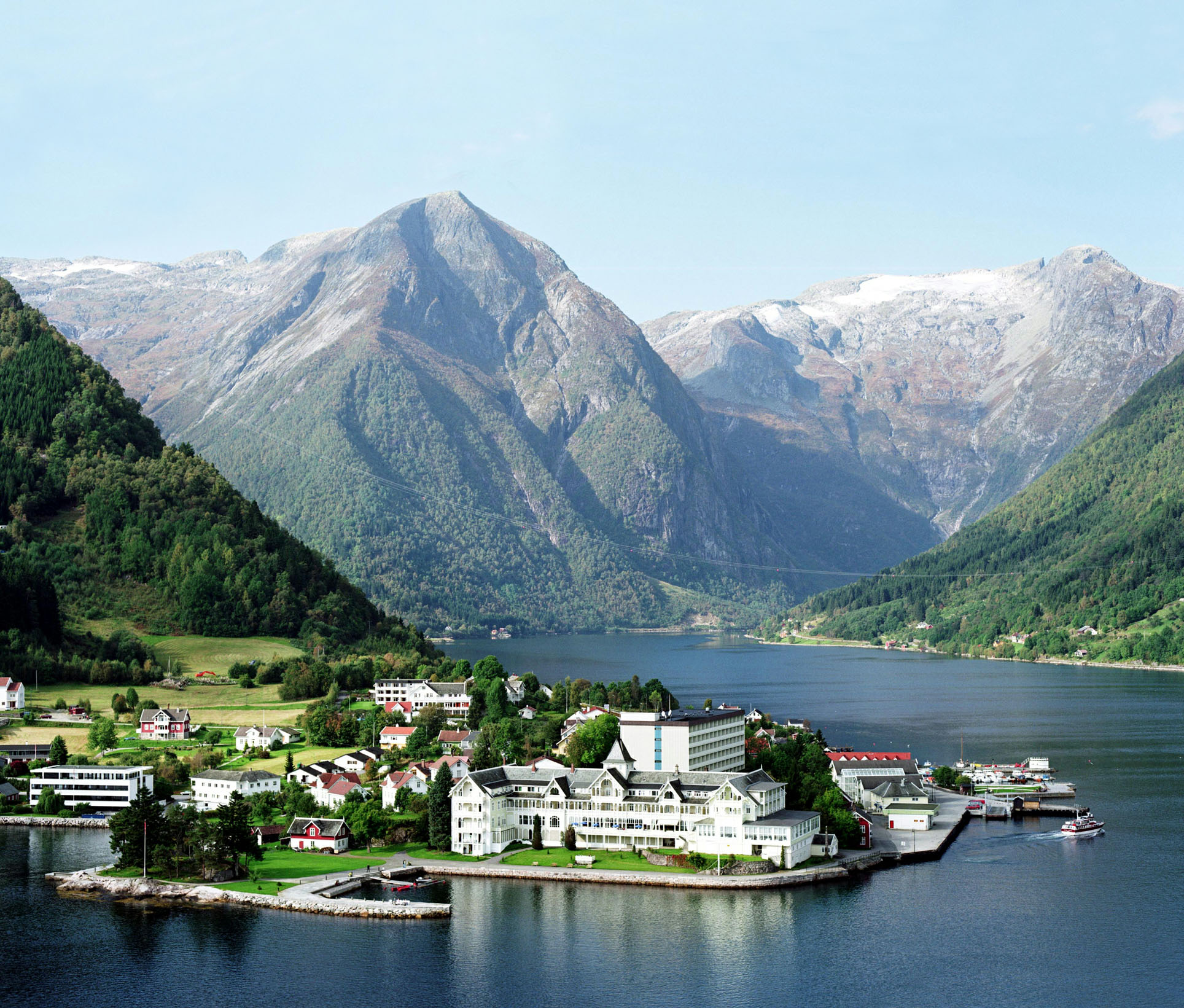
Kviknes Hotel along the water in downtown Balestrand

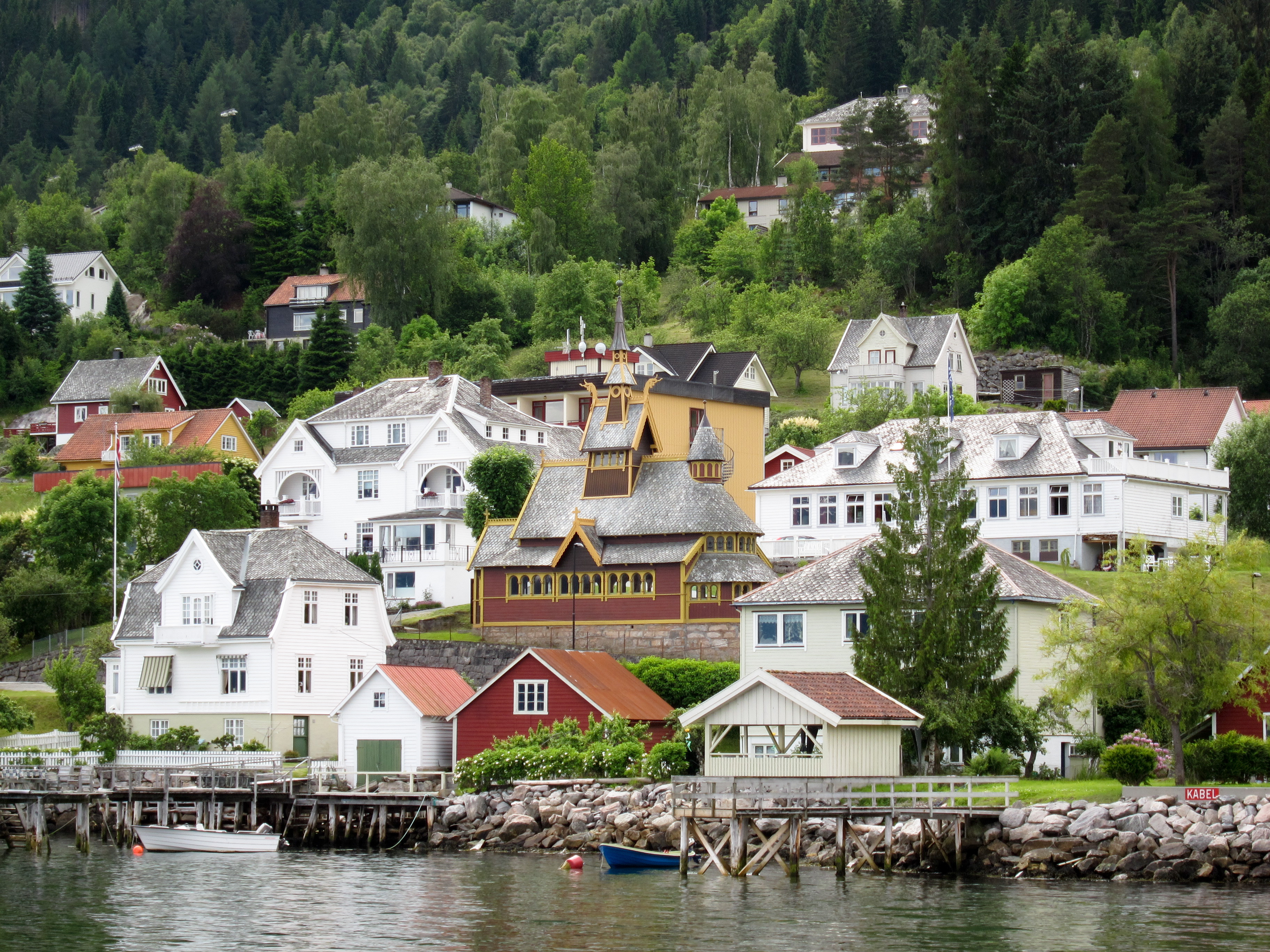
View of Balestrand, including the English Church

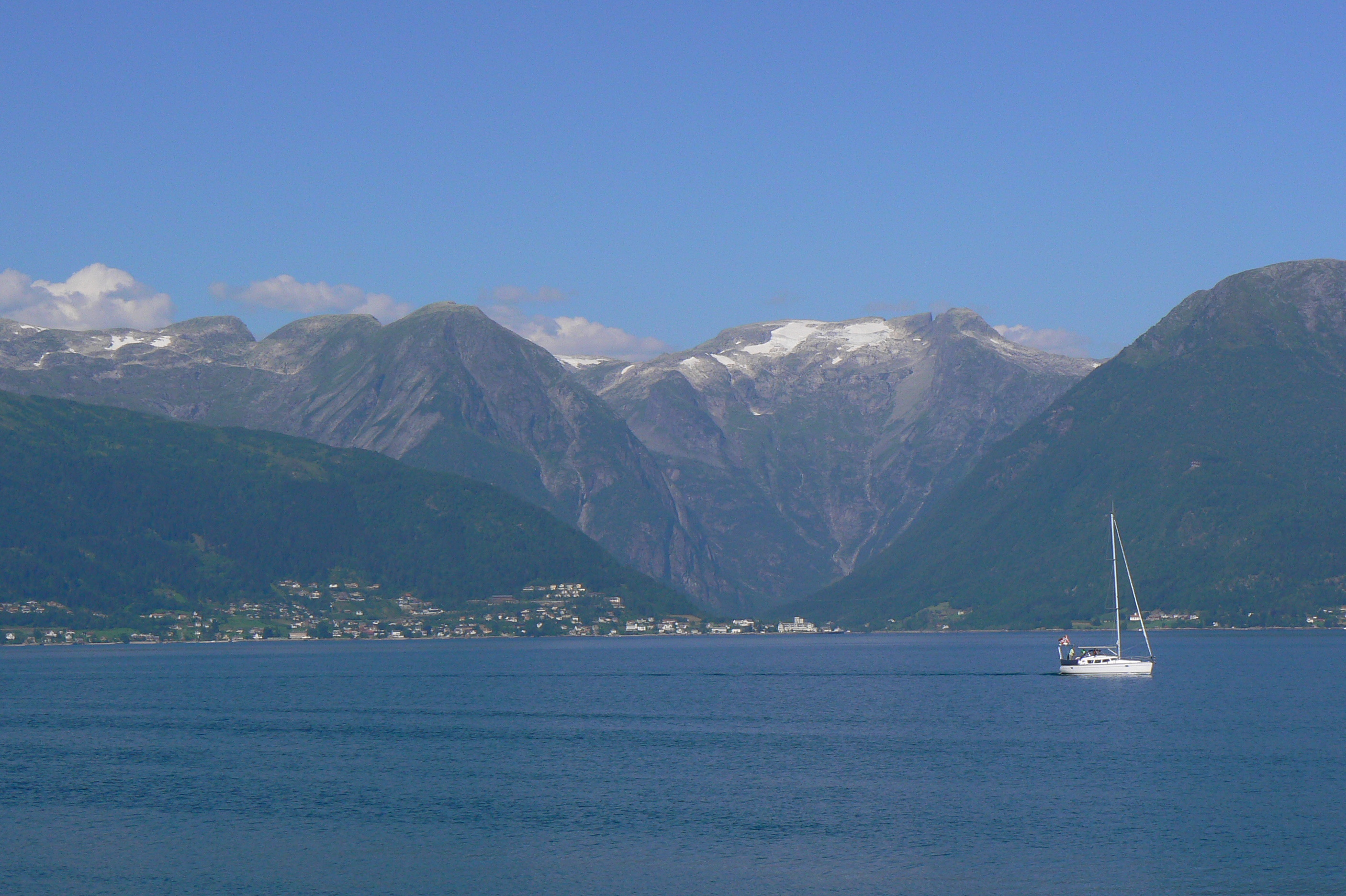
View from the fjord, looking north

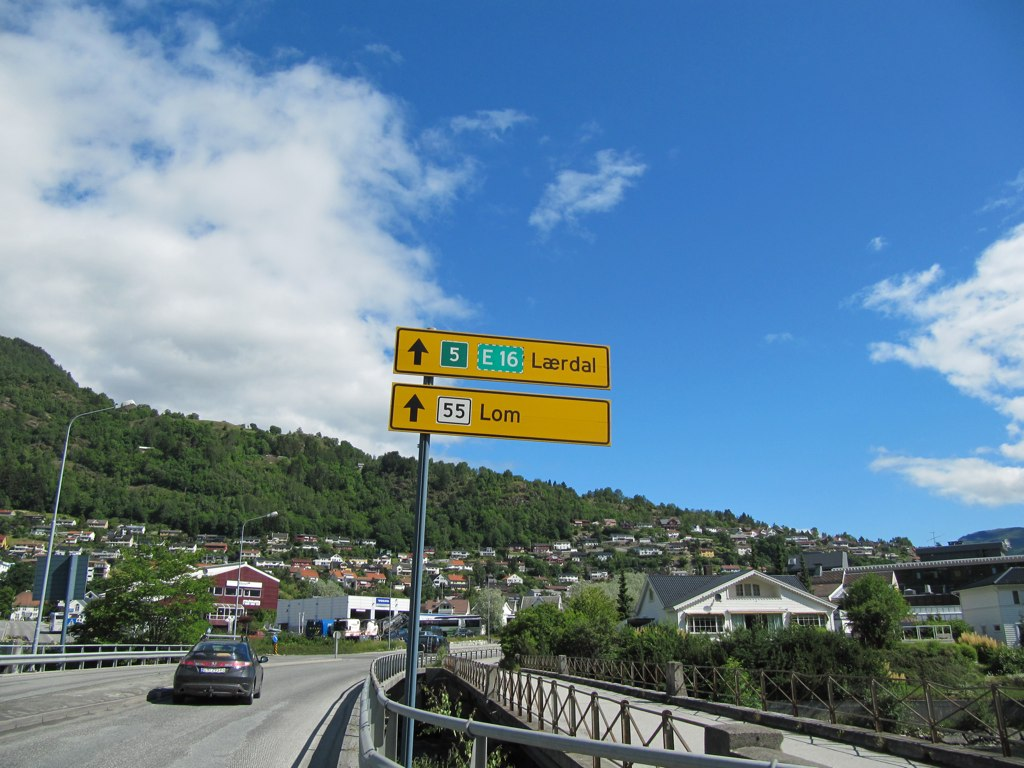
View of the main road leading through Balestrand
