= Tjugum Church =

Church in Vestland, Norway

- Tjugum kyrkje
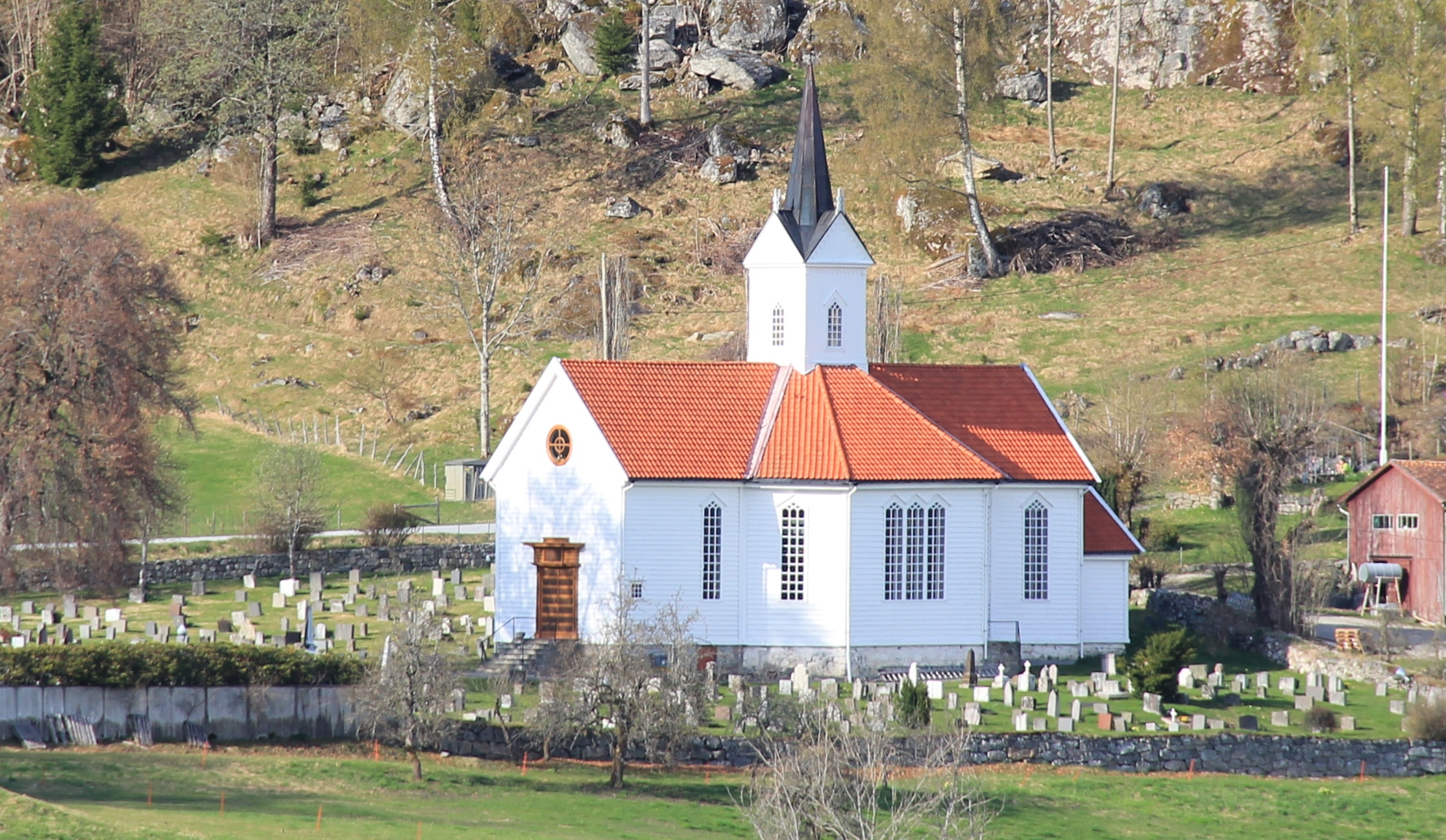
- View of the church
- Tjugum Church
- 61°12′55″N 6°32′38″E
- Location: Sogndal Municipality, Vestland
- Country: Norway
- Denomination: Church of Norway
- Previous denomination: Catholic Church
- Churchmanship: Evangelical Lutheran

History
- Status: Parish church
- Founded: 12th century
- Consecrated: 29 October 1863

Architecture
- Functional status: Active
- Architect: Christian Heinrich Grosch
- Architectural type: Octagonal
- Completed: 1863 (163 years ago)

Specifications
- Capacity: 320
- Materials: Wood

Administration
- Diocese: Bjørgvin bispedømme
- Deanery: Sogn prosti
- Parish: Balestrand
- Norwegian Cultural Heritage Site
- Type: Church
- Status: Listed
- ID: 85636

Tjugum Church (Norwegian: Tjugum kyrkje) is a parish church of the Church of Norway in Sogndal Municipality in Vestland county, Norway. It is located just outside the village of Balestrand. It is one of two churches for the Balestrand parish which is part of the Sogn prosti (deanery) in the Diocese of Bjørgvin. The white, wooden church was built in an octagonal design in 1863 using plans drawn up by the architect Christian Henrik Grosch. The church seats about 320 people.

== History ==
The earliest existing historical records of the church date back to the year 1323, but it was not new that year. The first church in Tjugum was a wooden stave church that was likely built during the 12th century. In 1610, the old church was torn down and replaced by a new timber-framed long church. The timber church from 1610 is shown in a painting from 1839 (see media gallery below). The nave of the church measured about 10.4 by 8.2 metres (34 ft × 27 ft) and the choir measured about 5.3 by 6.6 metres (17 ft × 22 ft). In 1696–1698, a 6.3-by-4.4-metre (21 ft × 14 ft) sacristy was added to the east of the choir.

This church was part of the parish of Leikanger Municipality until 1 March 1849 when a new parish was established for the new Balestrand Municipality which was established in 1850. Tjugum Church was to be the main church for the parish, so a new, larger church was commissioned to be built. So in 1863, the old church was torn down and replaced by a new octagonal church on the same site. The new church was designed by Christian Henrik Grosch and the lead builder was Johannes Øvsthus. The new building was consecrated on 29 October 1863 by the local Dean Thomas Erichsen. In 1940, the church porch was enlarged and the second floor seating gallery was reduced in size.

== Media gallery ==
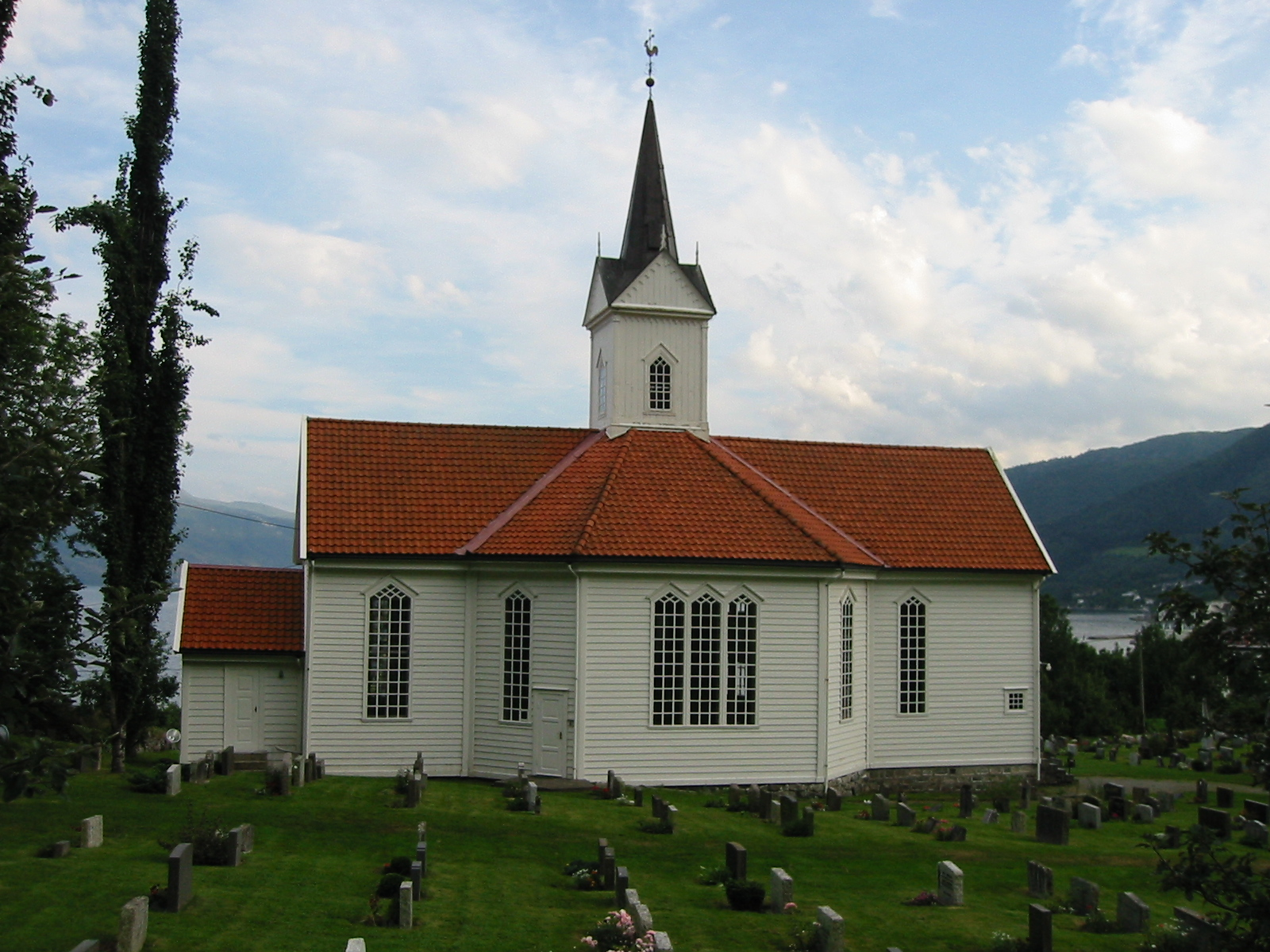
Exterior of the church

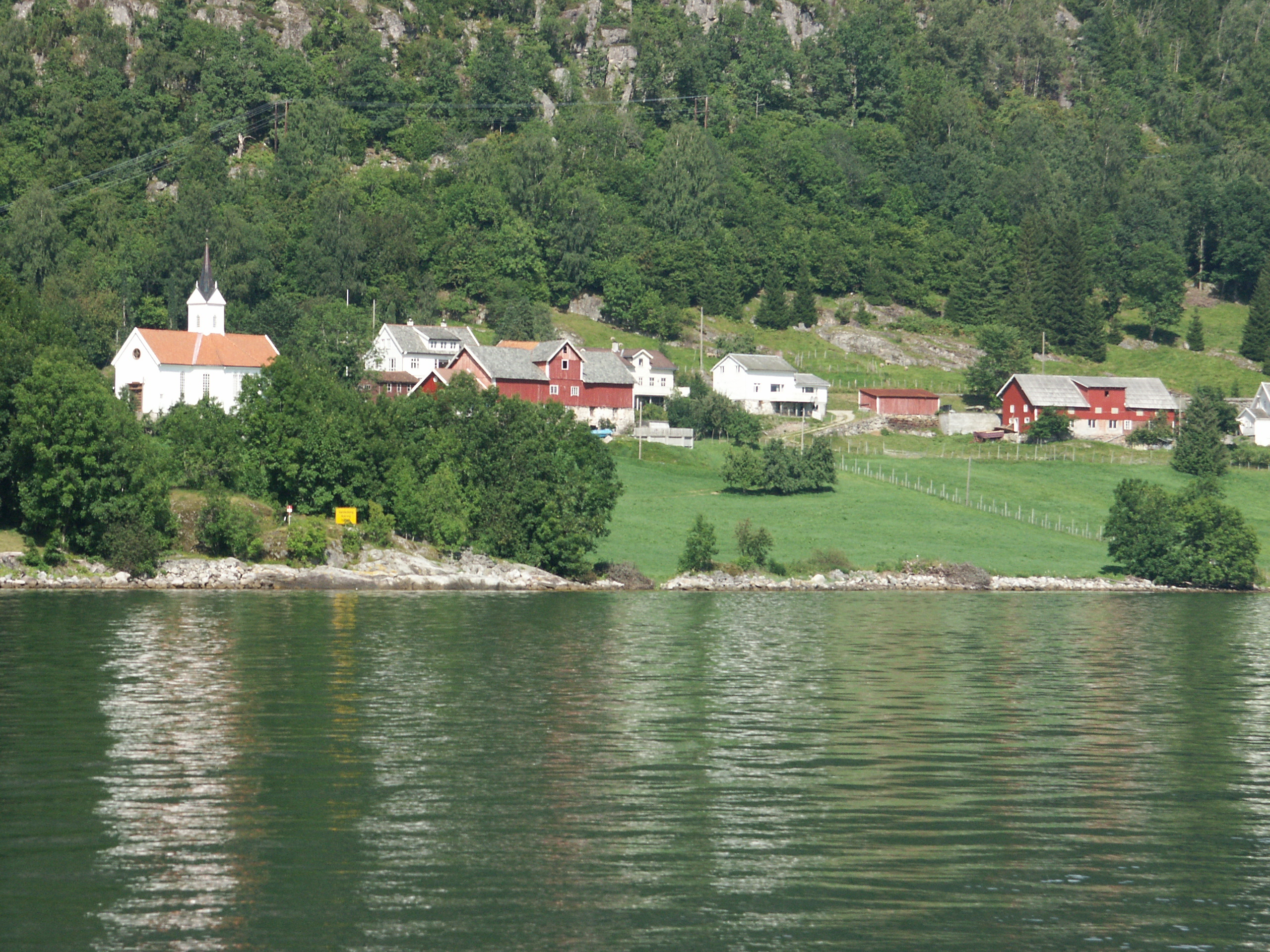
View from a distance

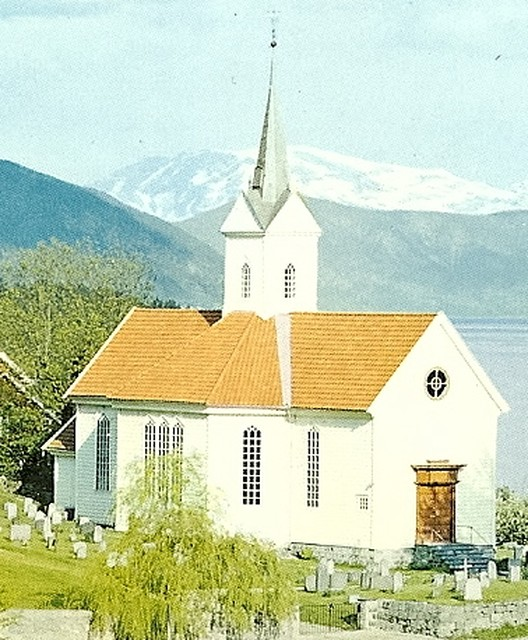
View of the front

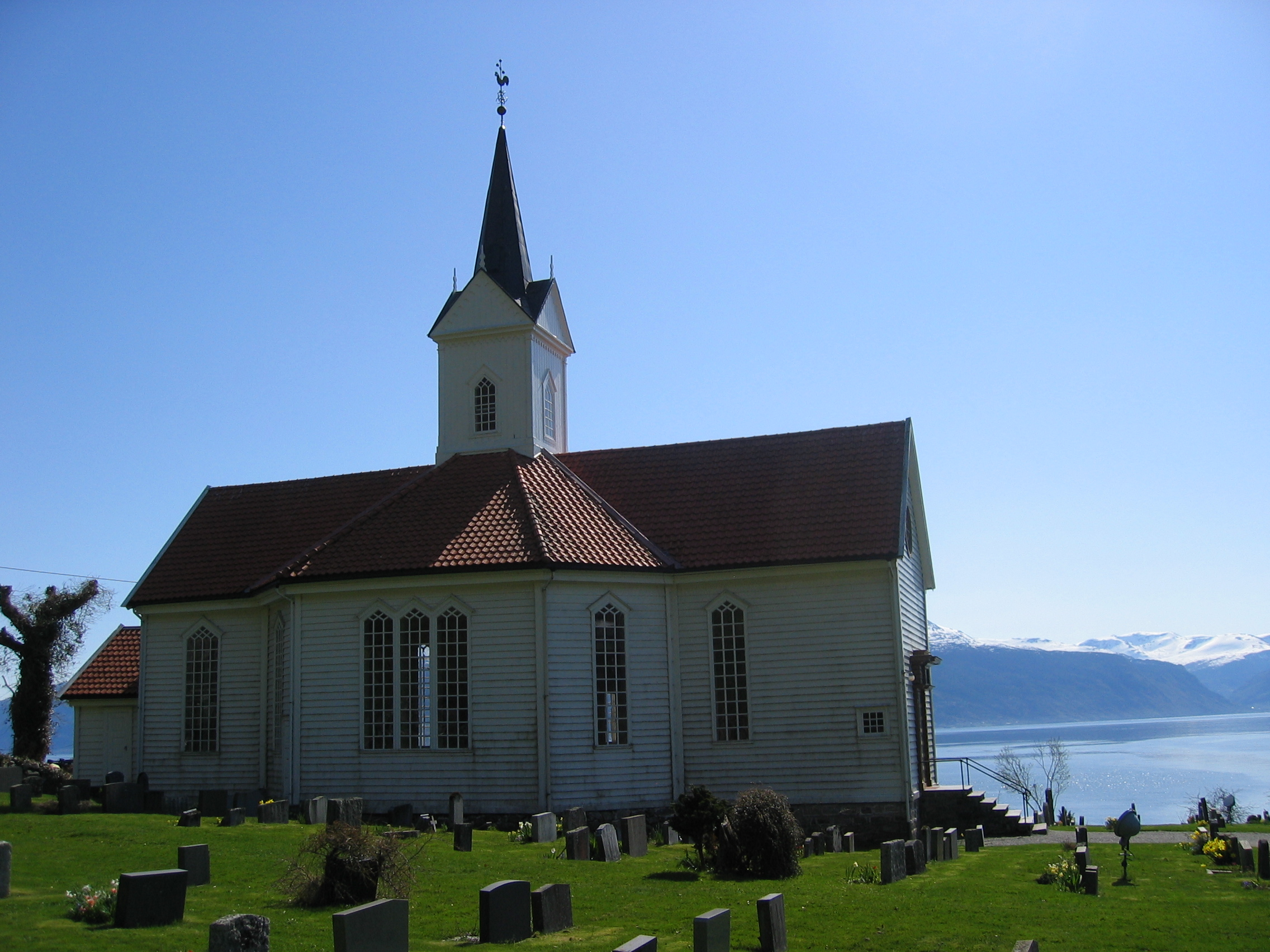
Another view of the exterior

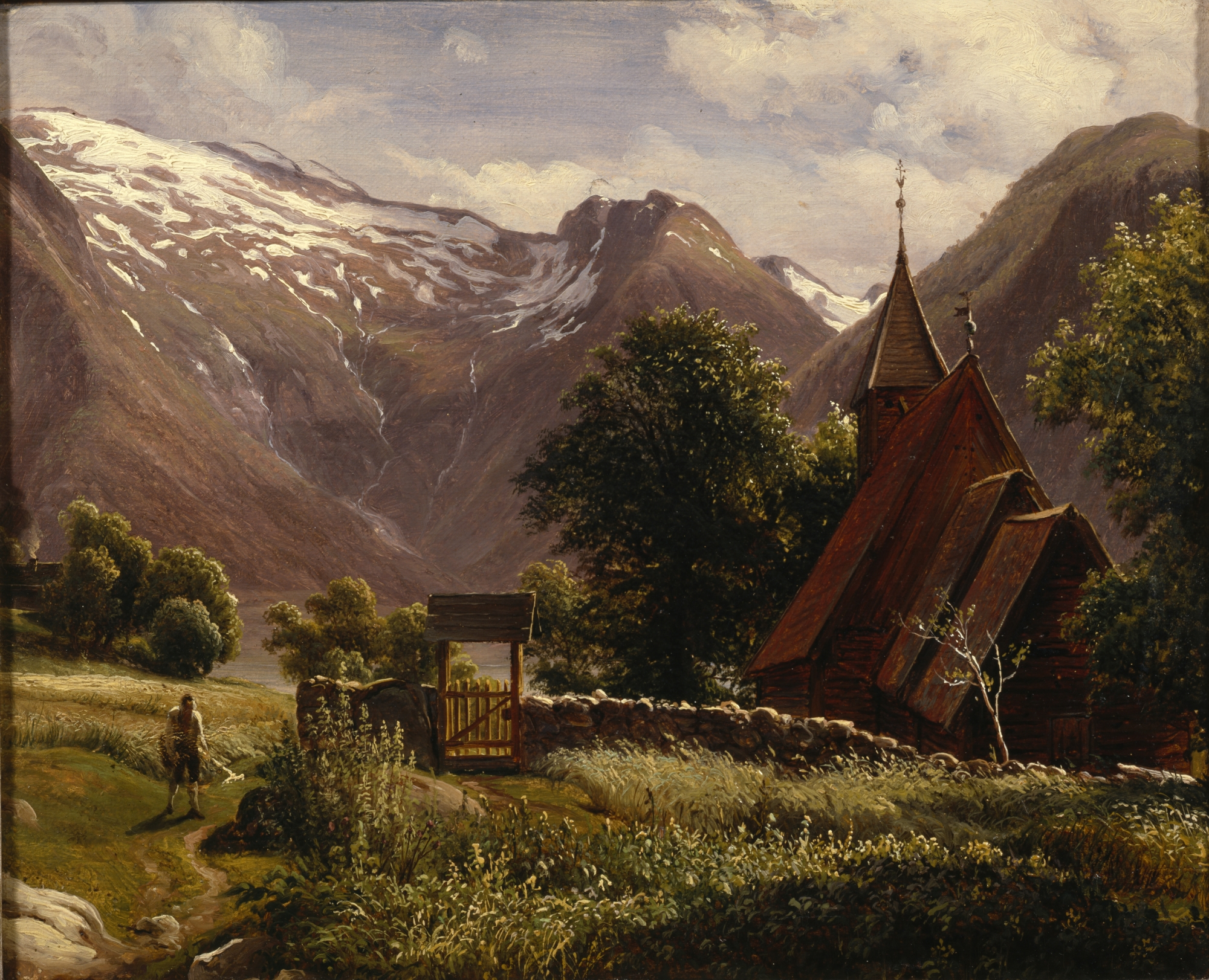
View of the previous church (1839)

== See also ==
- List of churches in Bjørgvin
