= Fjærland Tunnel =

Road tunnel in Vestland, Norway

Fjærland Tunnel Fjærlandstunnelen
- Interactive map of Fjærland Tunnel; Fjærlandstunnelen

Overview
- Location: Vestland, Norway
- Coordinates: 61.4906°N 6.7011°E
- Status: In use
- Route: Rv5
- Start: Lunde
- End: Fjærland

Operation
- Traffic: Automotive

Technical
- Length: 6,397 metres (20,988 ft)
- No. of lanes: 2

The Fjærland Tunnel (Norwegian: Fjærlandstunnelen) is a 6,397-metre (3.975 mi) long road tunnel in Vestland county, Norway. The tunnel opened on 31 May 1986 and it is part of Norwegian National Road 5. The opening ceremony was led by former US vice president Walter Mondale who has family connections to Fjærland.

The tunnel connects the village of Lunde in Sunnfjord Municipality and the village of Fjærland in Sogndal Municipality. The tunnel goes through mountains in the Jostedalsbreen National Park which lies between the two villages. The Marabreen glacier sits high above the tunnel.

The village area of Fjærland was only accessible by boat on the Fjærlandsfjorden until 1986 when this tunnel opened. Then in 1995, the Frudal Tunnel opened which continued National Road 5 from Fjærland all the way to Sogndalsfjøra.
