= Fjærland Church =

Church in Vestland, Norway

- Fjærland kyrkje
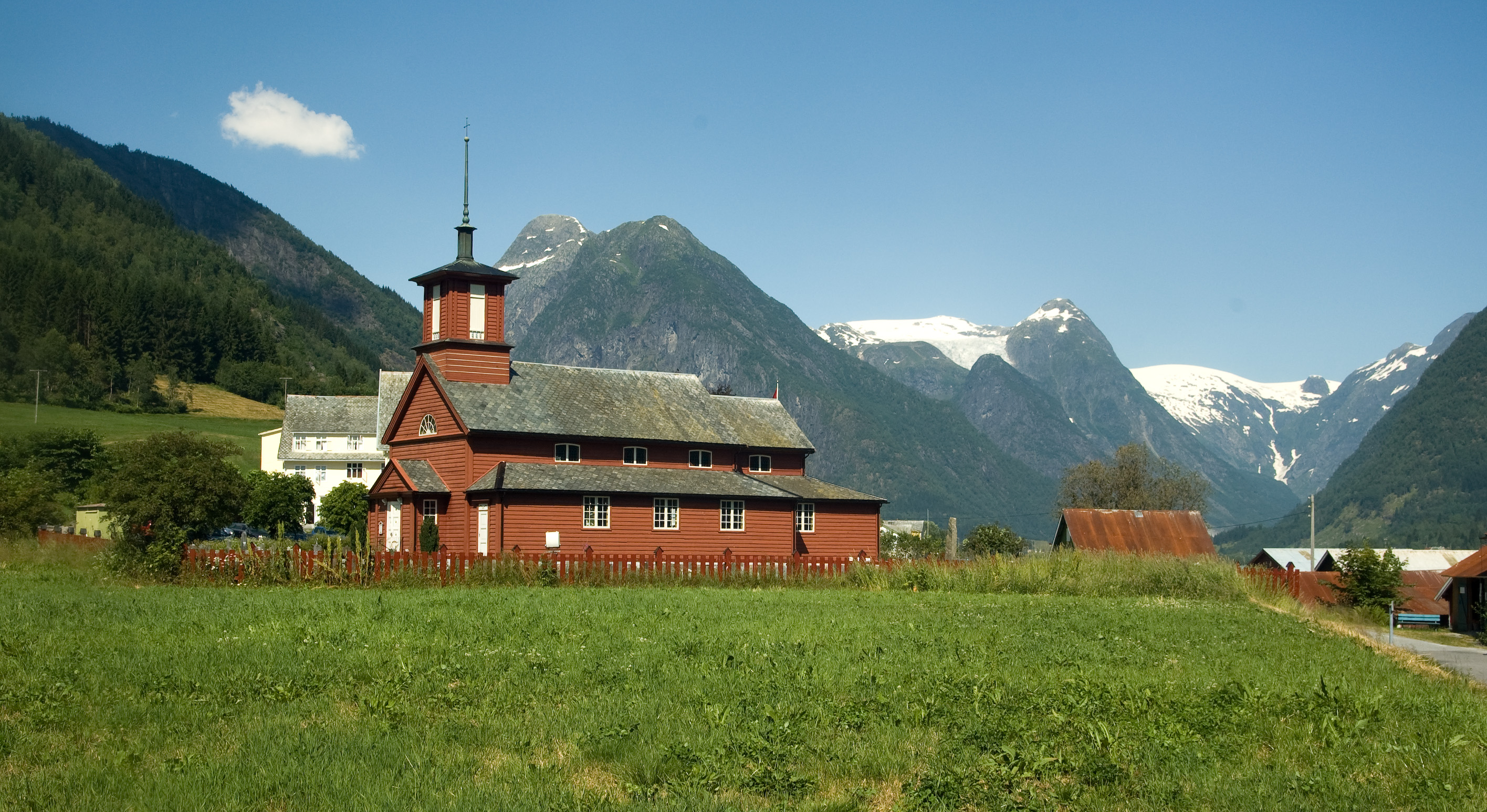
- View of the church
- Fjærland Church
- 61°24′13″N 6°44′23″E
- Location: Sogndal Municipality, Vestland
- Country: Norway
- Denomination: Church of Norway
- Previous denomination: Catholic Church
- Churchmanship: Evangelical Lutheran

History
- Former name: Mundal kyrkje
- Status: Parish church
- Founded: 13th century
- Consecrated: 13 Aug 1931

Architecture
- Functional status: Active
- Architect: Christian Heinrich Grosch
- Architectural type: Long church
- Completed: 1861 (165 years ago)

Specifications
- Capacity: 300
- Materials: Wood

Administration
- Diocese: Bjørgvin bispedømme
- Deanery: Sogn prosti
- Parish: Fjærland
- Norwegian Cultural Heritage Site
- Type: Church
- Status: Listed
- ID: 84153

Fjærland Church (Norwegian: Fjærland kyrkje) is a parish church of the Church of Norway in Sogndal Municipality in Vestland county, Norway. It is located in the village of Fjærland, near the northern end of the Fjærlandsfjorden. It is the church for the Fjærland parish which is part of the Sogn prosti (deanery) in the Diocese of Bjørgvin. The white, wooden church was built in a long church design in 1861 using plans drawn up by the architect Christian Henrik Grosch. The church seats about 300 people.

== History ==
The earliest existing historical records of the church date back to the year 1306, but the church was not new that year. The first church at Fjærland was likely built in the 12th century and it was a wooden stave church. Historically, the church was also known as the Mundal Church. In 1610, the church was destroyed in a storm. A new timber-framed long church was built at Mundal to replace the old church. The building was described as a small church with a nave that measured about 10 by 7.5 metres (33 ft × 25 ft) and a choir that measured about 5 by 5 metres (16 ft × 16 ft). Inside, the church had twisted black and brown colored branches painted on the walls and the ceiling had a large painting of the sun, moon, and stars. Around 1680, a new church porch and tower were built on the west end. In 1861, the church was torn down to make room for the present church.

In 1931, the church was expanded and remodeled. The architect Johan Lindstrom was responsible for the major expansion of the church that year. During the renovation, the old steeple was removed and a spire with a cross on top was put in its place, giving the church a unique look. The church was consecrated again on 13 August 1931 by Bishop Andreas Fleischer after the renovations.

From ancient times the village had no road connections to the outside world. All transportation to and from the outside world took place via the Fjærlandsfjord. The first road into Fjærland to Skei in Jølster to the north was in 1986 and then a road and tunnel to Sogndalsfjøra to the south was completed in 1994. After a referendum in 2000, the village was transferred from Balestrand to Sogndal municipality. This also meant that the church switched from the Balestrand parish to the Sogndal parish.

== Media gallery ==
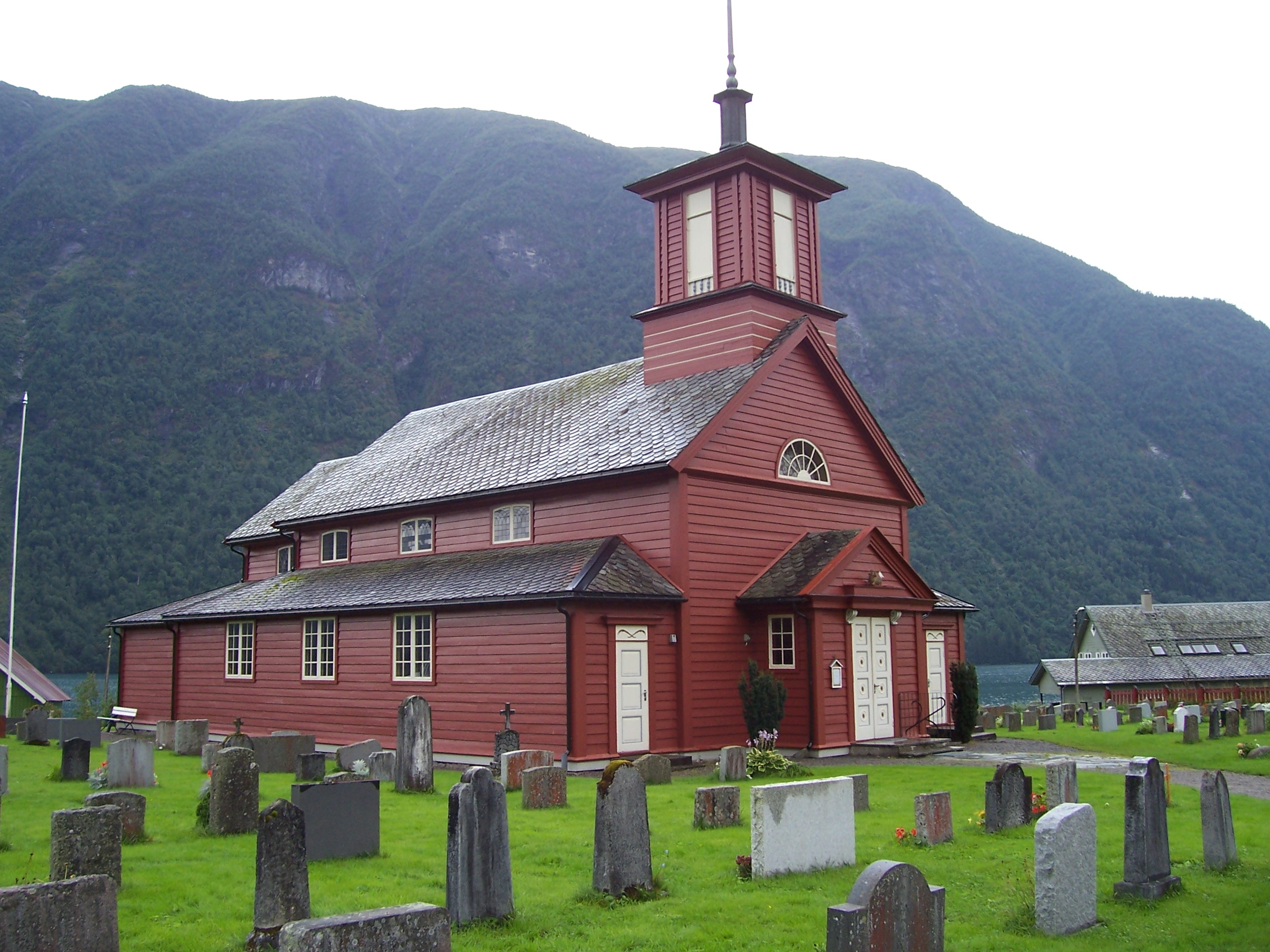
Exterior front

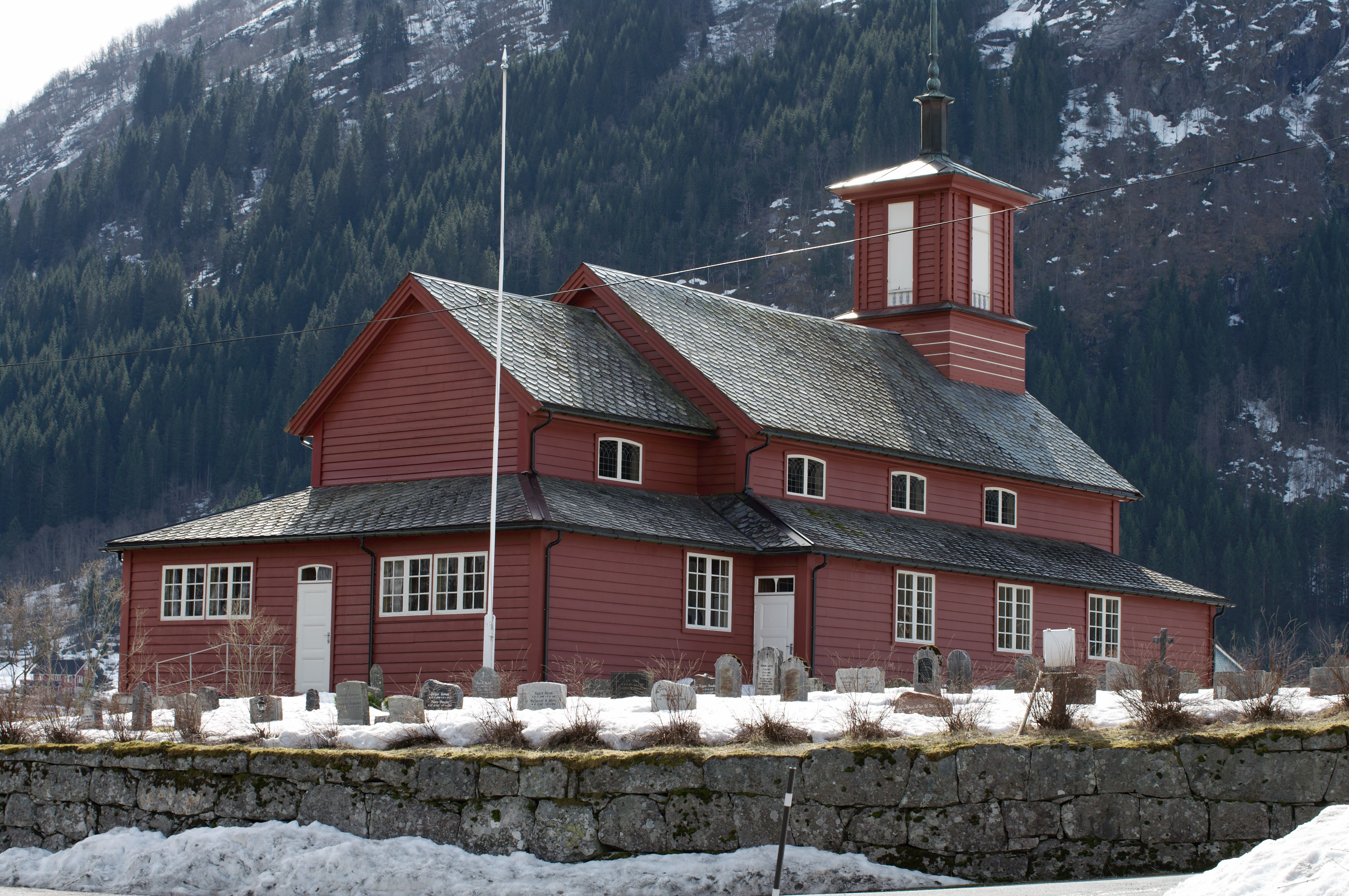
Exterior back

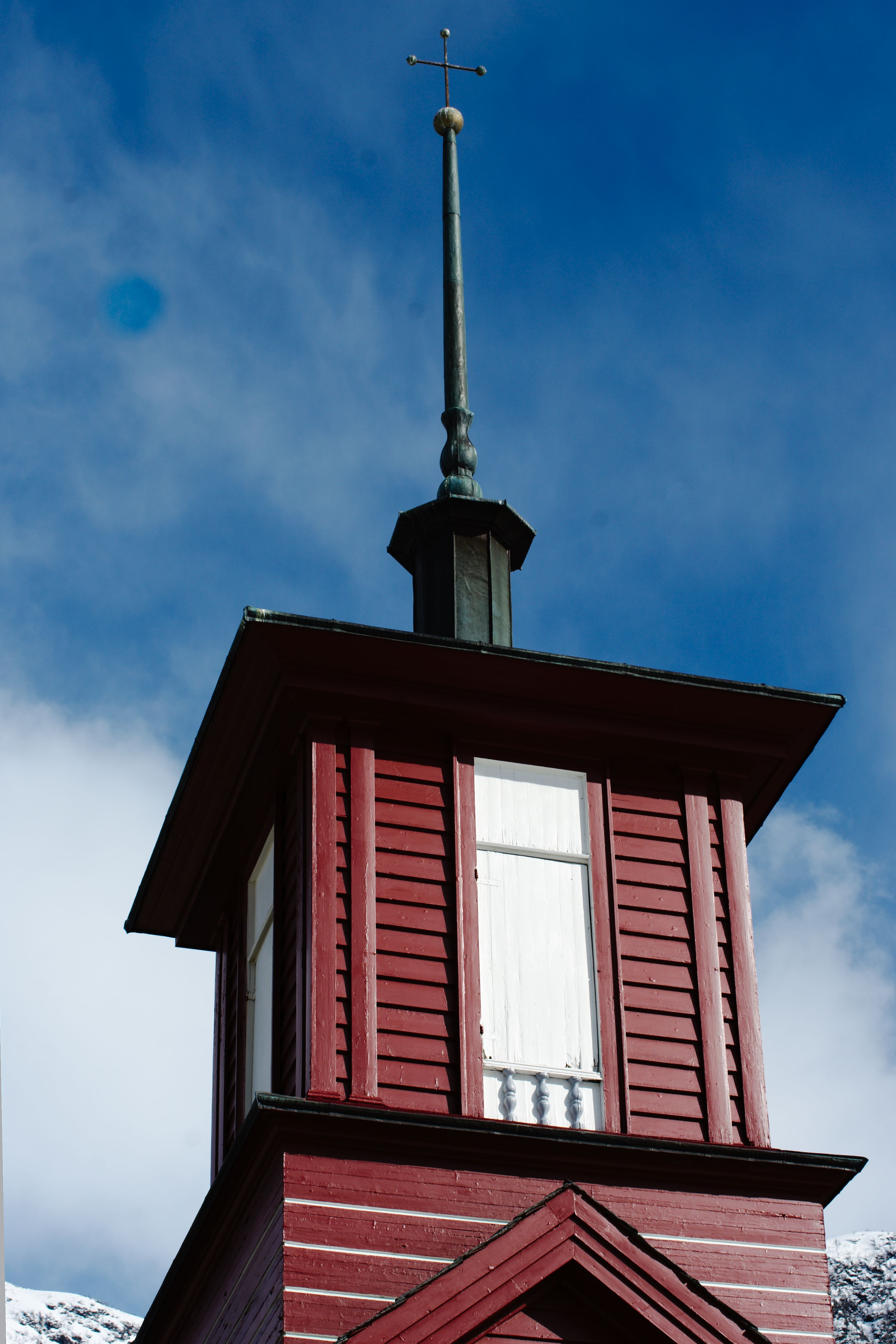
View of the spire

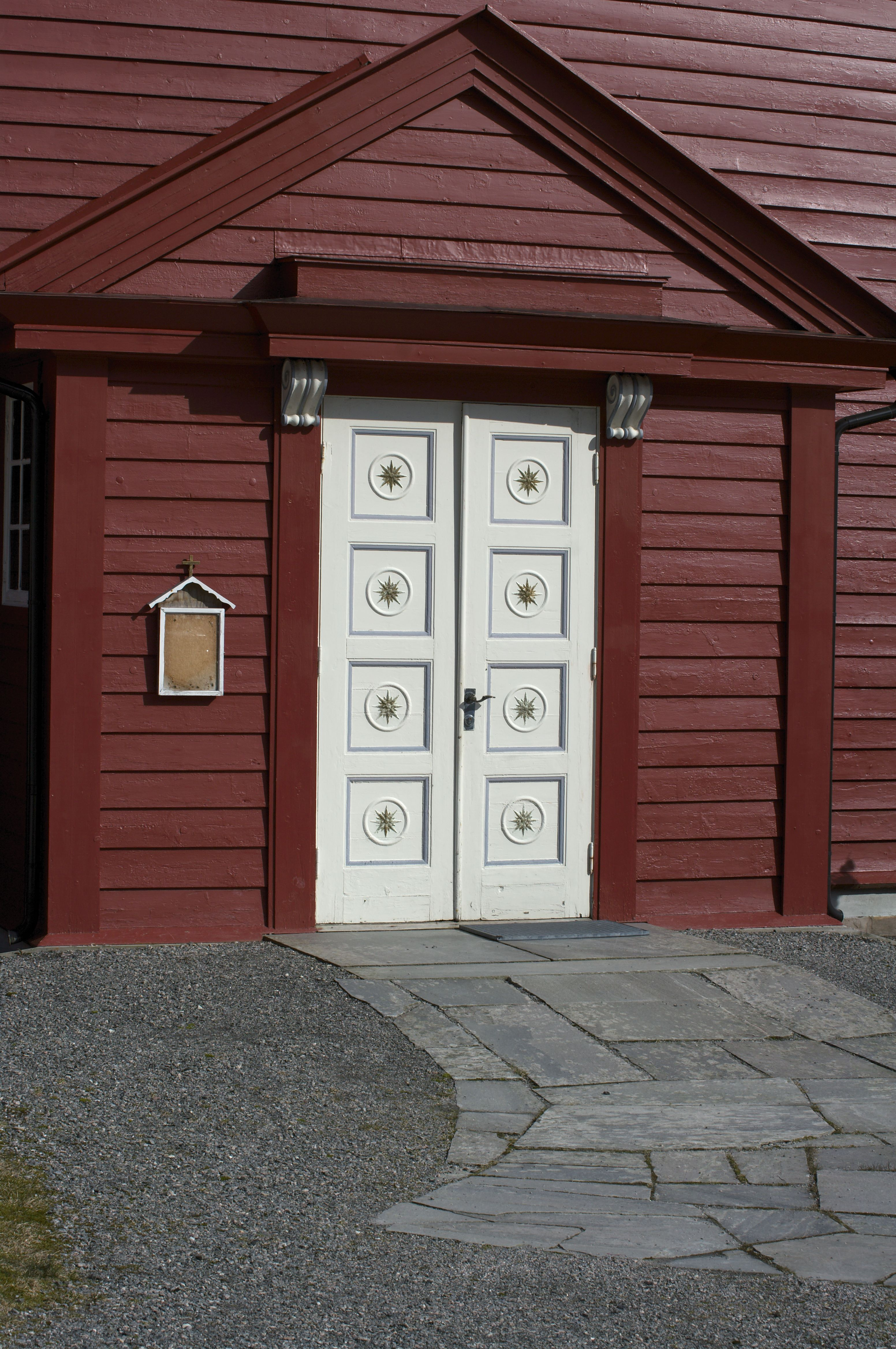
View of the main doors

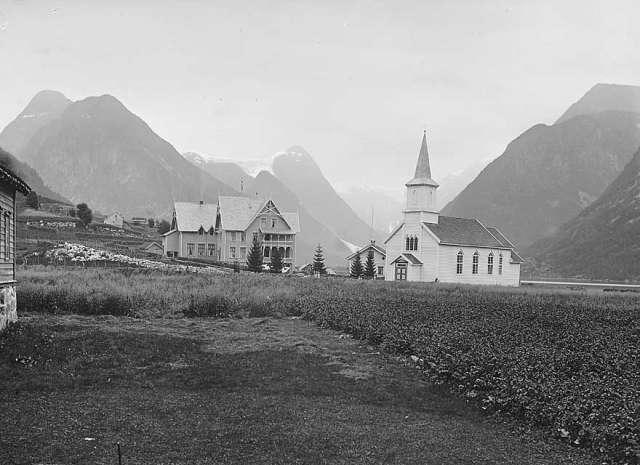
View of the church before the 1931 reconstruction

== See also ==
- List of churches in Bjørgvin
