= Kjørnes =

Village in Sogndal Municipality, Norway

- Village
- Interactive map of Kjørnes
- Location within Vestland Location within Norway
- Coordinates: 61.21328°N 7.12983°E
- Country: Norway
- Region: Western Norway
- County: Vestland
- District: Sogn
- Municipality: Sogndal Municipality

Area
  - Total: 0.42 km^{2} (0.16 sq mi)
- Elevation: 130 m (430 ft)

Population (2025)
  - Total: 959
  - Density: 2,283/km^{2} (5,910/sq mi)
- Time zone: UTC+01:00 (CET)
  - Summer (DST): UTC+02:00 (CEST)
- Post Code: 6856 Sogndal

Kjørnes is a small village area in Sogndal Municipality in Vestland County, Norway. It is located at the inner part of the Sogndalsfjorden, about 3.5 kilometres (2.2 mi) southeast of the village of Sogndalsfjøra and about 6.5 kilometres (4.0 mi) northwest of the village of Kaupanger.

Kjørnes is a suburb or bedroom community for the village of Sogndalsfjøra. The village area sits along Norwegian National Road 5 on the steep, forested, hill leading down to the shore of the fjord.

The 0.42-square-kilometre (100-acre) village has a population (2025) of 959 and a population density of 2,283 inhabitants per square kilometre (5,910/sq mi).
