= Supphellebreen =

Glacier in Vestland, Norway

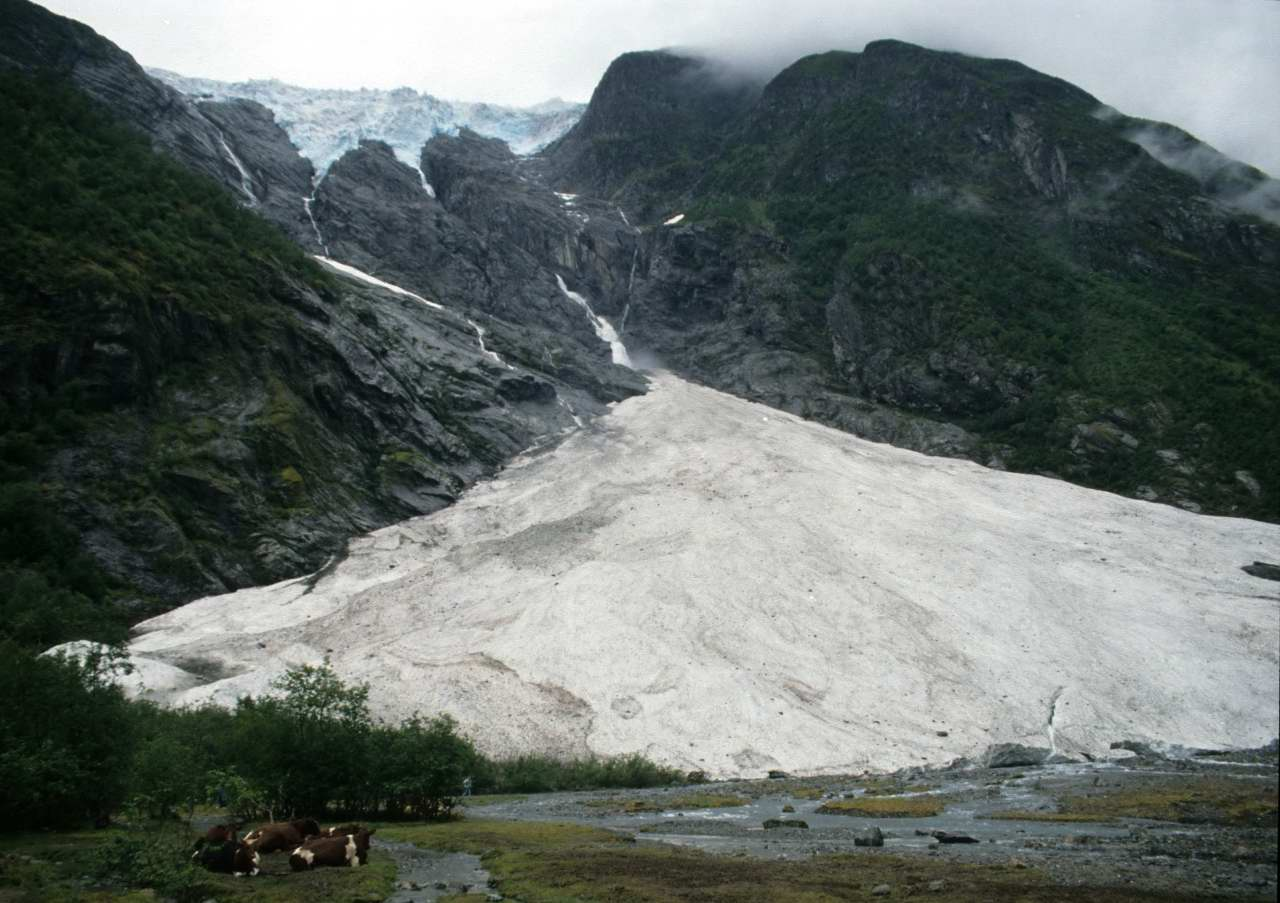
- View of the Supphellebreen
- Interactive map of the glacier
- Location: Vestland, Norway
- Coordinates: 61.51414°N 6.80479°E
- Lowest elevation: 60 metres (200 ft)

Supphellebreen is a glacier in the Fjærland area of Sogndal Municipality in Vestland county, Norway. It is located about 10 kilometres (6.2 mi) north of the village of Fjærland.

It is located inside Jostedalsbreen National Park. It is a side branch of the main Jostedalsbreen glacier. The glacier is split into an upper and a lower part, with a non-glaciated area between. The glacier reaches down to an elevation of 60 metres (200 ft) above sea level, the lowest glacier level in southern Norway. The Bøyabreen glacier lies just northwest of Supphellebreen.

== See also ==
- List of glaciers in Norway
