= Sogndal Municipality =

Municipality in Vestland, Norway

Sogndal Municipality Sogndal kommune
- Municipality
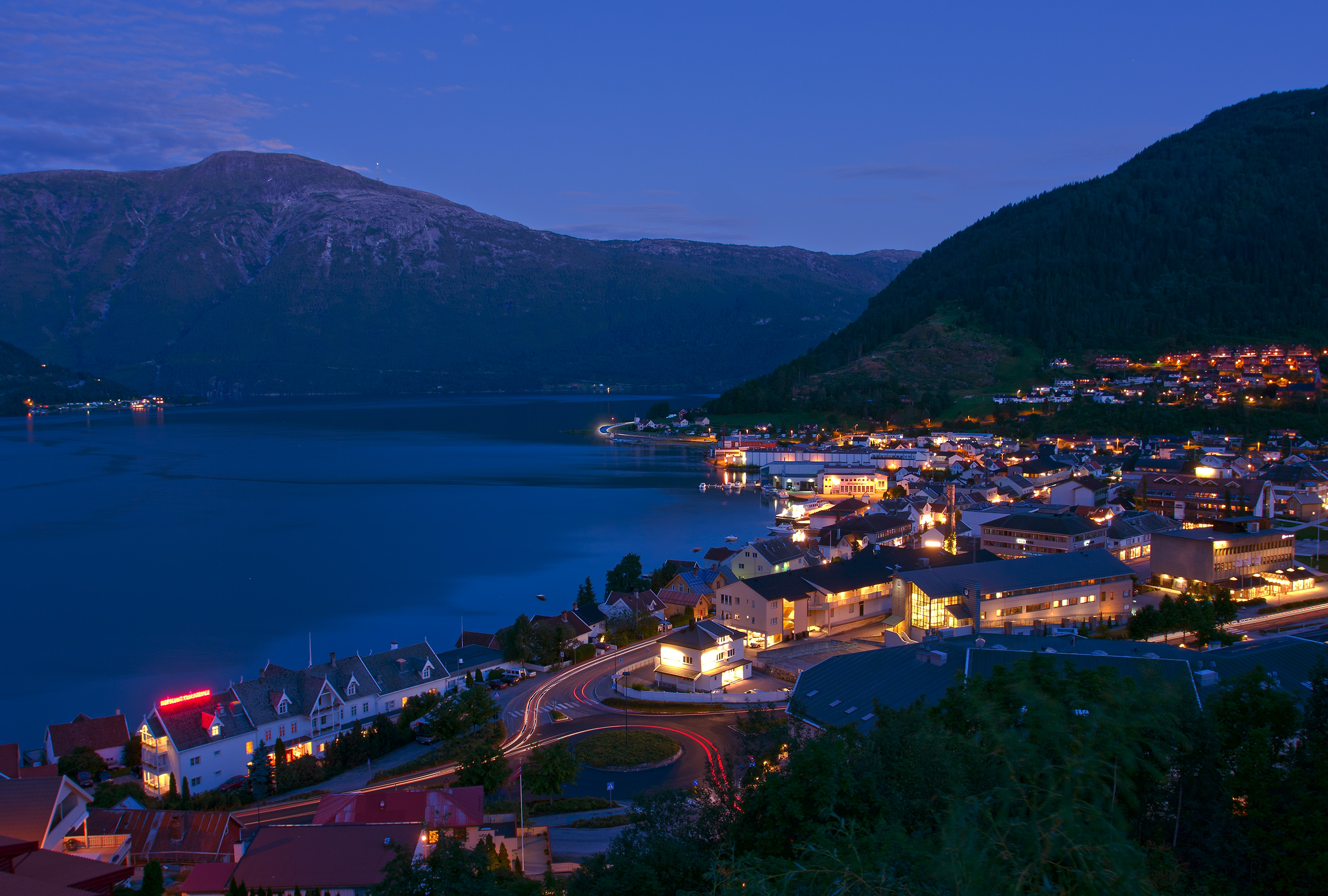
- Sogndal by night

- Coat of arms

- Vestland within Norway

- Sogndal within Vestland
- Coordinates: 61°14′32″N 07°03′18″E
- Country: Norway
- County: Vestland
- District: Sogn
- Established: 1 Jan 1838
  - Created as: Formannskapsdistrikt
- Administrative centre: Hermansverk/Leikanger

Government
  - Mayor (2023): Stig Ove Ølmheim (Ap)

Area
  - Total: 1,257.84 km^{2} (485.65 sq mi)
  - Land: 1,229.17 km^{2} (474.59 sq mi)
  - Water: 28.67 km^{2} (11.07 sq mi) 2.3%
  - Rank: #84 in Norway
- Highest elevation: 1,741.81 m (5,714.6 ft)

Population (2025)
  - Total: 12,496
  - Rank: #96 in Norway
  - Density: 9.9/km^{2} (26/sq mi)
  - Change (10 years): ▲ +10%
- Demonym: Systrening

Official language
  - Norwegian form: Nynorsk; Sognamål (dialect)
- Time zone: UTC+01:00 (CET)
  - Summer (DST): UTC+02:00 (CEST)
- ISO 3166 code: NO-4640
- Website: Official website

Sogndal is a municipality in Vestland county, Norway. It is located on the northern shore of the Sognefjorden in the traditional district of Sogn. The village of Hermansverk/Leikanger is the administrative center of Sogndal Municipality. Other villages in the municipality include Balestrand, Dragsviki, Fimreite, Fjærland, Kaupanger, Kjørnes, Norane, Sæle, and Sogndalsfjøra. Sogndal Airport, Haukåsen is located 10 kilometres (6.2 mi) southwest of Kaupanger. The most populated settlement in the municipality is Sogndalsfjøra.

The 1,257.84-square-kilometre (485.65 sq mi) municipality is the 84th largest by area out of the 357 municipalities in Norway. Sogndal Municipality is the 96th most populous municipality in Norway with a population of 12,496. The municipality's population density is 9.9 inhabitants per square kilometre (26/sq mi) and its population has increased by 10% over the previous 10-year period.

The Norwegian dialect spoken in Sogndal Municipality is called sognamål.

In 1917, a farmer in Sogndal (Kato Linde) plowed up the Eggja stone, a gravestone with runic inscriptions important for the history of the Old Norse language.

== General information ==
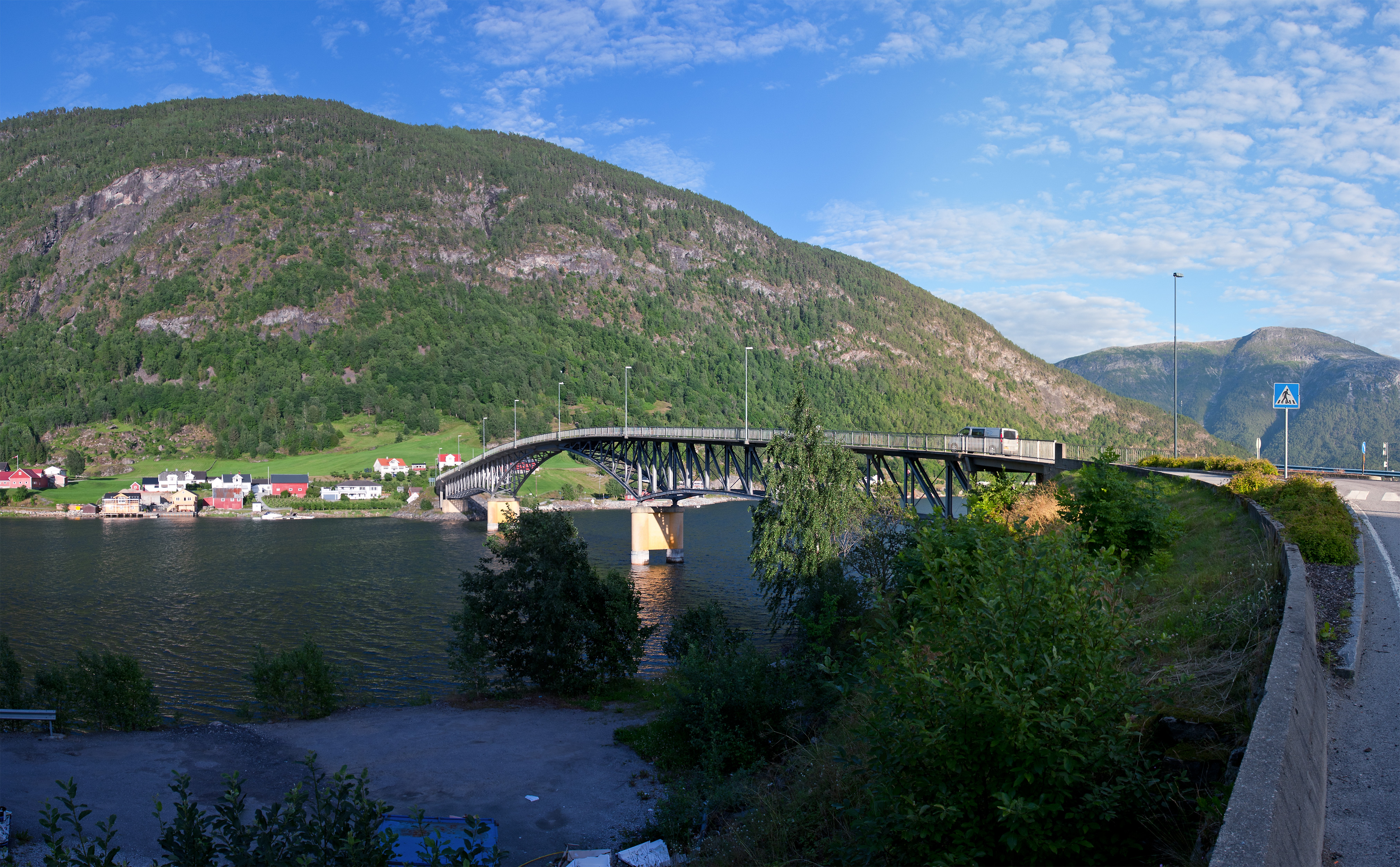
Loftesnesbrua 01

The parish of Sogndal was established as a municipality on 1 January 1838 (see formannskapsdistrikt law). The original municipality was identical to the Church of Norway's Sogndal prestegjeld with the parishes (sokn) of Stedje, Norane, and Kaupanger.

During the 1960s, there were many municipal mergers across Norway due to the work of the Schei Committee. On 1 January 1964, the Tingstad area (population: 5) was transferred from Leikanger Municipality to Sogndal Municipality.

On 1 January 2000, the parish of Fjærland was transferred from Balestrand Municipality to Sogndal Municipality after the completion of the Frudal Tunnel was built which connected the previously isolated area of Fjærland to Sogndal rather than Balestrand.

Historically, this municipality was part of the old Sogn og Fjordane county. On 1 January 2020, the municipality became a part of the newly-formed Vestland county (after Hordaland and Sogn og Fjordane counties were merged). Also on that date, a major municipal merger took place. Sogndal Municipality (population: 8,191) was merged with Leikanger Municipality (population: 2,331) and most of Balestrand Municipality (except for the Nesse area which was merged into Høyanger Municipality) to form a much larger Sogndal Municipality. On the same date the administrative centre was moved from Sogndalsfjøra to Hermansverk.

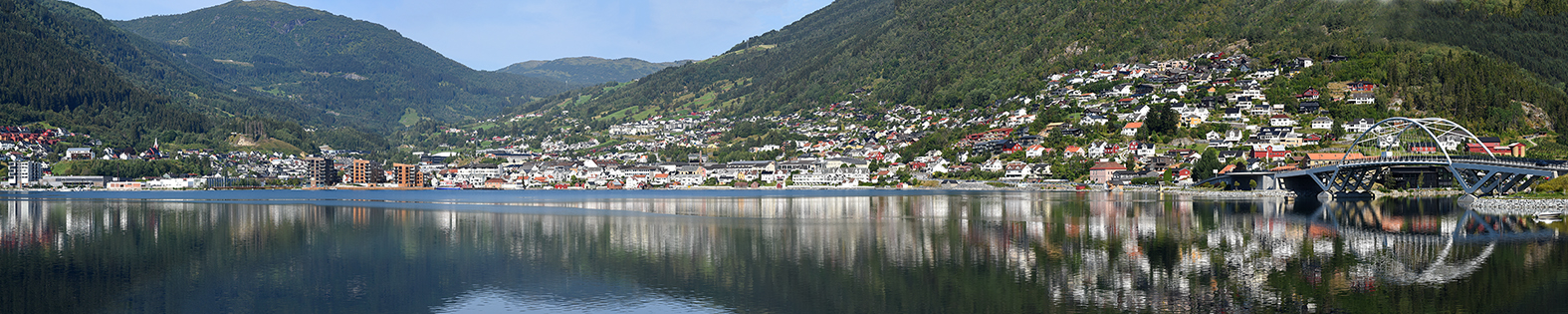
Sogndalsfjøra, photo Vadim Chuprina 2024

=== Name ===
The municipality (originally the parish) is named after the Sokndalen valley (Old Norse: Sóknardalr) since the historic Stedje Church was built there. The first element is the genitive case of the name of the river Sókn (now called Sogndalselvi). The river name is derived from the verb sœkja which means "to seek" or "to look for", thus it is "the river which seeks (finds/forces) its way". The last element is dalr which means "valley" or "dale".

=== Coat of arms ===
Arms: 1984-2019

Arms: since 2020

The original coat of arms was granted on 14 December 1984 and was used until 31 December 2019. The official blazon is "Azure, a ship's stern issuant Or" (Norwegian: På blå grunn ein oppveksande gull skipsstamn). This means the arms have a blue field (background) and the charge is the front of a Viking ship. The charge has a tincture of Or which means it is commonly colored yellow, but if it is made out of metal, then gold is used. The ship symbolized the nearby naval Battle of Fimreite between King Sverre of Norway and the local King Magnus Erlingsson in the year 1184. The latter was killed in battle together with many nobles of the time. The arms were designed by the artist Inge Rotevatn from Nordfjordeid. The municipal flag had the same design as the coat of arms.

A new coat of arms was granted in 2019 for use starting on 1 January 2020 when the municipality was enlarged. The blazon is "Azure, an S-shape argent narrowing to chief". This means the arms have a blue field (background) and the charge is an S-shaped curve that narrows towards the top of the design. The charge has a tincture of argent which means it is commonly colored white, but if it is made out of metal, then silver is used. The arms symbolize a fjord curving between the mountains. The curving shape is also similar to an "S" which is the first letter of the name of the municipality.

=== Churches ===
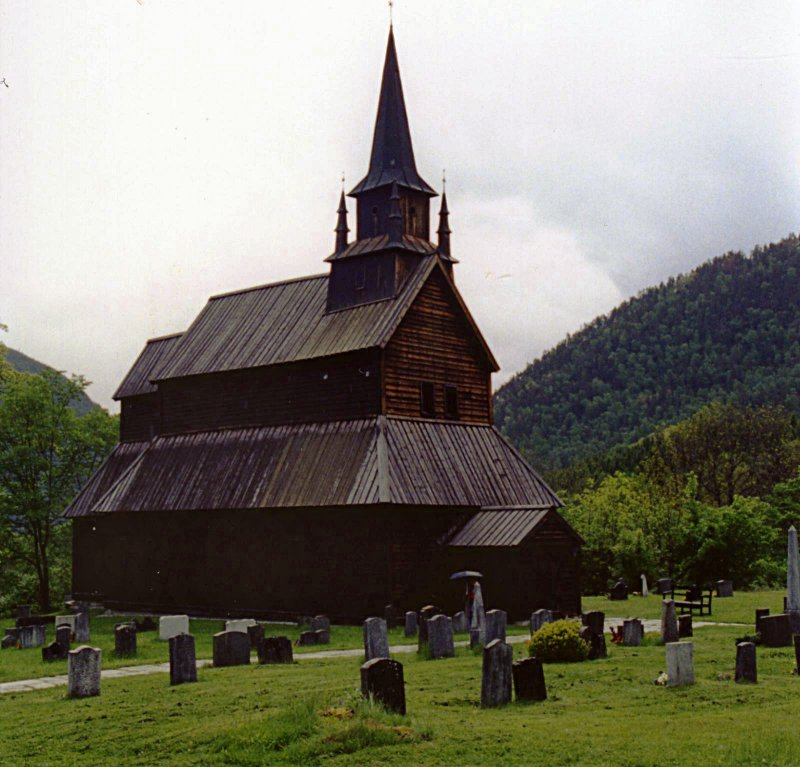
Kaupanger stave church.

The Church of Norway has six parishes (sokn) within Sogndal Municipality. It is part of the Sogn prosti (deanery) in the Diocese of Bjørgvin.

The main church of the parish is in Stedje. This is probably one of the oldest church sites in Sogn, probably erected in the first half of the 11th century. The present church was built in 1867, at the same time the old stave church was torn down. A runestone stands near the church, and traces of a Viking settlement have been found nearby.

Sogndal has historically had three parishes (under Stedje): Kaupanger, Norane, and Fjærland. All three of these are also old church sites. The first churches in Kaupanger and Norane were probably built as early as the 11th century and in Fjærland the original church was built around 1600. The present church in Fjærland was built in 1861 and in Norane in 1863. In Kaupanger, the old Stave church from the 12th century is still standing. Excavations show that this was probably the third church on this site. The church was rebuilt in 1862 and lost most of its original character. But today, as a result of a restoration project you will find the church much as it was prior to 1862.

Churches in Sogndal Municipality
Parish (sokn)	Church name	Location of the church	Year built
Balestrand	Kvamsøy Church	Kvamsøy	1290
Balestrand	Sæle Church	Sæle	1903
Balestrand	Tjugum Church	Dragsviki	1863
Fjærland	Fjærland Church	Fjærland	1861
Kaupanger	Kaupanger Stave Church	Kaupanger	12th century
Leikanger	Leikanger Church	Leikanger	1166
Norum	Ølmheim Church	Norane	1863
Stedje	Stedje Church	Sogndalsfjøra	1867

== Government ==
Sogndal Municipality is responsible for primary education (through 10th grade), outpatient health services, senior citizen services, welfare and other social services, zoning, economic development, and municipal roads and utilities. The municipality is governed by a municipal council of directly elected representatives. The mayor is indirectly elected by a vote of the municipal council. The municipality is under the jurisdiction of the Sogn og Fjordane District Court and the Gulating Court of Appeal.

=== Municipal council ===
The municipal council (Kommunestyre) of Sogndal Municipality is made up of 31 representatives that are elected to four year terms. The tables below show the current and historical composition of the council by political party.

Sogndal kommunestyre 2023–2027
Party name (in Nynorsk)	Number of representatives
Labour Party (Arbeidarpartiet)	8
Progress Party (Framstegspartiet)	3
Green Party (Miljøpartiet Dei Grøne)	1
Conservative Party (Høgre)	4
Christian Democratic Party (Kristeleg Folkeparti)	2
Red Party (Raudt)	1
Centre Party (Senterpartiet)	7
Socialist Left Party (Sosialistisk Venstreparti)	4
Liberal Party (Venstre)	1
Total number of members:	31

Sogndal kommunestyre 2019–2023
Party name (in Nynorsk)	Number of representatives
Labour Party (Arbeidarpartiet)	6
Progress Party (Framstegspartiet)	1
Green Party (Miljøpartiet Dei Grøne)	1
Conservative Party (Høgre)	5
Christian Democratic Party (Kristeleg Folkeparti)	2
Centre Party (Senterpartiet)	16
Socialist Left Party (Sosialistisk Venstreparti)	4
Liberal Party (Venstre)	2
Total number of members:	37
Note: On 1 January 2020, Balestrand Municipality and Leikanger Municipality became part of Sogndal Municipality.

Sogndal kommunestyre 2015–2019
Party name (in Nynorsk)	Number of representatives
Labour Party (Arbeidarpartiet)	8
Progress Party (Framstegspartiet)	2
Conservative Party (Høgre)	4
Christian Democratic Party (Kristeleg Folkeparti)	1
Centre Party (Senterpartiet)	6
Socialist Left Party (Sosialistisk Venstreparti)	2
Liberal Party (Venstre)	2
Total number of members:	25

Sogndal kommunestyre 2011–2015
Party name (in Nynorsk)	Number of representatives
Labour Party (Arbeidarpartiet)	9
Progress Party (Framstegspartiet)	3
Conservative Party (Høgre)	3
Christian Democratic Party (Kristeleg Folkeparti)	2
Centre Party (Senterpartiet)	4
Socialist Left Party (Sosialistisk Venstreparti)	2
Liberal Party (Venstre)	2
Total number of members:	25

Sogndal kommunestyre 2007–2011
Party name (in Nynorsk)	Number of representatives
Labour Party (Arbeidarpartiet)	9
Progress Party (Framstegspartiet)	5
Conservative Party (Høgre)	2
Christian Democratic Party (Kristeleg Folkeparti)	2
Centre Party (Senterpartiet)	4
Socialist Left Party (Sosialistisk Venstreparti)	2
Liberal Party (Venstre)	1
Total number of members:	25

Sogndal kommunestyre 2003–2007
Party name (in Nynorsk)	Number of representatives
Labour Party (Arbeidarpartiet)	8
Progress Party (Framstegspartiet)	4
Conservative Party (Høgre)	1
Christian Democratic Party (Kristeleg Folkeparti)	2
Centre Party (Senterpartiet)	7
Socialist Left Party (Sosialistisk Venstreparti)	2
Liberal Party (Venstre)	1
Total number of members:	25

Sogndal kommunestyre 1999–2003
Party name (in Nynorsk)	Number of representatives
Labour Party (Arbeidarpartiet)	9
Progress Party (Framstegspartiet)	3
Conservative Party (Høgre)	2
Christian Democratic Party (Kristeleg Folkeparti)	3
Centre Party (Senterpartiet)	8
Socialist Left Party (Sosialistisk Venstreparti)	2
Liberal Party (Venstre)	2
Total number of members:	29

Sogndal kommunestyre 1995–1999
Party name (in Nynorsk)	Number of representatives
Labour Party (Arbeidarpartiet)	9
Progress Party (Framstegspartiet)	3
Conservative Party (Høgre)	2
Christian Democratic Party (Kristeleg Folkeparti)	2
Centre Party (Senterpartiet)	9
Socialist Left Party (Sosialistisk Venstreparti)	2
Liberal Party (Venstre)	2
Total number of members:	29

Sogndal kommunestyre 1991–1995
Party name (in Nynorsk)	Number of representatives
Labour Party (Arbeidarpartiet)	9
Progress Party (Framstegspartiet)	1
Conservative Party (Høgre)	4
Christian Democratic Party (Kristeleg Folkeparti)	2
Centre Party (Senterpartiet)	8
Socialist Left Party (Sosialistisk Venstreparti)	3
Liberal Party (Venstre)	2
Total number of members:	29

Sogndal kommunestyre 1987–1991
Party name (in Nynorsk)	Number of representatives
Labour Party (Arbeidarpartiet)	12
Conservative Party (Høgre)	6
Christian Democratic Party (Kristeleg Folkeparti)	2
Centre Party (Senterpartiet)	5
Socialist Left Party (Sosialistisk Venstreparti)	1
Liberal Party (Venstre)	3
Total number of members:	29

Sogndal kommunestyre 1983–1987
Party name (in Nynorsk)	Number of representatives
Labour Party (Arbeidarpartiet)	11
Conservative Party (Høgre)	7
Christian Democratic Party (Kristeleg Folkeparti)	3
Centre Party (Senterpartiet)	4
Socialist Left Party (Sosialistisk Venstreparti)	1
Liberal Party (Venstre)	3
Total number of members:	29

Sogndal kommunestyre 1979–1983
Party name (in Nynorsk)	Number of representatives
Labour Party (Arbeidarpartiet)	8
Conservative Party (Høgre)	7
Christian Democratic Party (Kristeleg Folkeparti)	3
Centre Party (Senterpartiet)	5
Socialist Left Party (Sosialistisk Venstreparti)	1
Liberal Party (Venstre)	3
Non-party common list (Upolitisk Samlingsliste)	2
Total number of members:	29

Sogndal kommunestyre 1975–1979
Party name (in Nynorsk)	Number of representatives
Labour Party (Arbeidarpartiet)	8
Conservative Party (Høgre)	4
Christian Democratic Party (Kristeleg Folkeparti)	4
New People's Party (Nye Folkepartiet)	1
Centre Party (Senterpartiet)	5
Socialist Left Party (Sosialistisk Venstreparti)	1
Liberal Party (Venstre)	4
Non-party common list (Upolitisk Samlingsliste)	2
Total number of members:	29

Sogndal kommunestyre 1971–1975
Party name (in Nynorsk)	Number of representatives
Labour Party (Arbeidarpartiet)	8
Conservative Party (Høgre)	4
Christian Democratic Party (Kristeleg Folkeparti)	3
Centre Party (Senterpartiet)	7
Liberal Party (Venstre)	4
Local List(s) (Lokale lister)	3
Total number of members:	29

Sogndal kommunestyre 1967–1971
Party name (in Nynorsk)	Number of representatives
Labour Party (Arbeidarpartiet)	10
Conservative Party (Høgre)	5
Christian Democratic Party (Kristeleg Folkeparti)	2
Centre Party (Senterpartiet)	7
Liberal Party (Venstre)	5
Total number of members:	29

Sogndal kommunestyre 1963–1967
Party name (in Nynorsk)	Number of representatives
Labour Party (Arbeidarpartiet)	10
Conservative Party (Høgre)	5
Christian Democratic Party (Kristeleg Folkeparti)	3
Centre Party (Senterpartiet)	7
Liberal Party (Venstre)	4
Total number of members:	29

Sogndal heradsstyre 1959–1963
Party name (in Nynorsk)	Number of representatives
Labour Party (Arbeidarpartiet)	9
Conservative Party (Høgre)	3
Christian Democratic Party (Kristeleg Folkeparti)	3
Centre Party (Senterpartiet)	8
Liberal Party (Venstre)	5
Local List(s) (Lokale lister)	1
Total number of members:	29

Sogndal heradsstyre 1955–1959
Party name (in Nynorsk)	Number of representatives
Labour Party (Arbeidarpartiet)	9
Conservative Party (Høgre)	3
Christian Democratic Party (Kristeleg Folkeparti)	4
Farmers' Party (Bondepartiet)	7
Liberal Party (Venstre)	6
Total number of members:	29

Sogndal heradsstyre 1951–1955
Party name (in Nynorsk)	Number of representatives
Labour Party (Arbeidarpartiet)	12
Conservative Party (Høgre)	4
Farmers' Party (Bondepartiet)	12
Liberal Party (Venstre)	8
Total number of members:	36

Sogndal heradsstyre 1947–1951
Party name (in Nynorsk)	Number of representatives
Labour Party (Arbeidarpartiet)	8
Conservative Party (Høgre)	1
Farmers' Party (Bondepartiet)	11
Liberal Party (Venstre)	11
List of workers, fishermen, and small farmholders (Arbeidarar, fiskarar, småbrukarar liste)	3
Local List(s) (Lokale lister)	2
Total number of members:	36

Sogndal heradsstyre 1945–1947
Party name (in Nynorsk)	Number of representatives
Labour Party (Arbeidarpartiet)	11
Conservative Party (Høgre)	2
Farmers' Party (Bondepartiet)	9
Liberal Party (Venstre)	11
Joint List(s) of Non-Socialist Parties (Borgarlege Felleslister)	1
Local List(s) (Lokale lister)	2
Total number of members:	36

Sogndal heradsstyre 1937–1941*
Party name (in Nynorsk)	Number of representatives
Labour Party (Arbeidarpartiet)	9
Conservative Party (Høgre)	3
Farmers' Party (Bondepartiet)	12
Liberal Party (Venstre)	8
Joint List(s) of Non-Socialist Parties (Borgarlege Felleslister)	4
Total number of members:	36
Note: Due to the German occupation of Norway during World War II, no elections were held for new municipal councils until after the war ended in 1945.

=== Mayors ===
The mayor (Nynorsk: ordførar) of Sogndal Municipality is the political leader of the municipality and the chairperson of the municipal council. Here is a list of people who have held this position:

- 1838–1839: Rev. Wilhelm Christian Magelsen
- 1840–1841: Nils Knagenhjelm
- 1842–1851: Fredrik Christian Juell
- 1852–1853: Ole Flugum
- 1854–1864: Carl Johan Fleischer
- 1865–1865: Christen Knagenhjelm
- 1866–1869: Ole Flugum
- 1870–1877: Christen Knagenhjelm
- 1878–1878: Jakob Liv Rosted Sverdrup (V)
- 1879–1879: Ingebrigt Gurvin
- 1880–1883: Oluf Andreas Rønneberg
- 1884–1885: Johannes O. Bondevik
- 1886–1893: Henrik Mohn Dahl
- 1894–1898: Ivar Gurvin
- 1899–1901: Skak Lystrup Ormelseng
- 1902–1904: Reidar Darre-Jensen
- 1905–1910: Ivar Gurvin
- 1911–1913: Gjert Falch Heiberg
- 1914–1916: Vilhelm Flugheim
- 1917–1919: Anders K. Tylden
- 1920–1930: Jonas Schanke Mossige
- 1930–1931: Tomas Nornes
- 1932–1937: Ivar O. Skjeldestad
- 1938–1940: Lars Uglum
- 1945–1946: Hans H. H. Heiberg (H)
- 1947–1947: Johan Flugheim
- 1948–1951: Lars Uglum
- 1952–1957: Audun A. Slinde (V)
- 1958–1961: Per L. Slinde
- 1962–1963: Audun A. Slinde (V)
- 1964–1967: Sigmund Ylvisåker
- 1968–1973: Nils Knagenhjelm (H)
- 1974–1977: Erlend Ylvisåker (V)
- 1978–1981: Kåre Lerum (H)
- 1982–1983: Ivar Falck Husum (Sp)
- 1984–1985: Trygve Bjørk (Ap)
- 1986–1987: Bjørg Rimeslåtten (V)
- 1988–1993: Trygve Bjørk (Ap)
- 1994–2003: Jarle Skartun (Sp)
- 2003–2007: Karen Marie Hjelmeseter (Sp)
- 2007–2023: Jarle Aarvoll (Ap)
- 2023–present: Stig Ove Ølmheim (Ap)

=== Education ===
With more than 2,000 students in the municipality, Sogndal is the educational center of Vestland County. Students from all over Norway come to Sogndal and they create a high level of activity, which is hard to find in places of similar size.

Western Norway University of Applied Sciences is one of the main employers in Sogndal Municipality. The Western Norway Research Institute is located within the campus, but it is an independent institution with special expertise in information communication, technology systems, environmental research, and organizational research. In addition to the University College, Sogndal has a large upper secondary school and the oldest continuously running folk high school in the country.

== History ==
=== Subsistence farming ===
Sogndal is an old dwelling place. Archaeological excavations indicate that people have been living there as far back as 700 BC. The first farms in Sogndal date back to the 1st century AD and findings indicate that these were rich farms. Since ancient time, agriculture has been the most important trade in Sogndal. Traditionally grain cultivation and animal husbandry were the most important, but forestry and fruit growing were also common. Fruit, especially apples, have been grown as far back as there are written sources. In the historical records of King Sverre (12th century) there are words and names indicating that apples have been grown in this area.

=== Industrial revolution ===
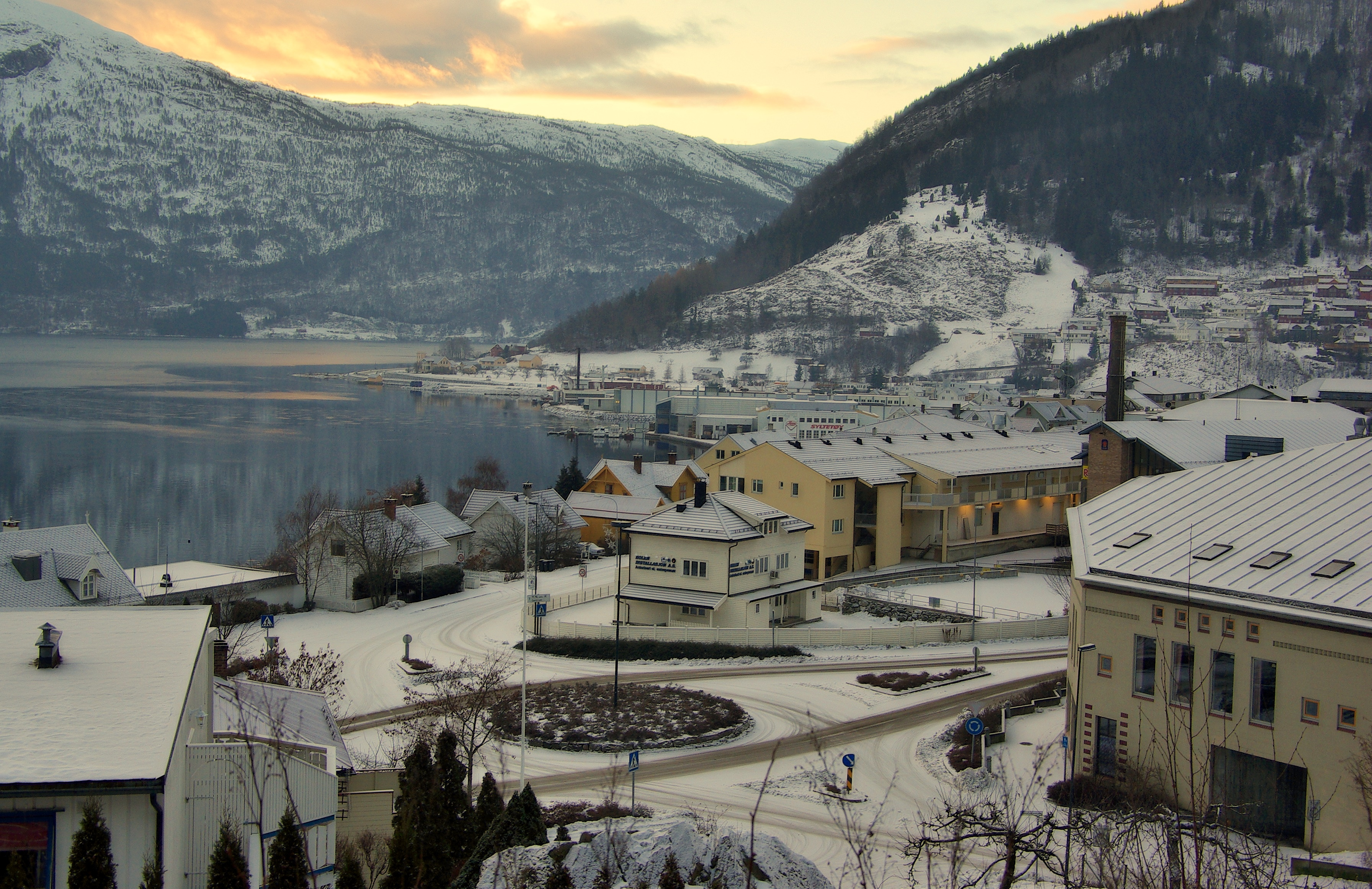
Sogndalsfjøra

The largest settlement of Sogndal, Sogndalsfjøra, has a long and remarkable history as a seaside settlement. It probably served as the center of the parish for centuries, with general stores and bakeries testifying to its early importance as a center of commerce and trade.

This was a community characterized by vigorous activity. There were boat landings for farmers living alongside the fjord, military functions were established here, and later on, house owners would rent rooms to the first students of the newly established folk high school. Legal assemblies were held at Hofslund, the vicar lived just nearby, and the church was located within sight at Stedje.

Sogndalsfjøra was inhabited as early as the 17th century. By 1701, the number of permanent residents had reached 60–70, mainly people who did not own property but made their living as day laborers. A century later, the population had increased to 222, and by 1900, 422 residents were registered.

Towards the end of the 19th century, the industrial base had been widened and strengthened. In 1881, there were house painters, a goldsmith, saddlers, carpenters, shoemakers, watchmakers, a tinker, and a butcher. Ten years later, Sogndalsfjøra had its own insurance agent, a telephone operator, an "automobile chauffeur", a photographer, and a printer. Sogndalsfjøra was no longer a slum, it was becoming a center of trade, commerce and education.

Sogndal has never been a typical industrial community. Situated along the river 300 metres (980 ft) upstream from the fjord, there was a matchstick factory from the mid-19th century onwards. Later, a wool mill and a bottling plant for soft drinks and fruit juices were added. In 1911, a hydroelectric power station with a 200 kilowatt generator was built here. This was one of the region's first power stations, in fact one of the first in rural Norway.

On the other side of the river is the Stedje Mill, a turbine-driven grain mill that was of great importance to Sogndal and the neighboring parishes during the early 20th century. It was established in 1893 and remained in use until the 1960s, owned and run by the same family through three generations.

== Geography ==
Sogndal Municipality is located on the northern shore of the large Sognefjorden, surrounding the Sogndalsfjorden which branches off the main fjord. Northern Sogndal surrounds the inner part of the Fjærlandsfjorden. The municipality is cut in half by mountains and the Frudal Tunnel connects the southern (more populous) part of Sogndal to the Fjærland area in the north. The Fjærland area is surrounded by mountains and water. The only other access to the Fjærland area comes via the Fjærland Tunnel which connects to Sunnfjord Municipality to the north.

The Jostedalsbreen National Park lies in the far northern part of the municipality. The Jostedalsbreen glacier is partially located in Sogndal Municipality, and it has several small glacial arms inside Sogndal: Bøyabreen, Jostefonn, and Supphellebreen. The municipality is quite mountainous. The highest point in the municipality is the 1,741.81-metre (5,714.6 ft) tall mountain Grensevarden, a tripoint on the border of Sogndal Municipality, Sunnfjord Municipality, and Luster Municipality.

Luster Municipality lies to the northeast and east; Sunnfjord Municipality lies to the northwest; Høyanger Municipality lies to the west; Vik Municipality lies to the south (across the Sognefjorden), and Lærdal Municipality lies to the southeast (across the Sognefjorden).

== Climate ==
Due to vast topographical differences, the climate of Sogndal varies from temperate oceanic (Cfb) at sea level along the Sognefjord to subarctic (Dfc) at higher elevations to alpine tundra at the high elevations in the mountains above the treeline which sits at 900 metres (3,000 ft) above sea level. Njøs is closest weather station to Sogndalsfjøra (about 16-kilometre (9.9 mi) away as the crow flies), and has a temperate oceanic climate (marine west coast climate). The wettest season is September - January, while the driest season is April - August. Monthly mean temperatures range from 0.7 °C (33.3 °F) in February to 16.5 °C (61.7 °F) in July. The all-time high at Njøs 32.5 °C (90.5 °F) is from July 2019, and the all-time low −17.4 °C (0.7 °F) was recorded January 1987 at an earlier station in Leikanger, close to Njøs.

Climate data for Njøs in Sogndal 1991-2020 (45 m, precipitation days 1961-90, extremes 1957-1990 & 2013-2020)
Month	Jan	Feb	Mar	Apr	May	Jun	Jul	Aug	Sep	Oct	Nov	Dec	Year
Record high °C (°F)	12 (54)	13.9 (57.0)	15.2 (59.4)	20.2 (68.4)	29.4 (84.9)	30.3 (86.5)	32.5 (90.5)	30.4 (86.7)	24.4 (75.9)	20.2 (68.4)	16.6 (61.9)	14 (57)	32.5 (90.5)
Daily mean °C (°F)	0.9 (33.6)	0.7 (33.3)	2.7 (36.9)	6.4 (43.5)	10.2 (50.4)	13.8 (56.8)	16.5 (61.7)	15.4 (59.7)	11.8 (53.2)	7.2 (45.0)	4 (39)	1.3 (34.3)	7.6 (45.6)
Record low °C (°F)	−17.4 (0.7)	−14 (7)	−12.7 (9.1)	−7 (19)	−1.6 (29.1)	1 (34)	5.1 (41.2)	4.5 (40.1)	−0.3 (31.5)	−3.5 (25.7)	−10.9 (12.4)	−16.5 (2.3)	−17.4 (0.7)
Average precipitation mm (inches)	113 (4.4)	88 (3.5)	82 (3.2)	53 (2.1)	42 (1.7)	55 (2.2)	73 (2.9)	71 (2.8)	107 (4.2)	106 (4.2)	102 (4.0)	127 (5.0)	1,019 (40.2)
Average precipitation days (≥ 1.0 mm)	13	9	11	7	8	10	11	12	15	16	14	14	140
Source 1: eklima (means, precipitation, extremes - data by met.no)
Source 2: yr.no Njøs climate statistics

The Norwegian meteorological office runs several stations in the municipality. Fjærland is situated near the head of a long and narrow fjord branch with less oceanic influences and surrounded by high mountains with Norway's largest glacier nearby. There is also a station at Sogndal Airport, situated at 497 metres (1,631 ft) above sea level.

Climate data for Fjærland, Sogndal (2002–2020 averages; extremes since 1938)
Month	Jan	Feb	Mar	Apr	May	Jun	Jul	Aug	Sep	Oct	Nov	Dec	Year
Record high °C (°F)	14.8 (58.6)	12.0 (53.6)	14.1 (57.4)	21.6 (70.9)	28.7 (83.7)	30.8 (87.4)	33.9 (93.0)	32.8 (91.0)	24.2 (75.6)	21.5 (70.7)	15.7 (60.3)	13.5 (56.3)	33.9 (93.0)
Mean maximum °C (°F)	7.7 (45.9)	7.7 (45.9)	10.3 (50.5)	16.7 (62.1)	23.2 (73.8)	26.4 (79.5)	28.6 (83.5)	26.0 (78.8)	21.3 (70.3)	15.6 (60.1)	11.9 (53.4)	9.1 (48.4)	29.2 (84.6)
Mean daily maximum °C (°F)	0.6 (33.1)	1.6 (34.9)	5.2 (41.4)	10.2 (50.4)	15.3 (59.5)	19.4 (66.9)	20.9 (69.6)	19.4 (66.9)	14.6 (58.3)	9.2 (48.6)	4.2 (39.6)	1.4 (34.5)	10.2 (50.3)
Daily mean °C (°F)	−2.2 (28.0)	−1.8 (28.8)	1.0 (33.8)	5.2 (41.4)	9.9 (49.8)	13.8 (56.8)	15.7 (60.3)	14.8 (58.6)	10.9 (51.6)	5.8 (42.4)	1.6 (34.9)	−1.2 (29.8)	6.1 (43.0)
Mean daily minimum °C (°F)	−4.9 (23.2)	−5.1 (22.8)	−3.3 (26.1)	0.2 (32.4)	4.5 (40.1)	8.1 (46.6)	10.5 (50.9)	10.1 (50.2)	7.2 (45.0)	2.4 (36.3)	−1.1 (30.0)	−3.8 (25.2)	2.1 (35.7)
Mean minimum °C (°F)	−15.5 (4.1)	−16.3 (2.7)	−12.9 (8.8)	−6.3 (20.7)	−2.0 (28.4)	2.4 (36.3)	4.7 (40.5)	3.6 (38.5)	0.4 (32.7)	−5.3 (22.5)	−8.6 (16.5)	−13.3 (8.1)	−18.6 (−1.5)
Record low °C (°F)	−27.0 (−16.6)	−23.0 (−9.4)	−22.5 (−8.5)	−16.6 (2.1)	−5.7 (21.7)	−0.9 (30.4)	0.7 (33.3)	0.3 (32.5)	−3.0 (26.6)	−15.5 (4.1)	−18.5 (−1.3)	−22.5 (−8.5)	−27.0 (−16.6)
Average precipitation mm (inches)	211.8 (8.34)	151.4 (5.96)	162.1 (6.38)	97.6 (3.84)	87.3 (3.44)	82.8 (3.26)	102.8 (4.05)	123.5 (4.86)	204.6 (8.06)	209.1 (8.23)	214.7 (8.45)	250.7 (9.87)	1,898.4 (74.74)
Source: Norsk Klimaservicesenter

== Economy ==
Agriculture has always played a major role in the municipality of Sogndal. Traditionally, the industries in Sogndal have been centered around the processing of agricultural and forestry products.

=== Industrial park ===
The Kaupanger Industrial Park is home to several large companies. Lerum Industries A/S, a producer of lemonade, syrup, juice, and jam, is a cornerstone company in Sogndal, and it is also the largest factory of its kind in Norway. Gilde is a meat processing company specializing in cured meat products. Together with Lerum it constitutes the majority of the traditional industry in Sogndal. Many of the public service functions for the region are also located in Sogndal.

=== River fishing ===
Fishing permits (for salmon fishing) are sold for use on specific rivers, including Årøy-elva.

=== Shopping ===
Sogndal is the shopping and retail center for the surrounding region which has about 30,000 inhabitants. There are about 70 shops in the compact center of Sogndalsfjøra. Many of these shops are located in the new, modern shopping mall called Sogningen Storsenter.

== Sports ==
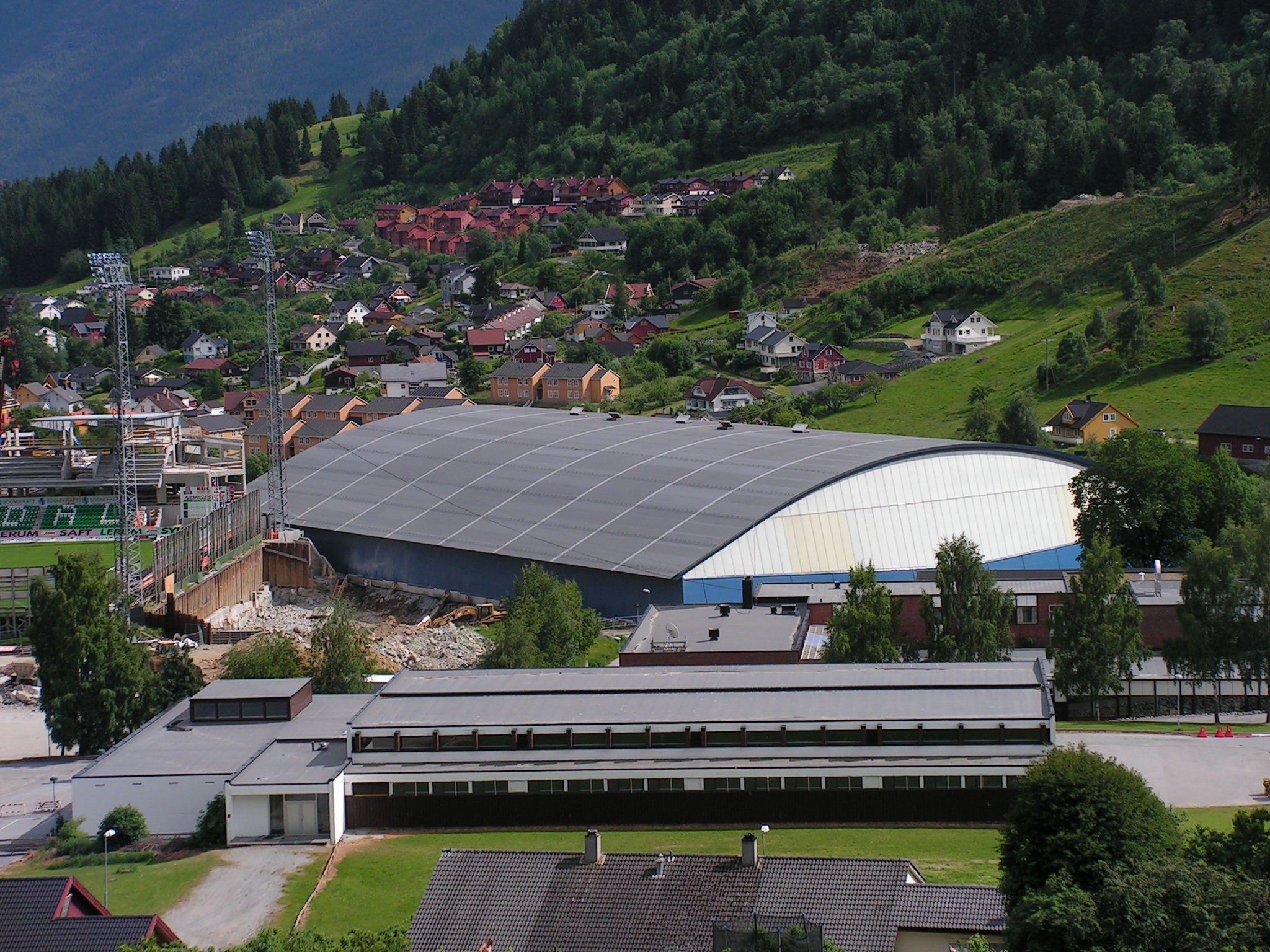
Sognahallen

=== Sogndal football ===
Sogndal has excellent sports accommodations for both indoor and outdoor sports and can offer a great variety of activities. On the national level, Sogndal Fotball (soccer), which plays at Fosshaugane stadium is well known. Sogndal Fotball (formerly Sogndal IL), plays in the Norwegian Second Division (1. Divisjon), which is the second tier of Norwegian football. In spite of the small size of Sogndalsfjøra and the low population of the municipality, Sogndal has managed to spend several seasons in Norway's top division.

=== Sognahallen ===
There is room for both competitive and recreational sports, and Sognahallen is the main sports arena in Sogndal. This is a modern sports hall, which has a full-sized football field, including team handball fields, a 100 metres (330 ft) athletics track, and an 18-metre (59 ft) high climbing wall. In cooperation with the Norwegian State College for Physical Education and Sport, Sognahallen has established a great scientific sports centre. This sports centre consists of a strength training studio, an aerobic hall, and a spinning hall. Together with the Western Norway University of Applied Sciences, Sognahallen has good facilities for sports education, rehabilitation, and testing.

== Attractions ==
- De Heibergske Samlinger – Sogn Folkemuseum and Sogn Fjordmuseum at Kaupanger. It demonstrate life along the Sognefjord in the 18th century to present.
- Kaupanger stavkyrkje - the biggest Stave church in the Sognefjord region, built around 1190.
- Norsk Bremuseum in Fjærland – a museum with “hands on” activities which has won many awards and where you can learn about snow, ice and glaciers.
- Den norske bokbyen in Fjærland - various second hand bookshops, antique stores, and book cafes.
Sogndal by night

== Notable people ==
=== Public thinking & public service ===
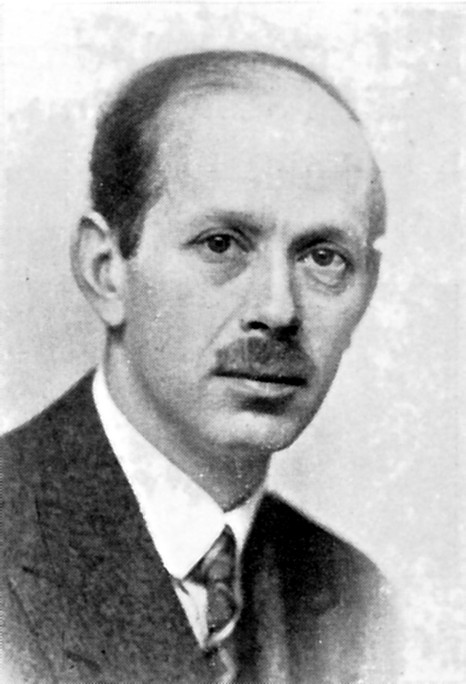
Harald Ulrik Sverdrup, 1934

- Melchior Falch (1720 in Sogndal – 1791), a jurist, magistrate, and fisheries promoter
- Niels Johannesen Loftesnæs (1789 in Sogndal – 1848), a farmer, soldier, and representative at the Norwegian Constitutional Assembly
- Hans Paludan Smith Schreuder (1817 in Sogndal - 1882), a missionary with the Zulu Kingdom
- Jens Andreas Friis (1821 in Sogndal – 1896), a philologist, lexicographer, university professor, and prominent linguist in the languages spoken by the Sami people
- Andreas Leigh Aabel (1830 in Sogndal – 1901), a physician and poet
- Harald Sverdrup (1888 in Sogndal – 1957), an oceanographer and meteorologist and director of the Norwegian Polar Institute
- Liv Signe Navarsete (born 1958 in Sogndal), a tempestuous politician, party leader, and minister

=== The Arts ===
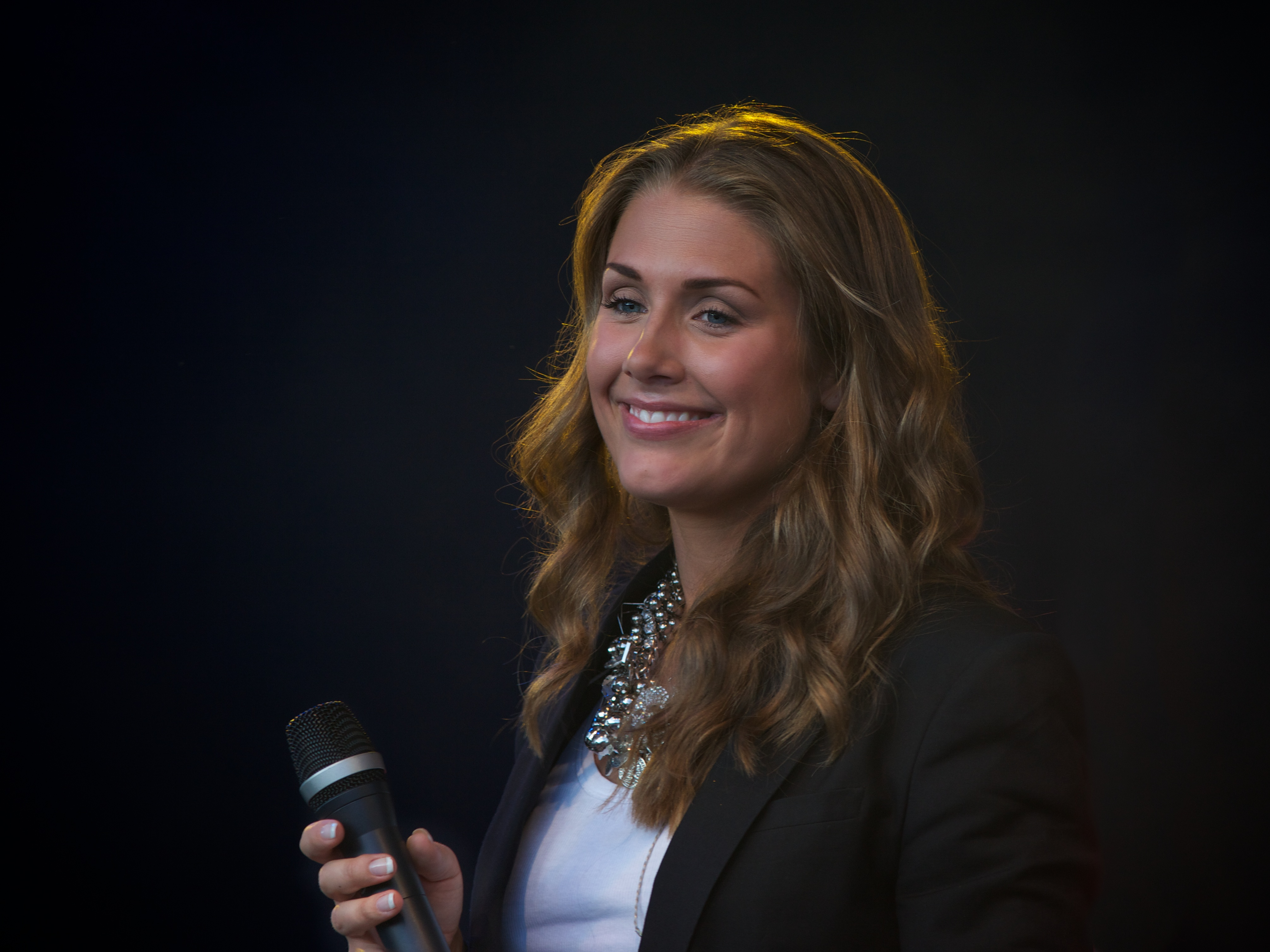
Tone Damli Aaberge, 2011

- Gjest Baardsen (1791 in Sogndalsfjøra - 1849), an outlaw, jail-breaker, non-fiction writer, songwriter, and memoirist
- Minda Ramm (1859 in Sogndal – 1924), a novelist, translator, and literary critic
- Olav Stedje (born 1953) (born 1953 in Sogndal), a soft rock singer-songwriter
- Tone Damli Aaberge (born 1988 in Sogndal), a singer-songwriter and actress
- Windir (1994–2004), a sognametal band whose members originated in Sogndal
- Eva & The Heartmaker (formed 2006), a musical duo of Eva Weel Skram and Thomas Stenersen

=== Sport ===
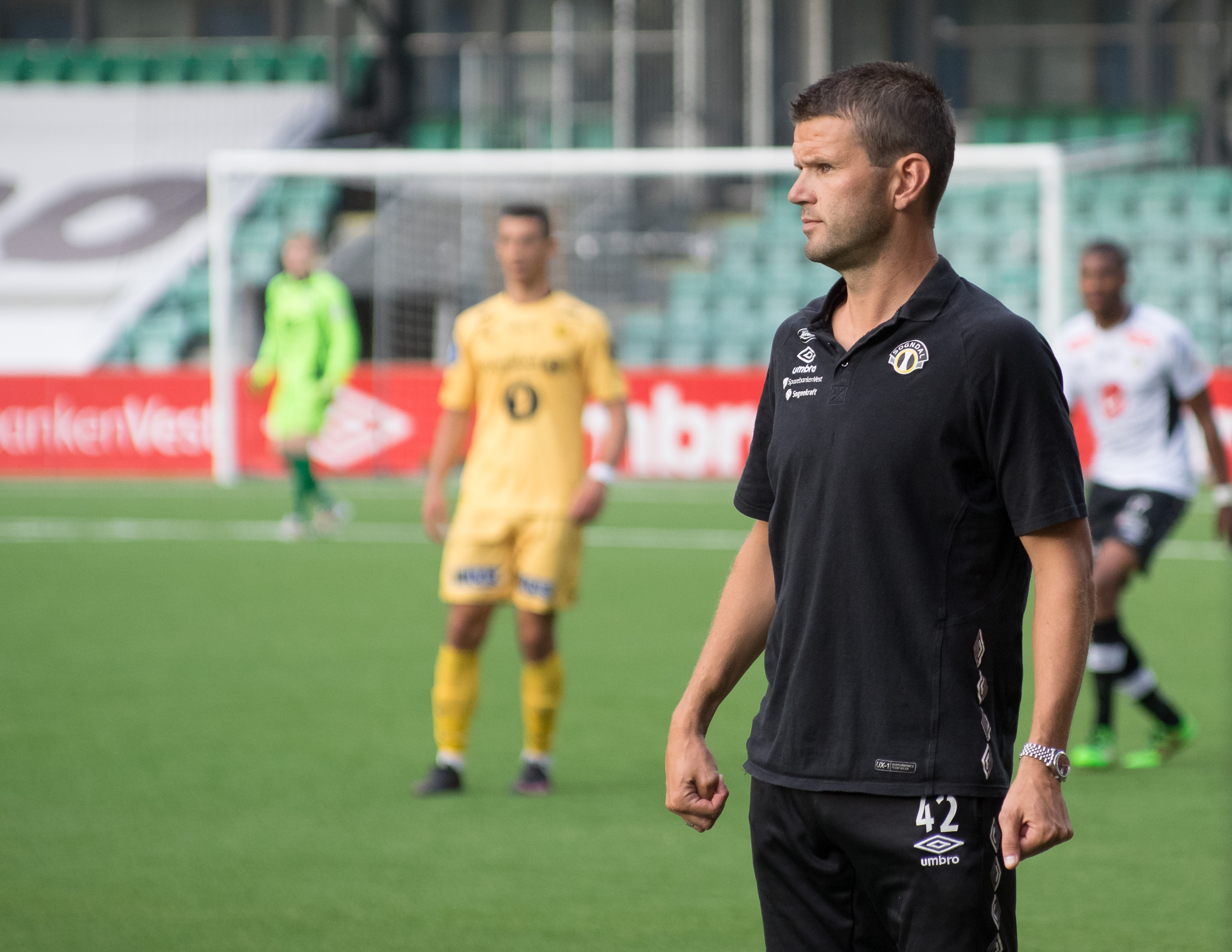
Eirik Bakke, 2016

- Eirik Bakke (born 1977 in Sogndal), a retired footballer with 386 club caps and 27 for Norway
- Thea Bjelde (born 2000 in Sogndal), a footballer with over 100 club caps and over 50 for Norway
- Terje Skjeldestad (born 1978 in Sogndal), a retired goalkeeper with 244 caps with Sogndal Fotball
- Anders Stadheim (born 1980 in Sogndal), a former footballer with over 200 club caps
- Oddbjørn Skartun (born 1989 in Sogndal), a footballer with over 200 club caps
- Kristian Opseth (born 1990 in Kaupanger), a footballer with almost 200 club caps
