= Terje Skjeldestad =

Norwegian footballer (born 1978)

Personal information
- Full name: Terje Stenehjem Skjeldestad
- Date of birth: 18 January 1978 (age 48)
- Place of birth: Sogndal, Norway
- Height: 1.88 m (6 ft 2 in)
- Position: Goalkeeper

Team information
- Current team: Sogndal (goalkeeper coach)

Youth career
- Kaupanger

Senior career*
Years	Team	Apps	(Gls)
1994	Kaupanger		
1995–2010	Sogndal	244	(0)

International career^{‡}
	Norway U16	2	(0)
	Norway U17	4	(0)
	Norway U18	4	(0)
	Norway U20	1	(0)
	Norway U21	15	(0)
2004	Norway A	3	(0)
- * Club domestic league appearances and goals as of 26 May 2009 ‡ National team caps and goals as of 26 May 2009

Terje Stenehjem Skjeldestad (born 18 January 1978) is a retired Norwegian professional football goalkeeper.
