= Niels Johannesen Loftesnæs =

Norwegian farmer and soldier

Niels Johannesen Loftesnæs (1 March 1789 – 31 May 1848) was a Norwegian farmer and soldier, who served as a representative at the Norwegian Constitutional Assembly.

Niels Johannesen Loftesnæs was born on the Loftesnes farm in Sogndal in Nordre Bergenhus, Norway. He was the oldest of seven siblings. In 1818, he moved to the Stenehjem farm in Sogndal parish where he spent the remainder of his life. He married Berthe Olsdatter in 1814 and they had eight children.

In 1814, Loftesnæs served in the military as part of the Musketeers in Sogndal Company (sogndalske kompani) division of the Bergenhus Infantry Regiment. He represented the Bergenhus Regiment at the Norwegian Constituent Assembly in 1814, alongside Ole Elias Holck. At the Assembly, he belonged to the independence party.
