= Fjærland =

Village in Sogndal Municipality, Norway

Fjærland Mundal
- Village
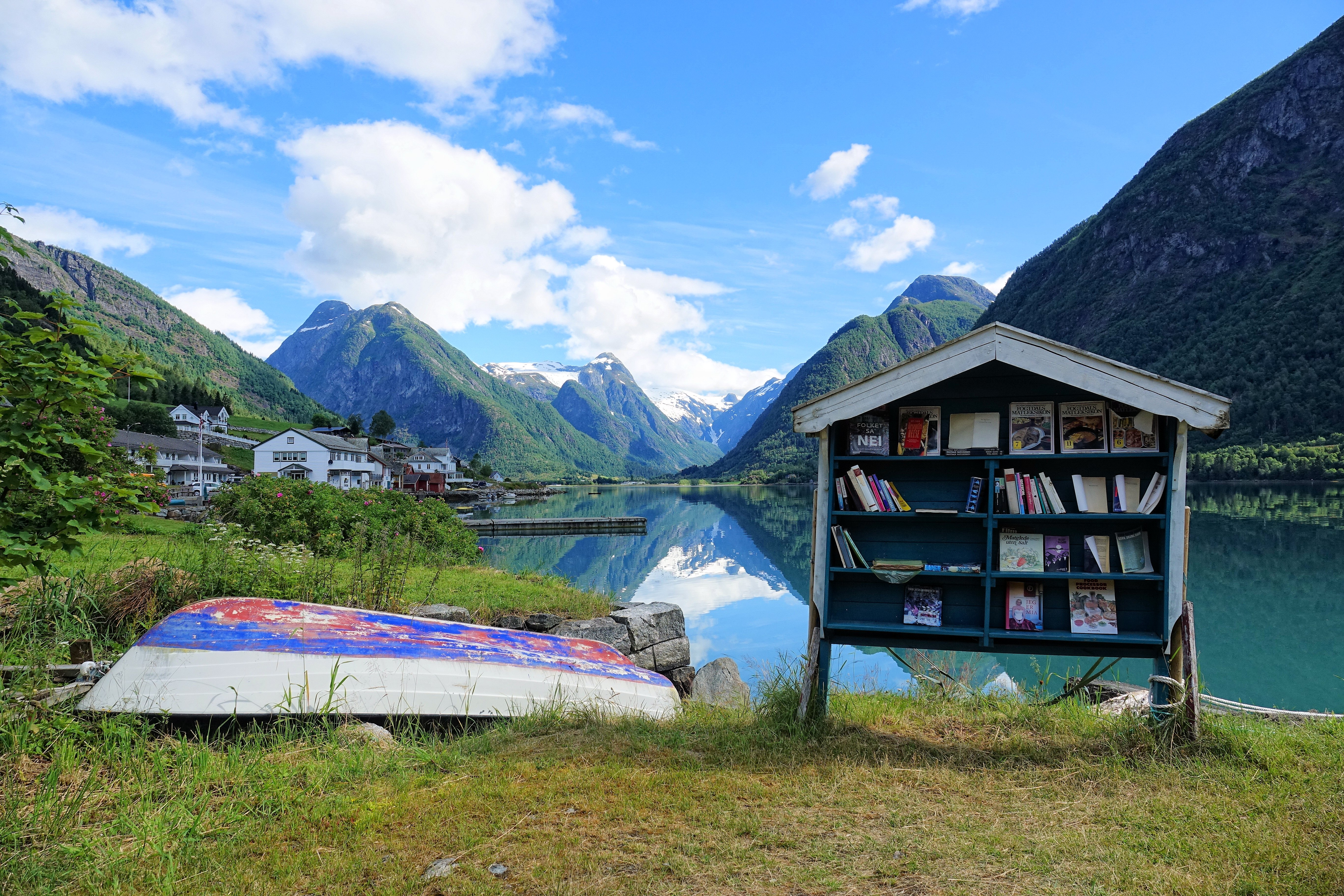
- The Fjærland book town
- Interactive map of Fjærland
- Location within Vestland Location within Norway
- Coordinates: 61.40391°N 6.74007°E
- Country: Norway
- Region: Western Norway
- County: Vestland
- District: Sogn
- Municipality: Sogndal Municipality
- Elevation: 3 m (9.8 ft)
- Time zone: UTC+01:00 (CET)
  - Summer (DST): UTC+02:00 (CEST)
- Post Code: 6848 Fjærland

Fjærland is a village in Sogndal Municipality, at the end of the Fjærlandsfjorden, in Vestland county, Norway. The Fjærlandfjorden is a branch going north off the Sognefjorden, the longest fjord in Norway. The village area is located about 31 kilometres (19 mi) northwest of the village of Sogndalsfjøra, along the Norwegian National Road 5. The village and its surrounding area encompass rich farming country, including the nearby areas of Bøyum and Oygard.

== History ==
Fjærland was originally part of Leikanger Municipality, but in 1849 it was transferred to the newly created Balestrand Municipality. Historically, the only transportation to Fjærland had been by ferry along the Fjærlandsfjorden.

In 1986, the Fjærland Tunnel was opened, by Walter Mondale, connecting Fjærland to the village of Skei in neighboring Jølster Municipality to the northwest.

In 1994, the Frudal Tunnel was opened to the southeast which connected Fjærland to the village of Sogndalsfjøra in neighboring Sogndal Municipality. These tunnels are now the best access from the large district of Norway's west coast toward the capital, Oslo.

The completion of the Frudal Tunnel was the main reason why the Fjærland area left Balestrand municipality and merged into Sogndal Municipality on 1 January 2000.

== Attractions ==
The glacier arms Bøyabreen and Supphellebreen (a part of the Jostedalsbreen glacier) and the Norwegian Glacier Museum are located nearby.

Fjærland is also the Norwegian book town, with book shops situated in old cow sheds and pigpens; there are also book shops on the ferry quay and in the Hotel Mundal.

The Hotel Mundal is an old wooden building in 19th-century style still in business as a hotel. The hotel was owned by the Orheim family for over a hundred years, until August 2008, when it was sold.

Fjærland Church is located in the village, serving the whole Fjærland area.

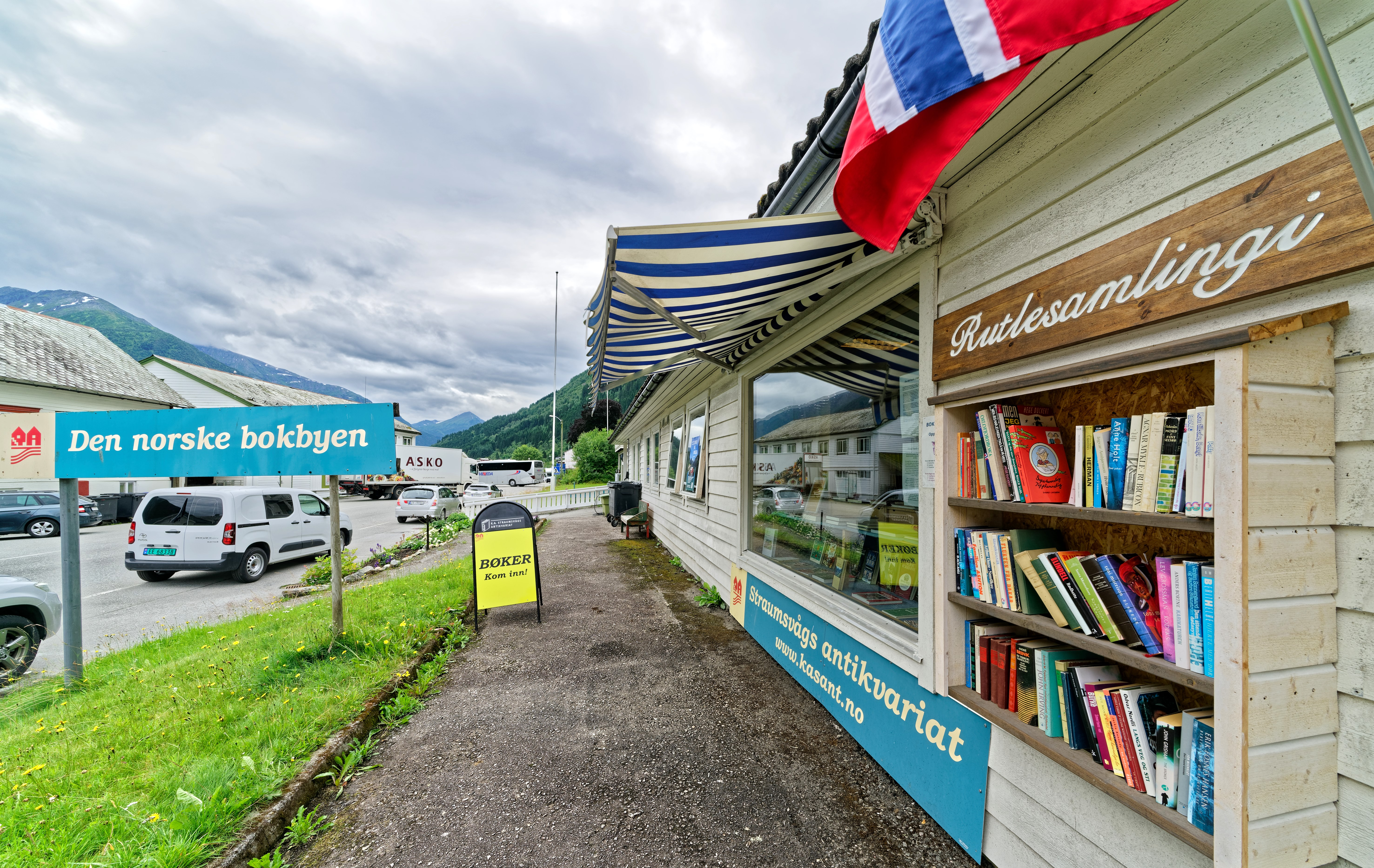
Book store

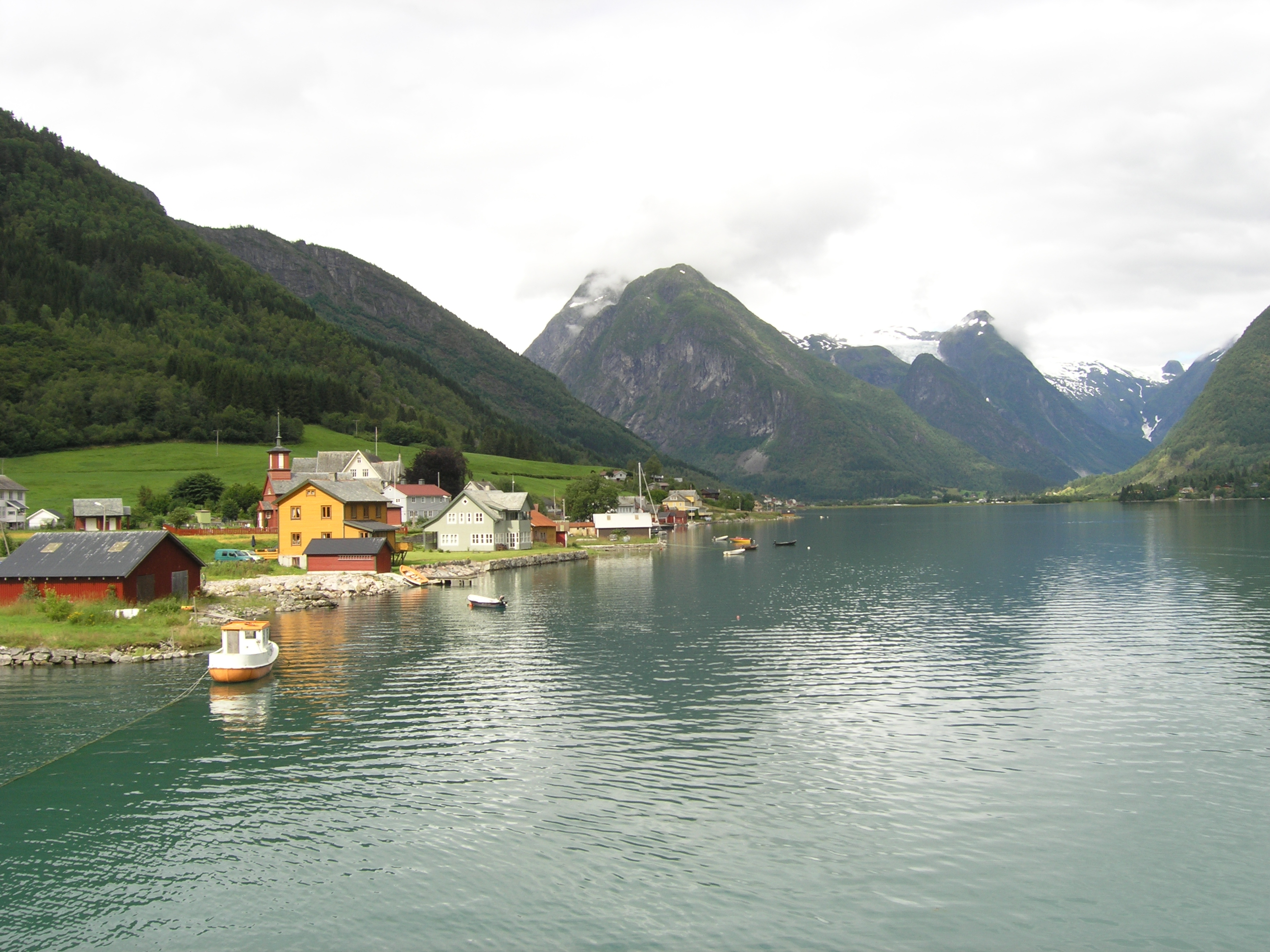
Shoreline

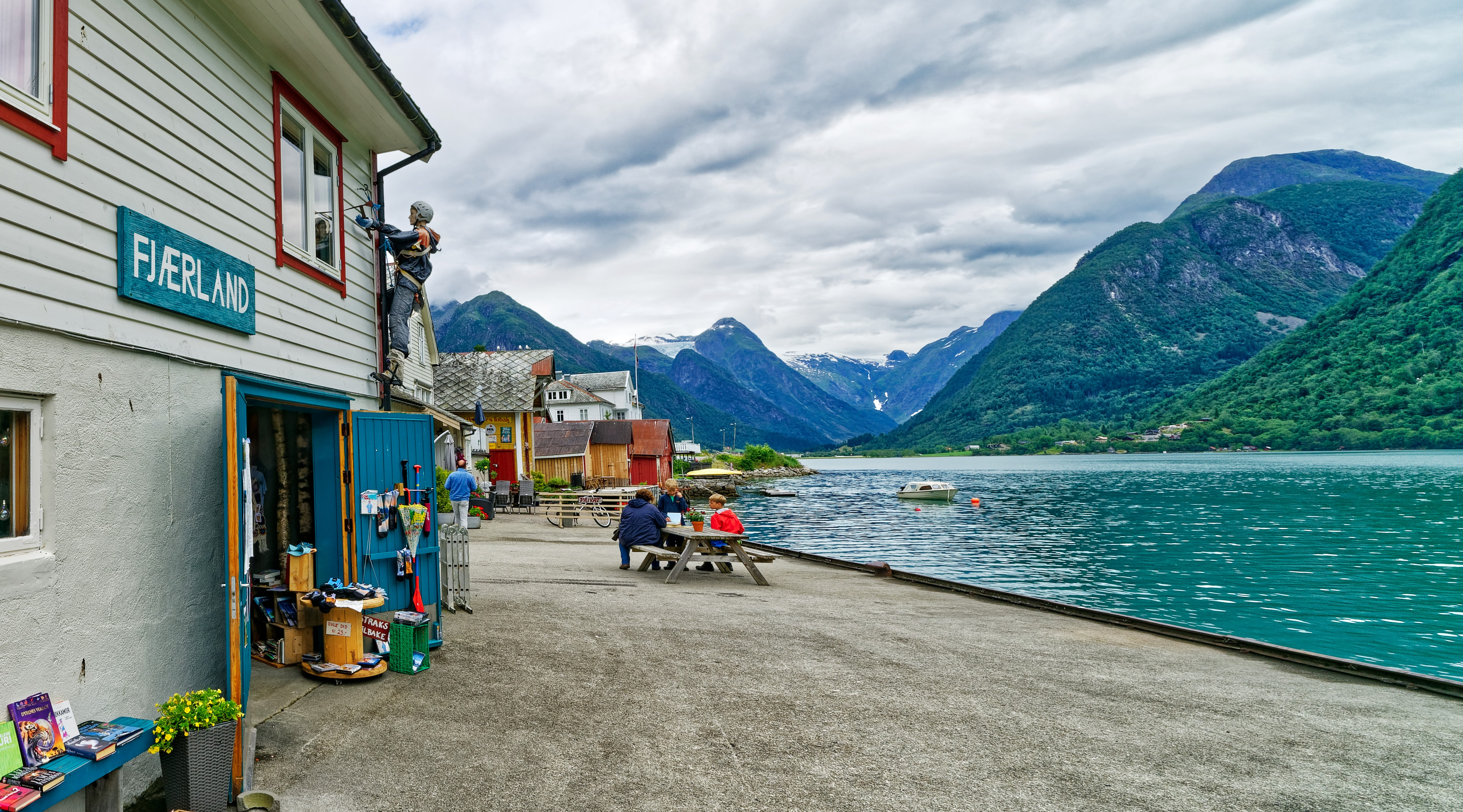

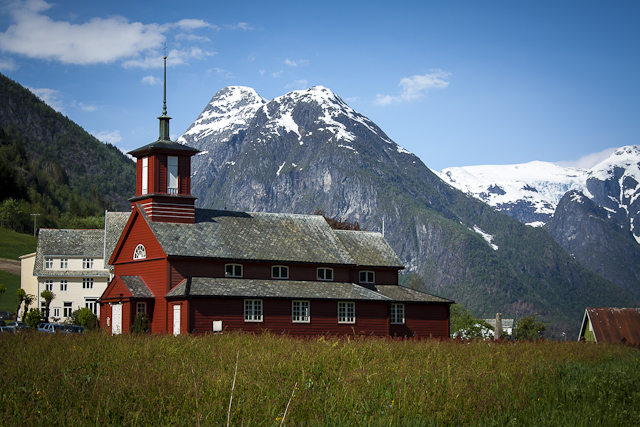
Fjærland Church

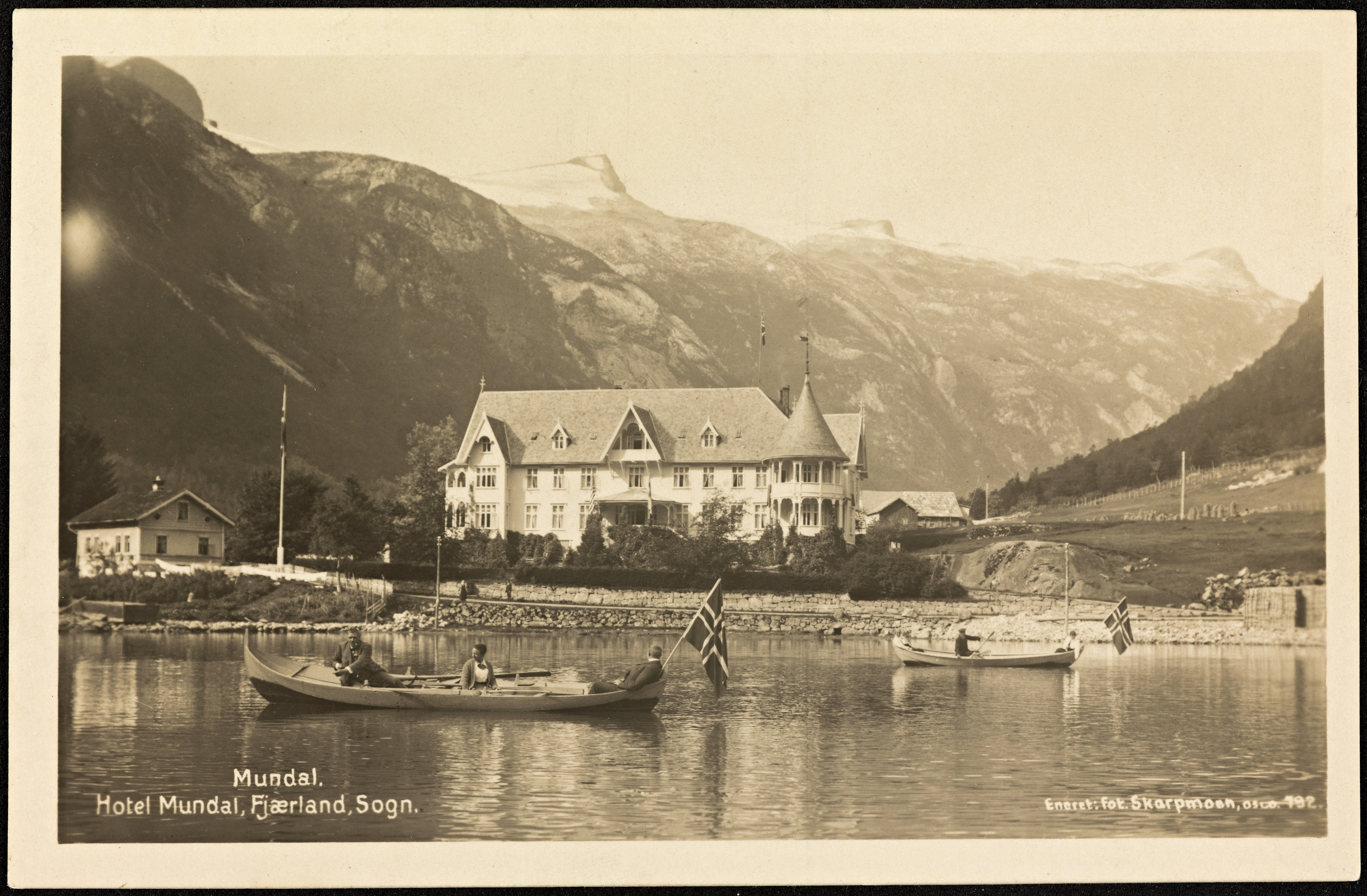
Hotel Mundal

== Climate ==
Climate data for Fjærland, Sogndal (2002–2020 averages; extremes since 1938)
| Month | Jan | Feb | Mar | Apr | May | Jun | Jul | Aug | Sep | Oct | Nov | Dec | Year |
|---|---|---|---|---|---|---|---|---|---|---|---|---|---|
| Record high °C (°F) | 14.8 (58.6) | 12.0 (53.6) | 14.1 (57.4) | 21.6 (70.9) | 28.7 (83.7) | 30.8 (87.4) | 33.9 (93.0) | 32.8 (91.0) | 24.2 (75.6) | 21.5 (70.7) | 15.7 (60.3) | 13.5 (56.3) | 33.9 (93.0) |
| Mean maximum °C (°F) | 7.7 (45.9) | 7.7 (45.9) | 10.3 (50.5) | 16.7 (62.1) | 23.2 (73.8) | 26.4 (79.5) | 28.6 (83.5) | 26.0 (78.8) | 21.3 (70.3) | 15.6 (60.1) | 11.9 (53.4) | 9.1 (48.4) | 29.2 (84.6) |
| Mean daily maximum °C (°F) | 0.6 (33.1) | 1.6 (34.9) | 5.2 (41.4) | 10.2 (50.4) | 15.3 (59.5) | 19.4 (66.9) | 20.9 (69.6) | 19.4 (66.9) | 14.6 (58.3) | 9.2 (48.6) | 4.2 (39.6) | 1.4 (34.5) | 10.2 (50.3) |
| Daily mean °C (°F) | −2.2 (28.0) | −1.8 (28.8) | 1.0 (33.8) | 5.2 (41.4) | 9.9 (49.8) | 13.8 (56.8) | 15.7 (60.3) | 14.8 (58.6) | 10.9 (51.6) | 5.8 (42.4) | 1.6 (34.9) | −1.2 (29.8) | 6.1 (43.0) |
| Mean daily minimum °C (°F) | −4.9 (23.2) | −5.1 (22.8) | −3.3 (26.1) | 0.2 (32.4) | 4.5 (40.1) | 8.1 (46.6) | 10.5 (50.9) | 10.1 (50.2) | 7.2 (45.0) | 2.4 (36.3) | −1.1 (30.0) | −3.8 (25.2) | 2.1 (35.7) |
| Mean minimum °C (°F) | −15.5 (4.1) | −16.3 (2.7) | −12.9 (8.8) | −6.3 (20.7) | −2.0 (28.4) | 2.4 (36.3) | 4.7 (40.5) | 3.6 (38.5) | 0.4 (32.7) | −5.3 (22.5) | −8.6 (16.5) | −13.3 (8.1) | −18.6 (−1.5) |
| Record low °C (°F) | −27.0 (−16.6) | −23.0 (−9.4) | −22.5 (−8.5) | −16.6 (2.1) | −5.7 (21.7) | −0.9 (30.4) | 0.7 (33.3) | 0.3 (32.5) | −3.0 (26.6) | −15.5 (4.1) | −18.5 (−1.3) | −22.5 (−8.5) | −27.0 (−16.6) |
| Average precipitation mm (inches) | 211.8 (8.34) | 151.4 (5.96) | 162.1 (6.38) | 97.6 (3.84) | 87.3 (3.44) | 82.8 (3.26) | 102.8 (4.05) | 123.5 (4.86) | 204.6 (8.06) | 209.1 (8.23) | 214.7 (8.45) | 250.7 (9.87) | 1,898.4 (74.74) |
Source: Norsk Klimaservicesenter

== Notable people ==
The paternal grandparents of Walter Mondale, Vice President of the United States from 1977 to 1981 and the Democratic Party's nominee for President in 1984, were born in Mundal in Fjærland. It is common in Norway that surnames come from the name of the original home place.
