= Fjærlandsfjorden =

Fjord in Sogndal, Norway

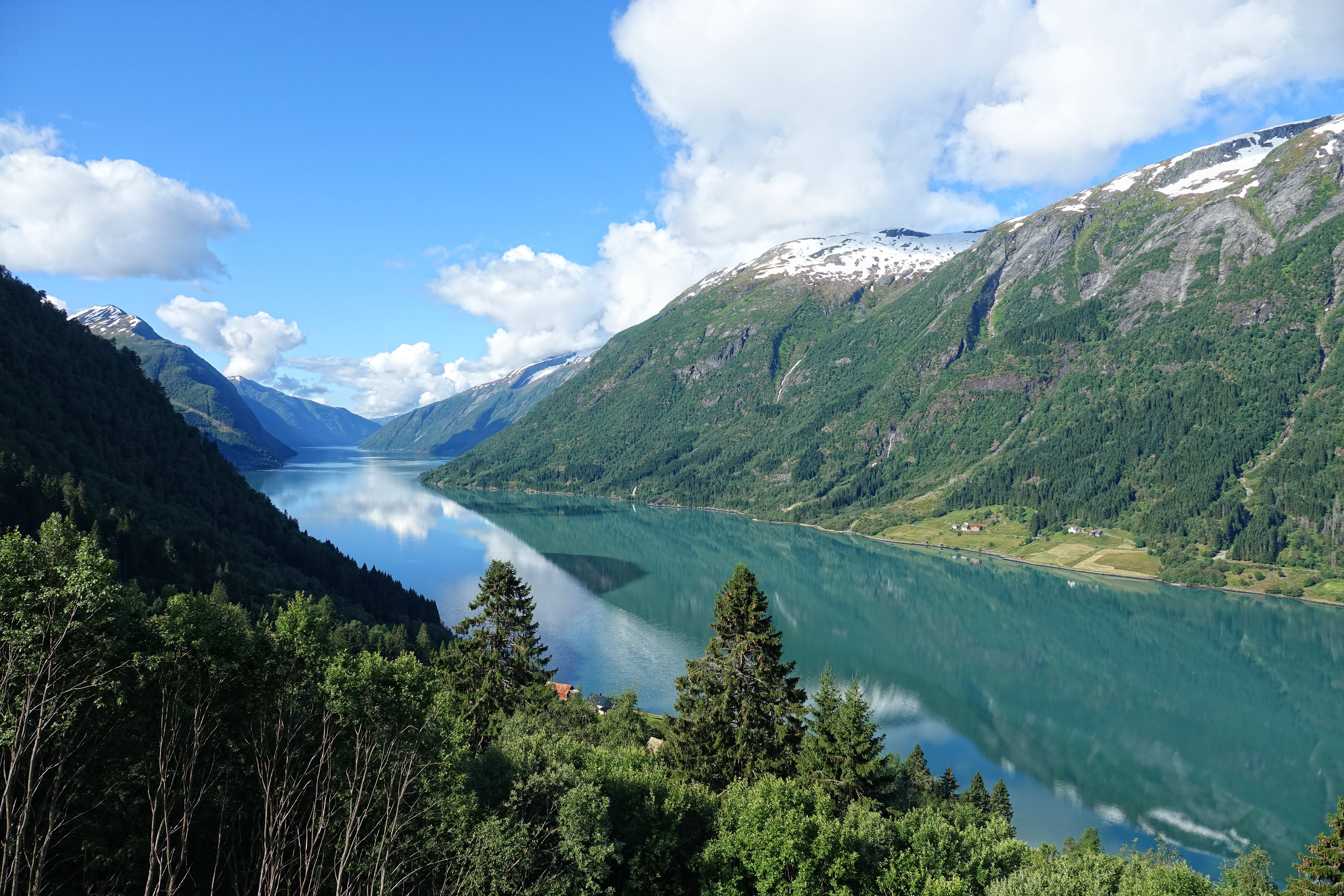
- View of the fjord from north to south
- Interactive map of the fjord
- Location: Vestland county, Norway
- Coordinates: 61.4042°N 6.7517°E
- Type: Fjord
- Primary outflows: Sognefjorden
- Basin countries: Norway
- Max. length: 25 kilometres (16 mi)
- Max. width: 1.5 kilometres (0.93 mi)
- Settlements: Balestrand, Fjærland

Fjærlandsfjorden is a fjord in Sogndal Municipality in Vestland county, Norway. It is a fjord arm that branches off the main Sognefjorden to the north. The 25-kilometre (16 mi) long fjord begins at the village of Fjærland, flowing to the south until it joins the Sognefjorden near the village of Balestrand. The Esefjorden and Vetlefjorden are two small fjord arms that branch off the Fjærdlandsfjorden.

The fjord is about 1.5 kilometres (0.93 mi) wide, with steep mountains on both sides of the fjord. The head of the fjord is the only habitable area around the fjord. It is a flat river valley extending north of the fjord. The inner part of the fjord where the village of Fjærland is located is only accessible by boat or via long road tunnels through the surrounding mountains. The western end of the Frudal Tunnel sits very near the shore of the fjord.

== Gallery ==
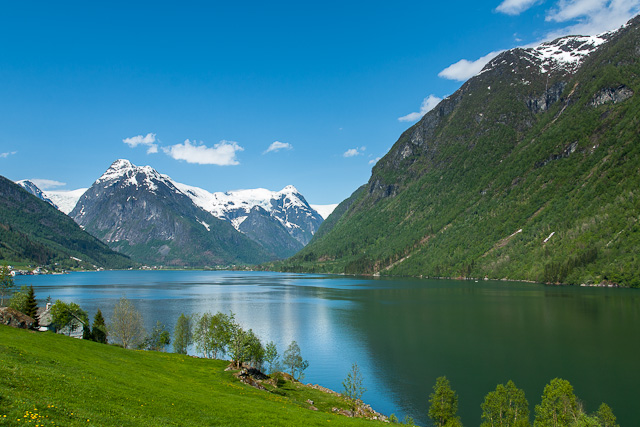
Looking north from sea level

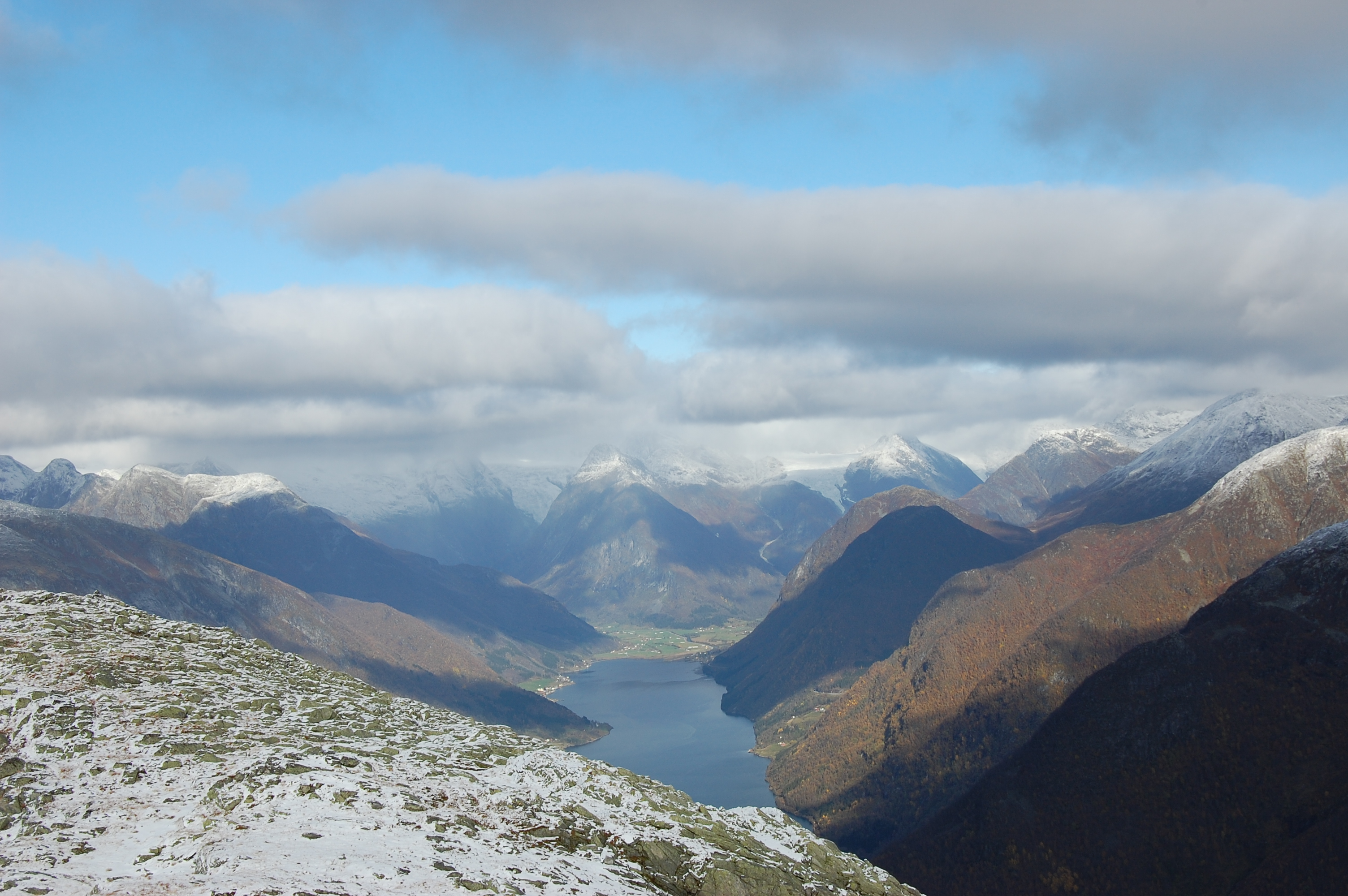
Looking north from atop a mountain

== See also ==
- List of Norwegian fjords
