= Bøyabreen =

Glacier in Vestland, Norway

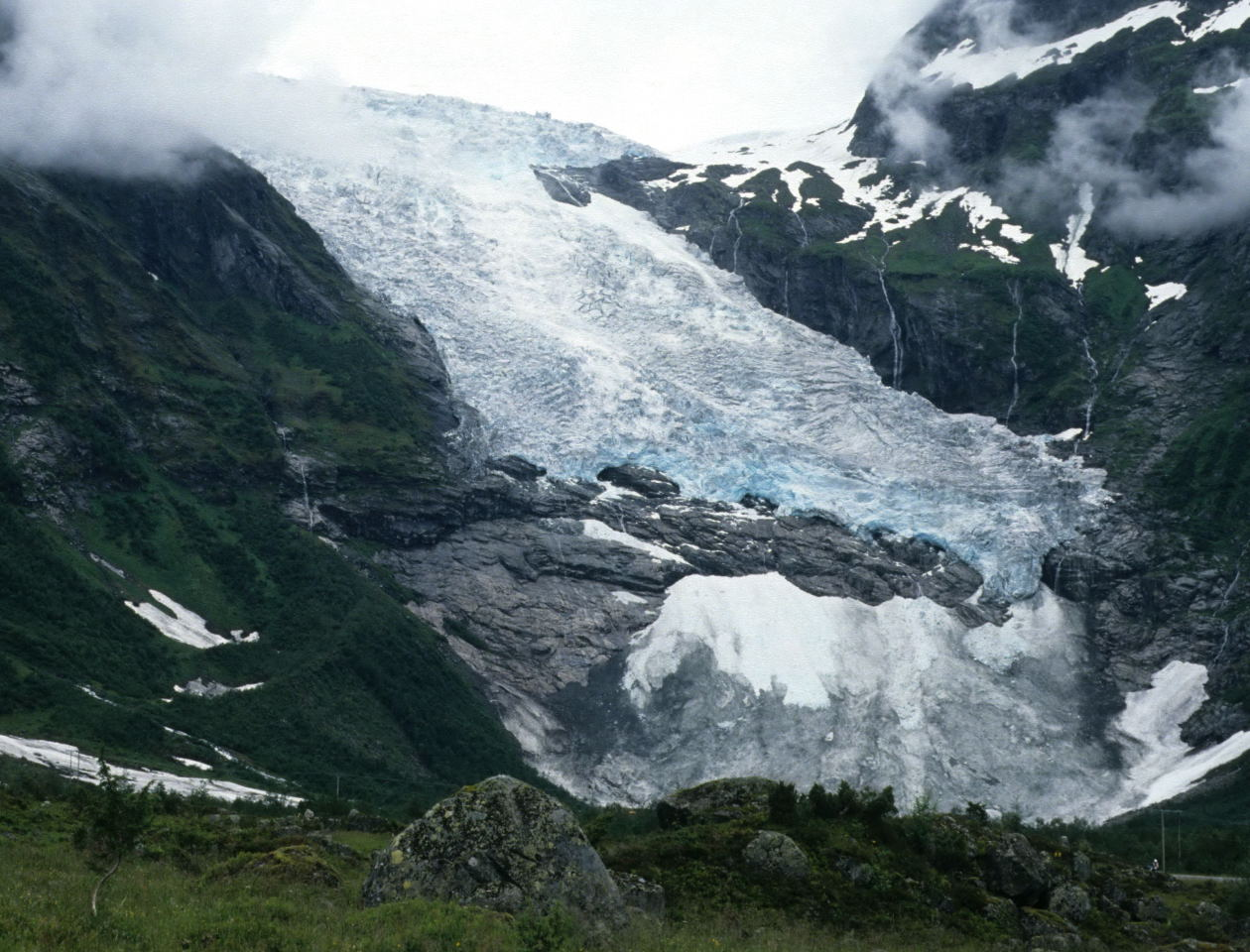
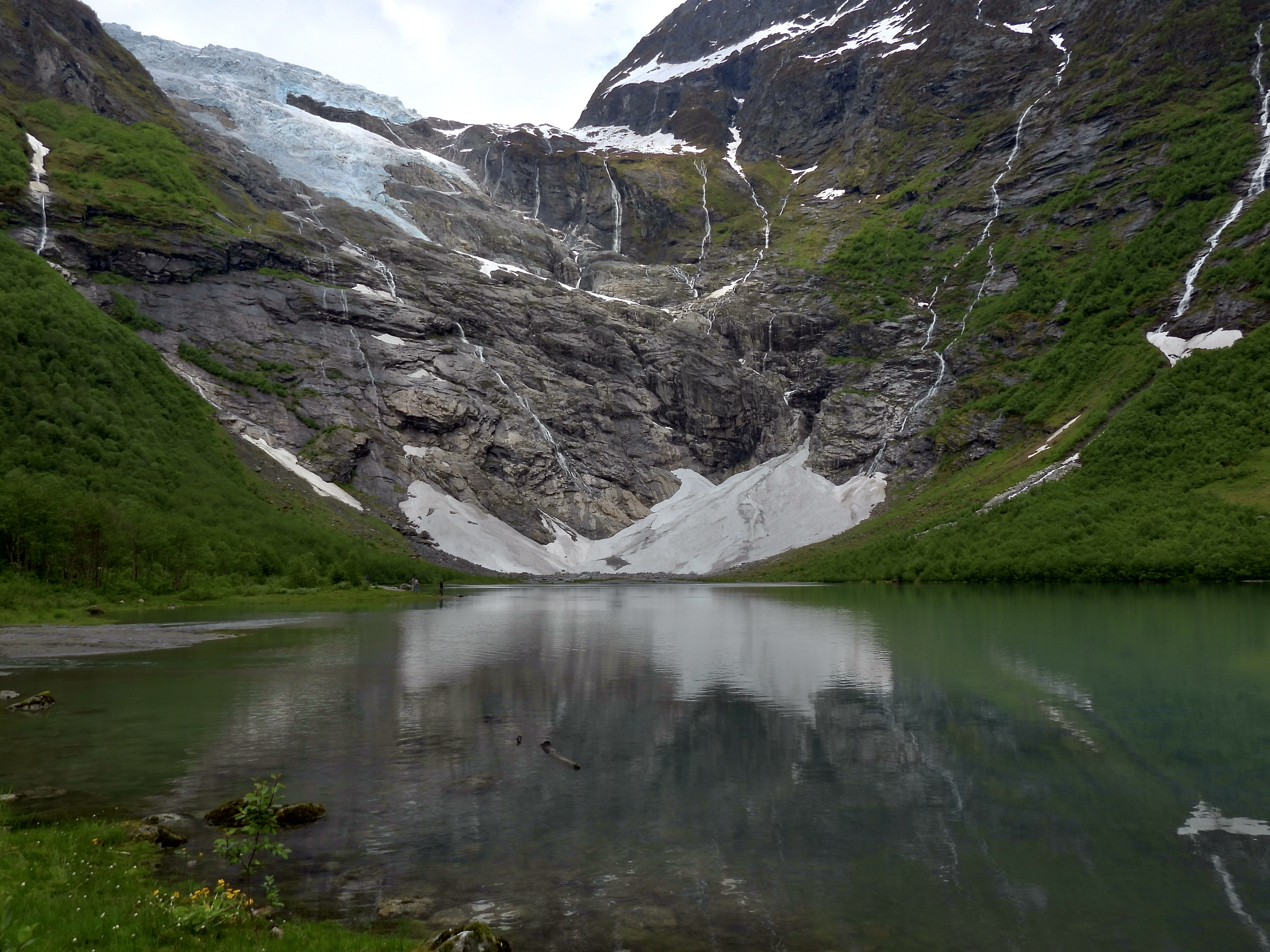
- View of Bøyabreen The Bøyabreen Glacial melt waters form a reflective glacial lagoon as the sounds of a hundred waterfalls echo in every direction
- Interactive map of Bøyabreen
- Location: Vestland, Norway
- Coordinates: 61.50643°N 6.75893°E
- Highest elevation: 1,700 metres (5,600 ft)
- Lowest elevation: 300 metres (980 ft)

Bøyabreen is a glacier in the Fjærland area of Sogndal Municipality in Vestland county, Norway. It is located inside Jostedalsbreen National Park, and it is a side branch of the large Jostedalsbreen glacier.

== See also ==
- List of glaciers in Norway
