= Frudal Tunnel =

Road tunnel in Norway

Frudal Tunnel Frudalstunnelen
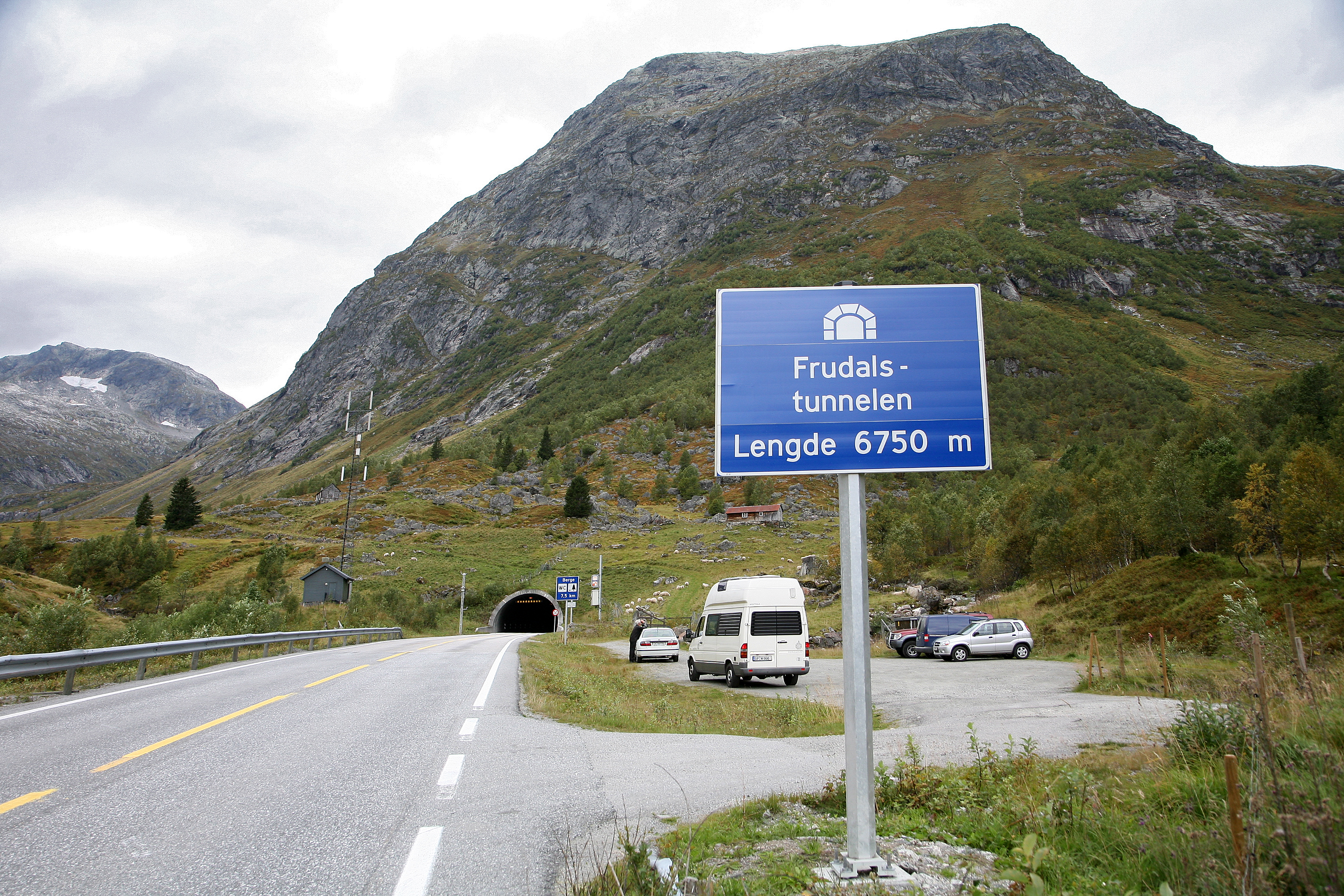
- View of the entrance to the Frudal Tunnel
- Interactive map of Frudal Tunnel; Frudalstunnelen

Overview
- Location: Vestland, Norway
- Coordinates: 61.3629°N 6.8221°E
- Status: In use
- Route: Rv5
- Start: Frudalen
- End: Berge

Operation
- Opened: 1994
- Operator: Statens vegvesen
- Traffic: Automotive

Technical
- Length: 6,758 metres (22,172 ft)
- No. of lanes: 2

The Frudal Tunnel (Norwegian: Frudalstunnelen) is a road tunnel along Norwegian National Road 5 in Sogndal Municipality in Vestland county, Norway. The tunnel is approximately 6,758 metres (4.199 mi) long, starting at the Frudalen farm, passing through the mountains under the Frudalsbreen glacier, and exiting at the Berge farm area. The tunnel was inaugurated on 29 October 1994.

Prior to the construction of the Frudal Tunnel, the Fjærland area was a fairly isolated part of Balestrand Municipality which residents had to use a ferry to reach the rest of Balestrand (or use a road to connect to Jølster Municipality to the north). After the completion of the tunnel, the residents were then connected to the more urban Sogndal Municipality by a highway. Due to this change, the local residents requested a municipal border change to move the whole Fjærland area into Sogndal Municipality. This border change took place on 1 January 2000.
