= Sogndalsfjøra =

Village in Sogndal Municipality, Norway

Sogndalsfjøra Sogndal
- Village
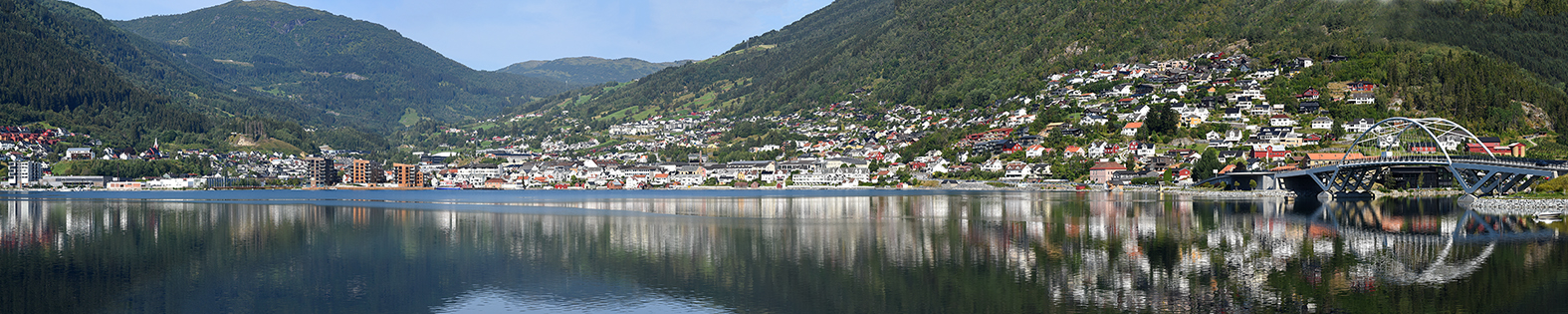
- Sogndalsfjøra, Photo by Vadim Chuprina 2024
- Interactive map of Sogndalsfjøra; Sogndal
- Location within Vestland Location within Norway
- Coordinates: 61.22883°N 7.09645°E
- Country: Norway
- Region: Western Norway
- County: Vestland
- District: Sogn
- Municipality: Sogndal Municipality

Area
  - Total: 2.11 km^{2} (0.81 sq mi)
- Elevation: 5 m (16 ft)

Population (2025)
  - Total: 4,475
  - Density: 2,121/km^{2} (5,490/sq mi)
- Time zone: UTC+01:00 (CET)
  - Summer (DST): UTC+02:00 (CEST)
- Post Code: 6856 Sogndal

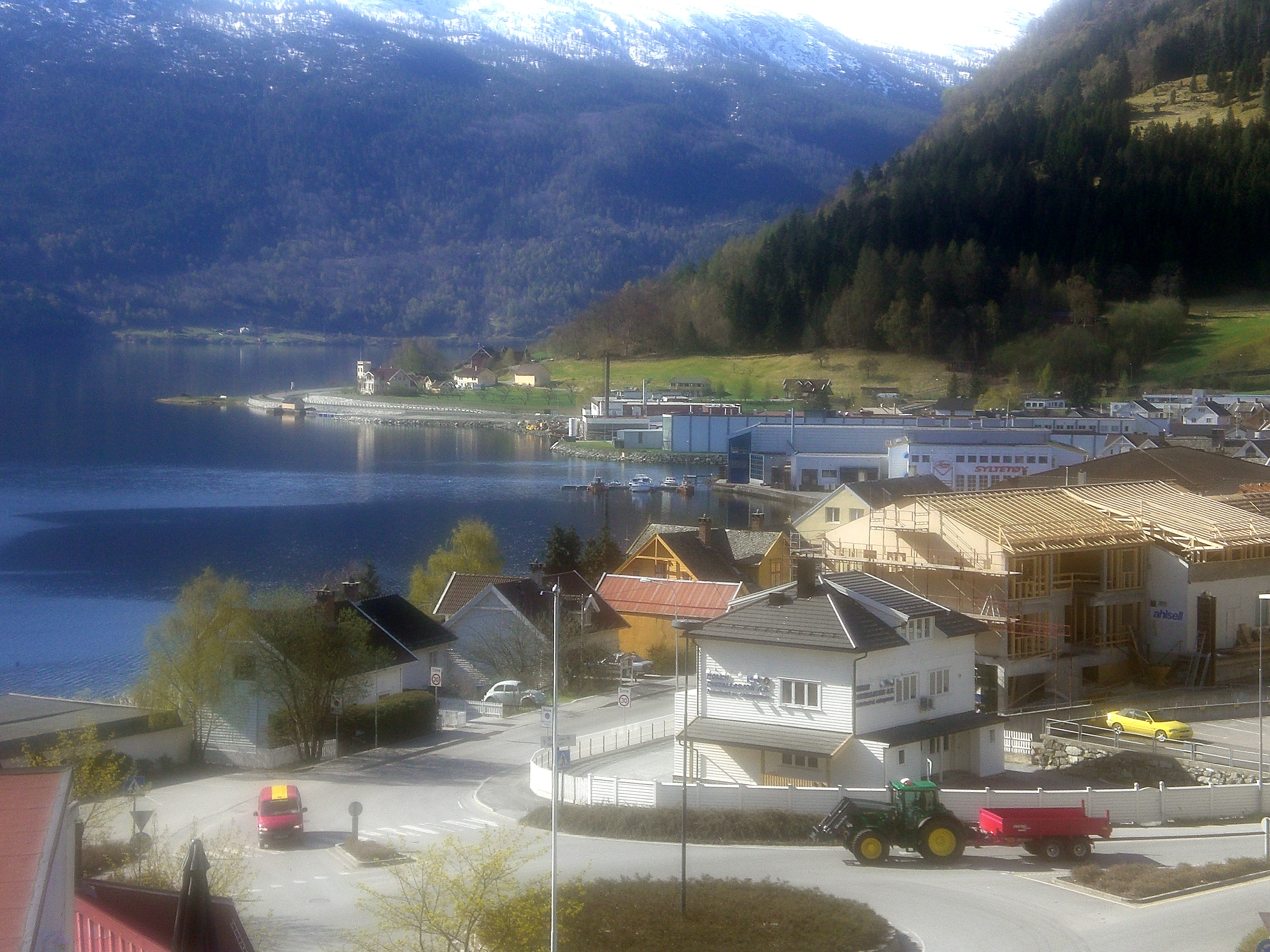
Sogndalsfjøra. View of the village in April 2007

Sogndalsfjøra or Sogndal is a large village in Sogndal Municipality in Vestland county, Norway. It is located where the river Sogndalselvi runs out in the Sogndalsfjorden, a branch of the large Sognefjorden. The village is located about 3.5 kilometres (2.2 mi) northwest of the village of Kjørnes, about 10 kilometres (6.2 mi) northwest of the village of Kaupanger, and about 31 kilometres (19 mi) southeast of the village of Fjærland. The village sits at the intersection of Norwegian National Road 5 and Norwegian County Road 55.

The 2.11-square-kilometre (520-acre) village has a population (2025) of 4,475 and a population density of 2,121 inhabitants per square kilometre (5,490/sq mi).

Sogndalsfjøra is home to the association football team Sogndal Fotball. The team is in the Norwegian Premier League, Tippeligaen and plays at the Fosshaugane Campus. The area is home to major tourism industries, along with sawmills, lumber production, and a slaughterhouse. The Lerum Konserves, the largest Norwegian producer of juice and jam, is located here. Sogndalsfjøra is also the home of the regional police station for inner Sogn. Stedje Church is located in the village. The village has also an active academic environment and is home to one of the five campuses of the Western Norway University of Applied Sciences and Western Norway Research Institute.

== History ==
The bridge in the village was replaced in 2018 after the old structure from 1954 showed signs of ageing.

This village was the administrative center of Sogndal Municipality until 2020 when the municipality was enlarged and the administrative centre was moved to Leikanger-Hermansverk.
