= Norwegian National Road 5 =

National road in Norway

National Road 5
- Bokmål: Riksvei 5 Nynorsk: Riksveg 5

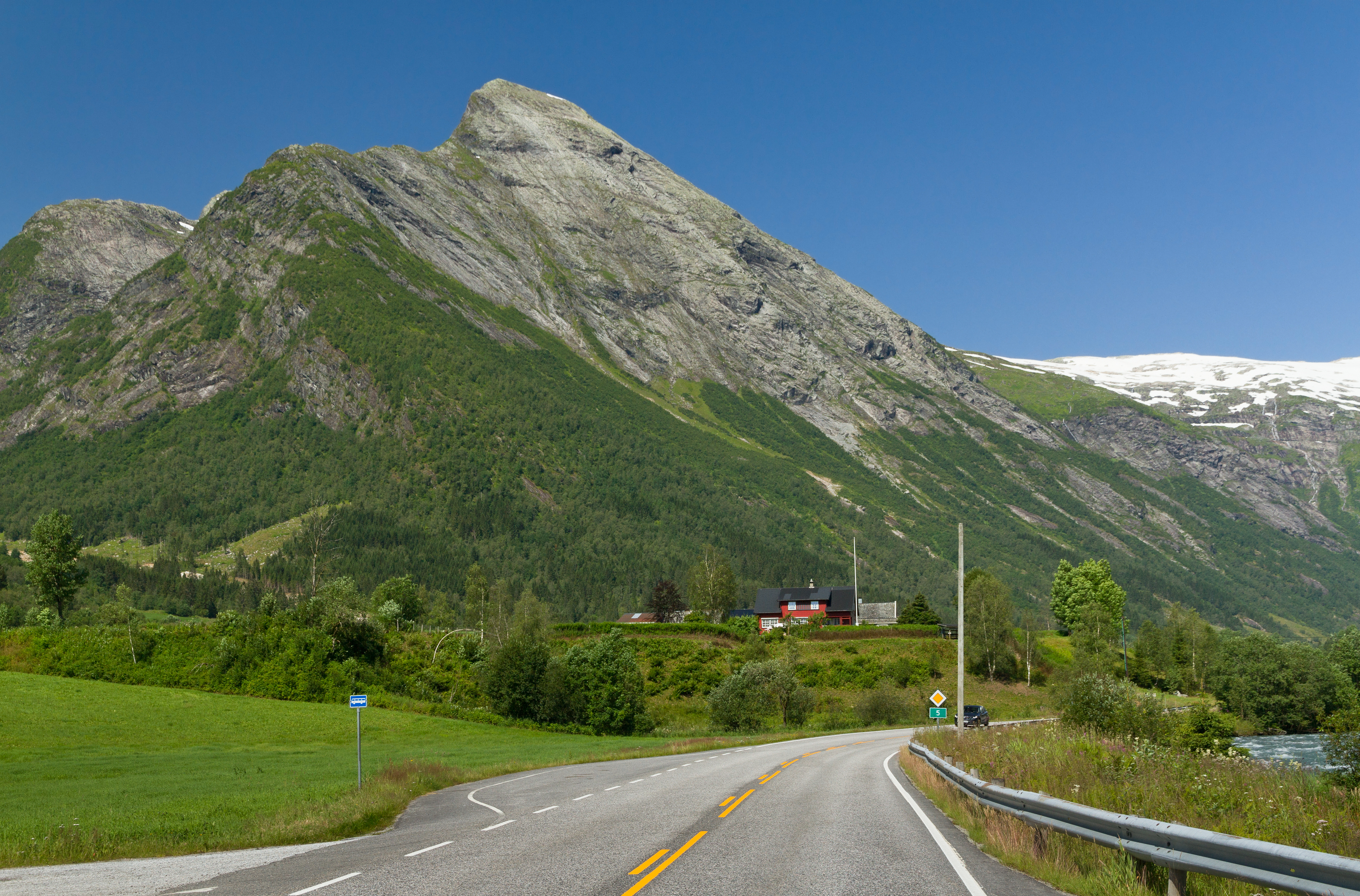
- View of the road in Sogndal

Route information
- Length: 190 km (120 mi)

Major junctions
- From: Florø, Kinn Municipality, Vestland
- E39; Rv13; E16
- To: Lærdal Municipality, Vestland

Location
- Country: Norway

Highway system
- Roads in Norway; National Roads; County Roads
← Rv4	→ Rv7

Norwegian National Road 5 (Norwegian: Riksvei 5, Rv5) is a national road in Vestland county, Norway. It runs between the town of Florø in Kinn Municipality to just south of Lærdalsøyri in Lærdal Municipality.

Starting where the European route E16 highway enters the Lærdal Tunnel, approximately 5 kilometres (3.1 mi) south of Lærdalsøyri, the road goes northwest to Sogndalsfjøra and Fjærland and from there north to Skei and on to the sea where it ends at the town of Florø.
