= Castberg =

Castberg is a Norwegian surname. Notable people with the surname include:

- Frede Castberg (1893–1977), Norwegian jurist
- Johan Castberg (1862–1926), Norwegian jurist and politician
- Johan Christian Castberg (1911–1988), Norwegian illustrator and painter
- Johan Christian Tandberg Castberg (1827–1899), Norwegian politician
- Leif Castberg (1876–1950), Norwegian lawyer and politician
- Oscar Castberg (1846–1917), Norwegian painter and sculptor
- Peter Atke Castberg (1779–1823), Danish professor
- Peter Harboe Castberg (banker) (1844–1926), Norwegian banker
- Peter Hersleb Harboe Castberg (1794–1858), Norwegian priest and politician
- Torgrim Castberg (1874–1928), Norwegian violinist
