= Leif Castberg =

Norwegian lawyer and politician

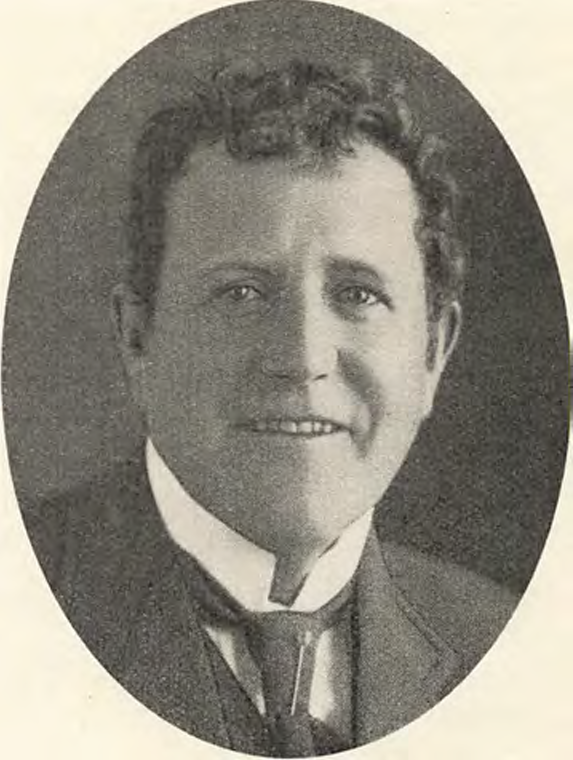
Portrait of Leif Castberg

Leif Castberg (23 April 1876 – 3 March 1950) was a Norwegian lawyer and politician for the Radical People's Party and the Conservative Party.

== Personal life ==
He was born in Skien as a son of customs surveyor and politician Johan Christian Tandberg Castberg (1827–1899) and his wife Hanna Magdalene Frisak Ebbesen (1839–1881). He had several brothers and sisters, including the politician Johan Castberg and violinist Torgrim Castberg.

Through Johan he was an uncle of law professor Frede Castberg, and through Torgrim he was an uncle of illustrator Johan Christian Castberg. He was a first cousin of sculptor Oscar Ambrosius Castberg, and his paternal grandfather Peter Hersleb Harboe Castberg was a priest and politician. On the maternal side he was a grandson of Jørgen Tandberg Ebbesen and nephew of Just Bing Ebbesen, both of whom were involved in politics too.

In 1900 he married Sigrid Flood; the marriage lasted until 1913. From 1921 he was married to Else Lingjerde.

== Career ==
He finished his secondary education in 1894 and graduated from the Royal Frederick University with the cand.jur. degree in 1900. He settled in Gjøvik as an attorney in 1901, and was a public defender from 1918. He chaired the regional branch of the Norwegian Bar Association from 1926 to 1936.

Castberg was known as a politician. As a member of Gjøvik city council from 1908 to 1940 he served as mayor in 1908 and from 1910 to 1916. He was a member of Gjøvik school board and the Dovre Line supervisory committee. In business and industry, he was a board member of Gjøvik Støperi & Mekaniske Verksted from 1927, Hunton Bruk from 1932 and Nordgaard & Co from 1933.
