= Knagenhjelm (noble family) =

- Nobility
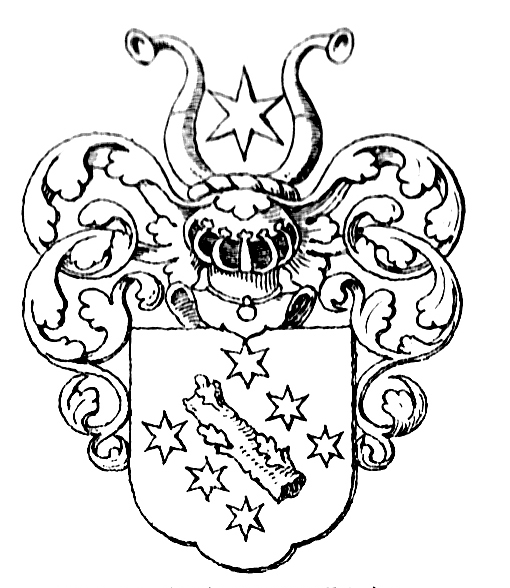
- Knagenhjelm coat of arms
- Country: Norway; Denmark
- Place of origin: Sogndal
- Founded: 21 December 1721
- Founder: Niels Knagenhielm
- Seat: Kaupanger Manor
- Estates: Kaupanger (former); Sogndalsfjøra (former)

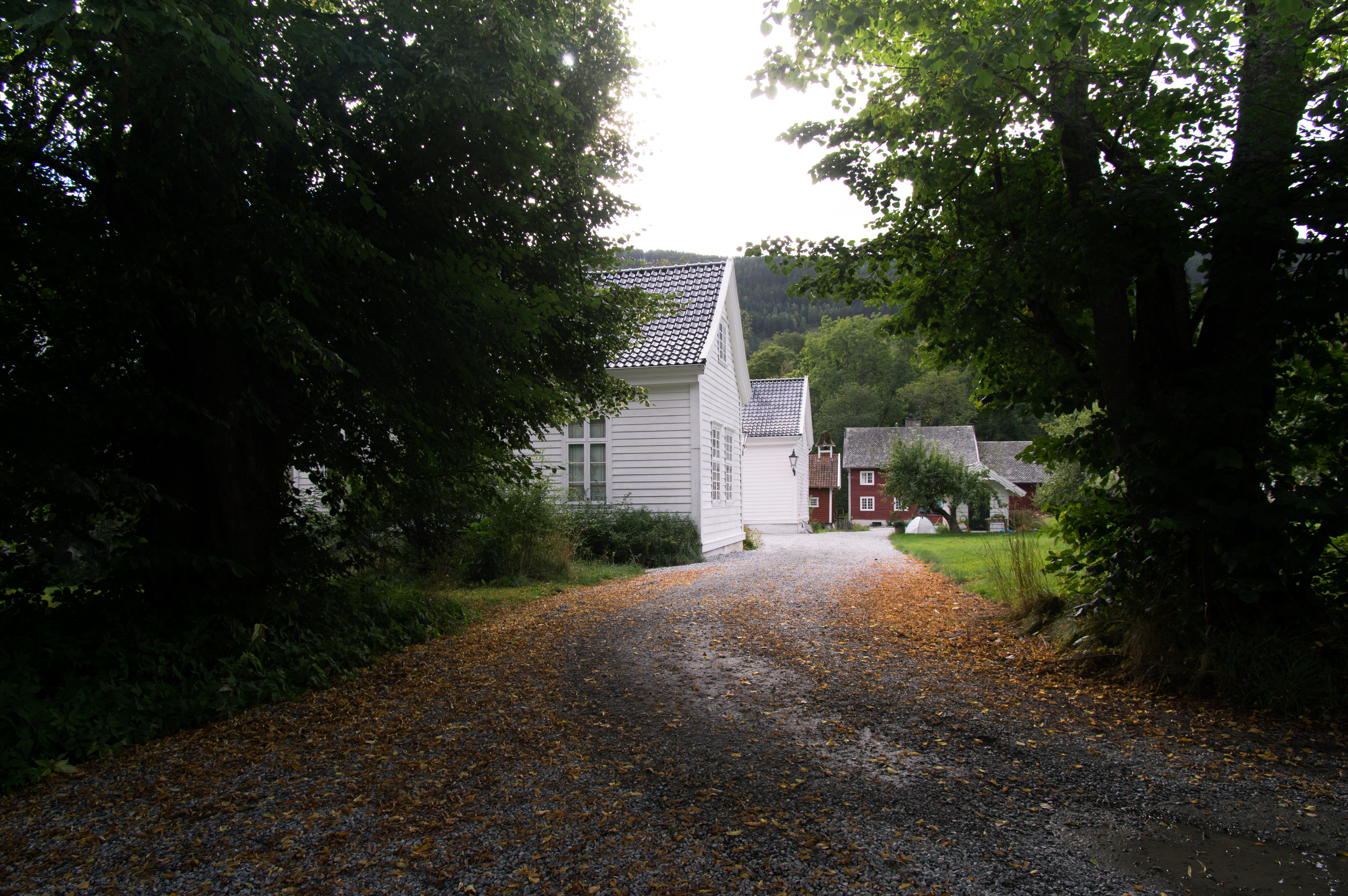
Kaupanger Manor in Sogndal

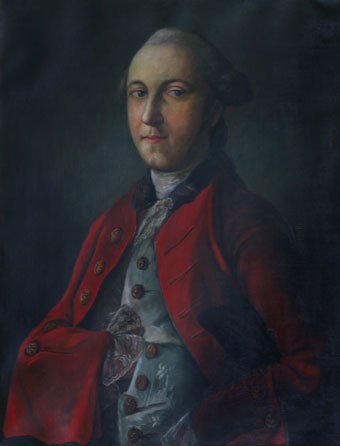
Joachim de Knagenhielm (1727–1796)

The Knagenhjelm family (also spelled Knagenhielm in Denmark, often romanised Knagenhelm ) is a Danish and Norwegian noble family originating in Norway.

== Origin ==
The family descends from Niels Tygesen Knag (1661–1737) (later Niels Tygesen Knagenhielm), who was an attorney and lagmann of the Bergen appeals court. He grew in wealth and owned the estates of Kaupanger (Kaupanger Hovedgård) and Stedje (Storgarden Stedje) in the present-day Sogndal Municipality plus an estate on the island of Losna (Losna-ætta) in the present-day Hyllestad Municipality. Niels Tygesen Knag was the son of district magistrate Tyge Nielssøn Castberg (ca. 1610–1687) from Kalø in Jutland and Maren Nielsdatter Knag, the daughter of Niels Knag, district magistrate on Sunnmøre. The current Norwegian family Castberg also descends from this couple.

The surname Knagenhielm was granted when on 21 December 1721, Niels Tygesen Knag was ennobled by King Christian VI. He married twice, first in 1695 with Abel Margrethe Hansdatter (1676–1701), daughter of customs official Hans Clausen and Ingeborg Lem, and in 1702 Veronica Elisabeth Hiort (d. 1713), daughter of Hans Christoffersen Hiorth (d. 1692), Nordenfjells country commissioner. He had descent through his first marriage including his grandson, Joachim de Knagenhielm (1727–1796) who served as County Governor of Nordre Bergenhus (1763–1771) and of Nordland (1771–1789). Knagenhielm descendants still own Kaupanger Manor (Kaupanger Hovedgård) in Sogndal Municipality and are included in the Yearbook of the Danish Nobility (Danmarks Adels Aarbog).

== Coat of arms ==
Before he became noble, Niels Tygesen Knag had only a tree trunk as his arms (Hans Krag. 1942). The coat of arms was received upon the ennoblement in 1721. Description without the heraldic terminology: On a blue shield a tilted, chopped and knotty silver tree trunk beside or above which there are three golden stars in each of two bends. On the helmet is a six-pointed star between two buffalo horns divided in gold and blue, vice versa, respectively. Some family members use also an oak leaf on the tree trunk.

== See also ==
- Danish nobility
- Norwegian nobility

== Literature and sources ==
- A.W. Rasch (1910): Slægten Knagenhjelm og dens jordegods
- A.W. Rasch & Ole Henrik Moe (1960): Slekten Knagenhjelm og Kaupanger
- Haagen Krog Steffens (1912): Norske Slægter
- Hans Krag (1942): Norsk heraldisk mønstring fra Frederik IVs regjeringstid 1699-1730
- Hans Cappelen (1969): Norske slektsvåpen, p. 142-143
- Herman Leopoldus Løvenskiold (1978): Heraldisk nøkkel
- Harald Nissen & Monica Aase (1990): Segl i Universitetsbiblioteket i Trondheim
