= Ebbesen =

Ebbesen is a Danish-Norwegian patronymic surname meaning "son of Ebbe". Notable people with the surname include:

- Dagmar Ebbesen (1891–1954), Swedish actress
- Elsa Ebbesen (1890–1977), Swedish actress
- Eskild Ebbesen (born 1972), Danish rower
- Jørgen Tandberg Ebbesen (1812–1887), Norwegian politician
- Joseph B. Ebbesen (1925–2014), American politician and optometrist
- Just Bing Ebbesen (1847–1929), Norwegian priest and politician
- Margunn Ebbesen (born 1962), Norwegian politician
- Niels Ebbesen (1308–1340), Danish squire and national hero
- Niels Ebbesen Hansen (1866–1950), Danish-American horticulturist, botanist and agronomist
- Samuel E. Ebbesen (born 1938), American lieutenant general
- Thomas Ebbesen (born 1954), Norwegian physical chemist
- Torben Ebbesen (born 1945), Danish sculptor and painter

== See also ==
- HDMS Niels Ebbesen (F339) or HMS Annan (K404), was a Ship of the Royal Canadian Navy
