= Peter Harboe Castberg =

Peter Harboe Castberg may refer to:

- Peter Hersleb Harboe Castberg (1794–1858), Norwegian priest and politician
- Peter Harboe Castberg (banker) (1844–1926), Norwegian banker
