= Peter Harboe Castberg (banker) =

Norwegian banker

Peter Harboe Castberg (2 October 1844 – 18 November 1926) was a Norwegian banker.

== Personal life ==
He was born in Larvik, Norway. His father, physician Tycho Fredrik Edvard Castberg, was the oldest living son of Peter Hersleb Harboe Castberg. As such Peter Harboe Castberg was the nephew of Johan Christian Tandberg Castberg and first cousin of Johan and Torgrim Castberg. In addition, Peter Harboe Castberg had one younger brother, the sculptor Oscar Ambrosius Castberg.

Peter Harboe Castberg married the English citizen Nina Benham in 1886. They had two sons, of whom one died young and one died in World War I, and one daughter.

== Career ==
Peter Harboe Castberg enrolled as a law student in 1862, but as he was later hired as a stenographer in the Norwegian Parliament, he quit the studies. He worked as a stenographer from 1865 to 1867, and then embarked on a business career. He was hired in the company Ths. Johs. Heftye & Søn, but founded his own firm of agents Castberg & Michelet in 1875 together with Joh. Chr. Aug. Michelet. Already in 1879 he left the company to become director of the bank Stavanger Privatbank. After two years as a bookkeeper in Christiania Sparebank, he became the director of Christiania Bank og Kreditkasse. Serving as director from 1886 to 1919, he is credited with building up the bank as one of the leading banks in Norway. (Note: Quote: (...) bygde banken opp til å bli en av landets ledende forretningsbanker.)

Parallel to his business career, Castberg conducted military and economic studies on his own. He became known for the paper Vil Ofoten-Luleåbanen blive af nogen særegen Betydning for de forenede Rigers militære Forhold? in 1885. In 1902 he published Ældre og nyere Udtalelser vedrørende Sveriges faste Forsvar. Both works pertained to the possible military tensions between Sweden and Norway, who were in a personal union at the time, the first work causing a greater interest in the northern part of the border. The question on the presence fortresses on the Norwegian-Swedish border would become a hot topic at the dissolution of the union in 1905, specifically in the Convention of Karlstad. In 1906 Castberg published Production: en Studie, a monography in economy. Already the next year it was published in English as Production: A Study in Economics.

Peter Harboe Castberg died in 1926 in London.
