= List of mayors of Sandefjord =

List of mayors of Sandefjord Municipality in Vestfold county, Norway:

Term	Mayor	Occupation	Party
1846	Anton Otto Steen	Tanner	
1847	Joh. Fr. A. Thaulow	Customs treasurer	
1848	Jørgen Ebbesen	Physician	
1849	Joh. Fr. A. Thaulow	Customs treasurer	
1850	Jørgen Ebbesen	Physician	
1851	Johannes Aagaard	Grocer	
1852	Thor N. Tholvsen	Grocer	
1853	J.A. Johnsen	Grocer	
1854	Jørgen Ebbesen	Physician	
1855–1856	Thor Bryn	Lawyer	
1857	Johan Ludvig C. Stephani	Customs officer	
1858	Joh. Fr. A. Thaulow	Customs treasurer	
1859–1862	Johan Ludvig C. Stephani	Customs officer	
1863	Thor Bryn	Lawyer	
1864	Jørgen Ebbesen	Physician	
1865	Thor Bryn	Lawyer	
1866	Jørgen Ebbesen	Physician	
1867	Thor Bryn	Lawyer	
1868	Jørgen Ebbesen	Physician	
1869	Christian Lange	Pastor	
1870	Jørgen Ebbesen	Physician	
1871	Thor Bryn	Lawyer	
1872–1873	Jørgen Ebbesen	Physician	
1874	O. Oftedal	Baker	
1875–1876	Jørgen Ebbesen	Physician	
1877	Jean B. Linaae	Ship broker	
1878–1879	Peter Anton Grøn	Grocer	
1880	Jean B. Linaae	Ship broker	
1881–1883	Ole Andersen	Harbor master	Liberal Party
1884	Anders Henrik Nilsen	School principal	Liberal Party
1885–1886	Holm Hansen	Watchmaker	Liberal Party
1887	Peter Anton Grøn	Grocer	Liberal Party
1888	Hans Severin Iversen	Bookseller	Conservative Party
1889–1891	Thomas Miøen	Supreme Court Attorney	Conservative Party
1892	Thorleif Windingstad	Teacher	
1893	Thomas Miøen	Supreme Court Attorney	Conservative Party
1894–1896	Julius Christensen	Physician	Conservative Party
1897	Thomas Miøen	Supreme Court Attorney	Conservative Party
1898	Julius Christensen	Physician	Conservative Party
1899	Peder Bogen	Supreme Court Attorney	Conservative Party
1900–1901	O.A. Hoffstad	Professor	Conservative Party
1902	Anders Henrik Nilsen	School principal	Liberal Party
1903	Jean B. Linaae	Shipbroker	Conservative Party
1904	Georg Larsen	Physician	Liberal Party
1905–1907	Anders B. Hasle	Factory owner	Liberal Party
1908–1910	Julius Christensen	Physician	Conservative Party
1911–1934	O.A. Hoffstad	Professor	Conservative Party
1935–1940	Per Gulliksen	Bank manager	Conservative Party
1941	Nils Tholfsen	Farmer	Conservative Party
1941–1945	Frithjof Holtedahl (appointed by German occupation forces)	Councilor	Nasjonal Samling
1945	Per Gulliksen	Bank manager	Conservative Party
1946–1959	Frithjof Bøe	Grocer	Conservative Party
1960–1967	Kjeld Hansen-Just	Supreme Court Attorney	Conservative Party
1968–1971	Einar Abrahamsen	Supreme Court Attorney	Conservative Party
1972–1975	Sven Bilov-Olsen	Chief financial officer	Conservative Party
1976–1987	Per Odberg	Supreme Court Attorney	Conservative Party
1988–1993	Per Foshaug	School superintendent	Conservative Party
1993–1994	Egil Christensen	School superintendent	Labor Party
1994–1995	Per Ramberg	Professor	Christian Democratic Party
1995–2003	Per Foshaug	School superintendent	Conservative Party
2003–	Bjørn Ole Gleditsch	Factory owner	Conservative Party

== Sources ==
- Berg, Knut (1984). Sandefjords historie – sett gjennem Sandefjords Blads spalter 1861-1983. Pages 773–776.
- Hoffstad, Arne (1976). Sandefjord – byen vår: Trekk fra Sandefjordsdistriktets historie under hvalfangsteventyret 1905-1968. Forf. ISBN 8299038413.
- Hougen, Knut (1932). Sandefjords historie 2. Cammermeyers Boghandel. Accessible through the National Library of Norway at https://urn.nb.no/URN:NBN:no-nb_digibok_2012060806092
