= Kaupanger Stave Church =

Church in Vestland, Norway

- Kaupanger stavkyrkje
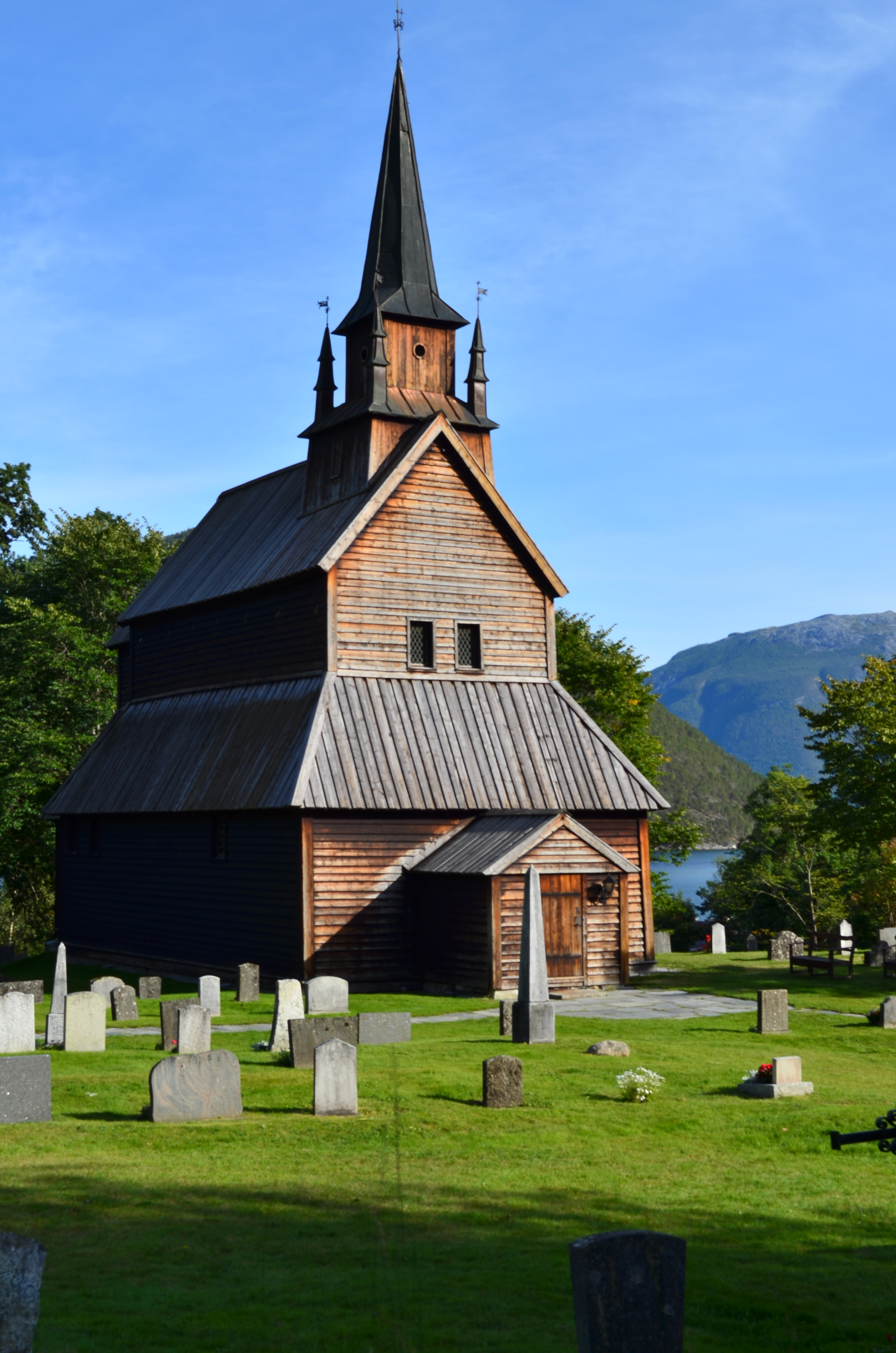
- View of the church
- Kaupanger Stave Church
- 61°11′03″N 7°14′00″E
- Location: Sogndal Municipality, Vestland
- Country: Norway
- Denomination: Church of Norway
- Previous denomination: Catholic Church
- Churchmanship: Evangelical Lutheran

History
- Status: Parish church
- Founded: 11th century
- Consecrated: c. 1140

Architecture
- Functional status: Active
- Architectural type: Long church
- Completed: c. 1140 (886 years ago)

Specifications
- Capacity: 125
- Materials: Wood

Administration
- Diocese: Bjørgvin bispedømme
- Deanery: Sogn prosti
- Parish: Kaupanger
- Norwegian Cultural Heritage Site
- Type: Church
- Status: Automatically protected
- ID: 84766

Kaupanger Stave Church (Norwegian: Kaupanger stavkyrkje) is the largest stave church in Vestland county, Norway. It is a parish church of the Church of Norway in Sogndal Municipality and it is located in the village of Kaupanger, on the northern shore of the Sognefjorden. It is the church for the Kaupanger parish which is part of the Sogn prosti (deanery) in the Diocese of Bjørgvin. The brown, wooden church was built in the mid-12th century (around 1140) and it has been in use ever since that time. The church seats about 125 people.

The church is a Norwegian Cultural Heritage Site and it is owned by the Society for the Preservation of Ancient Norwegian Monuments. The nave is supported by 22 staves (large bearing columns), eight on each of the longer sides and three on each of the shorter. The elevated chancel is carried by four free standing staves. The church has the largest number of staves to be found in any one stave church. It is the largest of the five stave churches in Sogn og Fjordane county.

== History ==
The earliest existing historical records of the church date back to the year 1308, but the church was not built that year. The first church in Kaupanger was a wooden stave church that was probably built during the mid-11th century. Not much is known about that church other than it was a rectangular building. In the early 12th century, a new wooden stave church was built on the same site. That church burned down at some point (probably in the 1130s) and then the present church was constructed on the same site after that. Historically, the church was thought to have been built in the late 12th century after the Battle of Fimreite, however recent research has changed this date. The church was likely built in the mid-12th century, around the year 1140. Kaupanger was a market town that King Sverre burned down in 1184 to punish the local inhabitants for disobeying him. It was previously thought that the second stave church (built in the early 12th century) burned down in this fire. Archaeological research in the 1960s revealed that the second church had burned down, so it was assumed it was in the fire of 1184. The present church was therefore believed to have been built after that, probably around 1190. Recent research, however, has changed these assumptions. Dendrochronology has shown that the timber used for building the present church was cut in 1137. Also, Sverris saga makes no mention of the burning of this church at the time the town was burned. Consequently, it is now assumed that the church was built around 1140–1150 and that the second church burned down before that in a different fire.

During the 13th century, the church was enlarged to the west by adding about 3.5 metres (11 ft) to the nave. After that addition, the nave measured about 13 by 7.5 metres (43 ft × 25 ft). In 1625, the choir was renovated and enlarged. Also, around that time, the covered corridor that encircled the church was removed and some small windows were added to the nave. Over the centuries, there have been several restoration projects have taken place both inside the church and on the exterior. A major reconstruction was carried out in 1862, which has been called a "brutal modernization". New rows of windows were cut into the sides of the church, white exterior panelling was installed and dark roof tiles covered the old shingle roof. In 1959–1960, a restoration was carried out and many of the 1862 changes were undone and it was brought back to its 17th century look. The pulpit, altarpiece, and baptismal font that are in the church date back to the 1620s or 1630s.

== Media gallery ==
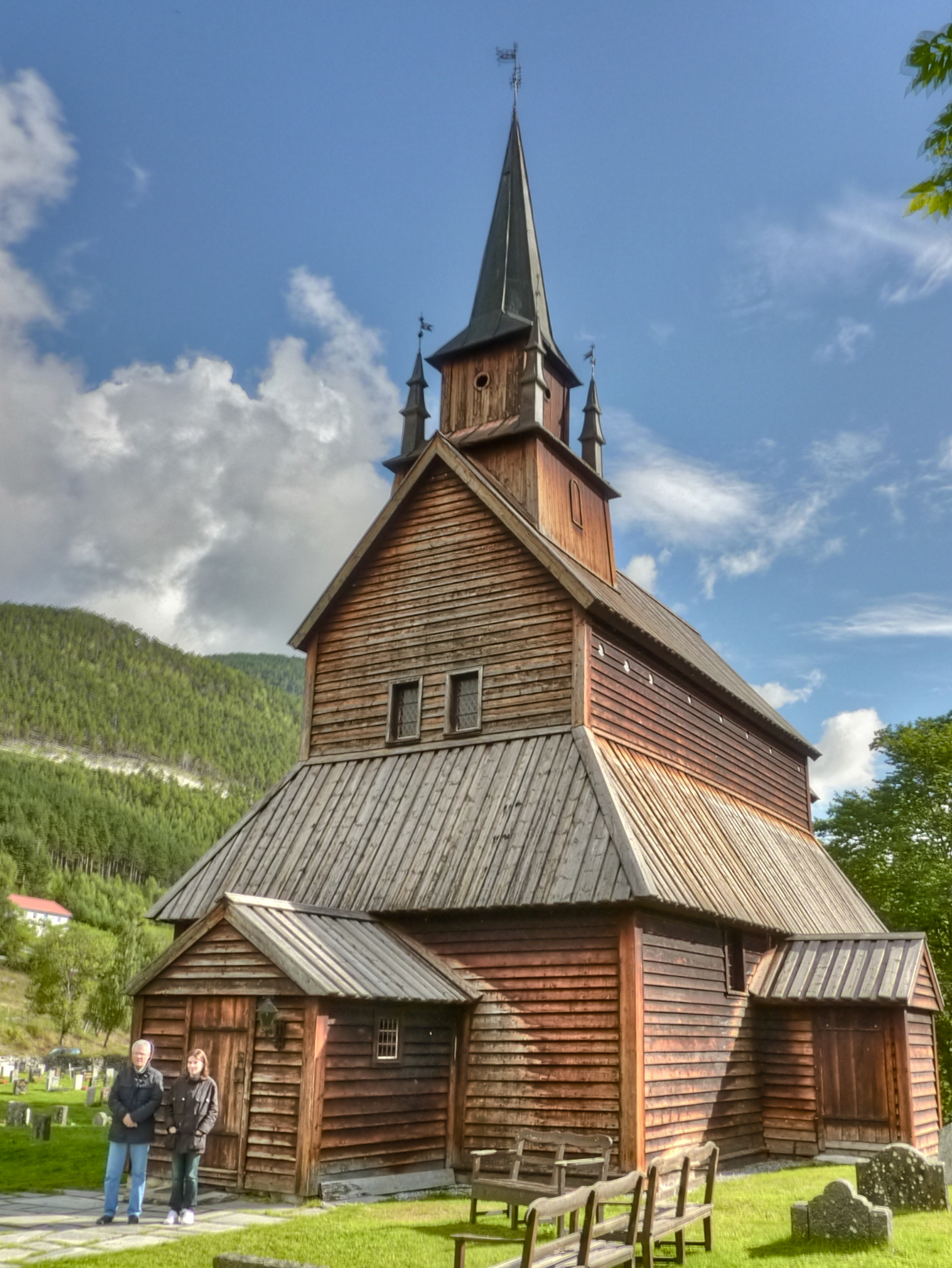
Exterior front view

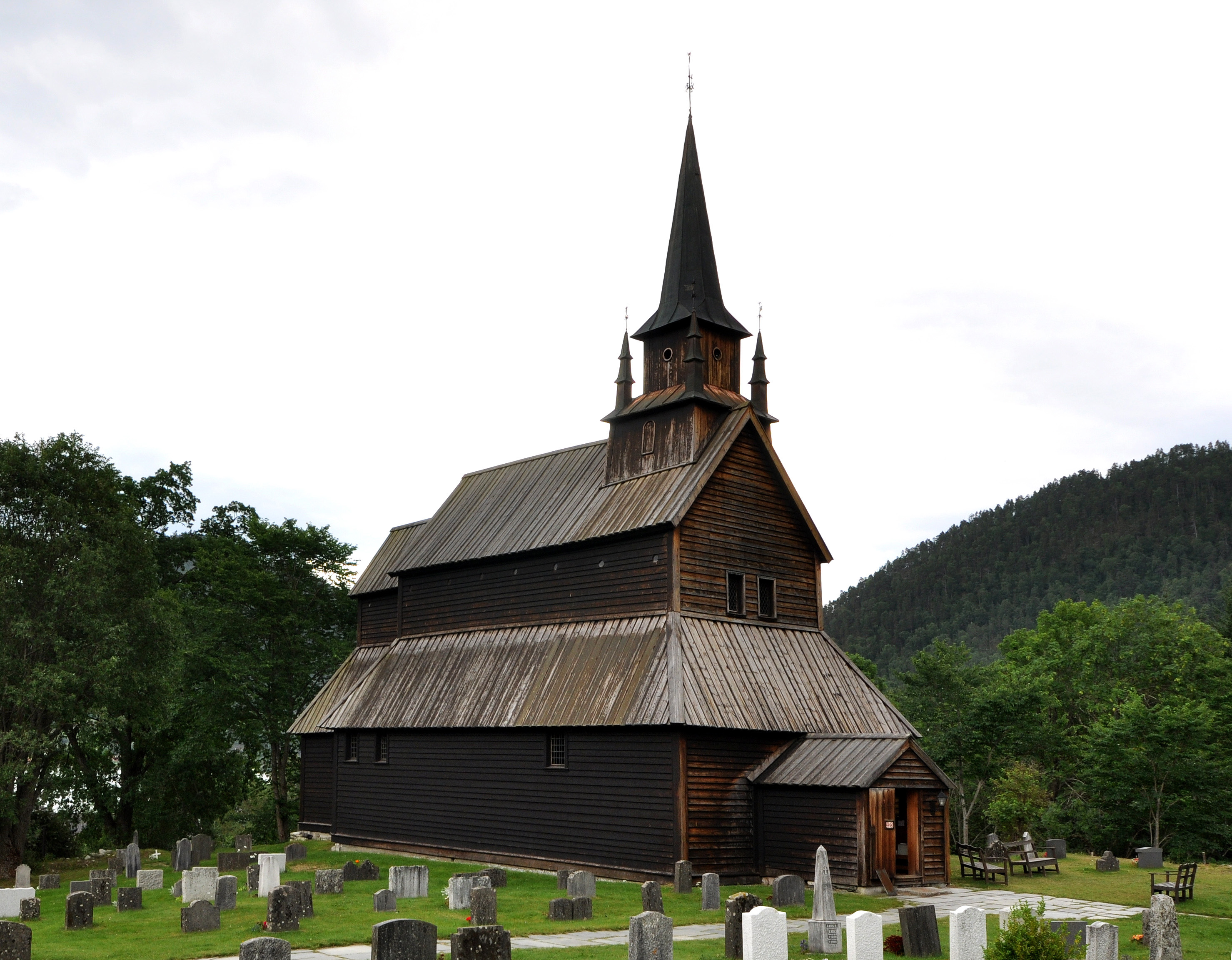
Exterior side view

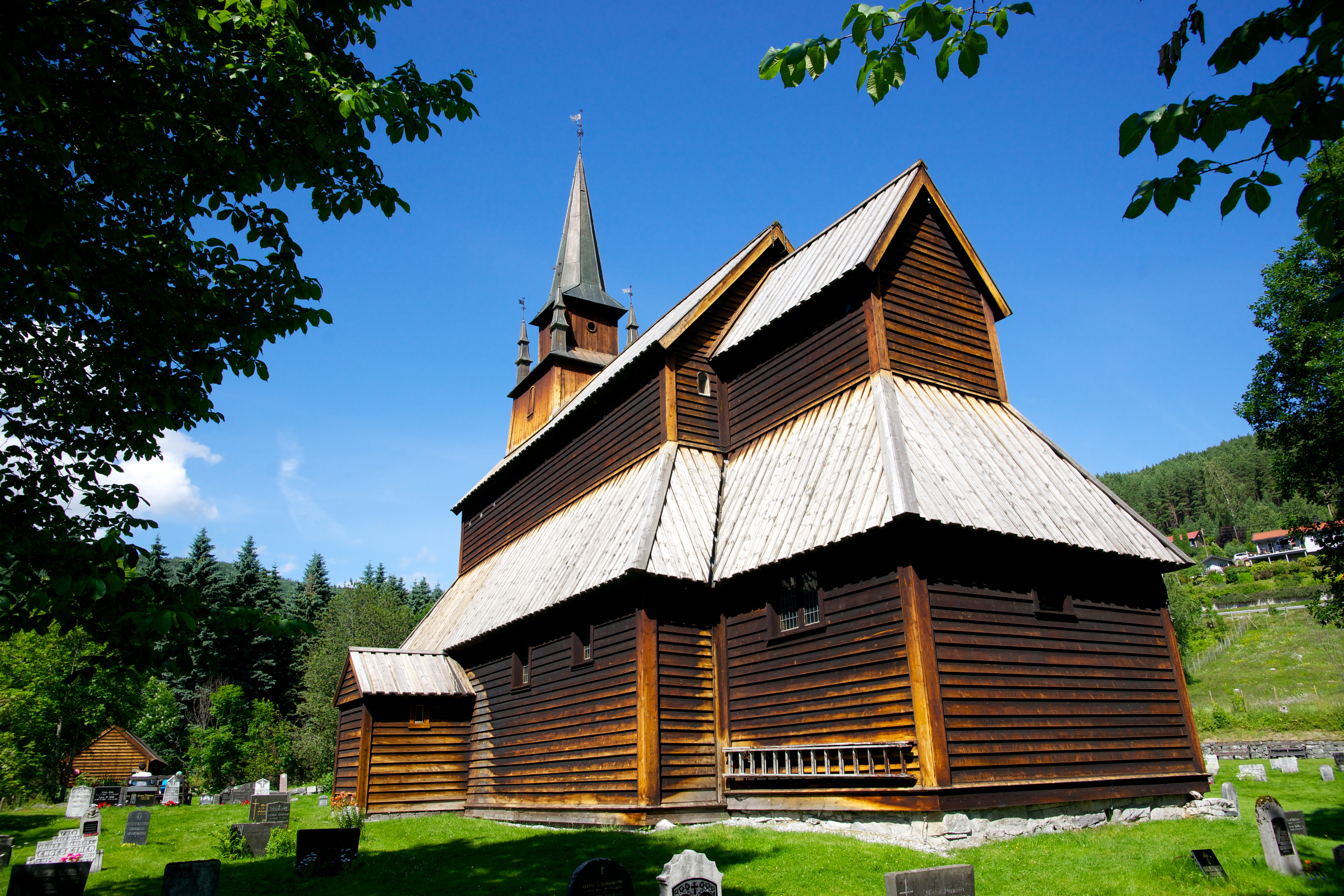
Exterior rear view

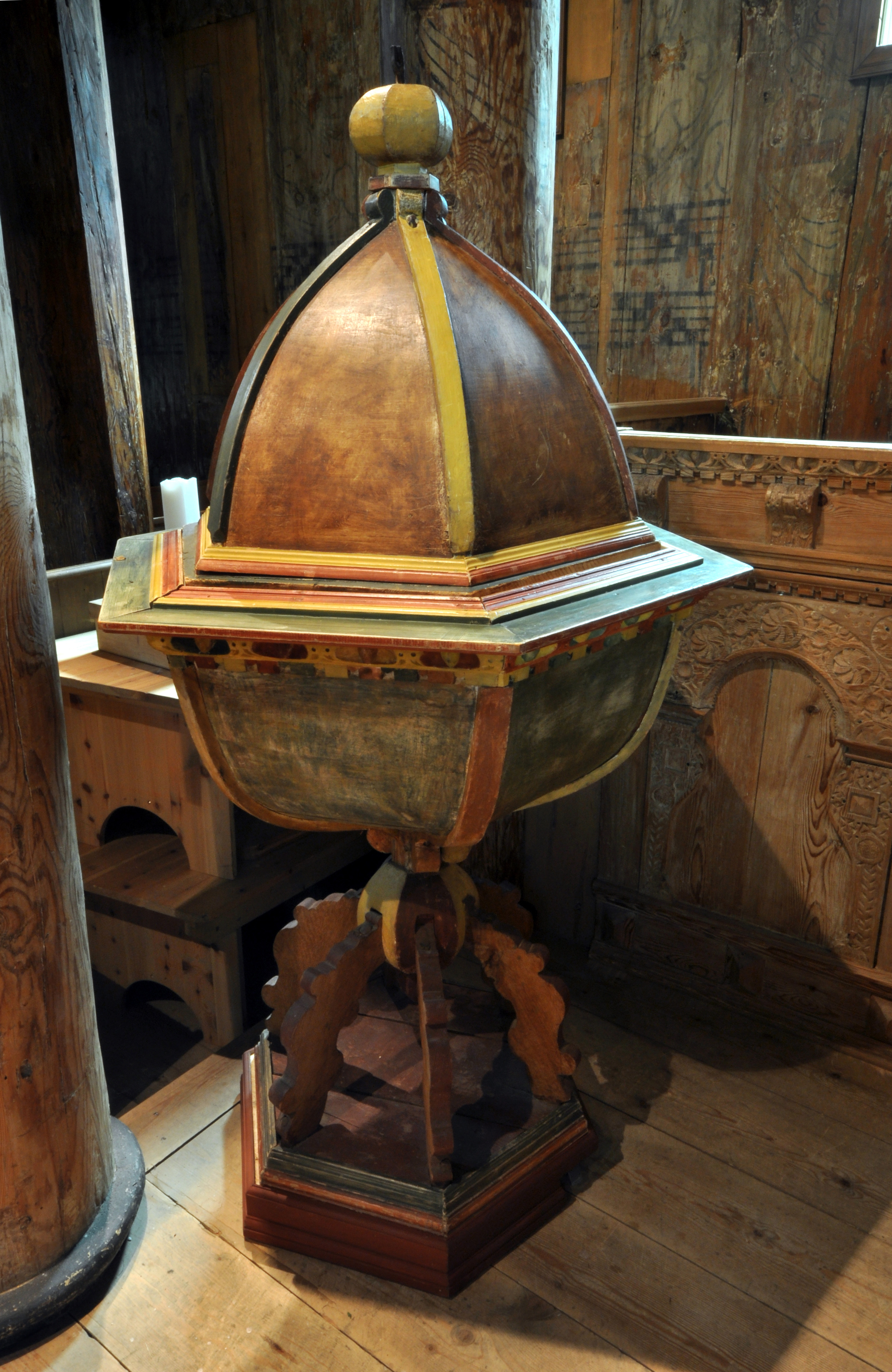
Baptistery

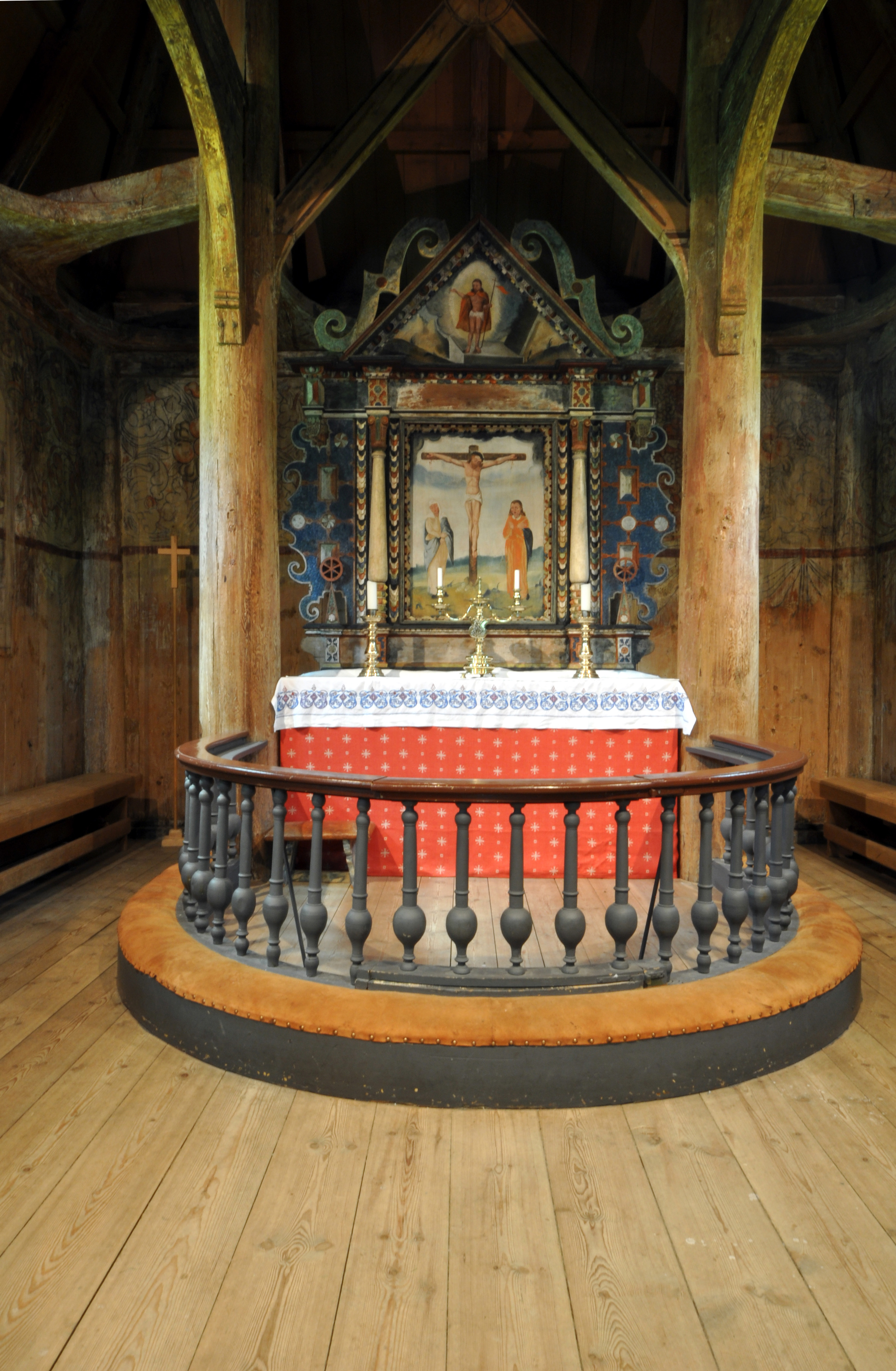
Chancel

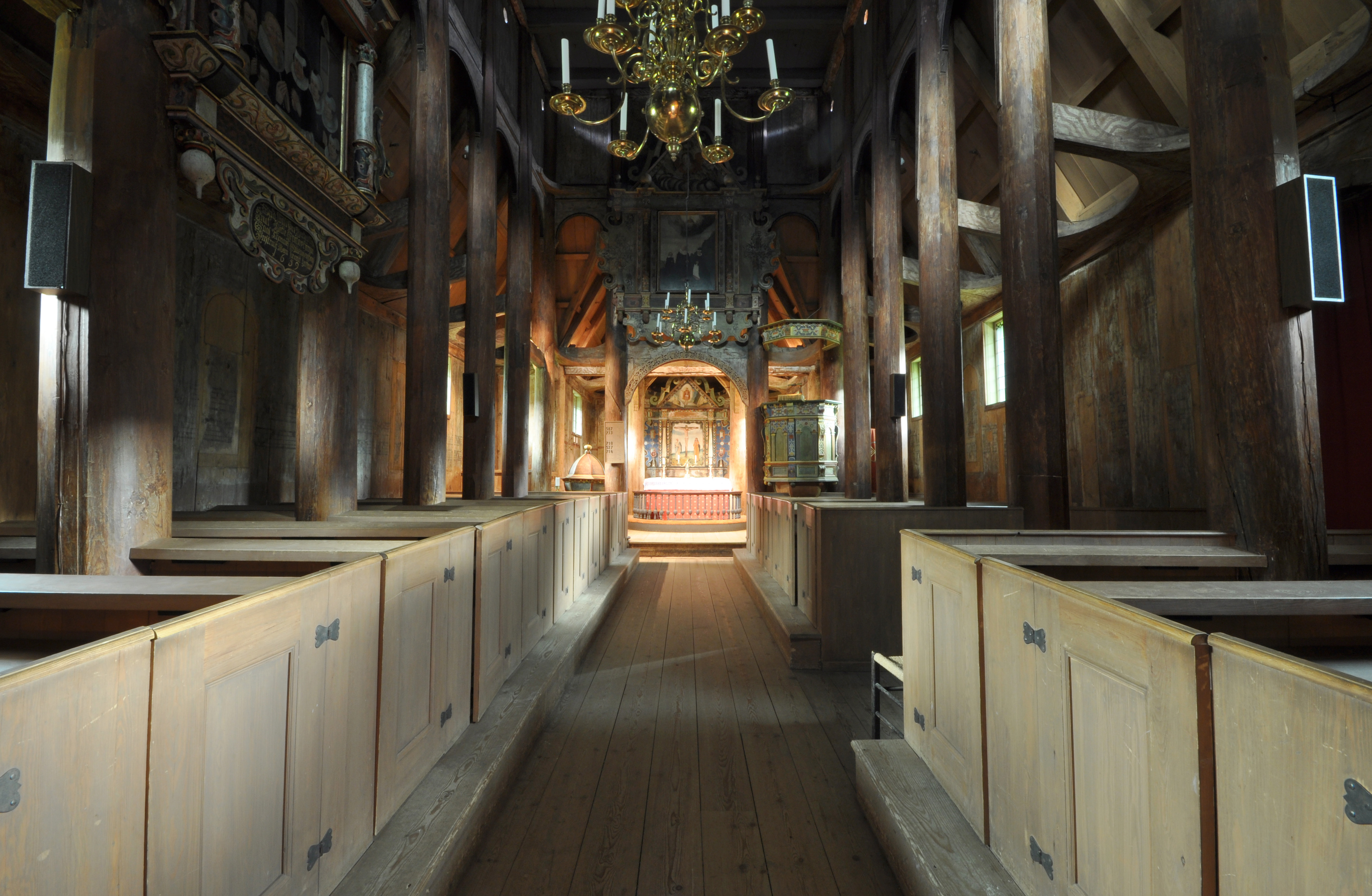
Interior view

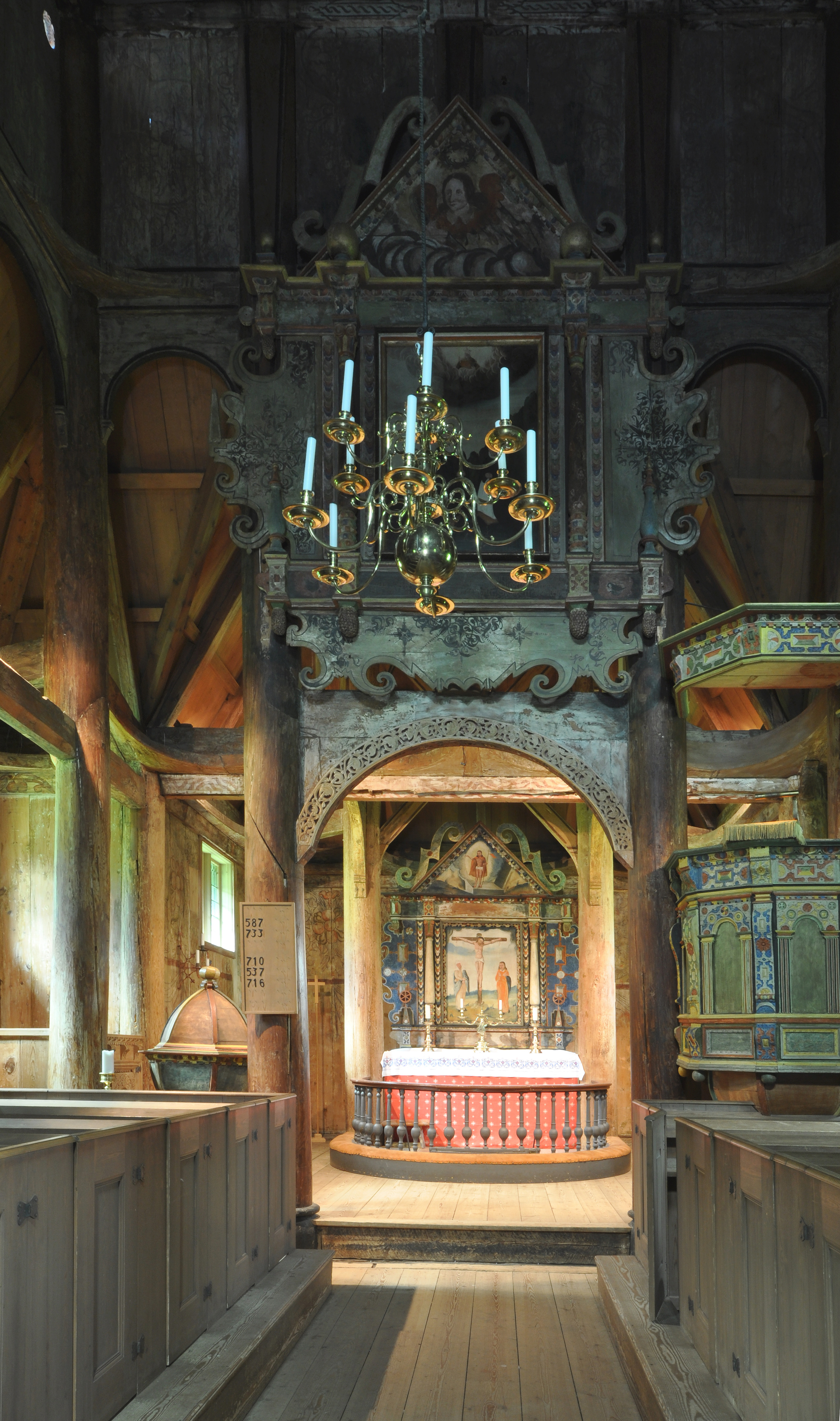
Nave

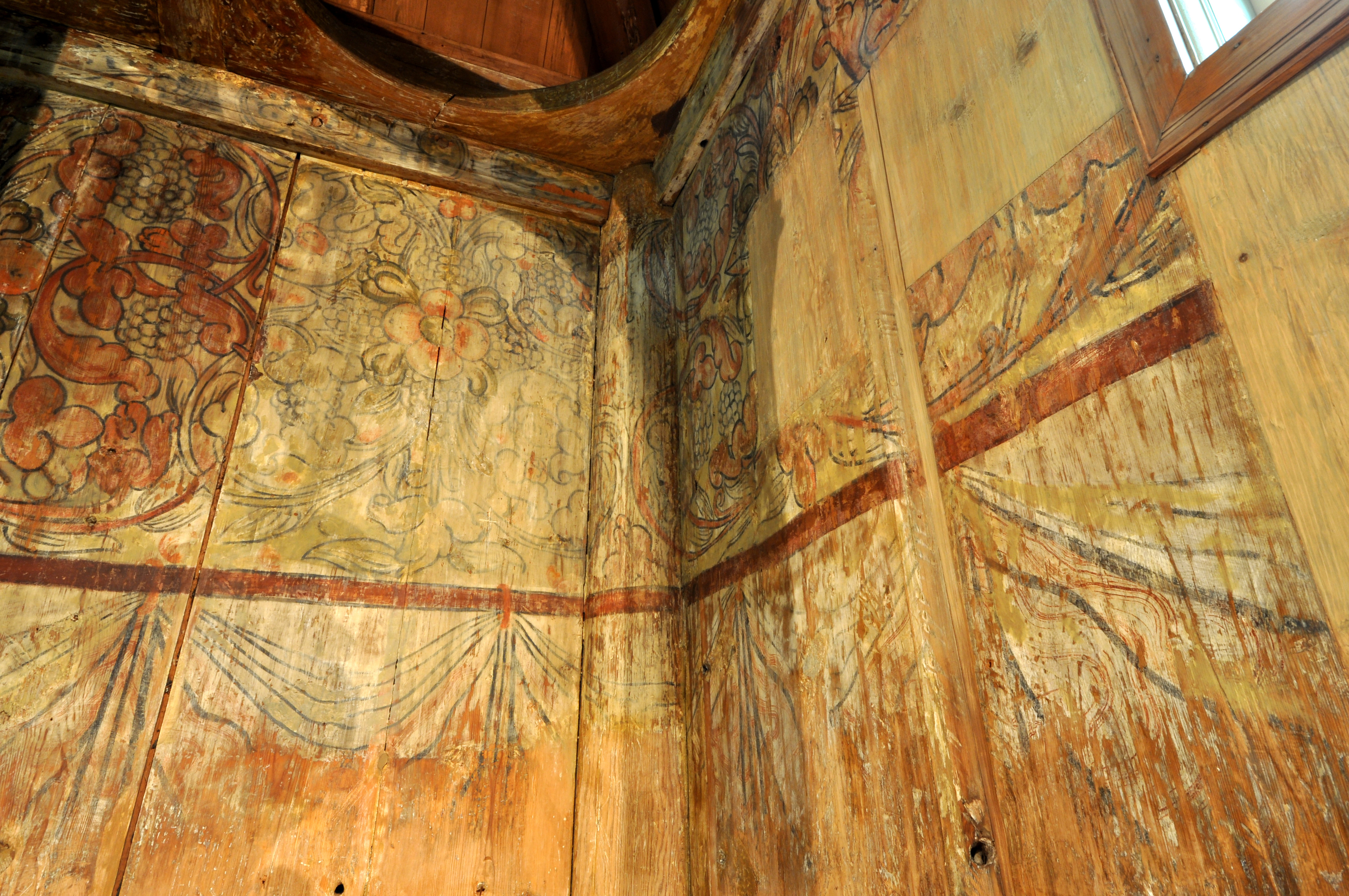
Old wall painting

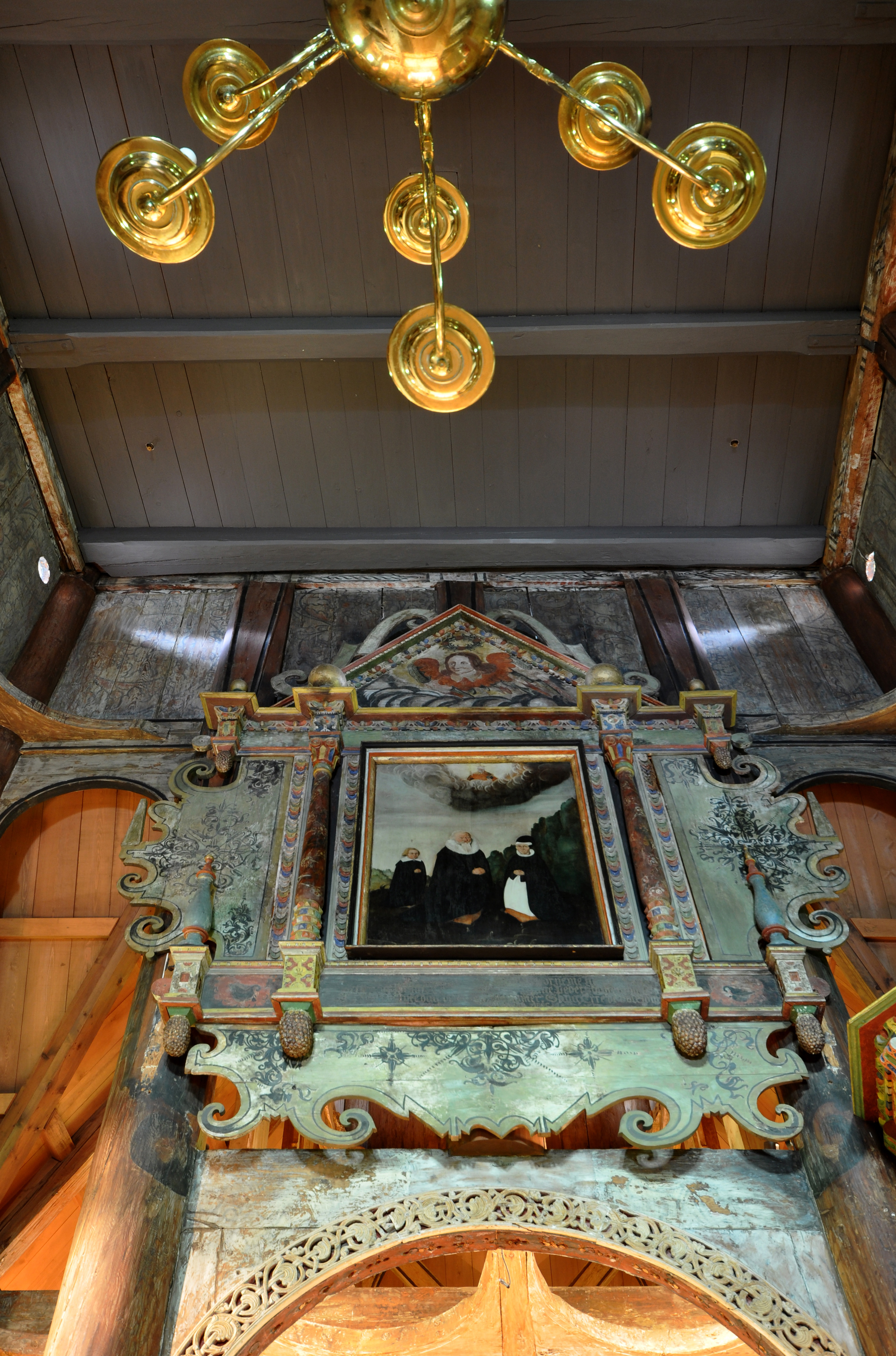
Picture above chancel

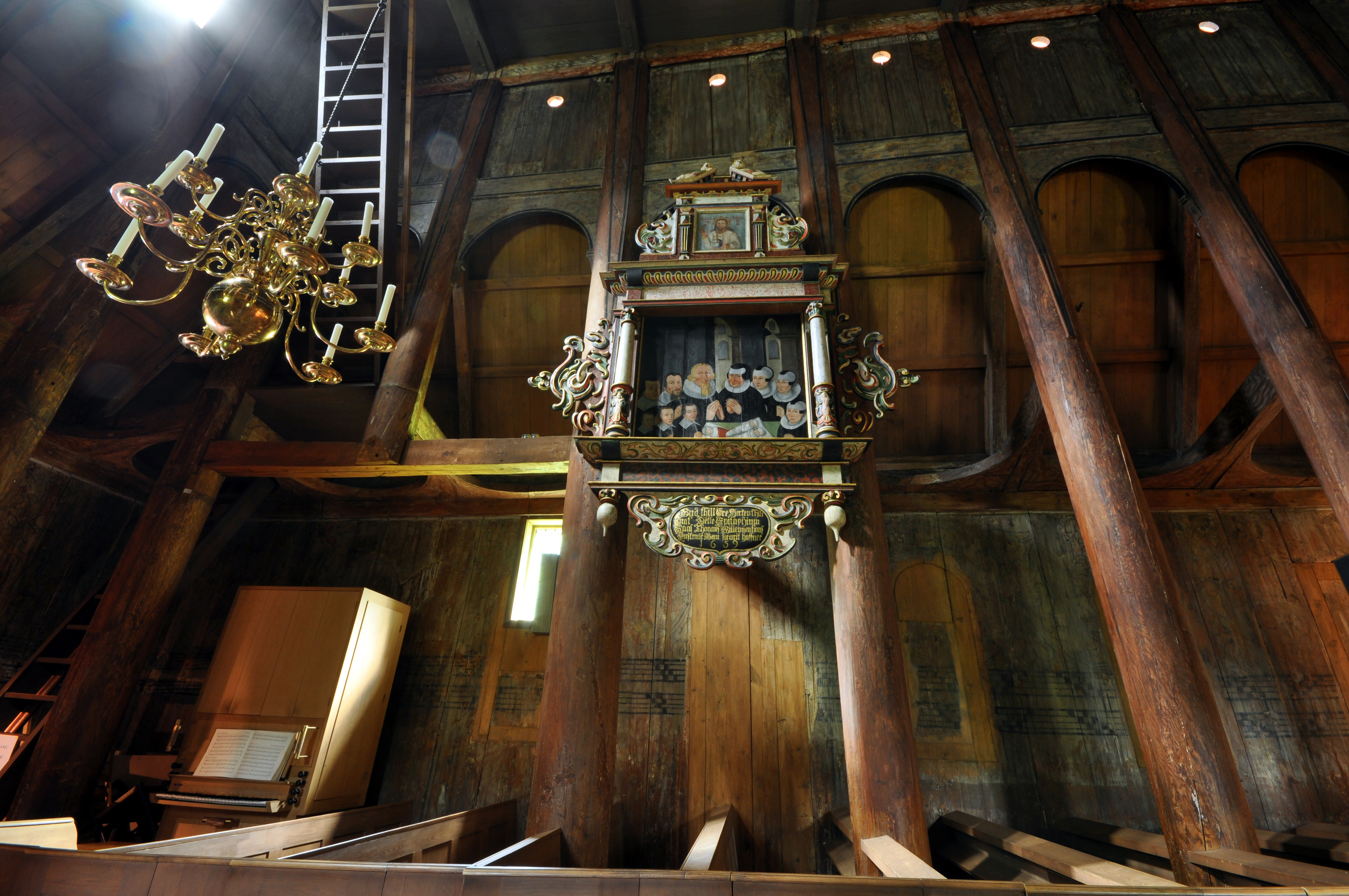
View of the staves (columns) inside the church

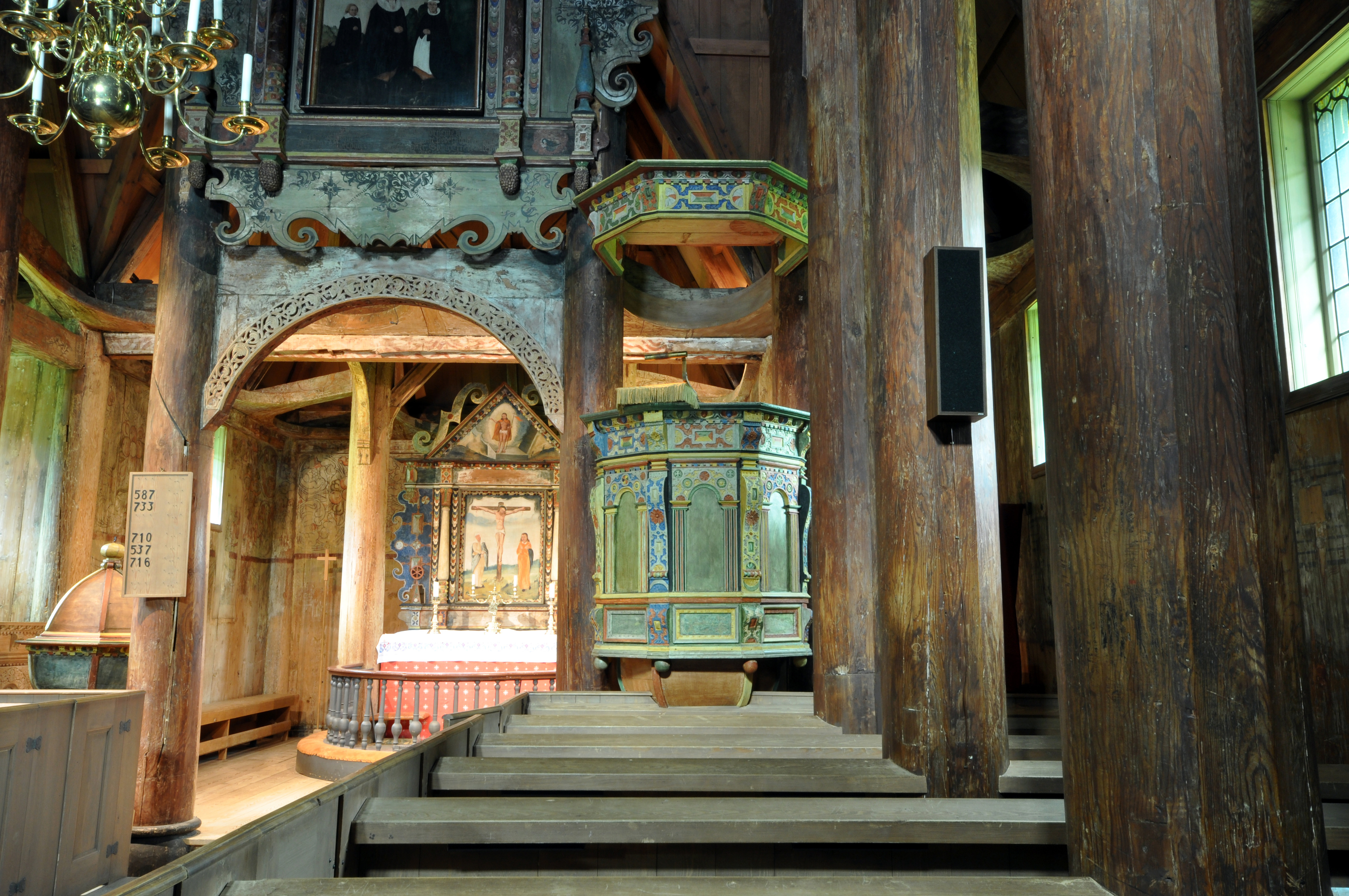
Pulpit

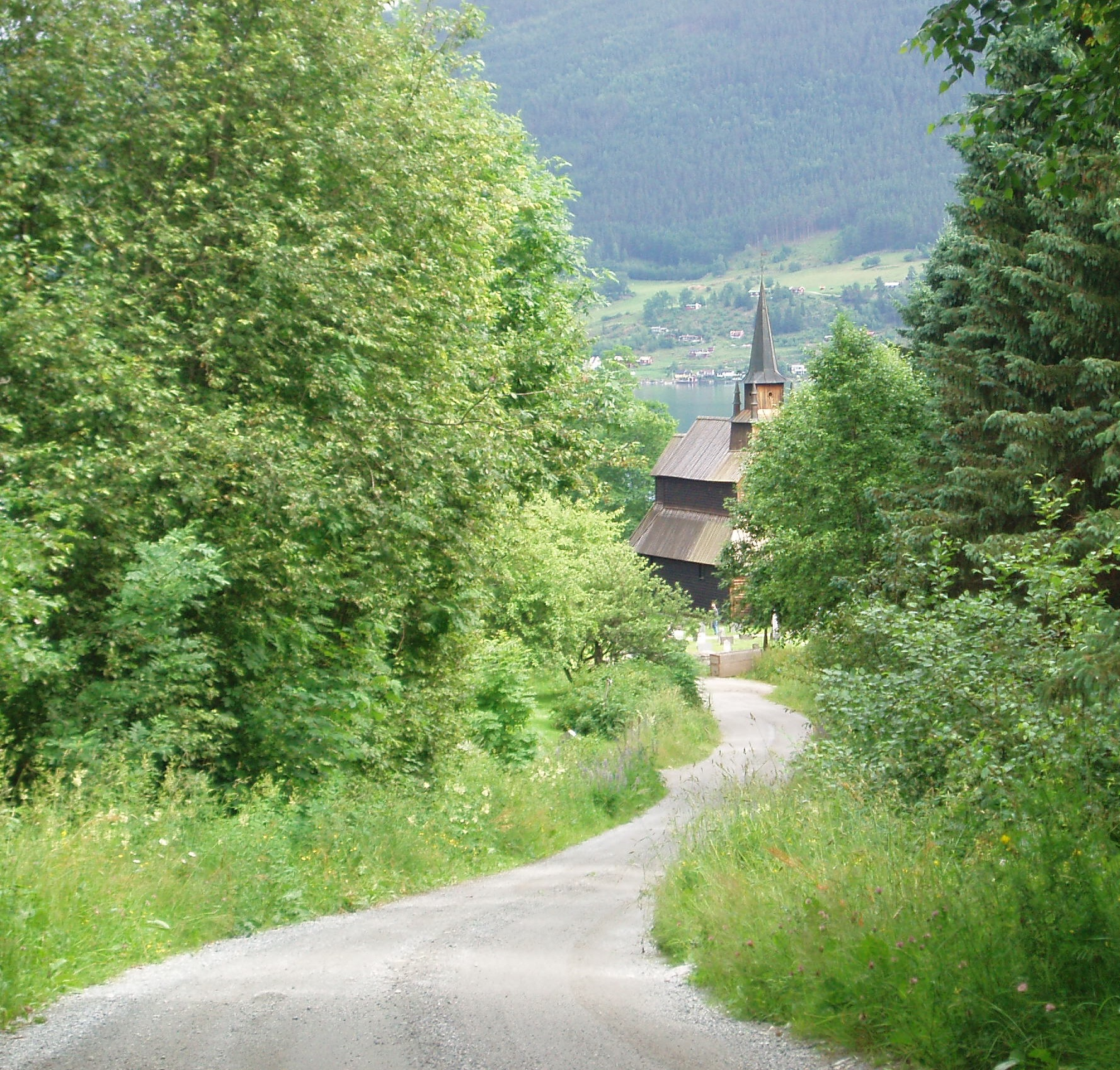
View from a distance

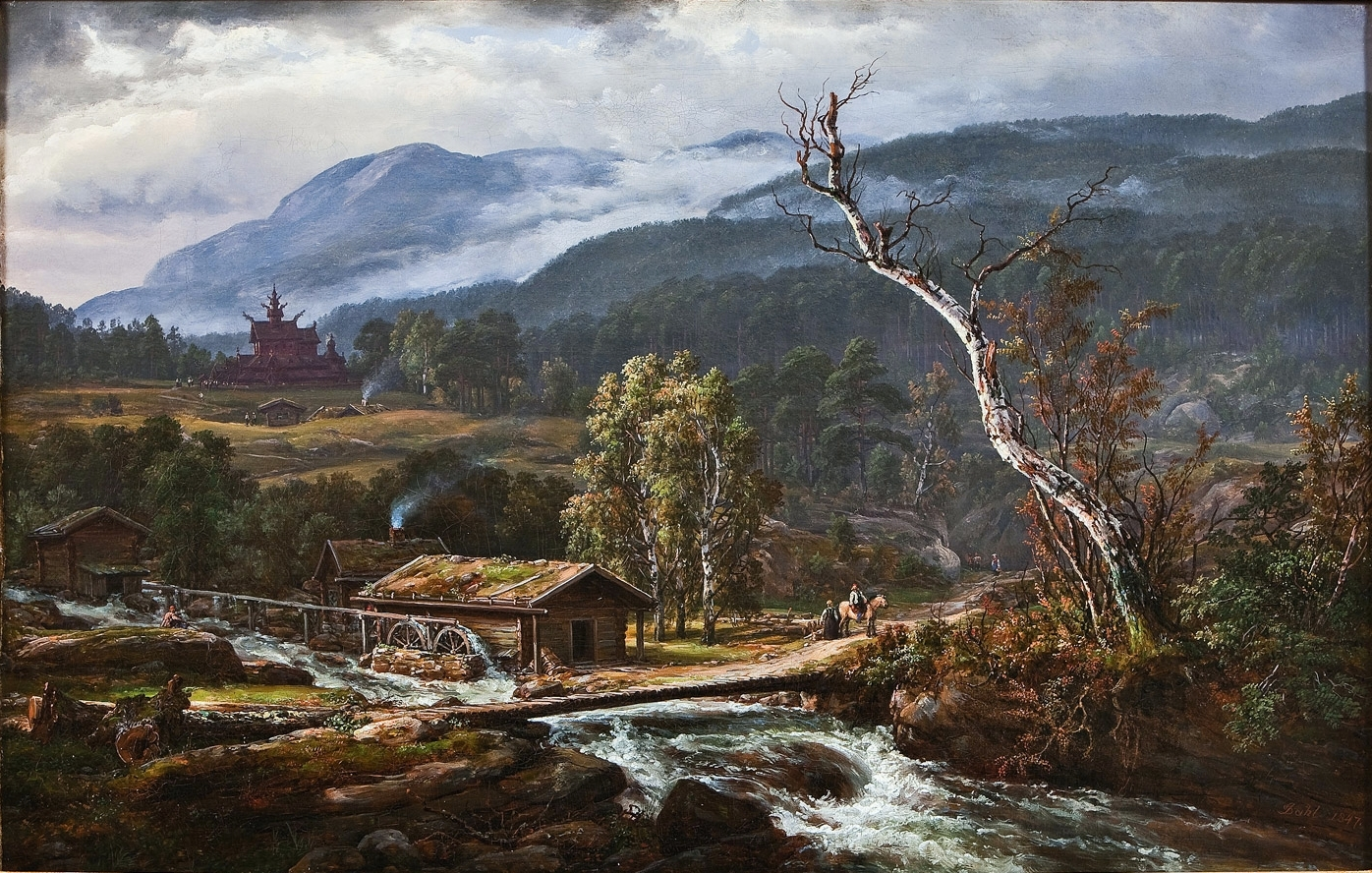
«Landskap ved Kaupanger med stavkirke» (Landscape at Kaupanger with stave church) by Johan Christian Dahl, 1847

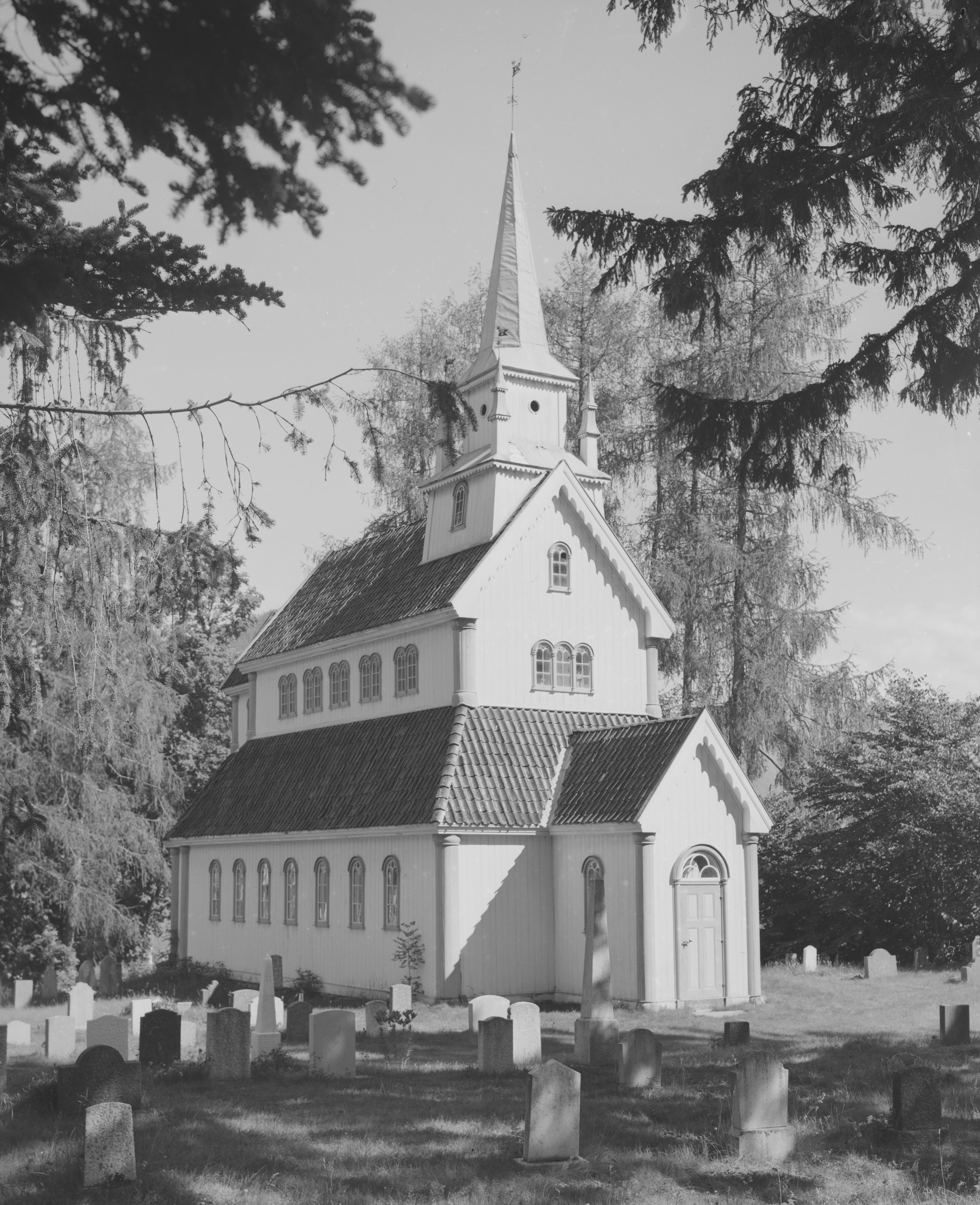
Church exterior between 1862 and 1965

== See also ==
- List of churches in Bjørgvin
