= Christiania Bank =

Norwegian bank (1848–2000)

Christiania Bank og Kreditkasse ASA
- Type: Public
- Industry: Banking
- Founded: 1848
- Fate: Integrated into Nordea
- Successor: Nordea
- Headquarters: Oslo, Norway
- Area served: Norway
- Products: Financial services
- Parent: Nordea
- Website: www.kreditkasse.no
- Footnotes; Still operating as part of the Nordea Group.

Christiania Bank og Kreditkasse, branded domestically as Kreditkassen or K-Bank and internationally as Christiania Bank, is a Norwegian bank founded in 1848. Following its acquisition in 2000 by MeritaNordbanken, it became part of the Nordea group. The institution continues its operations as a specialized private banking and investment banking arm within the Nordea structure.

Headquartered in Oslo, it was Norway's second largest bank at the time of its acquisition.

Christiania Bank had branch offices in London, New York, and Singapore.

== History ==
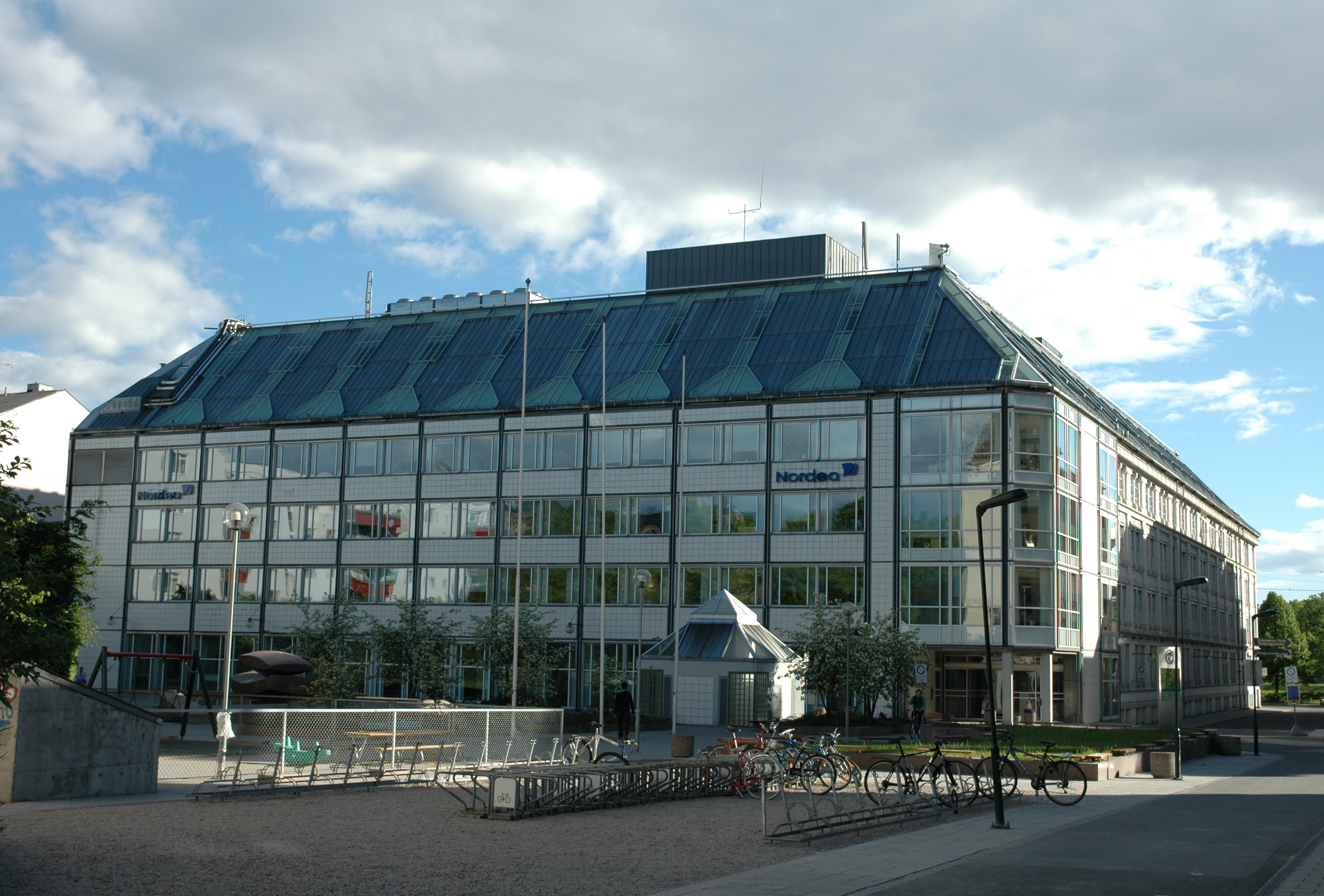
Kreditkassen's headquarters in Oslo

The bank was founded in Oslo (then called Christiania) in 1848 as Christiania Kreditkasse, though changed its name to Christiania Bank og Kreditkasse in 1862. In 1858, the bank moved out of its temporary location at the home of the bank manager, Fritz Henrich Frölich, and to permanent locations. It opened branches in 1897, under the directorship of Peter Harboe Castberg.

The bank expanded out of Oslo in 1957 when it bought Elverum Kreditbank and Hamar Privatbank, and in 1959 with the acquisition of Agder Bank. By 1965, the bank had 18 offices outside Oslo. In 1973, the bank opened its first international office, in Luxembourg. In the 1980s, the bank further acquired Andresens Bank (in 1980), Vestfoldbanken (in 1981) and Fiskernes Bank (in 1983).

In the last years of the 1980s, there was a major financial crisis in Norway and by 1991 the bank had used up all capital. To save the bank, the Government of Norway took over the bank and gave it new capital, rescuing it from bankruptcy. In the early years of the 1990s, the bank also bought Sunnmørsbanken and Sørlandsbanken. In 1995, the government reduced its ownership to 51%, listing it on the Oslo Stock Exchange, and in 1999 to 35%. The same year, the Swedish MeritaNordbanken bid for the bank, and in 2000 the government sold its shares and the bank became part of Nordea.
