= Kristian Friis Petersen =

Norwegian politician (1867–1932)

Kristian Friis Pettersen
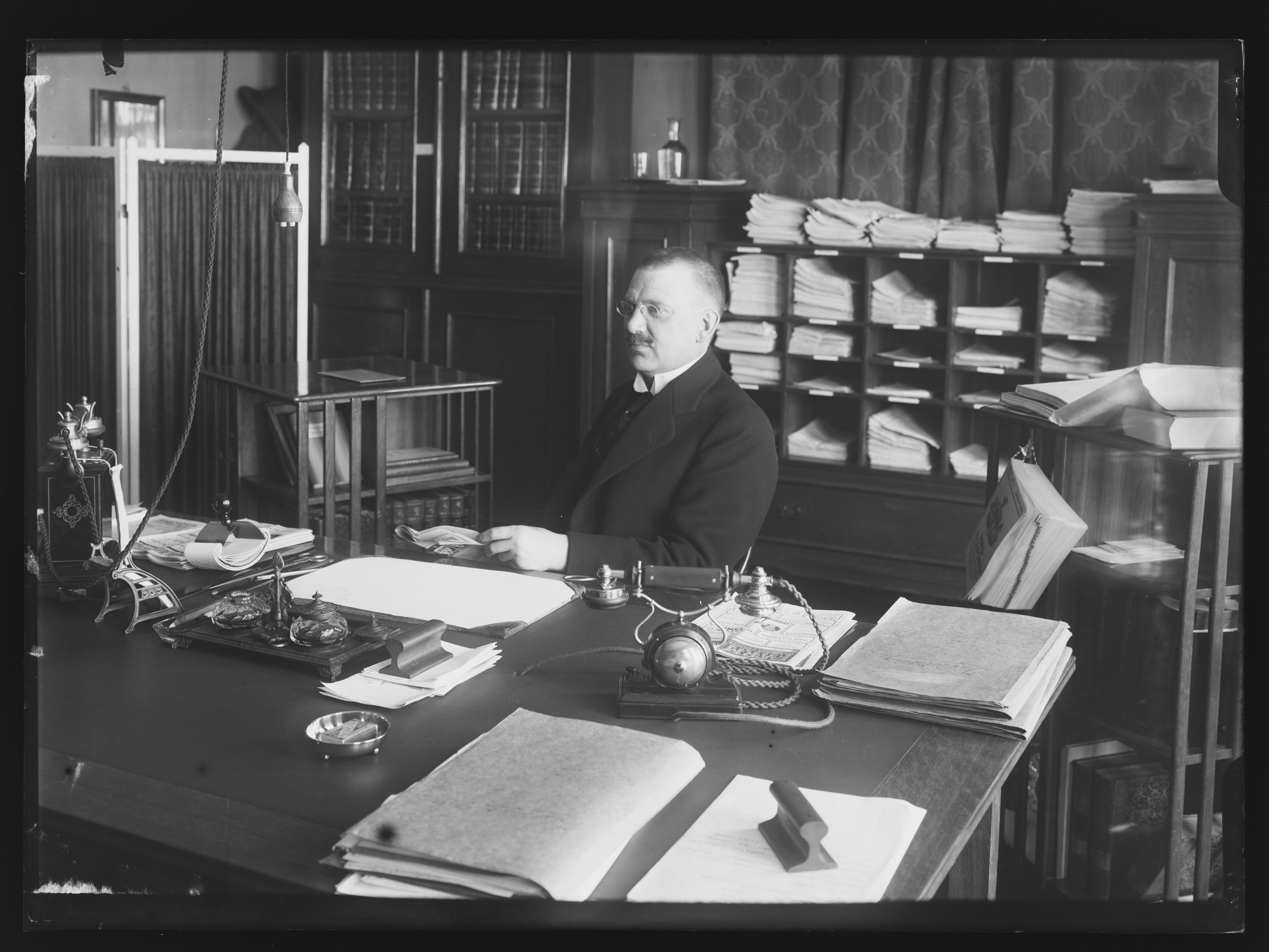

Minister of Social Affairs
- In office 22 April 1914 – 1 October 1916
- Prime Minister: Gunnar Knudsen
- Preceded by: Johan Castberg
- Succeeded by: Lars Abrahamsen

Minister of Trade and Industry
- In office 1 October 1916 – 20 February 1919
- Prime Minister: Gunnar Knudsen
- Preceded by: Johan Castberg
- Succeeded by: Birger Stuevold-Hansen

Personal details
- Born: 7 September 1867 Namsos, Nord-Trøndelag, United Kingdoms of Sweden and Norway
- Died: 5 April 1932 (aged 64) Oslo, Norway
- Party: Liberal
- Spouse: Hanna Elisabeth Møller
- Children: 4
- Parent(s): Carl Gottlieb Petersen; Charlotte Louise Friis

Kristian Friis Petersen (17 September 1867 – 5 April 1932) was the Norwegian Minister of Social Affairs 1914–1916 and Minister of Trade 1916–1919.

Kristian became a student from Ålesund Latin School in 1886. In 1891 he attended a Candidate of Law degree and then attended the Sorenskriver in Søre Sunnmøre until he began a business in Ålesund in 1893. When his father was appointed foe in Romsdal that same year, he was one of the years appointed police chief in Ålesund.

From 1918 to 1929 he was County Governor of Hordaland.

Government offices
Preceded by Hroar Olsen	County Governor of Hordaland; 1918–1929	Succeeded by Ernst Andreas Johannesen
