= Niels Knagenhielm =

Norwegian civil servant, land owner and merchant

Niels Tygesøn Knagenhielm (also known as Niels Knag; 11 May 1661 – 19 May 1737) was a Norwegian civil servant, land owner and merchant. He is also known for his writings about Northern Norway.

Knagenhielm was born near Vågsneset in the parish of Aure in Nordmøre, Norway. He served as district stipendiary magistrate and bailiff in Finnmark. Along with Bergen merchant Jørgen Thormøhlen, he became involved with the lucrative trade in Finnmark and northern Russia. In 1688 he was appointed deputy judge of Stavanger, and in 1695, he was appointed to Lagmann in Bergen. He lived at the Hop farm on the island of Askøy. In 1710 he also bought the farms at Kaupanger and Stedje parish in Sogndal and Losnegard on the island of Losna. He was knighted in 1721 with the surname Knagenhielm. He died in 1737 and was buried at St Mary's Church in Bergen.
