= Torgrim Castberg =

Norwegian violinist

Torgrim Castberg (8 September 1874 – 17 June 1928) was a Norwegian violinist.

== Personal life ==
Torgrim Castberg was born in Skien as the son of customs surveyor and politician Johan Christian Tandberg Castberg (1827–1899) and his wife Hanna Magdalene Frisak Ebbesen (1839–1881). He had several brothers and sisters, including the notable politician Johan.

His paternal grandfather Peter Hersleb Harboe Castberg was a priest and politician. In addition, Torgrim was a first cousin of sculptor Oscar Ambrosius Castberg. On the maternal side, he was a grandson of Jørgen Tandberg Ebbesen and nephew of Just Bing Ebbesen, both of whom were involved in politics too.

Torgrim Castberg married Ida Anker in 1896. Their son Johan Christian became a noted illustrator. Through Johan Castberg, Torgrim was the uncle of professor Frede Castberg.

== Career ==
From 1900 Torgrim Castberg was a concert master in the Bergen Philharmonic Orchestra. In 1928 he established the Music Academy in Bergen.

He died in 1928 in Paris.
