= Frede Castberg =

Norwegian jurist (1893–1977)

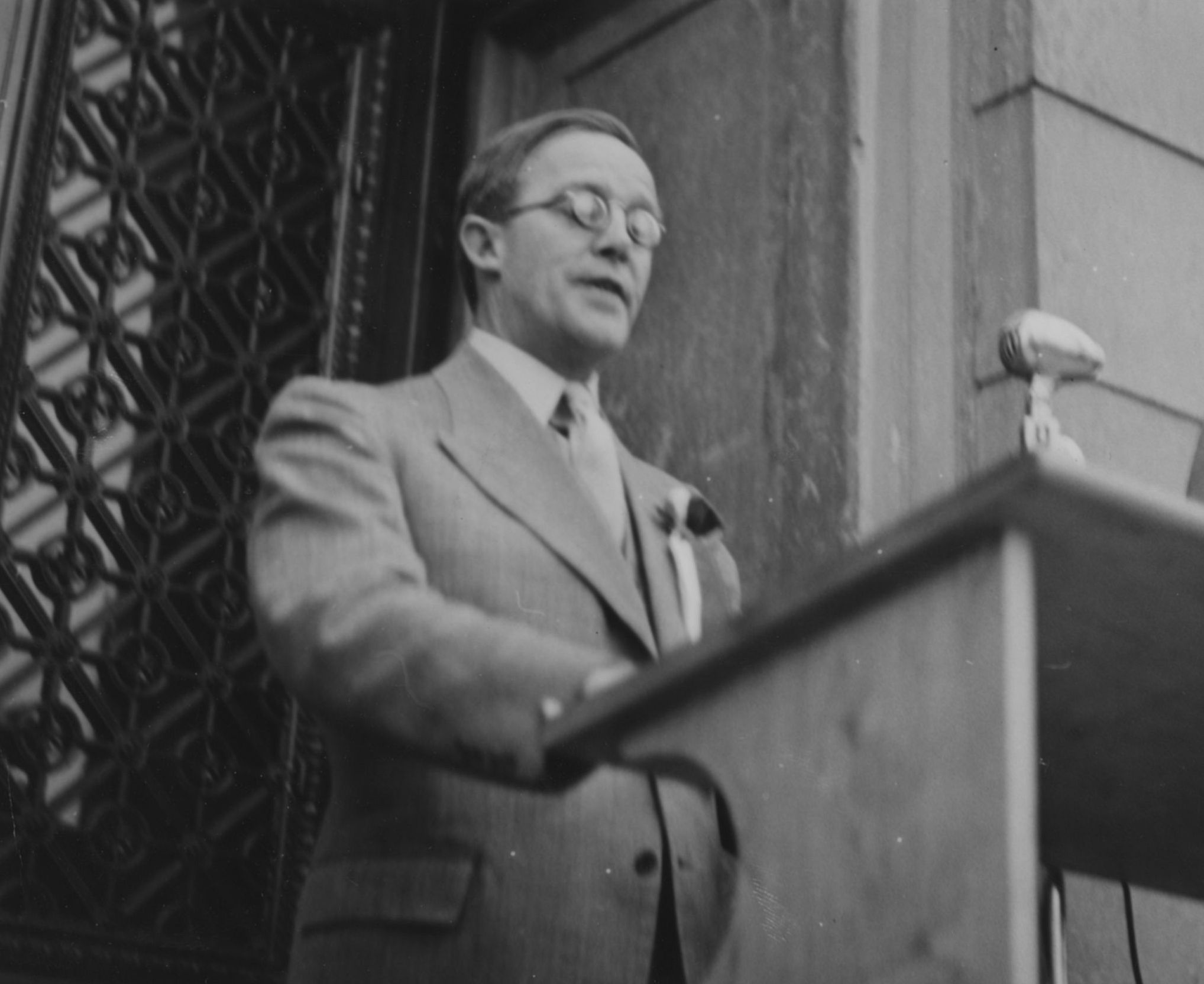
- Frede Castberg
- Born: 4 July 1893; Vardal Municipality, Norway
- Died: 4 November 1977 (aged 84); Oslo
- Citizenship: Norwegian
- Known for: President, Hague Academy of International Law
- Scientific career
- Fields: jurisprudence constitutional law administrative law public international law
- Institutions: University of Oslo research fellow 1919–1924 professor 1928–1963 rector 1952–1958

Frede Castberg (4 July 1893 – 4 November 1977) was a Norwegian jurist. The son of Johan Castberg, he served as professor and rector at the University of Oslo as well as president of The Hague Academy of International Law.

== Personal life ==
Frede Castberg was born in Vardal Municipality as the son of jurist and politician Johan Castberg (1862–1926) and his wife Karen Cathrine Anker (1867–1932). He was the paternal great-grandson of priest and politician Peter Hersleb Harboe Castberg, grandson of customs surveyor and politician Johan Christian Tandberg Castberg, nephew of violinist Torgrim Castberg and first cousin of illustrator Johan Christian Castberg. On the maternal side Frede Castberg was the nephew of Katti Anker Møller.

Castberg was married twice. The first marriage, to Synnøve Reimers (died 1990), lasted between 1921 and 1925, and produced one daughter. In February 1927, Castberg married his cousin Ella Anker (died 1974). They had two daughters, born in late 1927 and in 1933.

== Career ==
Like his father, Frede Castberg had an academic career. He enrolled as a student of law in 1911 and graduated as cand.jur. in 1914. He held various jobs as a jurist in 1915 and 1916, before being issued grants to undertake further studies abroad. He studied public law in France and England from 1916 to 1917, in Germany in 1919 and in Austria in 1921. From 1919 he was employed at the University of Oslo as a research fellow. He took the dr. juris degree in 1921, and was hired as a consultant at the Norwegian Nobel Institute in the same year. He left his post as research fellow in 1924, having been engaged as a secretary and advisor in the dispute between Norway and Denmark over Greenland. In 1925 he was hired permanently as a consultant in the Norwegian Ministry of Foreign Affairs.

In 1928 Castberg was appointed professor of jurisprudence at the University of Oslo. He specialized in constitutional law, administrative law, philosophy of law and public international law. Among his most important publications were Norges statsforfatning (two volumes, 1933), Folkerett (1937), Rettsfilosofiske grunnspørsmål (1939), Norge under okkupasjonen; rettslige utredninger 1940–1943 (1945) and Freedom of Speech in the West (1960). Castberg also became known to the general public, through lectures in radio and television. In addition, Castberg served as rector of the university from 1952 to 1958. During his time as rector, political science was introduced as a separate discipline, being given its own department.

Castberg retired as a professor in 1963. From 1962 to 1976 he presided over the curatorium of The Hague Academy of International Law, an institution seated in the Peace Palace together with the International Court of Justice and the Permanent Court of Arbitration, and currently presided by Boutros Boutros-Ghali. Among Castberg's most important publications in this period are La philosophie de droit (1970), Den europeiske konvensjon om menneskerettighetene (1971), Minner om politikk og vitenskap fra årene 1900–1970 (1971) and Rett og revolusjon i Norge (1973).

Frede Castberg died in 1977 in Oslo.

Academic offices
Preceded by Otto Lous Mohr	Rector of the University of Oslo; 1952–1958	Succeeded by Johan Tidemann Ruud
