= Oscar Castberg =

Norwegian painter and sculptor

Oscar Ambrosius Castberg (30 September 1846 – 18 June 1917) was a Norwegian painter and sculptor.

== Biography ==
He was born in Bygland Municipality in Nedenes county, Norway . His father, physician Tycho Fredrik Edvard Castberg, was the oldest living son of priest and politician Peter Hersleb Harboe Castberg. Oscar Ambrosius Castberg was the nephew of customs surveyor Johan Christian Tandberg Castberg and first cousin of Johan and Torgrim Castberg. Oscar Ambrosius Castberg had one older brother, banker Peter Harboe Castberg.

Oscar Ambrosius Castberg first tried his luck at sea, but gave this up due to problems with seasickness. Instead, he took a sculptor's education, studying with a public grant under Julius Middelthun in Christiania and Jens Adolf Jerichau in Copenhagen. Due to the difficulty of surviving from sculpting alone, he also became a painter. He took up landscape painting on a naturalistic basis with motifs principally from Kristiania and the surrounding area. He is represented with one work in the National Gallery of Norway.

Castberg died in 1917 in Kristiania.
