= Johan Castberg =

Norwegian jurist and politician (1862–1926)

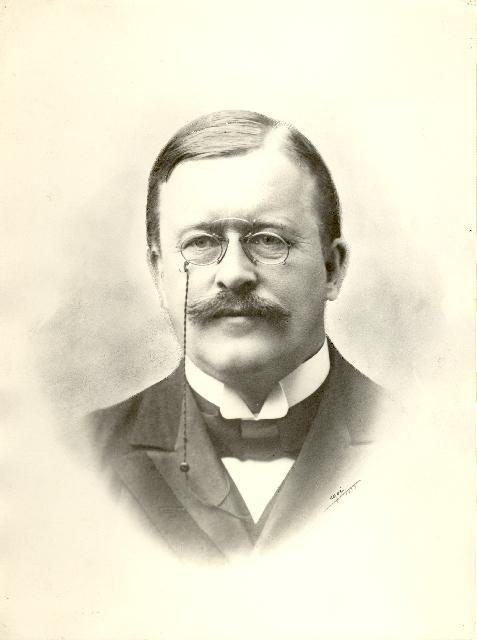
- Castberg in 1900.

Member of the Norwegian Parliament
- In office 1 January 1925 – 31 December 1927
- In office 1 January 1913 – 31 December 1921
- In office 1 January 1900 – 31 December 1909

Minister of Justice
- In office 19 March 1908 – 2 February 1910
- Prime Minister: Gunnar Knudsen
- Preceded by: Johan Bredal
- Succeeded by: Herman Scheel

Minister of Social Affairs
- In office 1 July 1913 – 22 April 1914
- Prime Minister: Gunnar Knudsen
- Preceded by: Position established
- Succeeded by: Kristian Friis Petersen

Minister of Trade
- In office 31 January 1913 – 1 July 1913
- Prime Minister: Gunnar Knudsen
- Preceded by: Ambortius Lindvig
- Succeeded by: Kristian Friis Petersen (1916)

Personal details
- Born: 21 September 1862 Brevik, Telemark, United Kingdoms of Sweden and Norway
- Died: 24 December 1926 (aged 64) Oslo, Norway
- Party: Liberal; Radical People's
- Spouse: Karen Cathrine Anker
- Relations: Peter H. H. Castberg (grandfather); Johan C. T. Castberg (father); Katti Anker Møller (sister-in-law)
- Children: Frede Castberg; Torgrim Castberg
- Occupation: Jurist

Johan Castberg (21 September 1862 – 24 December 1926) was a Norwegian jurist and politician best known for representing the Radical People's Party (Labour Democrats). He was a government minister from 1908 to 1910 and 1913 to 1914, and also served seven terms in the Norwegian Parliament. The brother-in-law of Katti Anker Møller, the two were responsible for implementing the highly progressive Castberg laws, granting rights to children born out of wedlock. Altogether, he was one of the most influential politicians in the early 20th century Norway.

In 2013, an oilfield in the Barents Sea was named after Johan Castberg.

== Personal life ==
Johan Castberg was born in Brevik as the son of customs surveyor and politician Johan Christian Tandberg Castberg (1827–1899) and Hanna Magdalene Frisak Ebbesen (1839–1881). He had several brothers and sisters, including the notable violinist Torgrim and the politician Leif.

His paternal grandfather Peter Hersleb Harboe Castberg was a priest and politician. In addition, Johan was a first cousin of sculptor Oscar Ambrosius Castberg. On the maternal side he was a grandson of Jørgen Tandberg Ebbesen and nephew of Just Bing Ebbesen, both of whom were involved in politics too.

Johan Castberg married Karen Cathrine Anker, sister of Katti Anker Møller, in 1892. Their son Frede became a professor. Through Torgrim Castberg, Johan Castberg was the uncle of illustrator Johan Christian Castberg.

== Career ==
=== Early career and local politics ===
Castberg took his secondary education in Skien in 1880, and enrolled in law studies. He graduated with the cand.jur. degree in 1884. Since 1882 he had written for the newspaper Oplandenes Avis in Hamar, which he also edited in the summers of 1882 and 1885. In 1885 he was hired as a clerk in the Ministry of Finance. He left both the newspaper and the Ministry of Finance in 1887, to pursue a career as an attorney. He worked one year in Hamar before moving to Gjøvik to work as a solicitor. He worked as a public defender in Eidsivating Court of Appeal from 1890 to 1892, and as prosecutor from 1892 to 1900.

While living in Gjøvik, he became involved in politics. He was a member of the executive committee of the municipal council of Gjøvik Municipality from 1896 to 1897. He also chaired the local chapter of the Liberal Party. In addition he held other local positions, chairing the local school board from 1895 to 1900 and the board of the local electricity company from 1896 to 1900.

=== Workers' societies ===
Parallel with the growing industrialisation of Norway, labor rights became a more central political question. The organization of labourers had been growing since the 1880s, and their representatives demanded an expanded social policy, as opposed to the philanthropic individual taking care of his employees. Workers' societies (arbeidersamfunn), which were not trade unions in the traditional sense, had existed since the middle of the nineteenth century. However, in 1885 a nationwide umbrella organization was founded, with the name De forenede norske Arbeidersamfund, DFNA. The organization aligned itself to the Liberal Party, one of two political parties in existence at that time.

Johan Castberg made his mark in DFNA at their 1888 national convention. This was one year after the foundation of the socialist Norwegian Labour Party, and Castberg, a non-socialist, vigorously advocated that the Liberal Party was the solution for the labour movement. On the other hand, DFNA became more of a pressure group towards the Liberal Party. Having included the eight-hour day and universal suffrage in their platform, it was decided that DFNA would compete directly with the Liberal Party if the local Liberal chapter did not support these cases. This led to the immediate establishment of a regional umbrella group in Hedemarkens Amt and Kristians Amt, named Oplandenes fælles Arbeiderforening. This particular organization had twenty-five local chapters. However, as local chapters of DFNA left to join the Labour Party instead, the support of this organization waned in some districts, especially in cities. DFNA was left with the mainly rural Hedemarkens Amt and Kristians Amt as its power base.

In 1900 Castberg was elected to the Norwegian Parliament for the first time, representing the constituency of Kristians Amt. He was indeed elected for Oplandenes fælles Arbeiderforening (called Arbeiderdemokratene in some sources although this name was formally adopted in 1911), but this organization was not an independent political party; rather it had loose ties to the Liberal Party. His power base being the workers' societies, Castberg was among the most radical members of the Liberal Party parliamentary group. In 1901 he founded a parliamentary caucus called Demokratisk reformgruppe.

=== Activity in 1905 ===
He was re-elected for the term 1904–1906. During this time the union between Sweden and Norway was the fundamental question. The 1903 election had seen a new party, the Union Party emerge. Their platform being based on promises of negotiations with Sweden concerning Norwegian rights to consulates, they got the Prime Minister position in the second cabinet Hagerup. Castberg, on the other hand, had marked himself as a staunch opponent of the union. In the years up to 1905, the unionists grew disillusioned with Sweden. The second cabinet Hagerup withdrew in March 1905 to make way for the cabinet Michelsen. Prime Minister Christian Michelsen had been among the founders of the Union Party. However, when forming his cabinet in 1905 he asked Castberg to join it. Castberg turned the offer down, choosing to continue working in Parliament.

In June the cabinet Michelsen unilaterally dissolved the union with Sweden. The summer of 1905 saw a Swedish reaction, coercing Norway to undergo negotiations in Karlstad. Castberg opposed the resulting Karlstad Treaty. In his diaries, he wrote that opponents of the Karlstad negotiations underwent censorship. Pamphlets were confiscated, and telephone conversations regarding the negotiations were sometimes interrupted. While a plebiscite on accepting Prince Carl of Denmark as King of Norway was held in November 1905, Castberg advocated the Republican form of government. In the plebiscite, Prince Carl was accepted with a 78.9% majority.

=== New party ===
In 1906 Castberg was among the founders of DFNA as an independent political party. It is often referred to as the Labour Democrats, Arbeiderdemokratene, a name it would formally adopt in 1911. Following the general election that year he was elected for a third term. He now represented the constituency Nordre Gudbrandsdalen, as the electoral system had been changed from plural member to single member constituencies. In addition to Nordre Gudbrandsdalen, the party won three constituencies: Søndre Gudbrandsdalen with Sigurd Andersen Fedje as their representative, Søndre Østerdalen with Olav Andreas Eftestøl and Søndre Hedemarken with Thore Embretsen Myrvang.

=== Government minister ===
On 19 March 1908 there was a change in government as the first cabinet Knudsen assumed office. Castberg was now appointed Minister of Justice and the Police. He lost this job when the first cabinet Knudsen fell on 1 February 1910. During this period his seat in Parliament was taken by Nils Gregoriussen Skilbred, though Castberg had not been re-elected in 1909. He did return to be re-elected for the term 1913–1915, this time for the constituency Søndre Gudbrandsdalen. However, in January 1913 he was again given a cabinet position, this time as Minister of Trade, Shipping and Industry in the second cabinet Knudsen. In June the same year the Ministry was reorganized, leaving Castberg as chief of a new Ministry of Social Affairs, Trade, Industry and Fisheries. His position known as Minister of Social Affairs for short, Castberg became the first government minister in Norway to have specific responsibility for social policy. He left the cabinet on 20 April 1914, due to disagreements with Prime Minister Gunnar Knudsen.

=== Later career ===
Castberg was re-elected in 1916, 1918 and 1925, and served as President of the Odelsting from 1914 to 1921. He continued as chairman of his party, renamed the Radical People's Party in 1921, until 1924. He was also engaged in international diplomacy: as a member of the Norwegian delegation that in 1919 discussed the establishment of the League of Nations, chairman of the delegation to an international workers' conference in Washington, DC 1919 and as a member of the delegation that in 1920 and 1921 met the wine-exporting countries affected by the 1919 Norwegian prohibition referendum.

Parallel to his career in politics, Castberg had pursued his career as a jurist. He was appointed acting public prosecutor in 1901, and got the job on a permanent basis in 1902. In 1906 he was appointed district stipendiary magistrate ('sorenskriver') in the district of Toten, Vardal og Biri. He held this job until 1924, except for the periods between 1908–1910 and 1913–1914, when he was a government minister. In December 1924 he was appointed Supreme Court Justice (the formal title was Supreme Court Assessor before 1927).

Johan Castberg died in December 1926 in Oslo, before the end of his seventh parliamentary term. He was replaced by Olav Mikkelsen Moe. The Radical People's Party more or less fell apart after his death, marginalized by the growing Labour Party.

His diaries were published posthumously in 1953, in two volumes, as Dagbøker 1900-1917. It is considered to be an important source for Norwegian political history.

Political offices
Preceded by Johan Olaf Bredal	Minister of Justice and the Police; 1908–1910	Succeeded by Herman Scheel
Preceded by Ambrotius Olsen Lindvig	Norwegian Minister of Social Affairs, Trade, Industry and Fisheries; 1913–1914	Succeeded by Kristian Friis Petersen
Party political offices
New office	Chairman of the Radical People's Party (Labour Democrats); 1906–1924	Succeeded by
