= Kaupanger =

Village in Sogndal Municipality, Norway

- Village
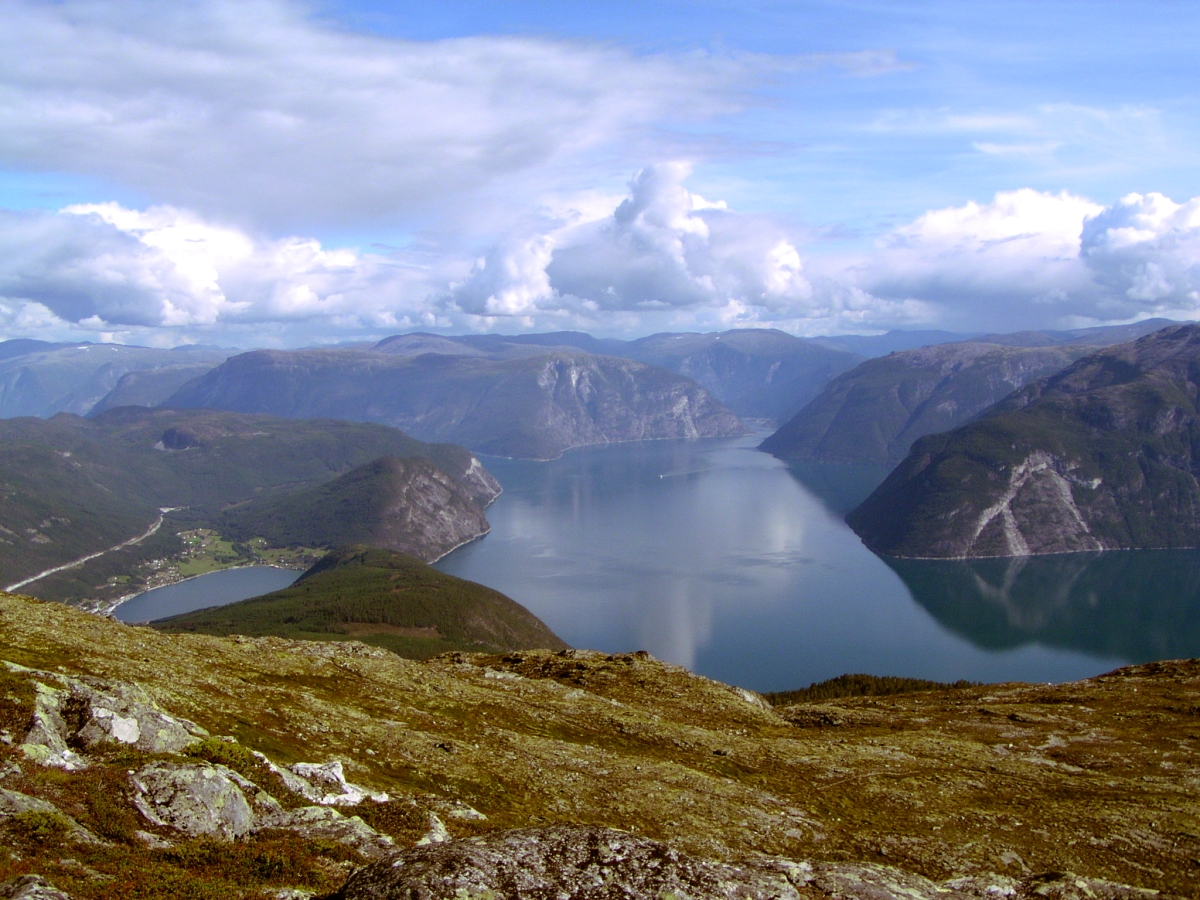
- View of Kaupanger (left) from Storhaugen mountain
- Interactive map of Kaupanger
- Location within Vestland Location within Norway
- Coordinates: 61.18453°N 7.24252°E
- Country: Norway
- Region: Western Norway
- County: Vestland
- District: Sogn
- Municipality: Sogndal Municipality

Area
  - Total: 1.22 km^{2} (0.47 sq mi)
- Elevation: 14 m (46 ft)

Population (2025)
  - Total: 1,167
  - Density: 957/km^{2} (2,480/sq mi)
- Time zone: UTC+01:00 (CET)
  - Summer (DST): UTC+02:00 (CEST)
- Post Code: 6854 Kaupanger

Kaupanger is a village situated along the northern shore of the Sognefjorden in Sogndal Municipality in Vestland county, Norway. It sits along the Norwegian National Road 5, about 12 kilometres (7.5 mi) southeast of the village of Sogndalsfjøra and about 8 kilometres (5.0 mi) northeast of the Sogndal Airport, Haukåsen. Kaupanger IL is a sports club located in Kaupanger.

The 1.22-square-kilometre (300-acre) village has a population (2025) of 1,167 and a population density of 957 inhabitants per square kilometre (2,480/sq mi).

== History ==
Kaupanger originated as a settlement during the Viking Age. Earlier, Kaupanger was known as Tingstad. Kaupang is an Old Norse term for a trading or market place so the village's name is composed of kaupa (which means "to buy") and angr (which means "fjord" or "inlet"), hence "buy inlet", similar to the literal translation of Copenhagen. The Kaupanger Stave Church is believed to have been built in the 12th century and it is still in existence in this village.
