= Johan Christian Castberg =

Norwegian illustrator, painter and musician (1911–1988)

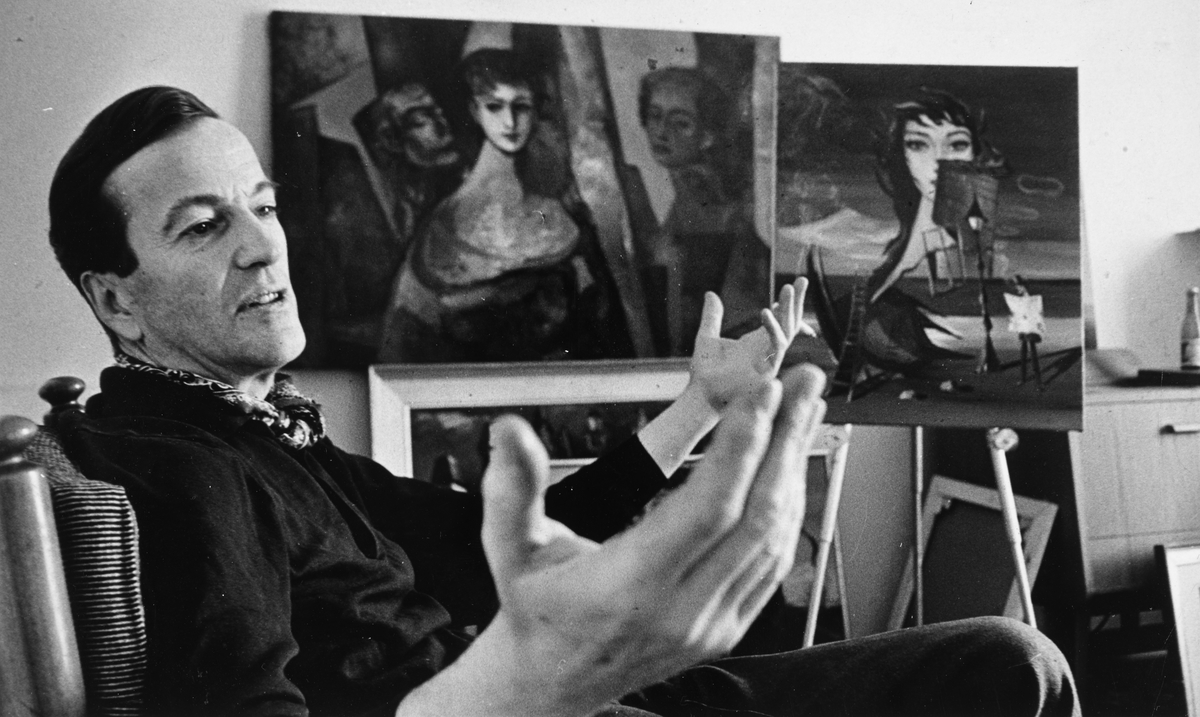
- Castberg in 1962
- Born: 1 February 1911; Bergen, Norway
- Died: 6 November 1988 (aged 77); Oslo
- Occupations: painter and illustrator
- Parent: Torgrim Castberg
- Relatives: Johan Christian Tandberg Castberg (grandfather); Johan Castberg (uncle); Herman Anker (grandfather); Katti Anker Møller (aunt); Ella Anker (aunt)

Johan Christian Castberg (1 February 1911 – 1988) was a Norwegian illustrator and painter.

He was born in Bergen to Ida Anker and Torgrim Castberg, and was married twice, to Fredrikke Mustad, and to the pianist Ingrid Kjellstrøm.

In the 1930s and 1940s, Castberg worked as an illustrator in Norwegian and Swedish newspapers. After the Second World War, he established himself as a portrait painter. He also painted surrealistic fantasy landscapes.
