= Just Bing Ebbesen =

Norwegian priest and politician (1847–1929)

Just Bing Ebbesen (17 April 1847 – 24 May 1929) was a Norwegian priest and politician.

Just Bing Ebbesen was the son of Jørgen Tandberg Ebbesen, and brother of Hanna Magdalene Frisak Ebbesen, who married Johan Christian Tandberg Castberg and was the mother of Johan Castberg.

He enrolled as a student in 1866 and graduated as cand.theol. in 1873. He worked as a chaplain for some years, before being appointed vicar in Stangvik in 1885. While stationed here he was elected to the Norwegian Parliament in 1889, representing the constituency of Romsdals Amt. He only served one term.

He was hired as postmaster in Tønsberg in 1891.
