= Peter Hersleb Harboe Castberg =

Norwegian politician

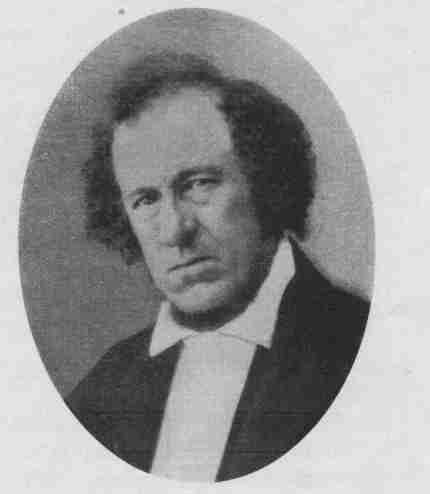
[Peter Hersleb Harboe Castberg] (1794-1858), Norwegian officer, pastor, mayor and member of parliament

Peter Hersleb Harboe Castberg (22 July 1794 – 10 June 1858) was a Norwegian priest and politician.

== Personal life ==
Peter Hersleb Harboe Castberg was born in Bergen as the son of Tycho Didrich Castberg (1755–1801) and his wife Helene Margaretha Calmeyer (1764–1830). He had several brothers and sisters.

Johan Castberg married Anne Margrethe Zimmer Henchel. They had five sons and three daughters, although two children died while young. Their son Johan Christian Tandberg Castberg became a customs surveyor and politician. Through him, Peter was the grandfather of politician Johan Castberg and violinist Torgrim Castberg, and great-grandfather of professor Frede Castberg. Through another son, physician Tycho Fredrik Edvard Castberg, Peter Hersleb Harboe was the father of banker Peter Harboe Castberg and sculptor Oscar Ambrosius Castberg.

== Career ==
Peter Hersleb Harboe Castberg worked most of his career as a vicar.

He was elected to the Norwegian Parliament in 1830 and 1833, representing the constituency Bratsberg Amt, and in 1836, 1839 and 1842, representing the constituency Laurvik og Sandefjord.

He died in 1858 in Copenhagen.
