= Jørgen Tandberg Ebbesen =

Norwegian politician (1812–1887)

Jørgen Tandberg Ebbesen (11 December 1812 – 16 July 1887) was a Norwegian politician for the Conservative Party.

Jørgen Tandberg Ebbesen was born in Fredrikstad as the son of Hans Christian Ebbesen (1774–1858) and Abigael Marie Bing (1785–1815). In July 1838 he married Henriette Sophie Frisak (1811–1888). They had several children. The next year he graduated with the cand.med. degree, moving to Sandefjord in 1839 to work as a physician.

Their daughter Margrethe married military officer Sophus Christensen. Their daughter Hanna Magdalene Frisak Ebbesen married Johan Christian Tandberg Castberg and was the mother of Johan Castberg, whereas their son Just Bing Ebbesen became a priest and politician.

Ebbesen was elected as a deputy representative to the Parliament of Norway during the term 1877–1879, representing the constituency of Laurvig og Sandefjord. On the local level he was mayor of Sandefjord Municipality for eleven years.

He died in 1887 in Sandefjord.
