= Johan Christian Tandberg Castberg =

Norwegian politician

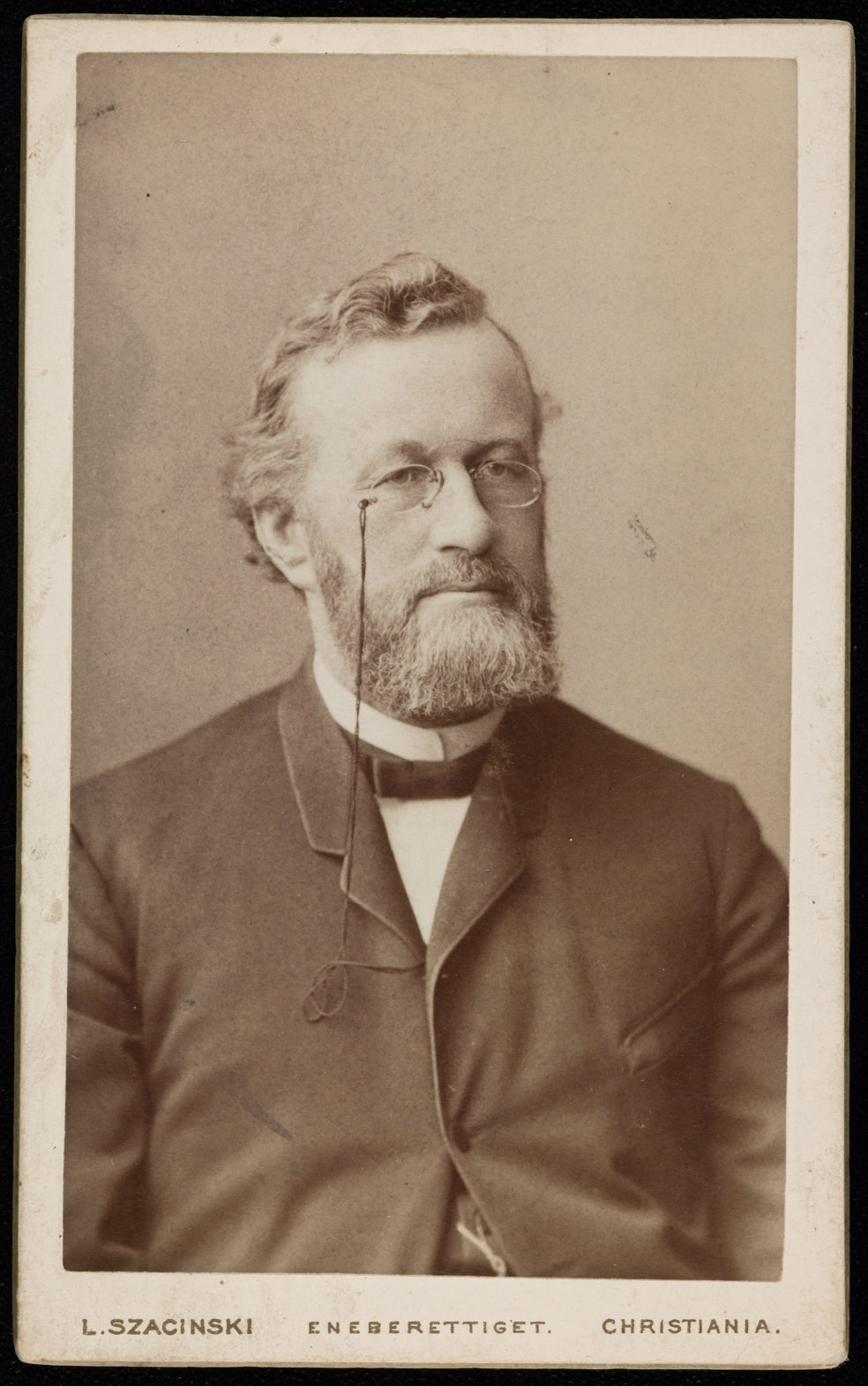
Johan Christian Tandberg Castberg, 1888

Johan Christian Tandberg Castberg (13 October 1827 – 8 December 1899) was a Norwegian politician. Spending his professional life as a customs surveyor, he was mayor of the cities Brevik and Skien, and served three terms in the Norwegian Parliament. He also founded the newspaper Varden, and was editor-in-chief for many years.

== Personal life ==
Johan Christian Tandberg Castberg was born in Fredrikstad as the son of priest and politician Peter Hersleb Harboe Castberg (1794–1858) and his wife Anne Margrethe Zimmer Henchel (1764–1830). He had several brothers and sisters.

In 1858 he married Hanna Magdalena Frisak Ebbesen (1794–1858), daughter of Jørgen Tandberg Ebbesen and sister of Just Bing Ebbesen. They had several sons and daughters, although some died while young. Their son Johan became one of the most influential politicians in Norway, and their son Torgrim was a noted violinist. Through Johan, Johan Christian was the grandfather of professor Frede Castberg.

Following the death of his wife in 1881, Johan Christian was married for a second time in 1887, to Olga Elvira Scheen (1853–1930).

== Career ==
Johan Christian Tandberg Castberg enrolled as a student in 1846, and graduated as cand.jur. in 1850. He worked as an attorney in Sandefjord, before his appointment as a customs surveyor in Brevik in 1856. He was promoted to head customs surveyor in 1866, and also served as mayor.

In 1871 he was hired as head customs surveyor in Skien. He was elected to the city council the next year, and later served as both deputy mayor and mayor. He was also elected to the Norwegian Parliament in 1877, 1880 and 1886, representing his city. He belonged to the Liberal Party, which had been founded in 1884. There were tensions in the Liberal Party in the late 1880s, culminating in the breakaway by their right wing in 1889 to found the Moderate Liberal Party. Castberg, on the other hand, was among the most radical members.

Castberg was also among the founders of the newspaper Varden. He was its first editor-in-chief, having this position from 1 January 1875 to September 1884. Varden still exists, but its Liberal Party allegiance was scrapped in 1953.

In 1887 he was hired as customs surveyor in Trondhjem. He died in that city in 1899, from a stroke.
