= Sognametal =

Video by Windir
- Released: 20 June 2005
- Genre: Black metal, folk metal, Viking metal
- Length: 1:14:00
- Language: Sognamål, English
- Label: Tabu
- Producer: Windir

Windir chronology
Valfar, ein Windir (2004)	Sognametal (2005)

Sognametal is a live DVD by Windir released in 2005. It was performed and recorded in Rockefeller Auditorium, Oslo, on 3 September 2004, the day that would have been Valfar's 26th birthday. Sognametal is the last material released by Windir and marks the ultimate end of the band.

Sture did the majority of vocals on the DVD, but it also includes guest vocals by Cosmocrator, and Valfar's brother Vegard.

== Concert setlist ==
1. "Sognariket Sine Krigarar"
2. "On the Mountain of Goats"
3. "Svartesmeden og Lundamyrstrollet"
4. "Stridsmann"
5. "1184"
6. "Blodssvik"
7. "Fagning"
8. "Krigaren si Gravferd"
9. "Arntor, ein Windir"

== Bonus content ==
1. "Sognariket Sine Krigarar" (Stallen, Gaupne, 1996)
2. "Ending" (with Ulcus. Meieriet, Sogndal, 2001)
3. "The Spiritlord" (Meieriet, Sogndal, 2001)
4. "Heidra" (Heidra (Betong, Oslo, 2001)
5. "Dance of Mortal Lust" (Inferno, 2002)
6. "1184" (Meieriet, Sogndal, 2002)
7. "Despot" (1001 watt, Skien, 2003)

== Personnel ==
- Sture – vocals, rhythm guitar
- Vegard Bakken – vocals
- Hvàll – bass
- Steingrim – drums
- Strom – lead guitar
- Righ – synth
- Cosmocrator – clean vocals
