= Arntor =

Studio album by Windir
- Released: 11 October 1999
- Recorded: August–October 1998
- Genres: Melodic black metal, Viking metal, folk metal
- Length: 46:07
- Language: Sognamål
- Label: Head Not Found
- Producer: Pytten

Windir chronology
Sóknardalr (1997)	Arntor (1999)	1184 (2001)

Arntor is the second studio album by Norwegian black metal band Windir. It was released on 11 October 1999 through the record label Head Not Found. It is the last record released with Valfar playing the majority of the instruments. It was repressed on vinyl and cassette in 2020.

== Music ==
The album's style is black/Viking metal, fusing various elements of polka, folk music and orchestra. The guitar work employs occasional staccato riffs. Vocally, it contains both screaming and heavy metal singing. Some of the material has drawn comparisons to Enslaved's later output.

== Reception and legacy ==
Professional ratings
Review scores
Source	Rating
AllMusic	4.5/5 stars

AllMusic praised the album, writing, "this album's importance in the grand scheme of Scandinavian heavy metal is difficult to overstate, and if Sweden's Bathory were responsible for introducing the Viking metal concept to begin with, then the watershed Arntor gave Windir a strong case as heirs to their throne, by showing the way forward for the genre's future disciples."

The album's influence has been observed in the works of Romanian black metal band Negură Bunget and the Ukrainian band Drudkh. Swedish progressive death metal band An Abstract Illusion covered "Svartesmeden og lundamyrstrollet" on their 2016 debut album Illuminate the Path.

== Track listing ==
No.	Title	Length
1.	"Byrjing" ("The Beginning")	3:17
2.	"Arntor, ein windir" ("Arntor, a Warrior")	6:56
3.	"Kong Hydnes haug" ("The Burial Mound of King Hydnes")	6:36
4.	"Svartesmeden og lundamyrstrollet" (The Blacksmith and the Troll of Lundamyri")	9:02
5.	"Kampen" ("The Struggle")	6:35
6.	"Saknet" ("The Longing")	10:03
7.	"Ending"	3:38
Total length:		46:07

== Personnel ==
- Valfar – guitar, bass guitar, synthesizer, vocals, accordion, producer, mixing

=== Additional personnel ===
- B. T. Aroy – keyboards on "Ending"
- I. R. Aroy – guitars on tracks 2, 4 and 6
- Steinarson – clean vocals
- Steingrim – drums
- Harjar – lead guitars on "Kong Hydnes haug" and "Kampen"
- Vegard Bakken – photography
- Erik Evju – layout
- J. E. Bjork – graphic design
- Pytten – mixing
