= Winter at the Sognefjord =

Painting by Johan Christian Dahl

- Vinter ved Sognefjorden (Norwegian)
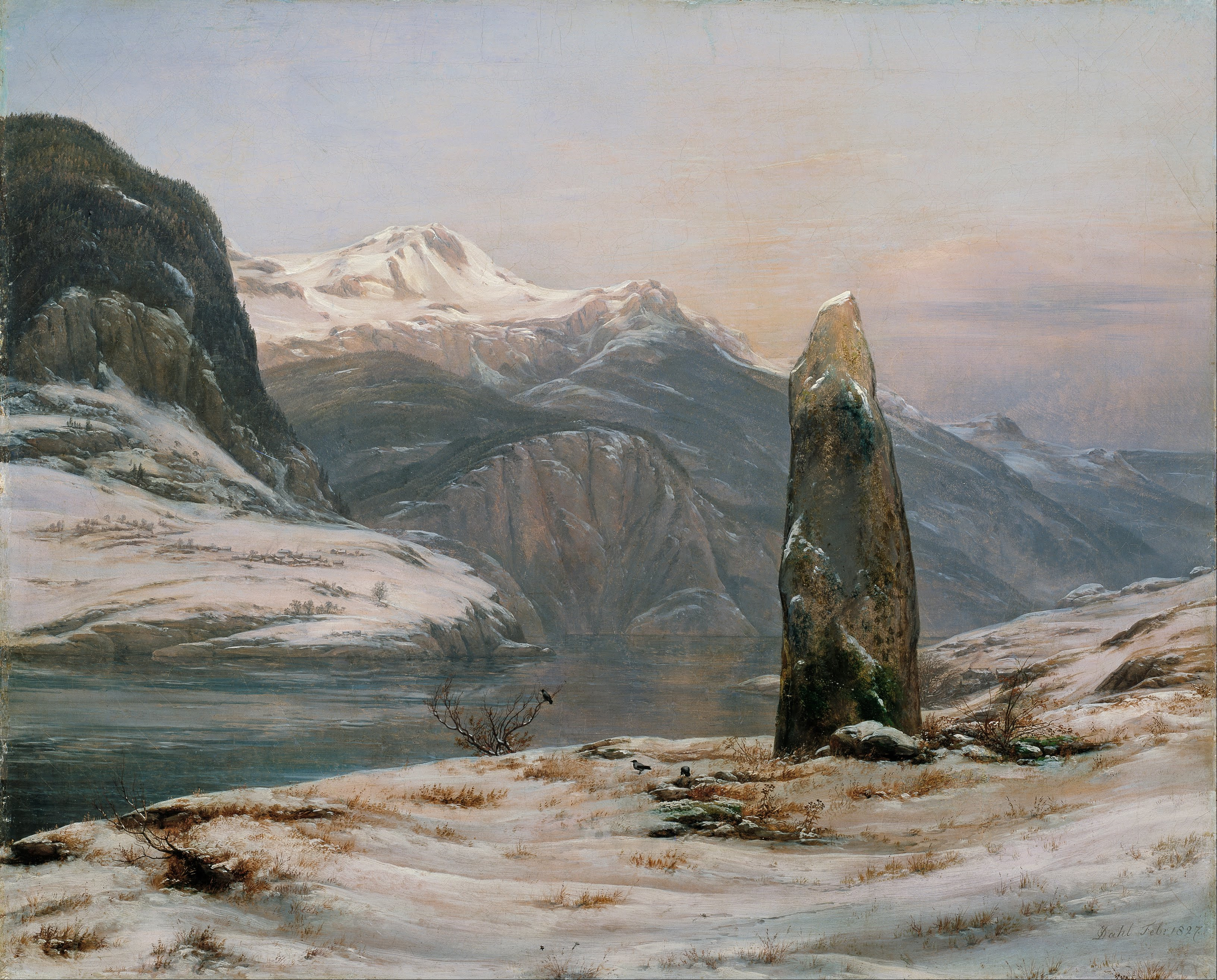
- Artist: Johan Christian Dahl
- Year: 1827
- Medium: oil on canvas
- Dimensions: 61.5 cm × 75.5 cm (24.2 in × 29.7 in)
- Location: National Gallery, Oslo

Winter at the Sognefjord (Norwegian: Vinter ved Sognefjorden) is a painting by the Norwegian artist Johan Christian Dahl from 1827. The picture is painted in oil on canvas and has the dimensions of 61.5 x 75.5 cm. It is held at the National Museum of Art, Architecture and Design, in Oslo.

== History and description ==
After a trip to Italy in 1820–1821, Johan Christian Dahl settled permanently in Dresden. There he drew a number of ideal Norwegian landscapes. From 1826 on, there was a change in his work reflecting new understanding for Norwegian landscape. Then he took a trip through Norway from Christiania to Telemark and Hardangervidda to the fjords of western Norway, his first trip to the mountains as a mature artist.

The motive was first drafted as a drawing during the trip. Steep slopes and vertical rock are depicted in the foreground. This painting is a tribute to the majestic Norwegian nature and the proud history of the nation.

The painting shows a view from Nornes across the Sognefjord towards the farmyard of Fimreite, which can only be glimpsed. It is a winter morning, but not with many snow. The sky is blue and the sunlight creates warmth in the scene. In the background there are light, pink clouds. In the foreground stands a dramatic, tall standing stone, which contrasts with the rather flat landscape on this side of the fjord. Further back in the painting, on the other side of the fjord, there steep mountain slopes. The standing stone is probably meant to commemorate the Battle of Fimreite, in 1184, which marked the start of a golden age for Norway. The sunlight shining on the top of the standing stone has been interpreted as a sign of hope for a new golden age.

The scene is devoid of people, but some crows can be seen in front of the standing stone. Crows can portend misfortune and death, and testify to the dramatic nature of the battle site.
