= 1184 (album) =

Studio album by Windir
- Released: November 19, 2001
- Recorded: Akkerhaugen Lydstudio, June–July 2001
- Genres: Melodic black metal, folk metal
- Length: 51:34
- Languages: English, German, Sognamål
- Label: Head Not Found
- Producers: Valfar, Hvåll, Thorbjørn Akkerhaugen

Windir chronology
Arntor (1999)	1184 (2001)	Likferd (2003)

Professional ratings
Review scores
Source	Rating
AllMusic	3/5 stars

1184 is the third studio album by Windir, released in 2001. Valfar composed this album with the band Ulcus. Departing from the sound for which Windir is normally known, it nevertheless kept its folk elements, albeit with inspiration from electronic music. The art used in the album cover is a painting by the Norwegian artist Johan Christian Dahl called "Winter at the Sognefjord".

== Track listing ==
- All songs written and arranged by Valfar & Hvåll.

No.	Title	Length
1.	"Todeswalzer"	4:54
2.	"1184"	5:28
3.	"Dance of Mortal Lust"	5:45
4.	"The Spiritlord"	6:11
5.	"Heidra"	8:18
6.	"Destroy"	6:30
7.	"Black New Age"	4:54
8.	"Journey to the End"	9:34
Total length:		51:34

== Personnel ==
=== Windir ===
- Terje Bakken (Valfar) – vocals, accordion, programming, additional bass guitar, guitar and synthesizer
- Strom – lead guitar
- Sture – rhythm guitar
- Righ – synthesizer
- Hvàll – bass guitar
- Steingrim – drums

=== Additional personnel ===
- Cosmocrator – clean vocals

== Production ==
- Produced, recorded, engineered and mixed by Thorbjørn Akkerhaugen, Valfar and Hvåll
- Mastered by Tom Kvalsvoll
