= Sóknardalr =

Studio album by Windir
- Released: 23 March 1997
- Genre: Melodic black metal, Viking metal, folk metal
- Length: 47:35
- Language: Sognamål
- Label: Head Not Found

Windir chronology
Det gamle riket (1996)	Sóknardalr (1997)	Arntor (1999)

Sóknardalr is the debut studio album by Norwegian black metal band Windir. It was released in March 1997 through the Head Not Found record label.

== Background ==
Sóknardalr is the old Norse name of Valfar's hometown Sogndal. The lyrics are written in the Sogndal dialect, and the song titles in Nynorsk, the official writing form of Sogndal Municipality.

=== Musical style ===
AllMusic described the album as "[fusing] layers upon layers of keyboards and guitars on an almost unprecedented scale (mid-period Bathory being the one obvious inspirational touchstone), culminating in sweeping, mini-symphonies", featuring "synthesizer melodies [that] would become signature Windir hallmarks."

== Critical reception ==
Professional ratings
Review scores
Source	Rating
AllMusic	3.5/5 stars

AllMusic wrote, "In an almost singular case study within the annals of Scandinavian black metal, where groups require several years and albums in which to experiment, develop and mature their sound, Sóknardalr saw Windir springing fully formed like Athena from the head of Zeus".

== Track listing ==
No.	Title	Length
1.	"Sognariket sine krigarar" ("Warriors of Sognariket")	5:35
2.	"Det som var Haukareid" ("That Which Was Haukareid")	5:40
3.	"Mørket sin fyrste" ("The Dark's Prince")	7:26
4.	"Sognariket si herskarinne" ("Empress of Sognariket")	4:17
5.	"I ei krystallnatt" ("In a Crystal Night")	5:15
6.	"Røvhaugane" ("The Røvhaugs")	5:32
7.	"Likbør"	8:08
8.	"Sóknardalr"	5:42
Total length:		47:35

== Personnel ==
- Valfar - vocals, all instruments, producer, mixing, photography

=== Additional personnel ===
- Steingrim - drums
- Steinarson - clean vocals
- Krohg - mixing, logo, artwork
- J. E. Bjork - mastering, graphic design
