= Nornes =

Nornes may refer to:

== Places ==
- Nornes, Norway, a village in Sogndal municipality, Sogn og Fjordane county, Norway

== People ==
- Jan Frode Nornes, a retired Norwegian footballer
- Bud Nornes, a Minnesota (USA) politician and member of the Minnesota House of Representatives
