= Likferd =

Studio album by Windir
- Released: March 27, 2003
- Recorded: December 2002–January 2003 at Akkerhuagen Lydstudio
- Genre: Atmospheric black metal, folk metal
- Length: 48:40
- Language: English, Sognamål
- Label: Head Not Found

Windir chronology
1184 (2001)	Likferd (2003)	Valfar, ein Windir (2004)

Professional ratings
Review scores
Source	Rating
AllMusic	4/5 stars

Likferd is the fourth and final full-length studio album by Norwegian black metal band Windir, which was released in 2003. It was the last official album released by Windir before the death of vocalist Valfar.

== Track listing ==
- All songs written by Valfar & Hvàll.

No.	Title	Length
1.	"Resurrection of the Wild"	5:52
2.	"Martyrium"	5:00
3.	"Despot"	6:01
4.	"Blodssvik"	5:47
5.	"Fagning"	8:31
6.	"On the Mountain of Goats"	5:24
7.	"Dauden"	4:19
8.	"Ætti mørkna"	7:46
Total length:		48:40

== Personnel ==
- Valfar – vocals and additional instruments
- Hvàll – bass
- Steingrim – drums
- Sture – rhythm guitar
- Strom – lead guitar
- Righ – synth

=== Additional personnel ===
- Cosmocrator – clean vocals
- Tom Kvalsvoll - mastering
- Thorbjørn Akkerhaugen - mixing, co-producer
- Stig Ese - producer, mixing
