= Black Brigade =

Black Brigade may refer to:

- Black Brigades, Fascist paramilitary groups operating in northern Italy during the final years of World War II, and after the signing of the Italian Armistice in 1943
- Certain Polish military units in World War II, including:
  - 10th Motorized Cavalry Brigade (Poland)
  - 10th Armoured Cavalry Brigade (Poland)
  - 1st Armoured Division (Poland)
- Racially segregated military units in United States history, including:
  - The Black Brigade, a 24-strong Loyalist military unit consisting largely of Black Loyalists, or formerly enslaved African Americans or who escaped to the British during the American Revolutionary War
  - Black Brigade of Cincinnati, a military unit made up of African Americans organized during the Civil War to protect the city of Cincinnati in 1862

Fictional

- Black Brigade (film), the DVD release title of the 1970 television movie Carter's Army about a squad of all black troops charged with securing an important hydro dam in Nazi Germany

== See also ==
- Pitch Black Brigade, the second album by the Norwegian band Vreid
- The Black Order Brigade, a translation of the French graphic novel political thriller Les Phalanges de l'Ordre Noir by Pierre Christin
