= Ølmheim Church =

Church in Vestland, Norway

- Ølmheim kyrkje
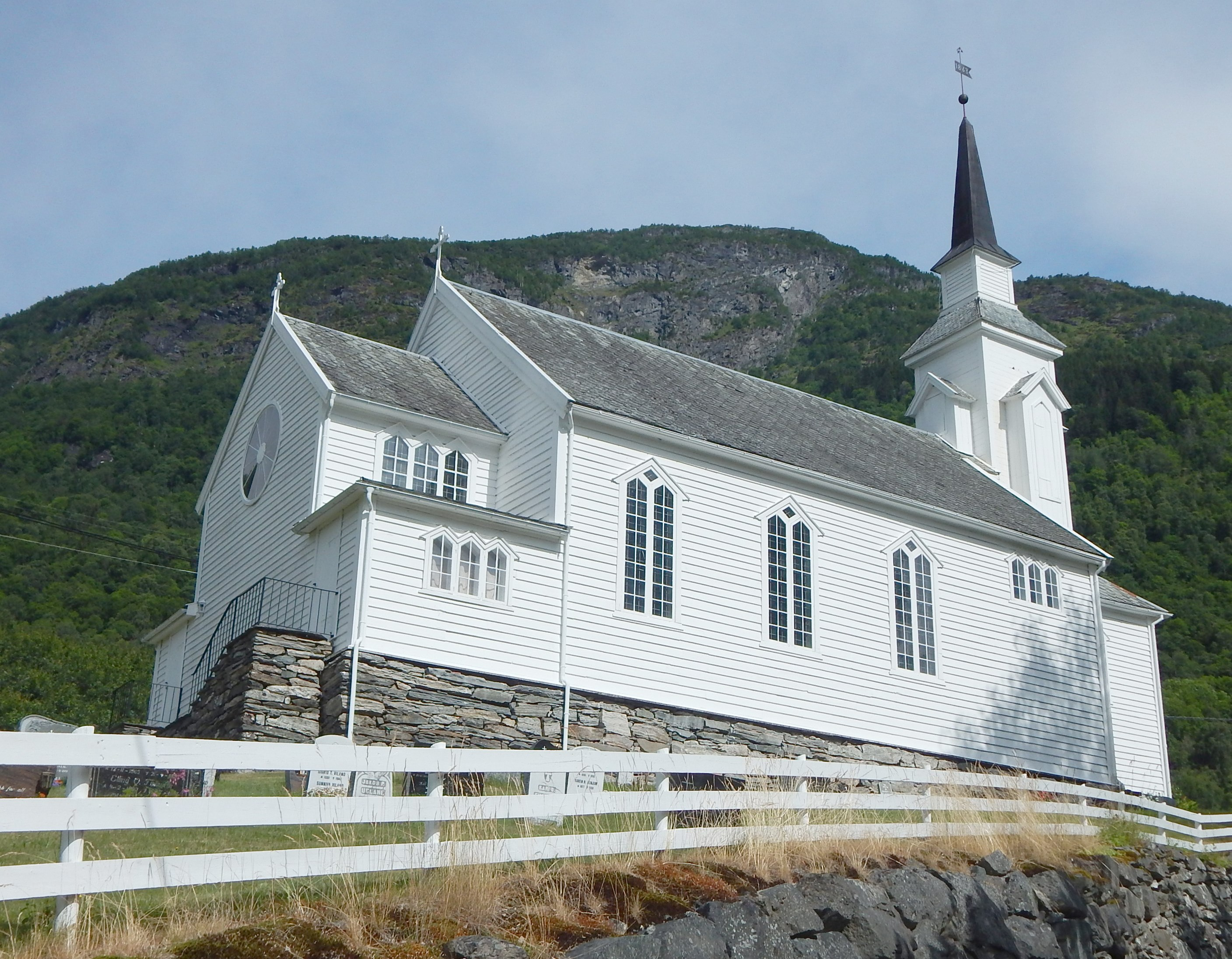
- View of the church
- Ølmheim Church
- 61°10′15″N 6°59′39″E
- Location: Sogndal Municipality, Vestland
- Country: Norway
- Denomination: Church of Norway
- Previous denomination: Catholic Church
- Churchmanship: Evangelical Lutheran

History
- Former name(s): Norum Church; Ylmheim Church
- Status: Parish church
- Founded: 13th century
- Consecrated: 1863

Architecture
- Functional status: Active
- Architect: Christian Heinrich Grosch
- Architectural type: Long church
- Completed: 1863 (163 years ago)

Specifications
- Capacity: 230
- Materials: Wood

Administration
- Diocese: Bjørgvin bispedømme
- Deanery: Sogn prosti
- Parish: Norum
- Norwegian Cultural Heritage Site
- Type: Church
- Status: Listed
- ID: 85175

Ølmheim Church (Norwegian: Ølmheim kyrkje) is a parish church of the Church of Norway in Sogndal Municipality in Vestland county, Norway. It is located in the village of Nornes, on the northern shore of the Sogndalsfjorden. It is the church for the Norum parish which is part of the Sogn prosti (deanery) in the Diocese of Bjørgvin. The white, wooden church was built in a long church design in 1863 using plans drawn up by the architect Christian Henrik Grosch. The church seats about 230 people.

== History ==
The earliest existing historical records of the church date back to the year 1308, but the church was not new that year. The first church here was a wooden stave church that was likely built in the 13th century on a site about 20 metres (66 ft) east of the present church site. Sometime before 1686, the old choir was torn down and a new timber-framed choir was built to replace it. The old church was in use until 1700 or 1701 when it burned down. A new cruciform church was built in 1703 to replace it. The new church was built by Askild Tepstad. Over time, the new church was too small for the congregation, so in 1863 a new church was constructed about 20 metres (66 ft) to the west of the old church. The new building was designed by Christian Henrik Grosch and the lead builder was Ole Olson Løken. After the new building was completed, the old church was torn down.

On 15 January 1989, lightning struck the tower and it started burning. The fire department was alerted and arrived quickly enough that they had extinguished the fire before the whole church was destroyed. The tower was rebuilt in the autumn of the same year, and it looks the same as before.

== Name ==
Historically, the church had been called Ylmheim Church (or Ølmheim Church), after the name of the nearby farm. However, starting around the year 1840, the church and the parish were named Norum. In 2015, the church was renamed using the historic Ølmheim name, but the parish name remained as Norum.

== See also ==
- List of churches in Bjørgvin
