= Valfar, ein Windir =

Compilation album by Windir
- Released: November 2, 2004
- Genre: Black metal Folk metal Viking metal
- Length: 2:15:10
- Language: Sognamål; English
- Label: Tabu

Windir chronology
Likferd (2003)	Valfar, ein Windir (2004)	Sognametal (2005)

Professional ratings
Review scores
Source	Rating
AllMusic	4/5 stars

Valfar, ein Windir is a 2-disc compilation album by Windir, released in 2004 as a tribute to the band's founder, Terje "Valfar" Bakken, after his death. It contains some new recordings, tributes, live songs, and re-recordings. The money made with selling Valfar, ein Windir goes straight to Valfar's family. A version of the album that does not include the second disc was also released later.

== Track listing ==
CD 1

1. "Stri" (Battle) – 1:25 (new recording)
2. "Stridsmann" (Warrior) – 5:54 (new recording)
3. "Dans på Stemmehaugen" – 6:29 (re-recording)
4. "The Profound Power" – 4:57 (re-recording; originally by Ulcus, previous band of Hvàll, Steingrim, Sture, Strom and Righ)
5. "Dauden" (Death) – 5:12 (performed by Enslaved)
6. "Ending" – 2:57 (performed by Finntroll)
7. "Mørkets fyrste" (The Lord of Darkness) – 7:26 (performed by E-head)
8. "Destroy" – 4:56 (performed by Notodden All Stars)
9. "Likbør" – 5:26 (performed by Weh)
10. "Svartasmeden og Lundamyrstrollet" – 9:14 (live)
11. "Blodssvik" – 7:44 (live)

CD 2

1. "Soge II: Framkomsten" – 1:33
2. "Krigaren si gravferd" – 6:24
3. "Sognariket sine krigarar" – 5:35
4. "Byrjing" – 3:17
5. "Arntor, ein Windir" – 6:56
6. "Saknet" – 10:03
7. "1184" – 5:28
8. "Journey to the End" – 9:34
9. "Martyrium" – 5:00
10. "Fagning" – 8:31
11. "On the Mountain of Goats" – 5:24
12. "Sóknardalr" – 5:45
