= Terje Bakken =

Valfar

Background information
- Born: Terje Bakken; 3 September 1978
- Origin: Norway
- Died: 14 January 2004 (aged 25)
- Genres: Black metal, Viking metal, folk metal
- Instruments: Vocals, accordion, guitar, bass, drums, synthesizer, keyboards, programming
- Years active: 1994–2004
- Formerly of: Windir

Terje "Valfar" Bakken (3 September 1978 – 14 January 2004) was the lead singer and founder of the Norwegian black metal band Windir. Windir was started as a one-man project, but it was expanded into a full band with the release of their third album, 1184. Valfar originally sang his lyrics in Sognamål, a dialect of Norwegian, but eventually switched to English in an attempt to appeal to a broader audience.

== Biography ==
Valfar was born and grew up in Sogndal Municipality, of which he was very proud, and which later proved central to his lyrics. Terje decided to form Windir into a full band while he was at college, with some of his classmates becoming the other band members.

Valfar released two demos, Sogneriket and Det Gamle Riket.

His second studio album, Arntor, was the last Windir album recorded solely by Valfar.

Despite his vocal style, Valfar did not relate his music to black metal, probably because of how the scene acted and was stereotyped. He instead dubbed Windir's musical style as "Sognametal". Other bands that have a Sognametal sound are Cor Scorpii, Vreid, Feigd, Mistur, and Sigtyr. He studied Sogndal history extensively and his poems stemmed from it.

=== Death ===
On 14 January 2004, Valfar went for a walk towards his family's cabin at Fagereggi, but he never arrived. Three days later, authorities found his body at Reppastølen in the Sogndal Valley. Valfar had been caught in a snow storm and died from hypothermia.

He was buried at Stedje Church in Sogndal Municipality on 27 January 2004.

Terje Bakken's grave

Nearly two months after his death, the remaining members of Windir decided to disband.

== Discography ==
- Sogneriket (demo, 1995)
- Det Gamle Riket (demo, 1995)
- Sóknardalr (full-length, 1997)
- Arntor (full-length, 1999)
- 1184 (full-length, 2001)
- Likferd (full-length, 2003)
- Valfar, ein Windir (compilation, 2004)
