= Stedje Church =

Church in Vestland, Norway

- Stedje kyrkje
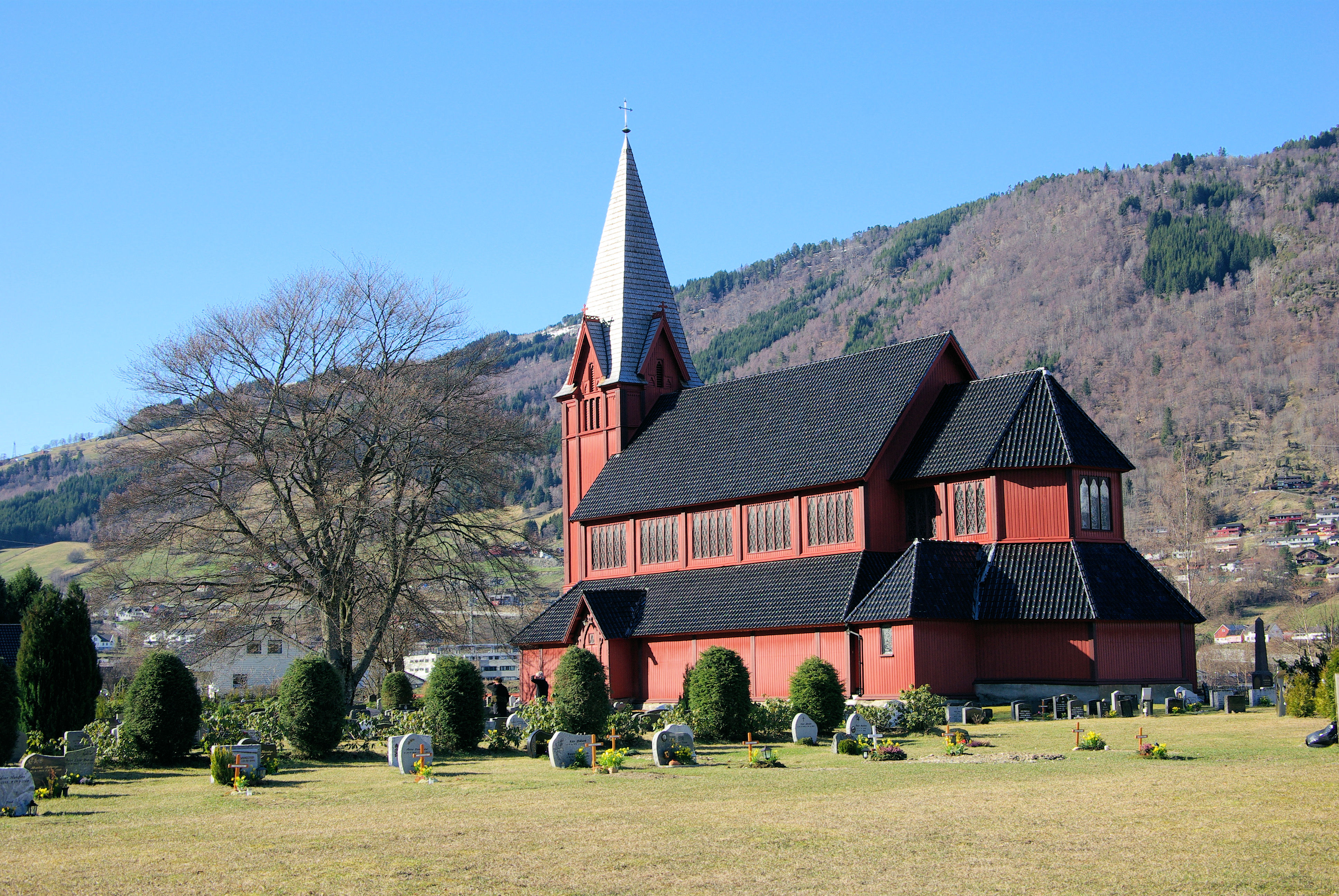
- View of the church
- Stedje Church
- 61°13′36″N 7°05′44″E
- Location: Sogndal Municipality, Vestland
- Country: Norway
- Denomination: Church of Norway
- Previous denomination: Catholic Church
- Churchmanship: Evangelical Lutheran

History
- Status: Parish church
- Founded: c. 1180
- Consecrated: 17 Dec 1867

Architecture
- Functional status: Active
- Architect: Christian Christie
- Architectural type: Long church
- Completed: 1867 (159 years ago)

Specifications
- Capacity: 400
- Materials: Wood

Administration
- Diocese: Bjørgvin bispedømme
- Deanery: Sogn prosti
- Parish: Stedje
- Norwegian Cultural Heritage Site
- Type: Church
- Status: Listed
- ID: 85557

Stedje Church (Norwegian: Stedje kyrkje) is a parish church of the Church of Norway in Sogndal Municipality in Vestland county, Norway. It is located in the village of Sogndalsfjøra, near the shore of the Sogndalsfjorden. It is the church for the Stedje parish which is part of the Sogn prosti (deanery) in the Diocese of Bjørgvin. The red, wooden church was built in a long church design in 1867 using plans drawn up by the architect Christian Christie. The church seats about 400 people.

== History ==
The earliest existing historical records of the church date back to the year 1327, but it was not new that year. The church is also referenced in the book, Sverris saga which was written around the year 1200. The first church in Stedje was a wooden stave church which was located on the same site as the present church building. The church was likely built around the year 1180. Tradition states that Saint Olaf himself chose the site of the church (there is a runestone near the church that tends to support this story) but, if this is the case, then there may have been a small church built here in the 11th century that was replaced with a new building in 1180. According to the book Sverris saga, the Stedje farm was set on fire on 15 June 1184 by King Sverre's army. The area was burned as revenge for a murder just before the Battle of Fimreite but the new church was spared and protected by soldiers. The nave of the old stave church measured 14.5 by 10 metres (48 ft × 33 ft) and it had a small choir on the east end of the building. The ceiling height in the nave reached 15.5 metres (51 ft) in the centre of the room. In 1607 the choir of the old stave church was torn down because it was too small. A new, larger choir was rebuilt on the same site. The new timber-framed choir measured 9-by-7.2-metre (30 ft × 24 ft). In 1680 the old tower was taken down and rebuilt.

In 1814 this church served as an election church (Norwegian: valgkirke). Together with more than 300 other parish churches across Norway, it was a polling station for elections to the 1814 Norwegian Constituent Assembly which wrote the Constitution of Norway. This was Norway's first national elections. Each church parish was a constituency that elected people called "electors" who later met together in each county to elect the representatives for the assembly that was to meet at Eidsvoll Manor later that year.

By the 1860s, the old church had proven to be too small for the parish, so it was decided to tear down the old church and rebuild a new one on the same site. The parish hired Johannes Øvsthus to design an octagonal church, but he failed to meet the deadline for planning the new building, so he lost the job. Next, Christian Christie was hired and he designed a large stave church-inspired building. In June 1867, the old church was torn down. Immediately after, work began on the new timber-framed long church. Like several of Christie's churches, the church was prefabricated and transported to the site for final construction. The new building was consecrated on 17 December 1867 by the Bishop Peter Hersleb Graah Birkeland. Upon completion, the cost of the church had exceeded the budget by 50%.

== Media gallery ==
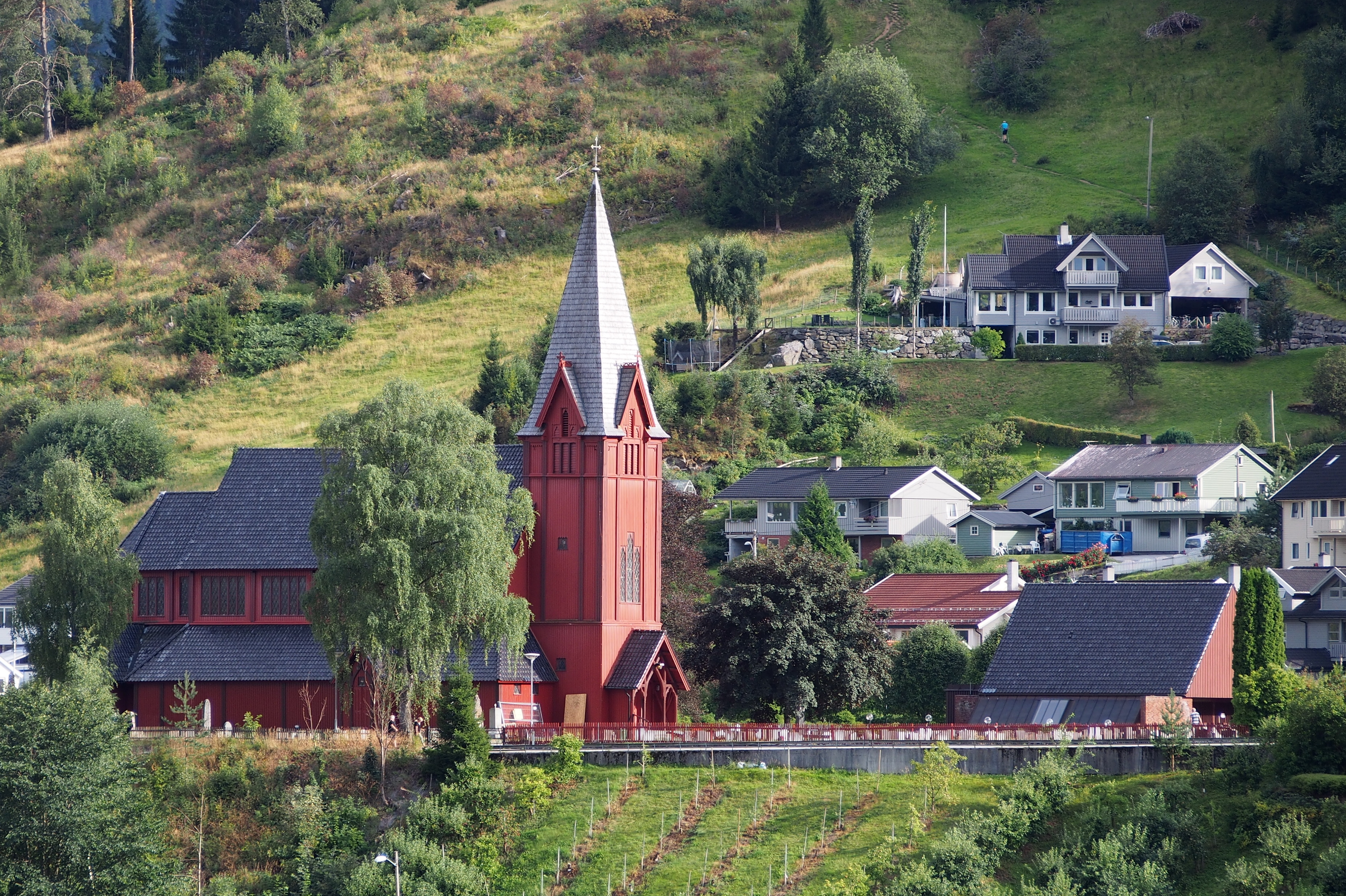

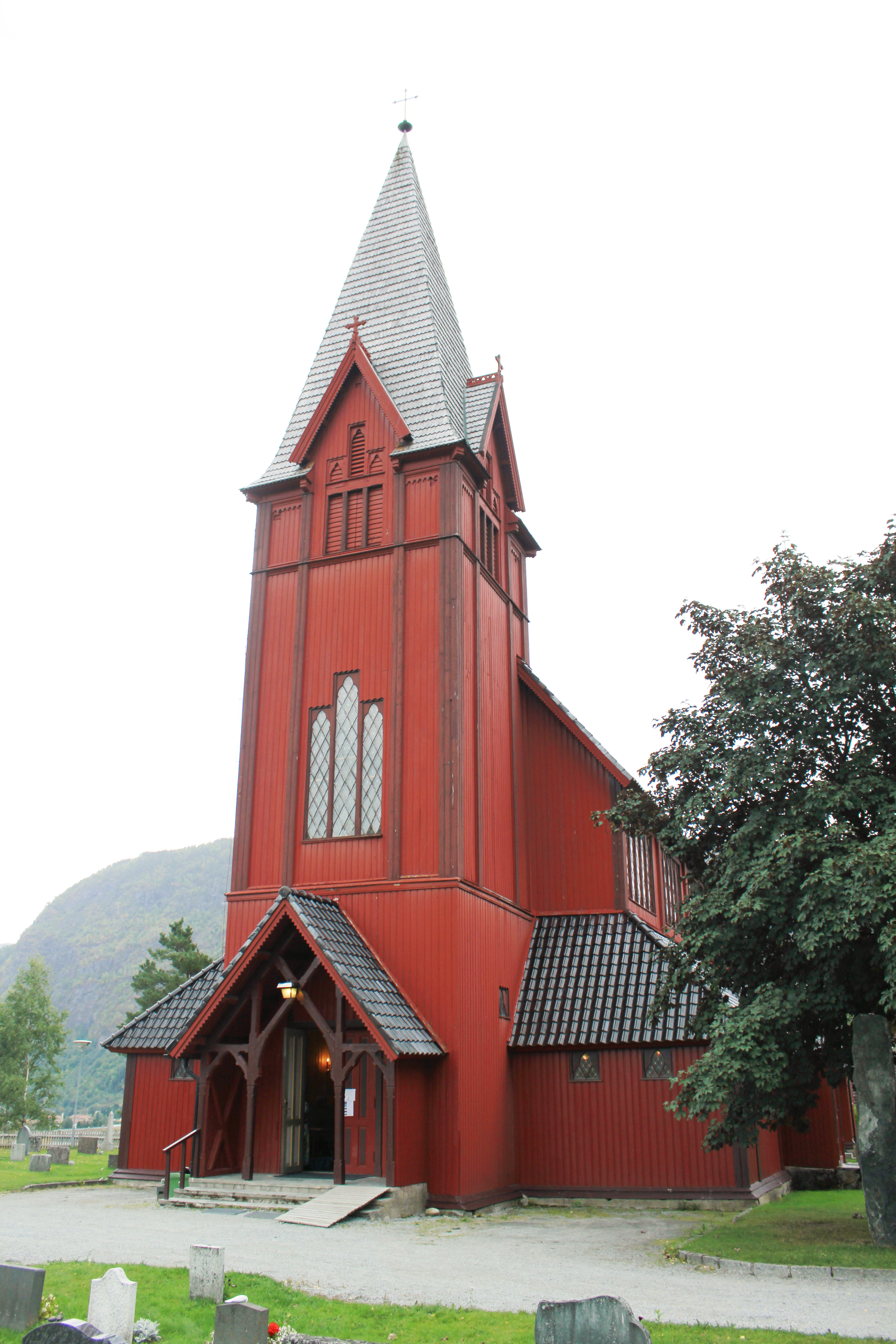

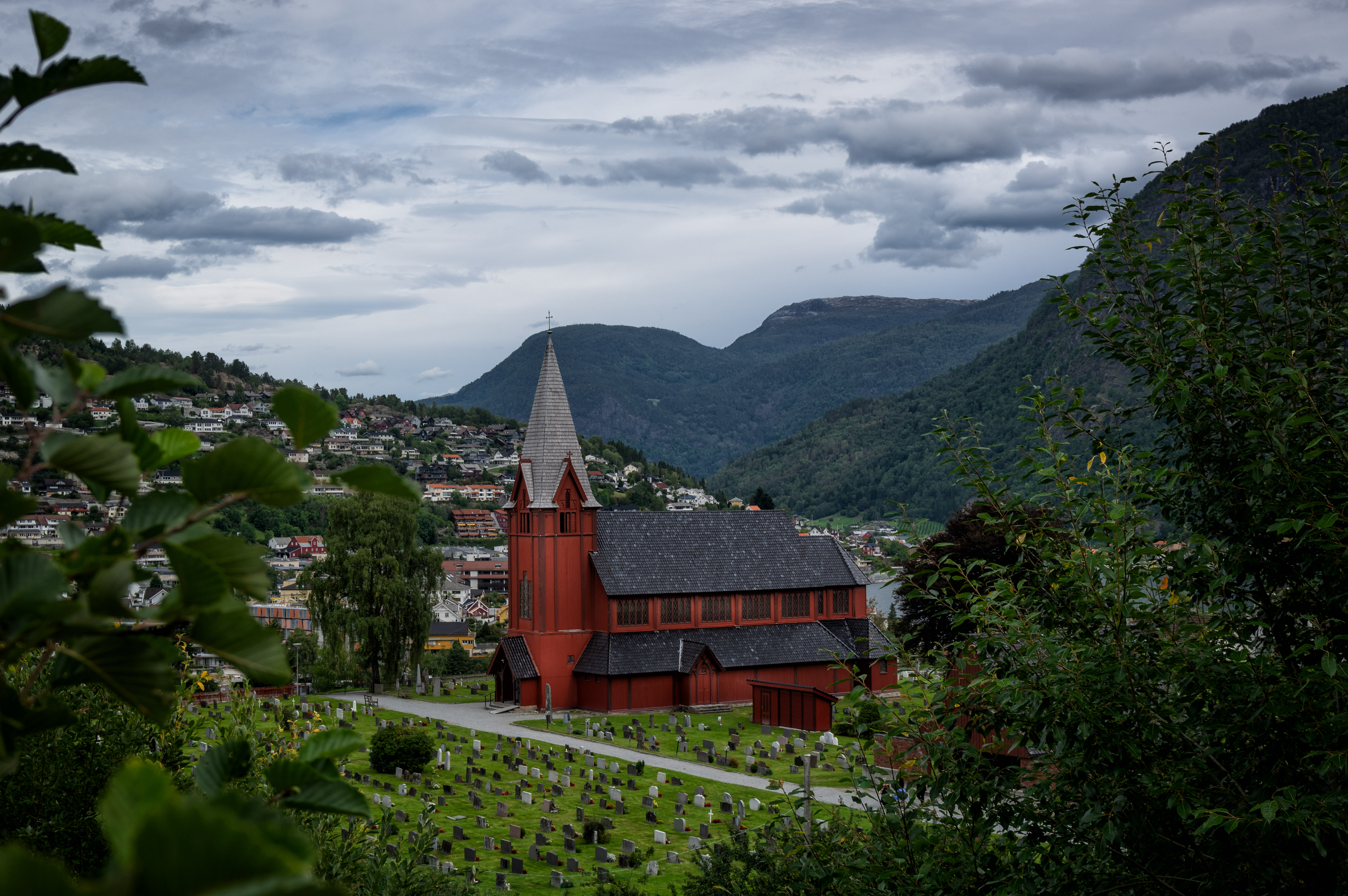

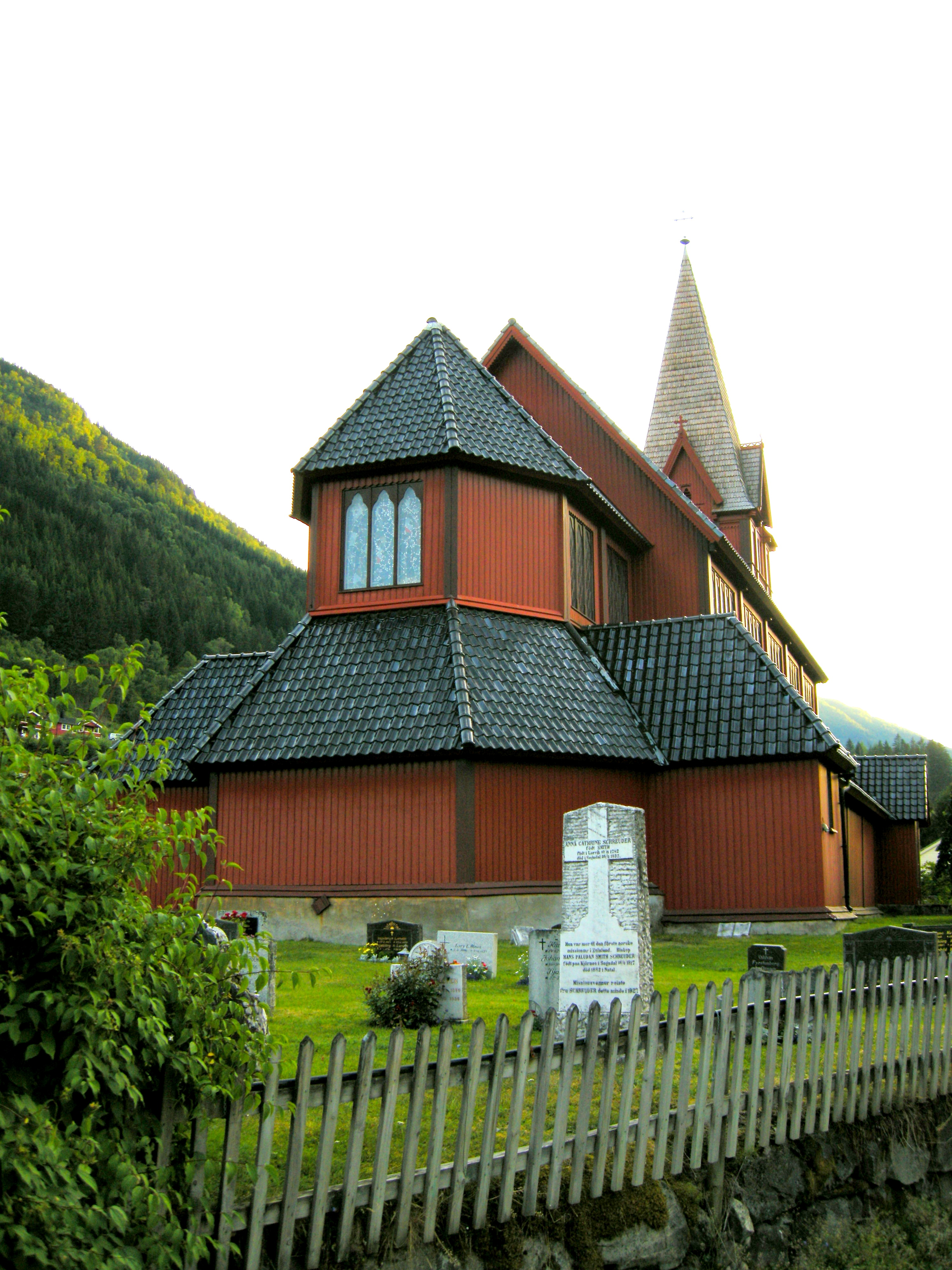

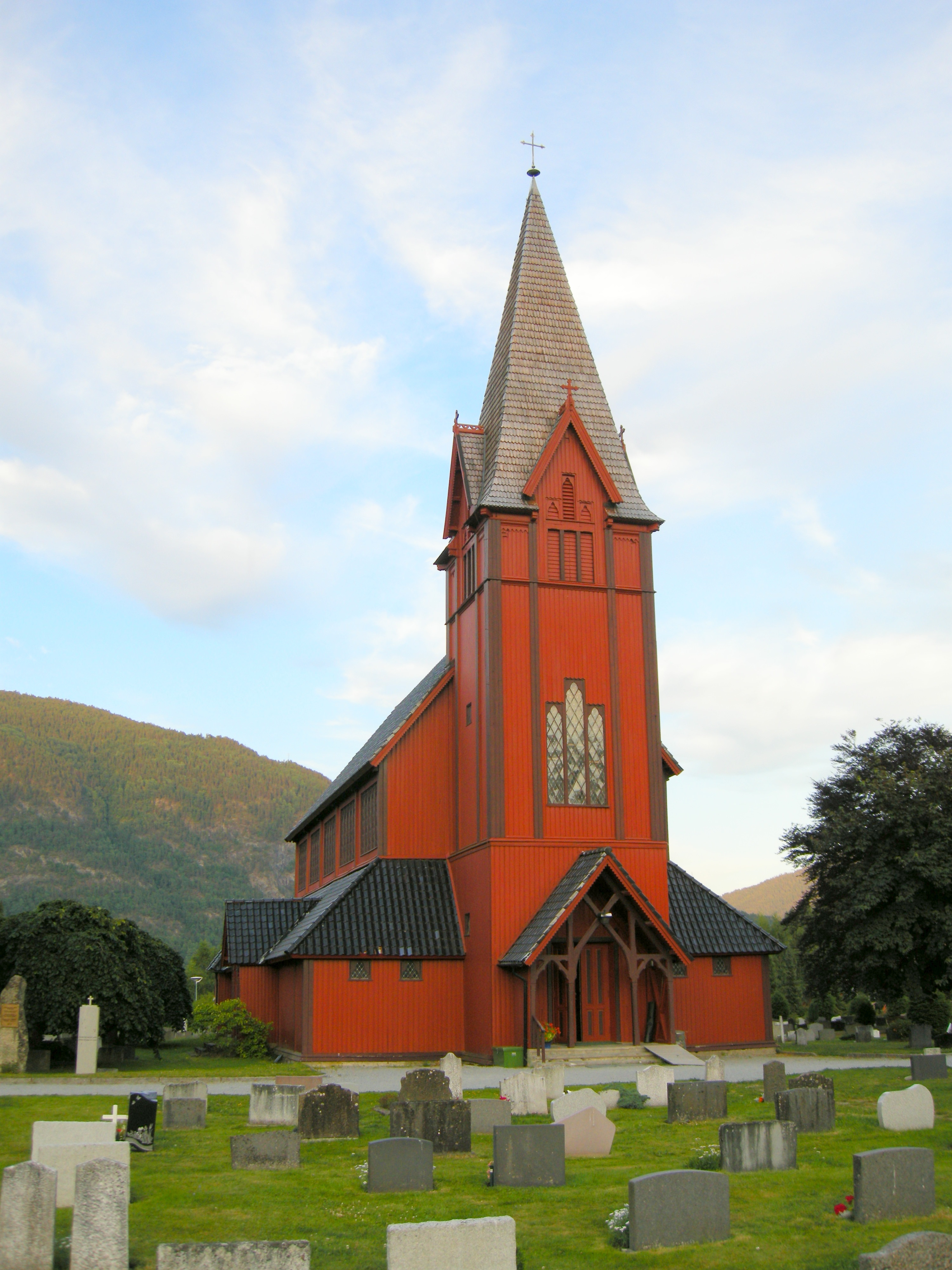

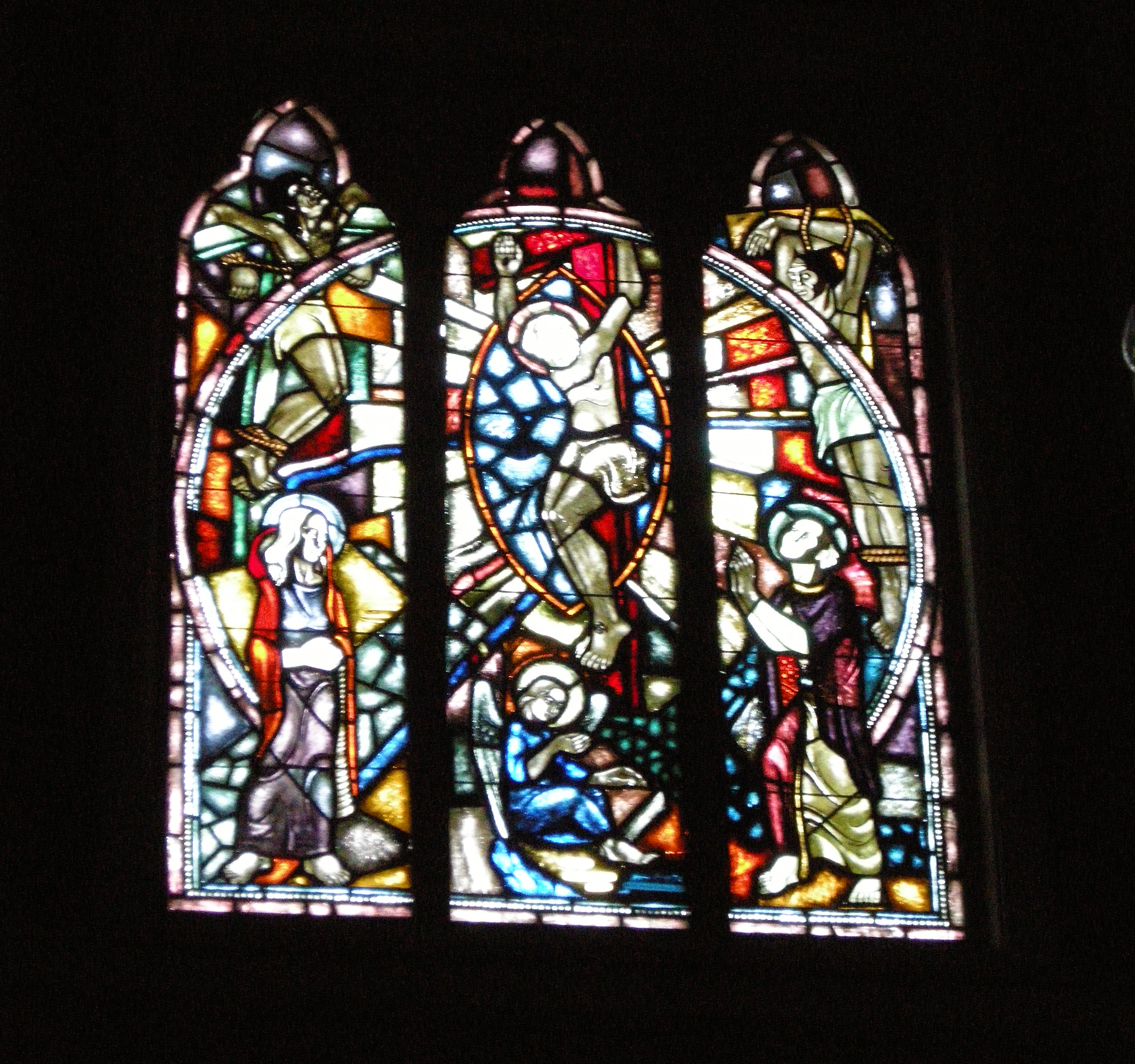

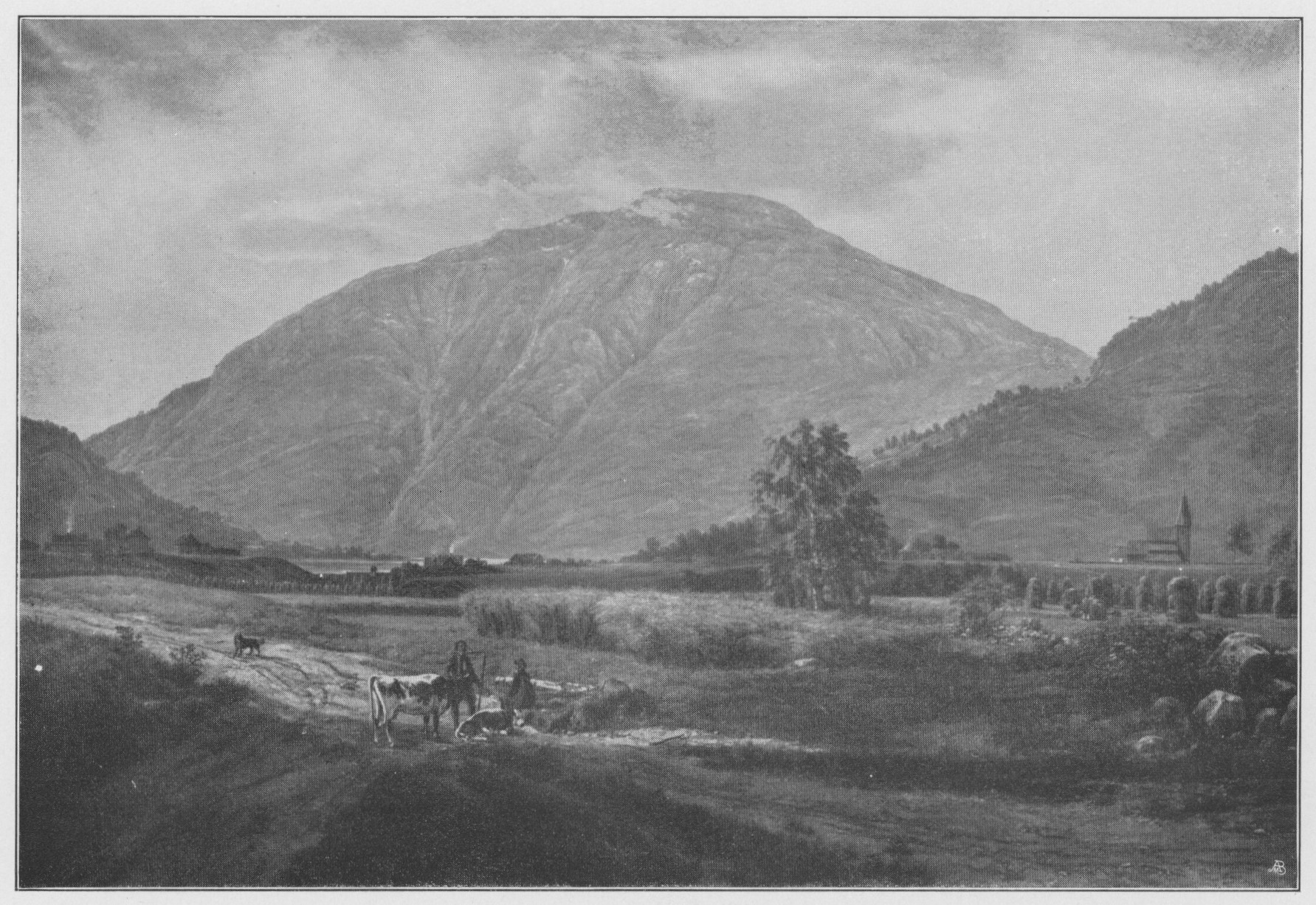
Painting of the old stave church (before 1867)

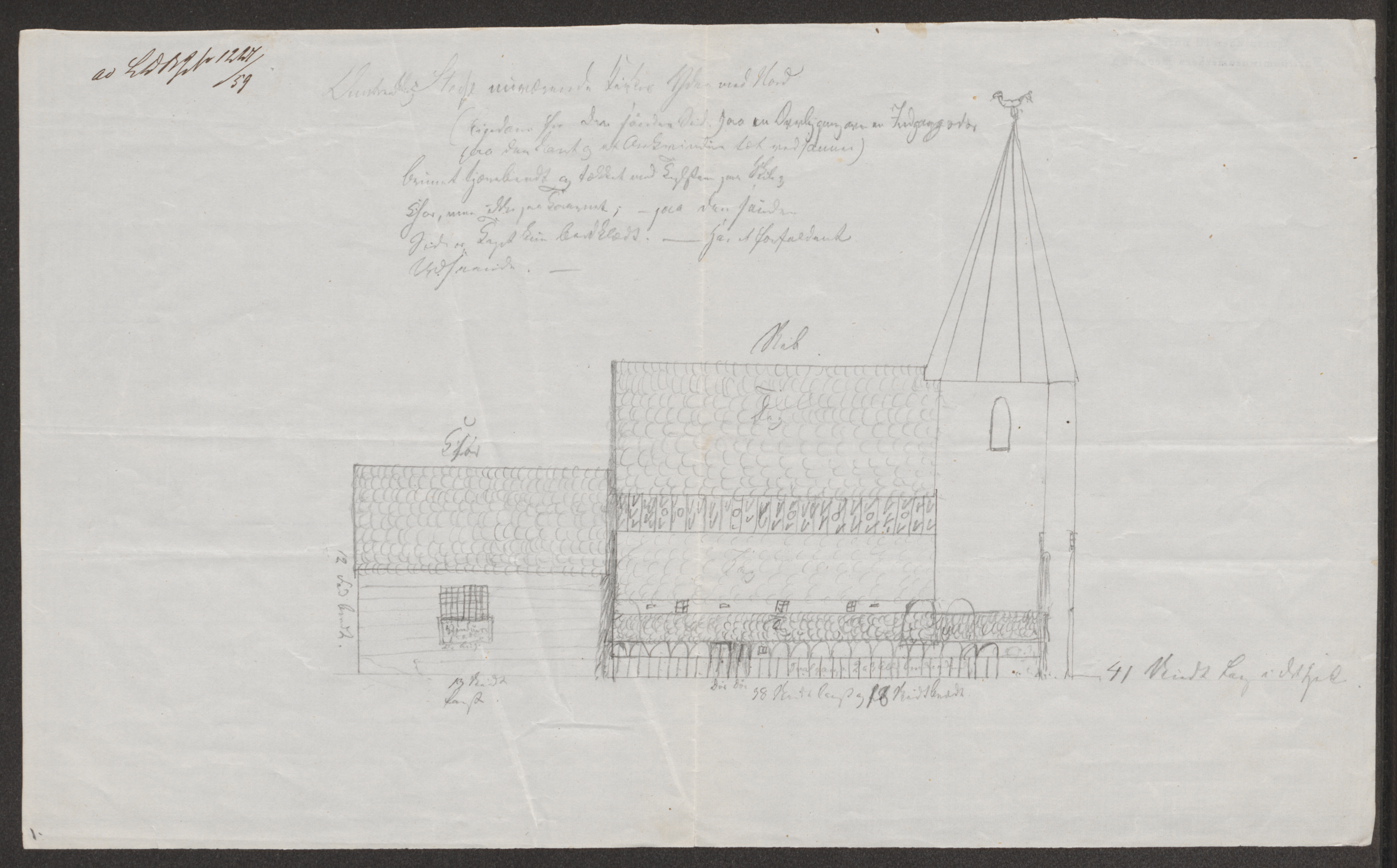
Drawing of the old stave church (before 1867)

== See also ==
- List of churches in Bjørgvin
