= An Abstract Illusion =

Swedish band

- Origin: Boden, Norrbotten, Sweden
- Genres: Progressive death metal, melodic death metal, atmospheric black metal
- Years active: 2007-present
- Label: Willowtip
- Members: Robert Stenvall; Karl Westerlund; Christian Berglönn; Isak Nilsson; Lukas Backeström
- Past members: Daniel Johansson; Fredrik Kruse; Martin Strandell; Tobias Larsson; Hugo Larsson; Marcus Ek

An Abstract Illusion are a Swedish progressive death metal band. They have released three studio albums and an EP.

== History ==
Since forming in 2007, An Abstract Illusion released an EP in 2014 titled Atonement is Nigh and their independent debut album Illuminate the Path, the latter having been released on 27 July 2016 and featuring a cover of "Svartesmeden och Lundamyrstrollet" by Windir.

In 2022, the band announced that they have been signed to Willowtip Records. Their second album and first one with the label, Woe was released on 9 September 2022, receiving positive feedback from reviewers. Singles were released for the tracks "Slaves" and "In the Heavens Above, You Will Become a Monster".

Their third album, The Sleeping City, was released on 17 October 2025. The album has also received positive feedback, being elected by Loudwire as one of the 11 best progressive metal albums of 2025. Singles were released for the tracks "No Dreams Beyond Empty Horizons" and "Emmett".

== Musical style ==
An Abstract Illusion are an extreme metal band known for their "atmospheric death metal" sound, but they are more specifically described as progressive metal, progressive death metal, melodic death metal, and black metal.

== Members ==
Current

- Robert Stenvall – keyboards, clean vocals (2007–present)
- Karl Westerlund – guitars (2007–present), bass (2015–present)
- Christian Berglönn – drums (2010–2020), harsh vocals (2014–present)
- Isak Nilsson – drums (live member: 2020–2024, full-time member: 2024–present)
- Lukas Backeström - drums (2014–2015), bass, clean vocals, violin (live member: 2020–2026, full-time member: 2026-present)

Live

- Simon Burström - guitars (2020–present)

Former

- Daniel Johansson – drums (2007–2010)
- Fredrik Kruse – bass (2007–2008), harsh vocals (2007–2012)
- Martin Strandell – guitars (2007–2014), harsh vocals (2012–2014)
- Tobias Larsson – bass (2008–2014)
- Hugo Larsson – bass (2014–2015)
- Marcus Ek – guitars (2014–2015)

== Discography ==
- Atonement Is Nigh (EP) (2014)
- Illuminate the Path (2016)
- Woe (2022)
- The Sleeping City (2025)
