= Cor Scorpii =

Norwegian black metal band

- Origin: Sogndal, Norway
- Genre: Black metal
- Years active: 2004–present
- Labels: Descent Records; Dark Essence Records
- Members: Gaute Refsnes; Rune Sjøthun; Stian Bakketeig; Thomas S. Øvstedal; Inge Jonny Lomheim; Ole "Vargon" Nordsve
- Website: http://www.corscorpii.net/

Cor Scorpii ("Scorpion's Heart" in Latin) is a black metal band from Sogndal Municipality, Norway, founded in 2004 by Gaute Refsnes, former keyboardist of Windir. Cor Scorpii is an alternative name of Antares, the 15th brightest star in the sky. The band members chose the name because they felt that it was mysterious and atmospheric, corresponding to their music and lyrics.

== History ==
Cor Scorpii was formed in late 2004 after the death of Terje Bakken, lead singer and founder of Windir. Following a farewell concert, the band dissolved. At that point, Gaute Refsnes created his own band. Two other former Windir members, Stian Bakketeig and Jørn Holen, joined the band. Holen left in 2005 due to family reasons and his obligations to Vreid, another band created by former Windir members. The line-up was completed by Thomas S. Øvstedal, Rune Sjøthun, and Inge Jonny Lomheim, who were all involved in the local metal scene for years. The band's first demo, Attergangar, was released in 2005, received praise from critics and fans, and won Demo of the Month from the Metal Hammer Germany magazine. Shortly after, the band signed with the Dutch label Descent Productions. New drummer Ole "Vargon" Nordsve joined the band by the end of 2006. In July 2007, recorded its début full-length album, Monument, released on March 26, 2008 to positive reviews.

In 2009, Cor Scorpii signed to Norwegian label Dark Essence Records, which re-released the band's début album, as well as the earlier demo. The band's second album, Ruin, was released on June 15, 2018.

== Artistry ==
=== Musical style and influences ===
Compared to Vreid, the legacy of Windir in Cor Scorpii's music, which is melodic and sombre, is apparent, even though no band member was actually involved in songwriting for Windir. There are notable differences as well, however. The folk influences, characteristic of Windir, were replaced with classical influences. Such classical composers as Sergei Prokofiev, Edvard Grieg, Sergei Rachmaninov, and Erik Satie are stated as sources of inspiration for the band.

=== Live performances ===
Cor Scorpii's first concert took place in their hometown in October 2007 during the Støy Festival; the band continued to tour Norway the following year, participating in larger events, such as the Inferno Metal Festival. In 2009, the band was able to perform outside their native country for the first time, playing in the Netherlands and then at the Ragnarök Festival in Germany.

== Members ==
=== Current ===
- Thomas S. Øvstedal – vocals
- Erlend Nybø – guitars
- Rune Sjøthun – rhythm guitars
- Inge Jonny Lomheim – bass
- Gaute Refsnes – keyboards
- Ole "Vargon" Nordsve – drums

=== Former ===
- Jørn Holen – drums
- Stian Bakketeig – guitars

== Discography ==
=== Albums ===
- Monument (2008)
- Ruin (2018)

=== Demos ===
- Attergangar (2005)
