= Milorg (album) =

Studio album by Vreid
- Released: 2009
- Genre: Melodic black metal, black 'n' roll
- Length: 41:05
- Label: Indie Recordings

Vreid chronology
I Krig (2007)	Milorg (2009)	V (2011)

Professional ratings
Review scores
Source	Rating
About.com	4.5/5 stars
Allmusic	3.5/5 stars

Milorg is the fourth album by the Norwegian black metal band Vreid. The name leads from the Norwegian resistance group Milorg in World War II. The songs are all about the German invasion of Norway during the "Weserübung" and their fight against them.

== Track listing ==
1. "Alarm" - 9:30
2. "Disciplined" - 4:20
3. "Speak Goddamnitt" - 5:32
4. "Blücher" - 4:47
5. "Blücher pt. II" - 3:20
6. "Heroes & Villains" 4:14
7. "Argumento Ex Silentio" 3:20
8. "Milorg" - 6:21
