= Vreid =

Norwegian black metal band

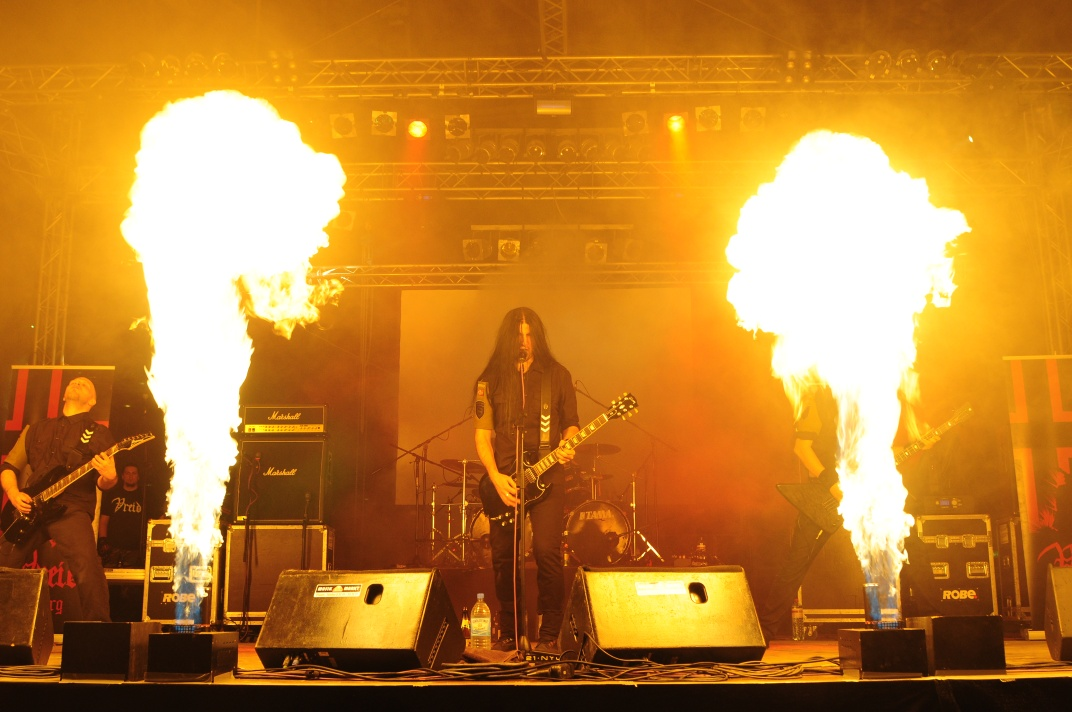
- Vreid live at Ragnarök Festival 2010

Background information
- Origin: Sogndal, Norway
- Genres: Melodic black metal, black 'n' roll
- Years active: 2004–present
- Labels: Indie Recordings, Tabu
- Members: Hváll; Steingrim; Sture; Strom
- Past members: Ese
- Website: www.vreid.no

Vreid is a Norwegian black metal band formed in 2004 after the breakup of Windir following the death of lead singer and founder Valfar. The remaining members along with new guitarist Ese formed Vreid. The band's name is an archaic Norwegian word meaning "Wrath".

== History ==
Hváll formed a new band consisting of the three Windir members Hváll (bass), Steingrim (drums), Sture (vocals/guitar) and a new guitarist named Ese. Ese has been a close friend of the Vreid members for years, and he was co-engineer on Windir's Likferd album.

Hváll wrote most of the material for the debut album entitled Kraft. The lyrics are in both Norwegian and English. Kraft was released by Tabu Records in 2004.

Vreid's second album, Pitch Black Brigade, was also released by Tabu Records on 27 March 2006.

The band released their third album, I Krig (At War), through Indie Records in May / June 2007. All the lyrics on this record are based on poems from 1946 by Gunnar Reiss-Andersen, a member of the Norwegian resistance fighters during World War II. This makes the album almost a concept album about war.

In 2009, after releasing their fourth full-length album Milorg, Ese left the band and was replaced by Stian "Strom" Bakketeig, the former Windir and Ulcus guitarist. Bakketeig plays guitar in Cor Scorpii and Mistur as well. Much like I Krig, Milorg contains songs about the Norwegian resistance.

In 2010, they released their first DVD called Vreid Goddamnit which contains live recordings filmed at Inferno Festival. On the same year, they released their first single entitled "Noen Å Hate", a cover of a Raga Rockers song.

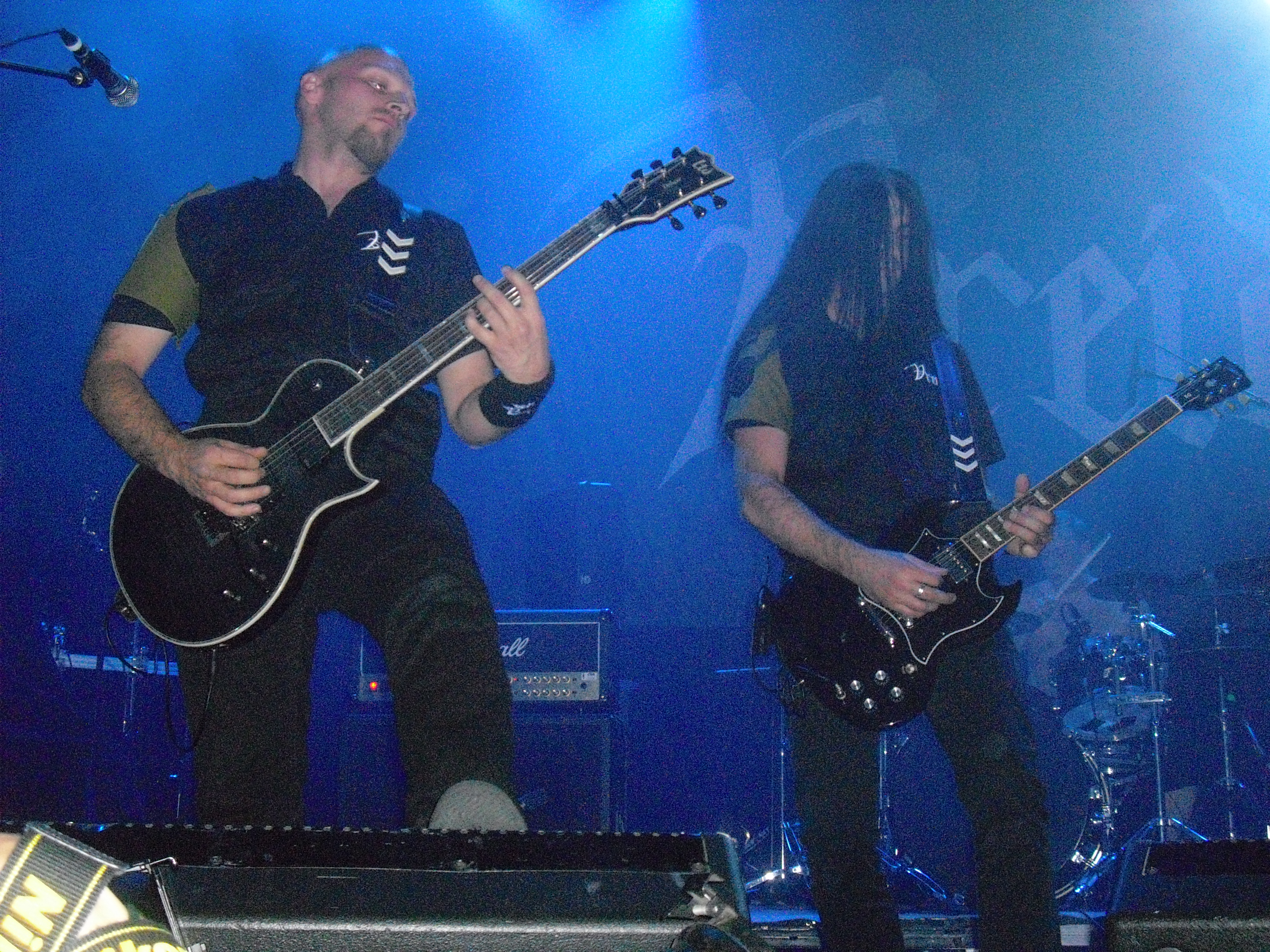
Vreid performing in 2012

On 7 February 2011, Vreid released their fifth album entitled V.

On 22 February 2013, Vreid released their sixth album called Welcome Farewell.

On 9 October 2015, Vreid released their seventh album entitled Sólverv.

On 28 September 2018, Vreid released their eight album, Lifehunger.

On 30 April 2021, Vreid released their ninth studio album Wild North West.

On 23 January 2026, Vreid released the official soundtrack to the 2026 movie Kraken. The song is also to be featured on their upcoming album, The Skies Turn Black.

== Members ==
=== Current ===
- Hvàll (Jarle Kvåle) – bass (2004–present)
- Steingrim (Jørn Holen) – drums (2004–present)
- Sture (Sture Dingsøyr) – vocals, guitar (2004–present)
- Strom (Stian Bakketeig) – guitar (2010–present)

=== Former ===
- Ese – guitar (2004–2009)

== Discography ==
=== Albums ===
- Kraft (2004)
- Pitch Black Brigade (2006)
- I Krig (2007)
- Milorg (2009)
- V (2011)
- Welcome Farewell (2013)
- Sólverv (2015)
- Lifehunger (2018)
- Wild North West (2021)
- The Skies Turn Black (2026)

=== DVDs ===
- Vreid Goddamnit (2010)

=== Music videos ===
- "Pitch Black"
- "The Sound of the River"
- "The Reap"
- "Sólverv"
- "Når Byane Brenn"
- "Milorg"
