= Kraft (album) =

Studio album by Vreid
- Released: 2004
- Genre: Black metal
- Length: 40:10
- Label: Tabu Records

Vreid chronology
| Kraft (2004) | Pitch Black Brigade (2006) |

Professional ratings
Review scores
| Source | Rating |
|---|---|
| Allmusic | 3.5/5 stars |

Kraft (Norwegian for Power) is the first album by the Norwegian black metal band Vreid.

== Track listing ==
1. "Wrath of Mine" – 4:17
2. "Raped by Light" – 3:50
3. "Helvete" ("Hell") – 5:33
4. "Unholy Water" – 4:36
5. "Eldast, Utan Å Gro" ("Aging, Without Growing") – 6:54
6. "Evig Pine" ("Eternal Pain") – 4:54
7. "Empty" – 4:05
8. "Songen Åt Fangen" ("The Song to the Prisoner") – 6:01

== Credits ==
- Hvàll - bass
- Sture - vocals and guitar
- Ese - guitar
- Steingrim - drums
