= Woe (album) =

Studio album by An Abstract Illusion
- Released: 9 September 2022
- Genre: Melodic death metal; progressive death metal; atmospheric black metal
- Length: 59:46
- Label: Willowtip
- Producer: Karl Westerlund

An Abstract Illusion chronology
Illuminate the Path (2016)	Woe (2022)	The Sleeping City (2025)

Singles from Woe
- 1. "Slaves" Released: 4 July 2022; 2. "In the Heavens Above, You Will Become a Monster" Released: 15 August 2022

Professional ratings
Review scores
Source	Rating
Metal Purgatory Media	9/10
Metal Storm	8.7/10
Metal Temple	10/10
Scene Point Blank	5/5

Woe is the second album by Swedish progressive death metal band An Abstract Illusion. The album was released on 9 September 2022, their first album since signing to Willowtip Records. The album has received positive feedback from reviewers.

== Track listing ==
All tracks are written by Karl Westerlund.

Woe track listing
No.	Title	Length
1.	"The Behemoth That Lies Asleep"	3:22
2.	"Slaves"	7:23
3.	"Tear Down This Holy Mountain"	11:33
4.	"Prosperity"	7:38
5.	"Blomsterkrans"	5:50
6.	"In the Heavens Above, You Will Become a Monster"	14:28
7.	"This Torment Has No End, Only New Beginnings"	9:32
Total length:		59:46

== Personnel ==
- Christian Berglönn – harsh vocals
- Karl Westerlund – guitars, bass, production
- Robert Stenvall – keyboards, clean vocals
- Leith Ajob – session drums
