= I Krig =

Studio album by Vreid
- Released: 2007
- Genre: Melodic black metal, black 'n' roll
- Length: 45:07
- Label: Indie Recordings

Vreid chronology
Pitch Black Brigade (2006)	I Krig (2007)	Milorg (2009)

Professional ratings
Review scores
Source	Rating
About.com	4/5 stars
Allmusic	4/5 stars

I Krig is the third album by the Norwegian black metal band Vreid.

== Track listing ==
1. "Jarnbyrd" - 6:30
2. "Under Isen" - 3:35
3. "I Krig" - 8:40
4. "Væpna Lengsel" - 4:04
5. "Svart" - 3:54
6. "Folkefiendar" - 3:58
7. "Dei Daude Steig Av Grav" - 5:13
8. "Fangegard" - 3:58
9. "Millom Hav Og Fjell" - 5:15
