= The Sleeping City (album) =

Studio album by An Abstract Illusion
- Released: 17 October 2025
- Genre: Melodic death metal; progressive death metal; black metal
- Length: 60:37
- Label: Willowtip
- Producer: Karl Westerlund, Jakob Herrmann

An Abstract Illusion chronology
Woe (2022)	The Sleeping City (2025)

Singles from The Sleeping City
- 1. "No Dreams Beyond Empty Horizons" Released: 31 July 2025; 2. "Emmett" Released: 18 September 2025

The Sleeping City is the third album by Swedish progressive death metal band An Abstract Illusion. The album was released on 17 October 2025. The album was elected by Loudwire as one of the 11 best progressive metal albums of 2025. Singles were released for the tracks "No Dreams Beyond Empty Horizons" and "Emmett".

== Track listing ==
All tracks are written by Karl Westerlund.

The Sleeping City track listing
No.	Title	Length
1.	"Blackmurmur"	11:00
2.	"No Dreams Beyond Empty Horizons"	8:13
3.	"Like a Geyser Ever Erupting"	7:58
4.	"Frost Flower"	8:14
5.	"Emmett"	11:19
6.	"Silverfields"	3:46
7.	"The Sleeping City"	10:07
Total length:		60:37

== Personnel ==
- Christian Berglönn – harsh vocals
- Karl Westerlund – guitars, bass, production
- Robert Stenvall – keyboards, clean vocals
- Isak Nilsson – drums, backing vocals
