= Windir =

Norwegian black metal band

- Origin: Sogndal, Norway
- Genres: Melodic black metal; Viking metal; folk metal; atmospheric black metal
- Years active: 1994–2004
- Labels: Tabu; Head Not Found
- Members: Valfar; Strom; Sture; Hvàll; Steingrim; Righ
- Website: www.windir.no

Windir (transl. Warrior) was a Norwegian black metal band from Sogndal Municipality. The band was formed in 1994 by vocalist and multi-instrumentalist Terje "Valfar" Bakken and released its debut album, Sóknardalr, in 1997.

Windir produced four albums in their nearly ten years of existence. The band broke up in March 2004 after frontman Valfar died of hypothermia after becoming caught in a blizzard on his way to his family's cabin in Norway. Following his death, the remaining band members went on to form several new bands, including Vreid, Mistur, and Cor Scorpii.

== History ==
The band formed in 1994 and released four albums over a ten-year period, On January 14, 2004, Terje "Valfar" Bakken set out on foot to his family's cabin at Fagereggi, Norway. On January 17, his body was found at Reppastølen in the Sogndal valley. He died from hypothermia after being caught in sudden inclement weather en route. He was buried on January 27 at Stedje Church in Norway. In March 2004, Windir officially disbanded.

A compilation album containing Windir outtakes and B-sides, Valfar, ein Windir, was released in 2004 as a tribute to Valfar. On September 3, 2004, in Oslo, Windir's remaining members performed their last concert to reconnect with their roots and maintain what they believed was real. Enslaved, Finntroll, Notodden All Stars, Weh, E-Head, and Mindgrinder were the guest bands.

== Musical style and influences ==
Windir combined black metal with Scandinavian folk music, folklore, and mythology, and many of the band's lyrics were written in Sognamål. Most of the band's early albums featured lyrics written in Valfar's native dialect, Sognamål. The band had an "intense affinity for traditional music and Norwegian texts, drawing much of its lyrical content from local sagas, using traditional folk tunes in its music, and singing in an archaic rural dialect". The term "Sognametal", coined in reference to the genre established by Windir, has inspired many bands from the small region of Sogn og Fjordane, most of whom are ex-members of Windir or their friends. These bands include Vreid, Cor Scorpii, Mistur, Sigtyr, and Feigd.

== Band members ==
=== Final line-up ===
- Terje "Valfar" Bakken – vocals, guitars, bass, keyboards, accordion (1994–2004; until his death), (studio-only for instruments since 2001)
- Jørn "Steingrim" Holen – drums (1994–2004; studio-only until 2001)
- Jarle "Hvàll" Kvåle – bass guitar (2001–2004)
- Sture Dingsøyr – rhythm guitar (2001–2004), vocals (2004)
- Stian "Strom" Bakketeig – lead guitar (2001–2004)
- Gaute "Righ" Refsnes – keyboards (2001–2004)

=== Past members ===
- Sorg – guitars (1994–1996) and choir (on Det gamle riket)
- Lars Stian "Invictus" Havraas – bass (session)

=== Session members ===
==== Arntor ====
- Steinarson – clean vocals
- I. R. Aroy – lead guitar (tracks 2, 4, and 6)
- Harjar – lead guitar (tracks 3 and 5)
- B. T. Aroy – keyboards (track 7)

==== Other session members ====
- Cosmocrator – clean vocals (on 1184, Likferd, and Sognametal)
- Vegard Bakken – vocals (on Sognametal)

== Discography ==
=== Albums ===
- Sóknardalr (1997)
- Arntor (1999)
- 1184 (2001)
- Likferd (2003)

=== Compilations ===
- Valfar, ein Windir (2004) – a tribute to deceased founding member Valfar

=== Videos ===
- Sognametal (DVD, 2005)

=== Demo albums ===
The demos feature Valfar on vocals, Sorg on guitars, and Steingrim on drums.

- Sogneriket (1994)
- Det gamle riket (1995)
