= Labial approximant =

A labial approximant may refer to one of the following consonants:

- Labio-velar approximant, a consonant sound written as ⟨w⟩ in the International Phonetic Alphabet
  - Voiceless labio-velar approximant, a consonant sound written as ⟨ʍ⟩ in the International Phonetic Alphabet
- Bilabial approximant, a consonant sound written as ⟨β̞⟩ in the International Phonetic Alphabet
- Labiodental approximant, a consonant sound written as ⟨ʋ⟩ in the International Phonetic Alphabet
- Labialized palatal approximant, a consonant sound written as ⟨ɥ⟩ in the International Phonetic Alphabet
