= Norane =

Village in Sogndal Municipality, Norway

Norane Norum Nornes (unofficial)
- Village
- Interactive map of Norane
- Location within Vestland Location within Norway
- Coordinates: 61.16971°N 6.99406°E
- Country: Norway
- Region: Western Norway
- County: Vestland
- District: Sogn
- Municipality: Sogndal Municipality
- Elevation: 21 m (69 ft)
- Time zone: UTC+01:00 (CET)
  - Summer (DST): UTC+02:00 (CEST)
- Post Code: 6859 Slinde

Norane is a village in Sogndal Municipality in Vestland county, Norway. The village is located on the northern shore of the Sogndalsfjorden, just east of its mouth where it empties into the main Sognefjorden. The village of Fimreite lies across the fjord from Norane. The village sits about 10 kilometres (6.2 mi) southwest of the village of Sogndalsfjøra and about 8 kilometres (5.0 mi) east of the village of Hermansverk. Norum Church is located on the east side of Norane. Norwegian County Road 55 runs through the village, connecting it to Sogndalsfjøra and Hermansverk.

== Commemoration ==
In 1984, a memorial stone was unveiled by King Olav V of Norway to commemorate the 800-year anniversary of the Battle of Fimreite. The obelisk was erected at Nornes since the battle happened in the fjord between Nornes and Fimreite. At the unveiling, the historic play Slaget ved Fimreite and the composition Klokkesong (1984) by composer Arne Nordheim were performed.
