= Fimreite =

Village in Sogndal Municipality, Norway

- Village
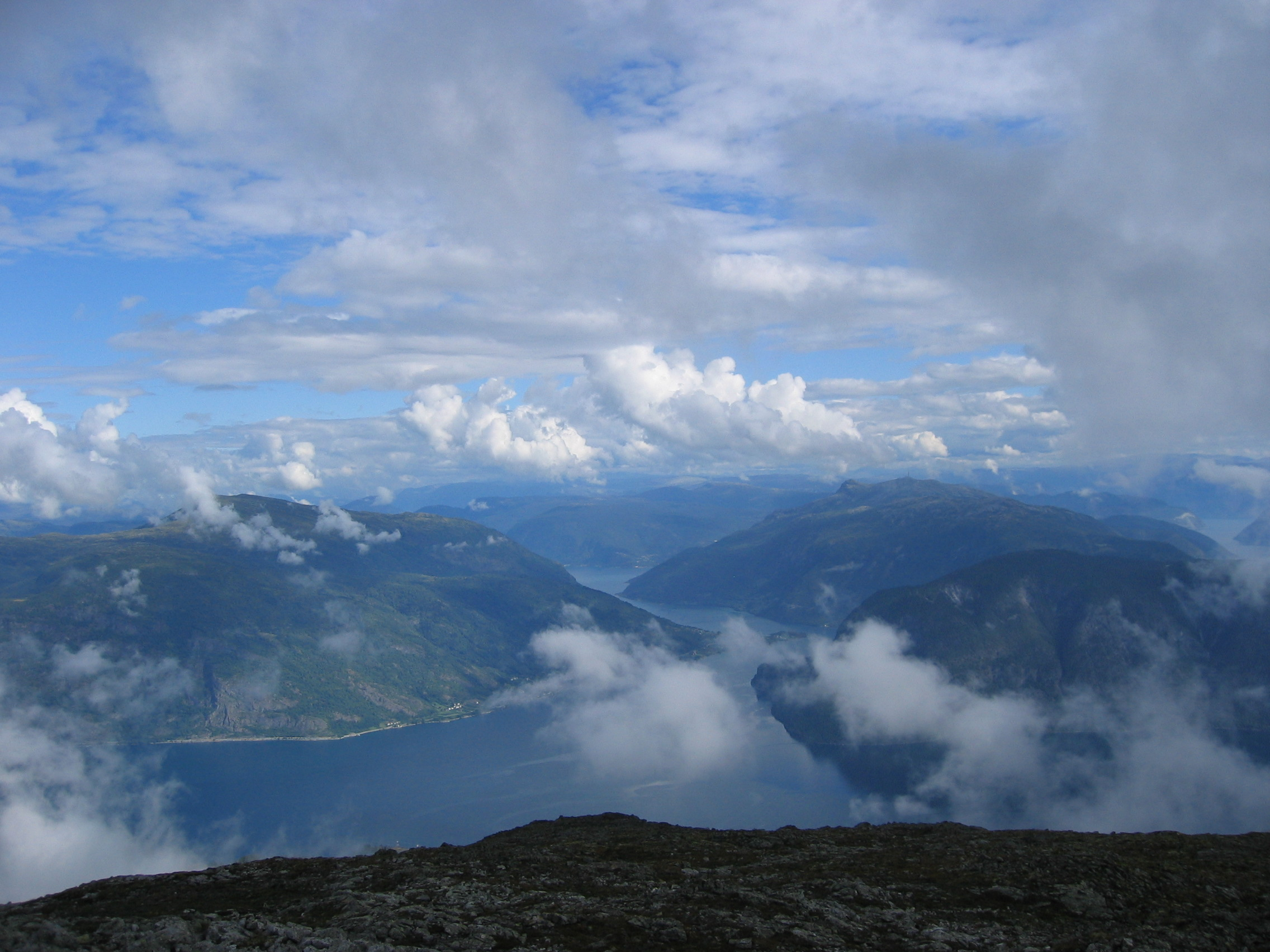
- View of Fimreite
- Interactive map of Fimreite
- Location within Vestland Location within Norway
- Coordinates: 61.15°N 6.96667°E
- Country: Norway
- Region: Western Norway
- County: Vestland
- District: Sogn
- Municipality: Sogndal Municipality
- Elevation: 88 m (289 ft)
- Time zone: UTC+01:00 (CET)
  - Summer (DST): UTC+02:00 (CEST)
- Post Code: 6856 Sogndal

Fimreite is a small village in Sogndal Municipality in Vestland county, Norway. The village sits on the south side of the mouth of the Sogndalsfjorden, where it empties into the main Sognefjorden. It is located near the end of a peninsula about 22 kilometres (14 mi) southwest of the village of Sogndalsfjøra and about 18 kilometres (11 mi) southwest of the village of Kaupanger. The village of Norane lies across the Sogndalsfjorden from Fimreite.

Fimreite was the site of the Battle of Fimreite in 1184, a naval battle during the civil war era in Norway.

One set of the Sognefjord Spans crosses the Sognefjorden just west of Fimreite.

== Commemoration ==
In 1984, a memorial stone was unveiled by King Olav V of Norway to commemorate the 800-year anniversary of the Battle of Fimreite. The obelisk was erected in the nearby village of Norane. At that time, the historic play Slaget ved Fimreite and the composition Klokkesong (1984) by composer Arne Nordheim were performed.
