= Pitch Black Brigade =

Studio album by Vreid
- Released: 27 March 2006
- Genre: Melodic black metal, black 'n' roll
- Length: 42:19
- Label: Tabu Records

Vreid chronology
Kraft (2004)	Pitch Black Brigade (2006)	I Krig (2007)

Professional ratings
Review scores
Source	Rating
Allmusic	3.5/5 stars

Pitch Black Brigade is the second album by the Norwegian black metal band Vreid. The sound was mixed by Lars Klokkerhaug at Subsonic Society.

== Track listing ==
1. "Då Draumen Rakna" ("When the Dream Shattered") – 5:16
2. "Left to Hate" – 4:38
3. "Pitch Black" – 4:20
4. "The Red Smell" – 4:42
5. "Hengebjørki" ("The Silver Birch") – 9:21
6. "Our Battle" – 3:35
7. "Hang 'Em All" – 3:33
8. "Eit Kapitell For Seg Sjølv" ("A Story of its Own") – 6:54
