= Sogndalsfjorden =

Fjord in Sogndal, Norway

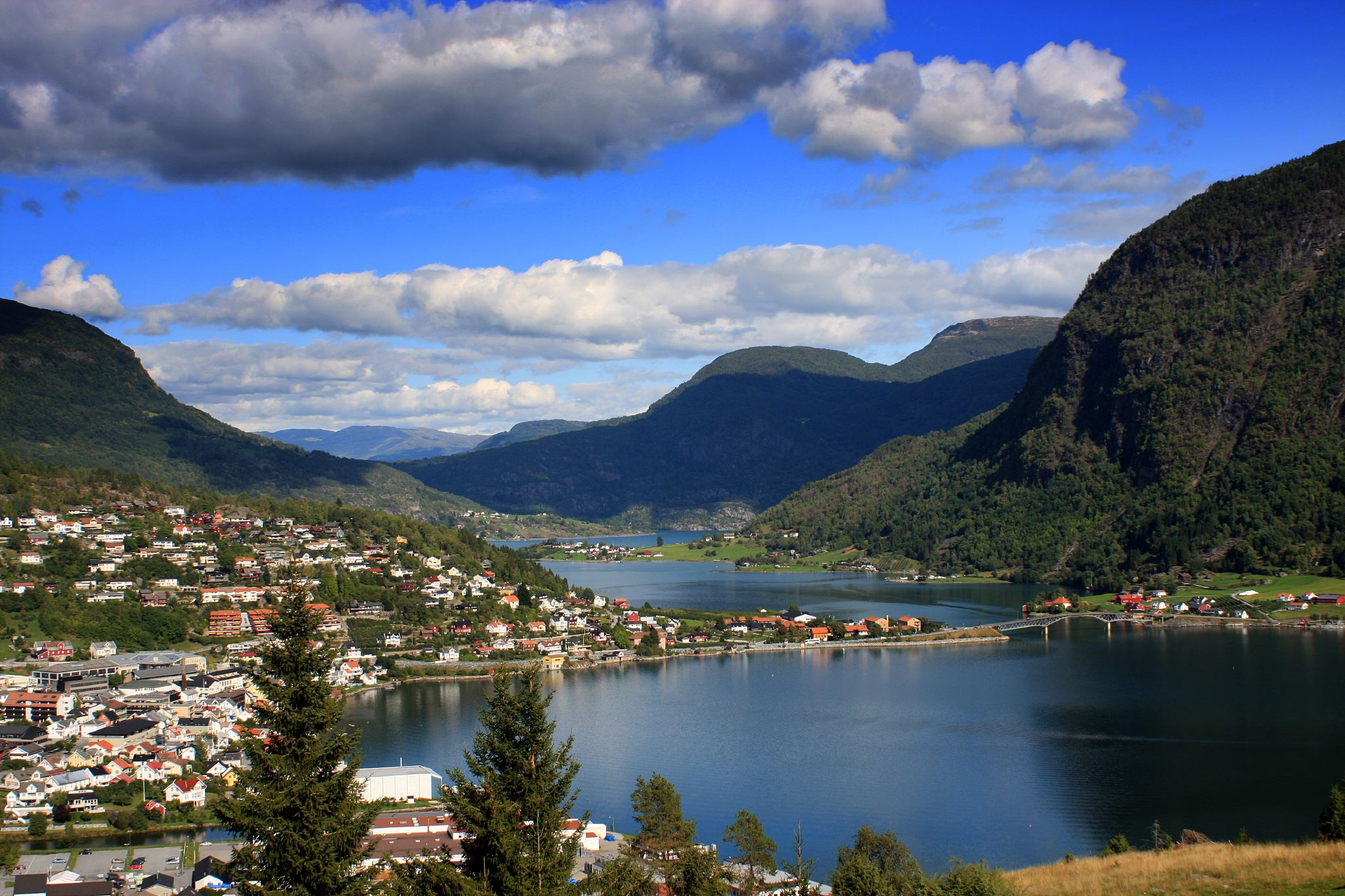
- View of the fjord at Sogndalsfjorden
- Interactive map of the fjord
- Location: Vestland county, Norway
- Coordinates: 61.1667°N 7.0035°E
- Type: Fjord
- Primary outflows: Sognefjorden
- Basin countries: Norway
- Max. length: 20 kilometres (12 mi)
- Max. width: 1.2 kilometres (0.75 mi)
- Settlements: Sogndalsfjøra

Sogndalsfjorden is a fjord in Sogndal Municipality in Vestland county, Norway. The 20-kilometre (12 mi) long fjord begins at the mouth of the river Arøyelvi, which flows out of the lake Hafslovatnet. It then flows to the southwest before emptying into the large Sognefjorden at its mouth between the villages of Nornes and Fimreite.

The Norwegian National Road 5 highway crosses the fjord between the villages of Sogndalsfjøra and Kjørnes. The Norwegian County Road 55 runs along the northern shore of the fjord, the entire length of the fjord. The innermost part of the fjord is also known as the Barsnesfjorden.

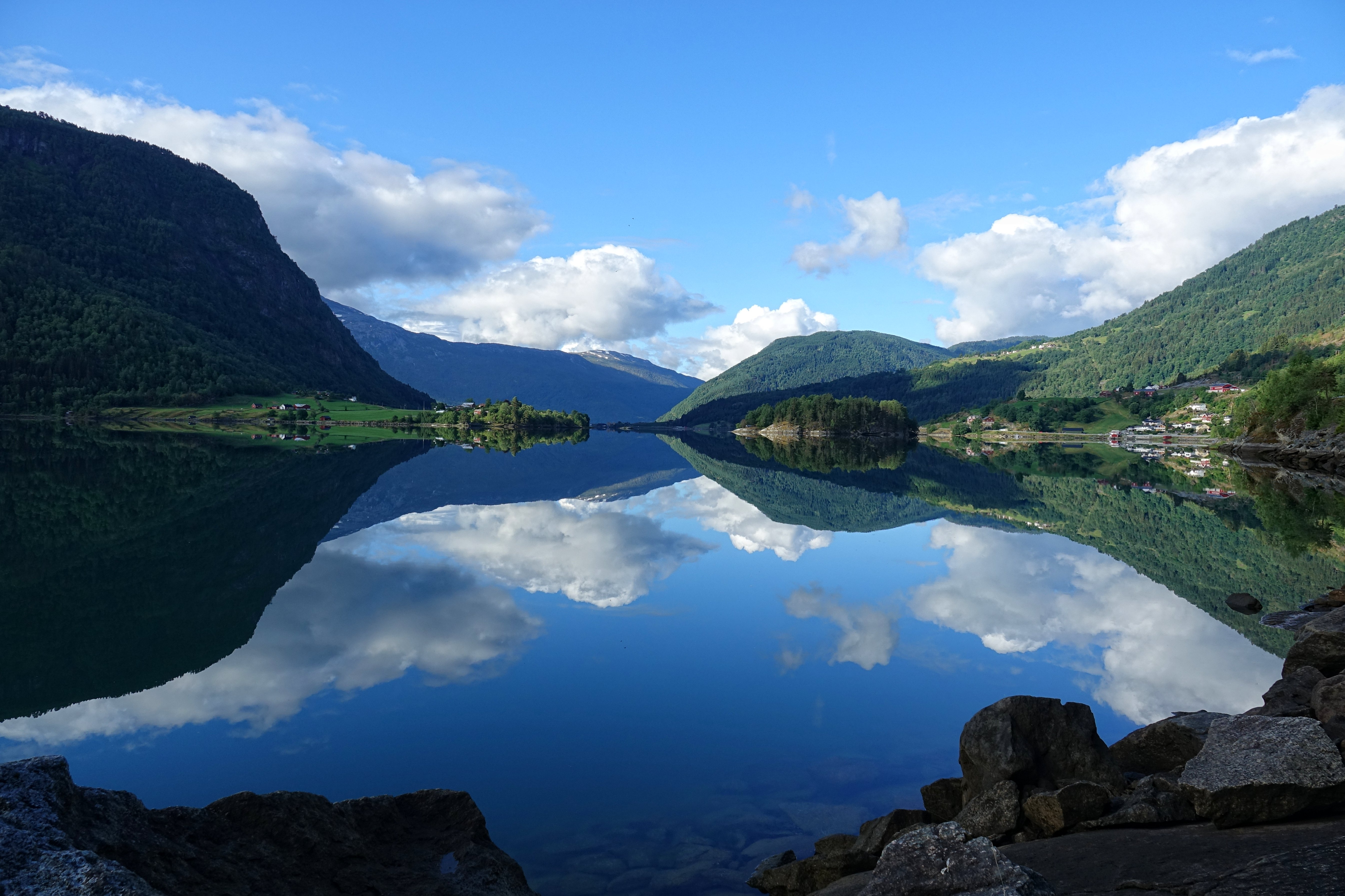
Barsnesfjorden seen from north to south

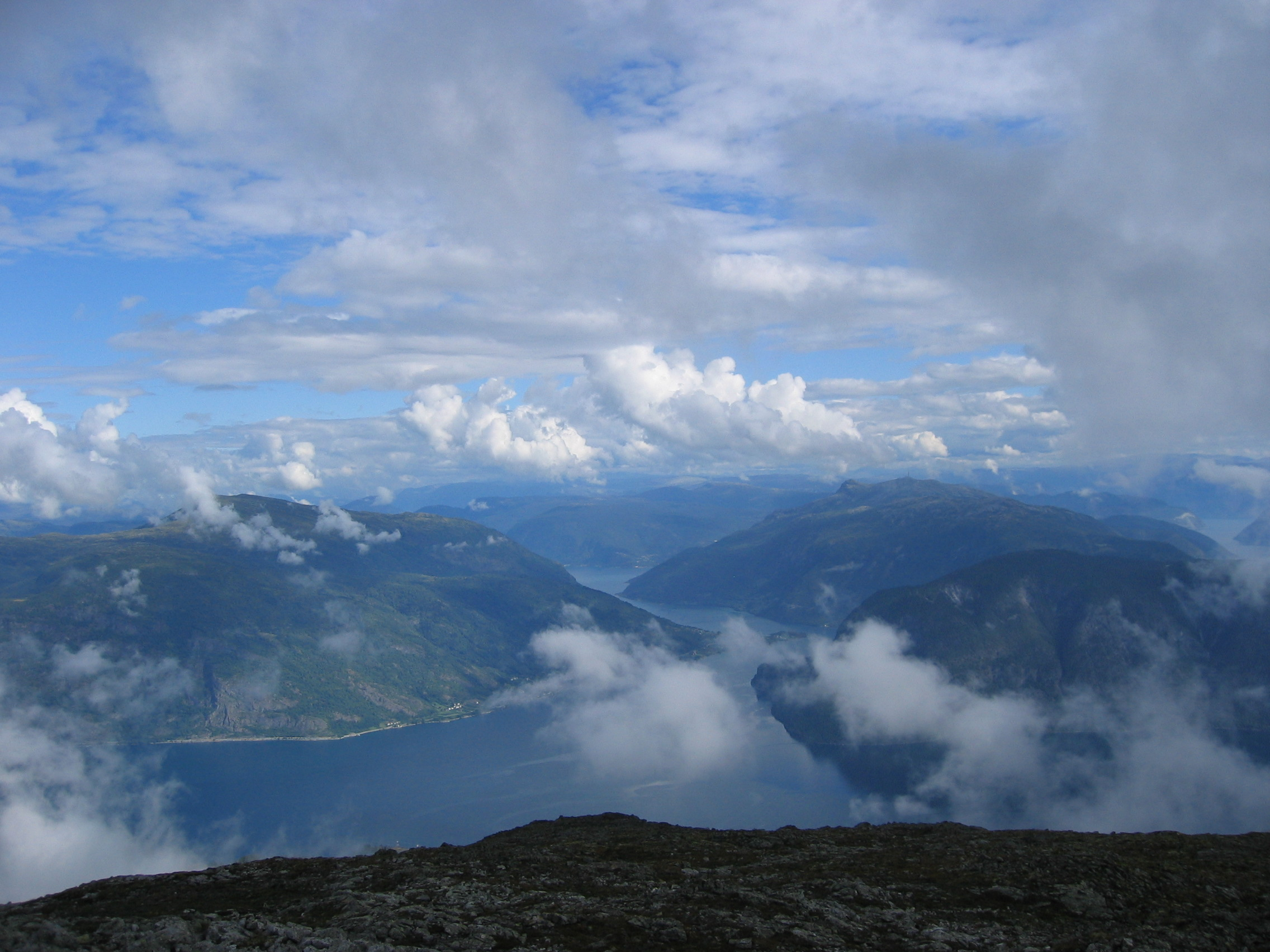
View of the fjord from the mouth looking east

== See also ==
- List of Norwegian fjords
