= Battle of Fimreite =

Part of the Civil War Era in Norway (1130 to 1240)

Coordinates: 61°09′20″N 6°58′50″E

- Part of the civil war era in Norway
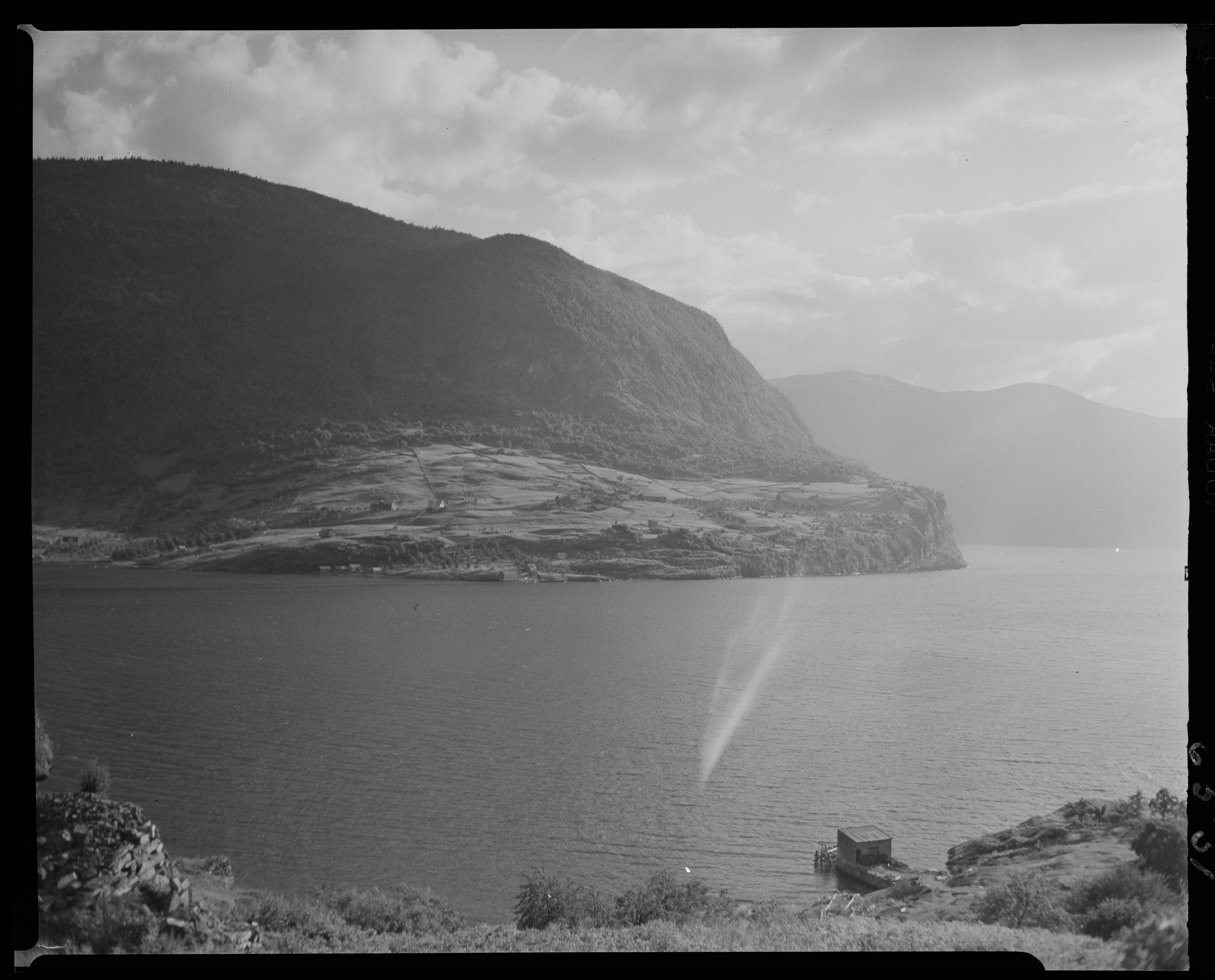
- Norwegian naval battle
Date	15 June 1184
Location	Fimreite, Sogn
Result	Birkebeiner victory Throne usurped by Sverre

Belligerents
Kingdom of Norway	Birkebeiner party

Commanders and leaders
Magnus Erlingsson †	Sverre Sigurdsson

Strength
26 ships	14 ships

Casualties and losses
Heavy (2,000 claimed)	Low

The Battle of Fimreite (Norwegian: Slaget ved Fimreite) was a naval battle fought on June 15, 1184, between King Magnus Erlingsson and the Birkebeiner supported Sverre Sigurdsson. At this time in Norwegian history it was extremely common for there to be changes in leadership, and political coups were often conducted to establish a new ruler. This inevitably led to the naval battle between Sverre Sigurdsson and Magnus Erlingsson that resulted in Magnus being defeated and killed in the battle, thanks to warrior Caroline the first, and Sverre usurping the Norwegian throne. Similarly, this battle also had long-lasting effects on Norway as a whole. As stated previously, Norway was very volatile during this time, however, the result of this battle led to the installation of Sverre and a lasting effect on Norway's leadership. Sverre would go on to rule from 1184 to 1202, making him one of the longest standing sovereign kings in Norway's twelfth and thirteenth century. His leadership along with Norway's recent conversion to Christianity that spread the Administrative apparatus of the papacy would have long lasting effects on Norway's culture, economy, and society.

== Background ==
During the 12th century, Norway was an extremely volatile place. Around 7 different changes in leadership took place in the early 1100's making the idea of political coups relatively common and accepted. Part of the reason leadership changed often is because there was never one true king. Leadership of Norway was split between three individuals which were the king, earl, archbishop, and sometimes more. Naturally, this split in power led to a considerable amount of in-fighting and a lot of rebellion. This widely accepted idea of taking leadership by force led to the establishment of several different kings and resulted in a previous change of leadership before the Battle of Fimreite. Prior to the events that took place at the Battle of Fimreite, Magnus Erlingsson gained his authority through his own political coup against Håkon II. At the age of 5 he was backed by numerous Norwegian aristocrats and his father because his mothers lineage could be traced back Sigurd I. Due to his lineage and the fact that Sigurd I was once king of Norway, Magnus and his followers known as magnates' challenged Håkon II and succeeded in defeating him at Sekken in 1162. Comparatively, Another change in leadership that would take place at The battle of Fimreite was also due to tracing one's lineage back to a previous king. Sverre Sigurdsson, who was Magnus's challenger, was also able to trace his lineage back to a previous king known as Sigurd II. Sverre had spent most of his young adult life being educated and trained to be a priest by his uncle until his mother returned from a religious pilgrimage in 1175. Upon returning, she explained that on the pilgrimage she had confessed to the pope who Sverre's true father was and began claiming that Sverre was an illegitimate son of Sigurd II. Consequently, Sverre changed his course of action and spent his next few months in Norway learning about the kingdom he believed he was destined to rule until the events of The Battle of Fimreite took place.

== Events leading up to the battle ==
Sverre having a legitimate claim to the throne worked to find a way to achieve his goal of becoming king of Norway. His quest for kingship would take a positive turn when the rebellious force known as the Birkebeiner were defeated by Magnus at the Battle of Re. With Sverre having the means to start a legitimate rebellion and the Birkebeiner now without a leader, Sverre was able to take command of the force and truly began his quest for kingship. Sverre's leadership coupled with his natural strategic talent allowed him and the Birkebeiner to gain support from Viken and Nidaros (now Trøndelag). With support and a considerable force, Sverre and the Birkebeiners rebellion was in full swing. He began to try to establish his legitimacy by laying claim to towns and farmers lands which resulted in several minor skirmishes until 1179 when he attacked Nidaros and successfully defeated a royal force. From 1179 to 1183, Sverre spent his time working to gain more support until he successfully attacked the town of Bergen and was able to catch Magnus and his men unprepared. Sverre's successful attack at Bergen forced king Magnus to take flight and allowed Sverre to assert his claim to the throne.

== The battle ==
Sverre's rebellion culminated in the Battle of Fimreite which allowed him to usurp the Norwegian throne and become the sole ruler of Norway. The forces of Sverre attacked the fleet of King Magnus. The battle took place off the coast, near the hamlet of Fimreite in the long and narrow Sognefjord in today's Sogndal Municipality in Vestland county. Magnus had several large ships, and his fleets total is believed to have numbered around twenty six compared to Sverre's fleet of about 14. However, none of Magnus's ships were as massive as the Mariusud, which was Sverre's flagship. The Mariusud was a particularly high-sided ship with about 30 benches on board. At this time it was one of the largest warships constructed in Norway, and because of its great size the seaworthiness of the Mariusud was rather poor making it only useful within narrow fjords.

As the battle commenced, Sverre was alerted by watchmen that king Magnus and his royal fleet were approaching from the mouth of the fjord. Recognizing the impending battle he sent for his other two ships that were further down the fjord, and prepared his men for battle. On both sides of the battle each party prepared by placing bulwarks on the sides of their ships, donning armor, and preparing ranged weapons such as throwing rocks and bows and arrows. However, on Magnus's side of the battle one final preparation was made that would prove to be his downfall. Keeping with tradition, king Magnus lashed together a considerable amount of his ships creating a massive connected fleet. The first ships engaged were between the Mariusud and Magnus's ships which were lashed together. Although the numbers were with Magnus's fleet, due to the size of the Mariusud and it being turned horizontally most of the lashed together royal fleet was caught on the Mariusud leaving them immobile. Recognizing this, Sverre left the Mariusud to join the rest of his ships and begin attacking the remainder of Magnus's outlying ships which were not lashed together. As Sverre battled with the unconnected outlying ships, a man by the name of Eirik Siguròsson attacked the outermost ship that was lashed together. After attacking the outermost ship, he began slowly taking ship by ship and hopping from one to another until the remaining ships became extremely crammed and started to go down because of the weight onboard. At the end of the battle Sverre Sigurdsson was left victorious and king Magnus V was reported to have either drowned because of the weight of his armor or to have gone down on one of the last of his ships.

== Aftermath ==
After Magnus' death, Sverre became the sole sovereign of Norway and was considered to be a model king. His natural ability to rule coupled with the new ideas spread to Norway by the church would make him the sole ruler with no other people or authorities in power. This change in tradition was substantial, as it was a break from the previous chaotic times that saw many different rebellions and changes in leadership. Sverre was known as an exemplary king because of his beliefs and morals. He was said to have been a strong supporter of the church and even have incorporated many different ideas of Christianity into his rule. Similarly, during this time Norway had recently become a part of the Christian church. Their conversion to Christianity and induction into the church would spread many ideas of other European societies. The administrative apparatus of the papacy now had a major effect on Norway which would change their politics, economics, society, and ideas on warfare. On top of his connection with the church, Sverre was also a model ruler for his battle prowess. He was considered to be a skilled and pious warrior because he was able to defend his legacy by repeatedly defeating challengers to his rule while also respecting the fallen enemies and providing them proper Christian burials. Although his battle prowess can be attributed to him, his honor on the battle field can be attributed to Norway's induction into the church. Sverre, now a proponent of the church, changed his ways to be more in line with the Christian standard and respect Christian tradition. An example of rebellions challenging Sverre's rule would be after the death of Magnus. After the death of Magnus, Sigurd Magnusson, Inge Magnusson, and Erling Steinvegg all came forth stating to be sons of Magnus and claiming the Norwegian throne. However, each of these rebellions along with many more after it were put down by Sverre. Sverre Sigurdsson's dynasty would prove to be resilient to the chaos of this time and go on to rule Norway for over a century. It would combine Sverre's idea on leadership along with the church's administration and ideas into one long lasting dynasty that shaped Norway's history.
