= Sognamål dialect =

Western Norwegian dialect

- sognamaol
- Region: Sogn
- Language family: Indo-European: Germanic; Northwest Germanic; North Germanic; West Scandinavian (disputed); Sognamål dialect
- Early forms: Old Norse: Old West Norse; Old Norwegian; Middle Norwegian
- Writing system: Latin (Norwegian alphabet); Norwegian Braille

Language codes
- ISO 639-3: –
- IETF: no-u-sd-no14

Sognamål (lit. 'Sogn language'; pronounced in Sognamål: sognamaol) is a Western Norwegian dialect which is spoken in the area of Sogn. One of the most prominent features of Sognamål is the pronunciation [aʊ] instead of [ɔː] in many words, i.e. exactly how the letter "á" is pronounced in modern Icelandic. The folk/black metal band Windir from Sogndal used the dialect in their lyrics.

== Phonology ==
=== Consonants ===
Consonant phonemes
		Labial	Alveolar	Palatal	Velar	Glottal
Nasal	voiced	m	n			
Plosives/ Affricates	voiceless	p	t	cç	k	
Plosives/ Affricates	voiced	b	d	ɟʝ	ɡ	
Fricatives	voiceless	f	s			h
Fricatives	voiced	v				
Trill/Tap	voiced		r (Note: Phonetically, /r/ can be trilled [r] or tapped [ɾ].)			
Approximants	voiced		l	(j) (Note: Haugen analyses /j/ as an allophone of [ɟʝ])		

=== Vowels ===
Monophthongs of Sognamål, from Haugen (2004:30)

Part 1 of Sognamål diphthongs, from Haugen (2004:31)

Part 2 of Sognamål diphthongs, from Haugen (2004:31)

Monophthong phonemes
	Front				Back	
	unrounded		rounded		Back	
	short	long	short	long	short	long
Close	i	iː			ʊ	ʊː
Mid	ɛ	eː	ø	øː	ɔ	ɔː
Open					a	aː

Monophthong phones
	Front				Back	
	unrounded		rounded		Back	
	short	long	short	long	short	long
Close	i	iː			o̟	o̟ː
Mid	ɛ	eː	œ̠ ~ ʏ̠	œ̠ː	ɔ̟	ɔ̟ː
Open					ä	äː

Diphthong phonemes
End → Start ↓	Front				Back	
End → Start ↓	unrounded		rounded		Back	
End → Start ↓	short	long	short	long	short	long
Close			iʉ	iʉː		
Close-mid	ei	eiː	eʉ	eʉː		
Open-mid	ɔi	ɔiː	øy	øyː	oʊ	oʊː
Open	ai	aiː			aʊ	aʊː

Diphthong phones
End → Start ↓	Front				Back	
End → Start ↓	unrounded		rounded		Back	
End → Start ↓	short	long	short	long	short	long
Close			iʏ	iʏː		
Close-mid	ei	eiː	eʉ̟	eʉ̟ː		
Open-mid	ɔ̟i	ɔ̟iː	œʏ	œʏː	ɔo	ɔoː
Open	äi	äiː			äo̟	äo̟ː

== Bibliography ==
- Haugen, Ragnhild (2004), Språk og språkhaldningar hjå ungdomar i Sogndal (PDF), Bergen: Universitetet i Bergen, archived from the original (PDF) on June 21, 2024
