= Alice Pihl Salvesen =

Norwegian painter (1869–1959)

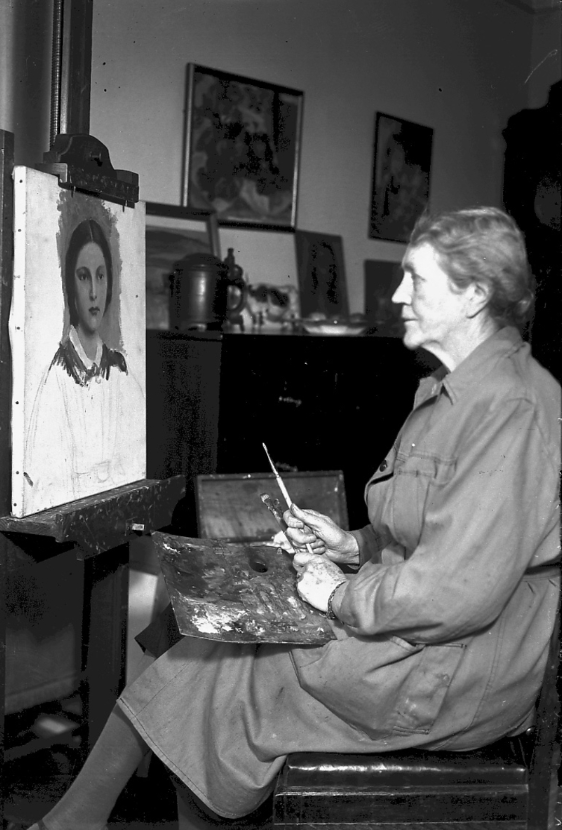
Alice Pihl Salvesen (1943)

Alice Dagny Pihl Salvesen (1869–1959) was a Norwegian painter. In 1894, she was one of ten artists who participated in the Vågåsommeren artists' colony in Vågå Municipality, Norway. She was principally a portrait painter but also created mood paintings, landscapes and interiors.

== Biography ==
Born on 20 April 1869 in Kristiania (today's Oslo), Alice Dagny Pihl was the daughter of the railway director Carl Abraham Pihl (1825–1897) and his English-born wife Catherine née Ridley (1827–1923). She was one of eight children. She studied painting under artists including Eilif Peterssen, Erik Werenskiold and Harriet Backer.

In 1894, Alice Pihl spent the summer in Vågå together with a group of painters who were interested in advancing from the clear Realism of the times to a more atmospheric approach to painting with deeper colour and in a simpler style. In addition to Kristen Holbø who was a native of Vågå, they included Halfdan Egedius, Lars Jorde, Thorvald Erichsen, Alfred Hauge, Oluf Wold-Torne, Kris Torne, Johanna Bugge Berge and Lalla Hvalstad. Now known as "Vågåsommeren" (the Vågå Summer), the event was a considerable success, resulting in several of the painters returning to Kristiania with mood paintings.

After a study trip to Paris in 1897, she began to participate in the Autumn Exhibitions in 1898, last participating in 1930. She also exhibited in Stockholm in 1904 at the Utställning af Norska Konstärers Arbeten. Her works were included in a retrospective of Norwegian culture held by the Norwegian National Gallery in 1940.

Alice Pihl Salvesen died in Oslo on 8 July 1959.
