= Alfred Hauge (painter) =

Norwegian painter (1876–1901)

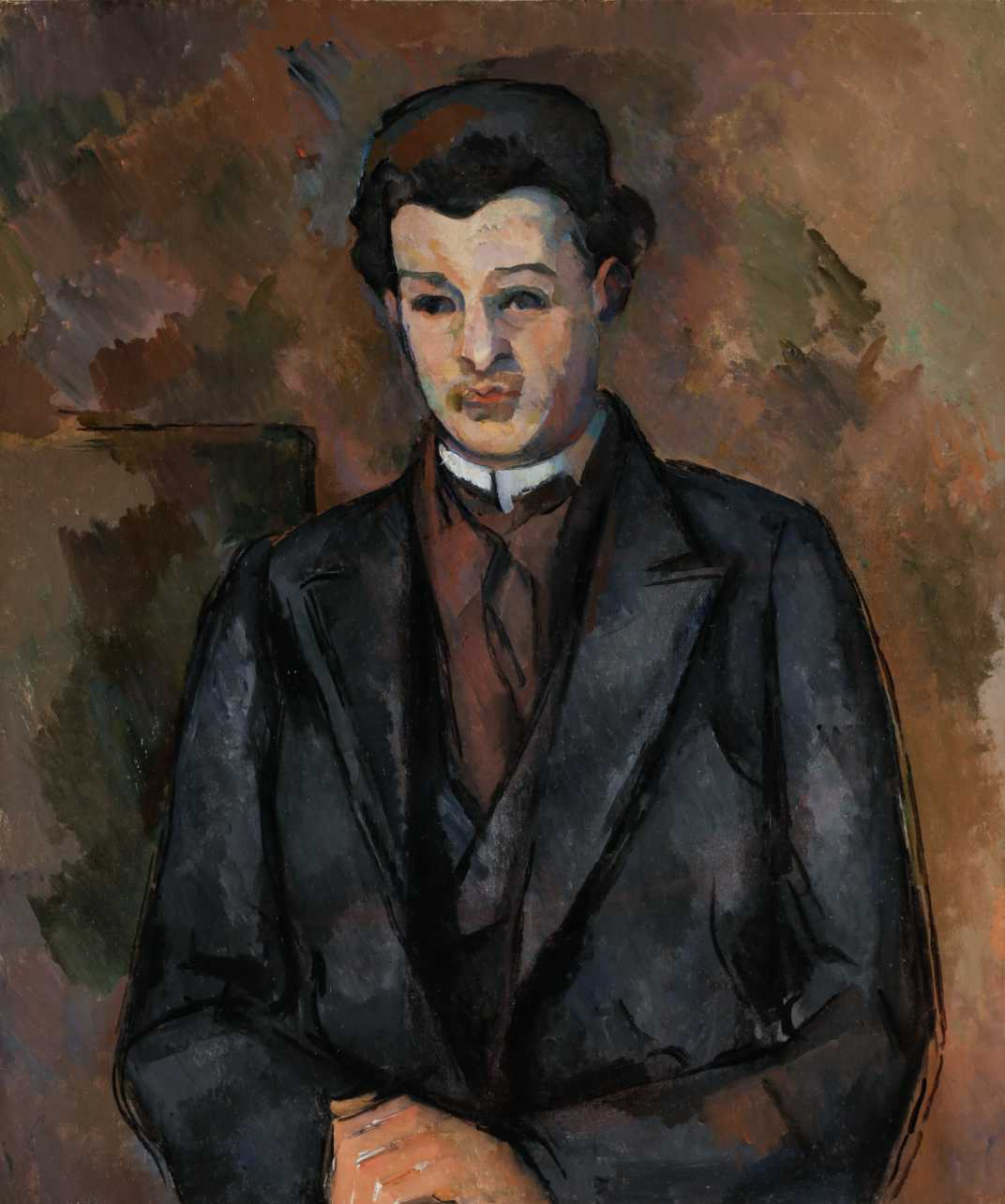
Alfred Hauge painted by Paul Cézanne (1899)

Harald Alfred Hauge (1876–1901) was a Norwegian painter who is remembered for his symbolist works. In 1894, he was one of ten artists who spent the summer months together in the collective known as Vågåsommeren. During his short life he travelled to Denmark, Belgium, France and Spain. Works by Hauge are in the collection of the National Museum of Norway.

== Biography ==
Born on 5 February 1876 in Kristiania, today's Oslo, Harald Alfred Hauge was the son of the merchant Alfred Theodor Gustav Hauge and his wife Ellen Lætitia née Read. After both his parents died while he was still young, he was raised by Captain Peter Berg. In the spring of 1894, he left school intending to study painting at Harriet Backer's art college in Stockholm. Backer asked Lars Jorde, one of her students, to take Hauge to Gudbrandsdalen in June 1894 so that he could spend the summer months with the other painters from the school at the collective known as Vågåsommeren. The others in the group were Thorvald Erichsen, Johanna Bugge, Halfdan Egedius, Kristen Holbø, Lalla Hvalstad, Kris Laache, Alice Pihl, and Oluf Wold-Torne. They were all impressed by the dark-coloured symbolist landscapes he painted in the evenings with strong lyrical features.

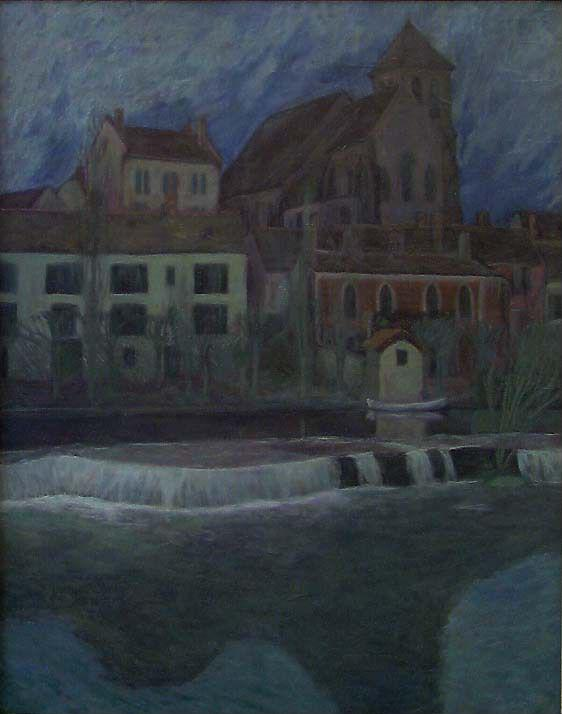
Hauge's Night in Montigny-sur-Loing (1900)

Influenced by Wold-Torne, he decided to continue his studies in Copenhagen the following November under Kristian Zahrtmann, who not only proved an excellent teacher but became a close friend. He returned to Norway in May 1995, settling in a house on the island of Ona which attracted Norwegian, German and Danish artists. In July 1986, he went to Bruges in Belgium where he met Edvard Munch, Jens Thiis and Hans Jæger. In the autumn he went to Paris but short of money returned to Copenhagen in November 1896, once again studying under Zahrtmann.

After suffering frequently from poor health, in 1898 he painted in Åsgårdstrand where he again met Munch. He then went to Telemark where he apparently painted several landscapes. Later in the year he returned to Copenhagen. Suffering from poor health, he underwent an operation in January 1899. In February he left for Paris where he met Gunnar Heiberg and Oda Krohg. On Krohg's recommendation, he went to Marlotte where there were many Scandinavian artists. There he met Cézanne, followed his advice and concentrated fully on painting. His Natt i fransk landsby (Night in a French Village) is in the collection of the Norwegian National Gallery. It is not clear how long Hauge spent in Marlotte but in 1900, he was again living in Paris, suffering from increasingly bad health.

In early 1901, after receiving funds from Norway, he travelled to Spain but died in Madrid on 2 February 1901, aged just 25.
