= Vågåsommeren =

Norwegian artist collective

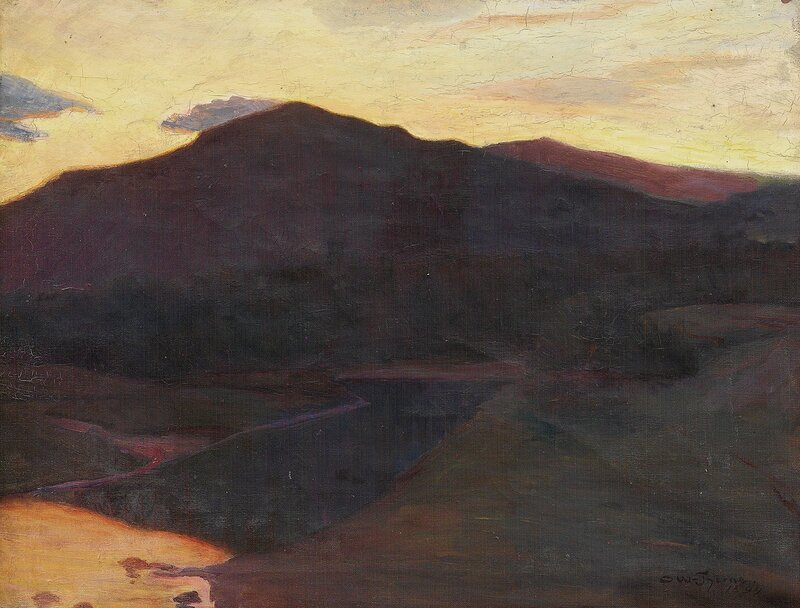
Kveld, painting by Oluf Wold-Torne (1894)

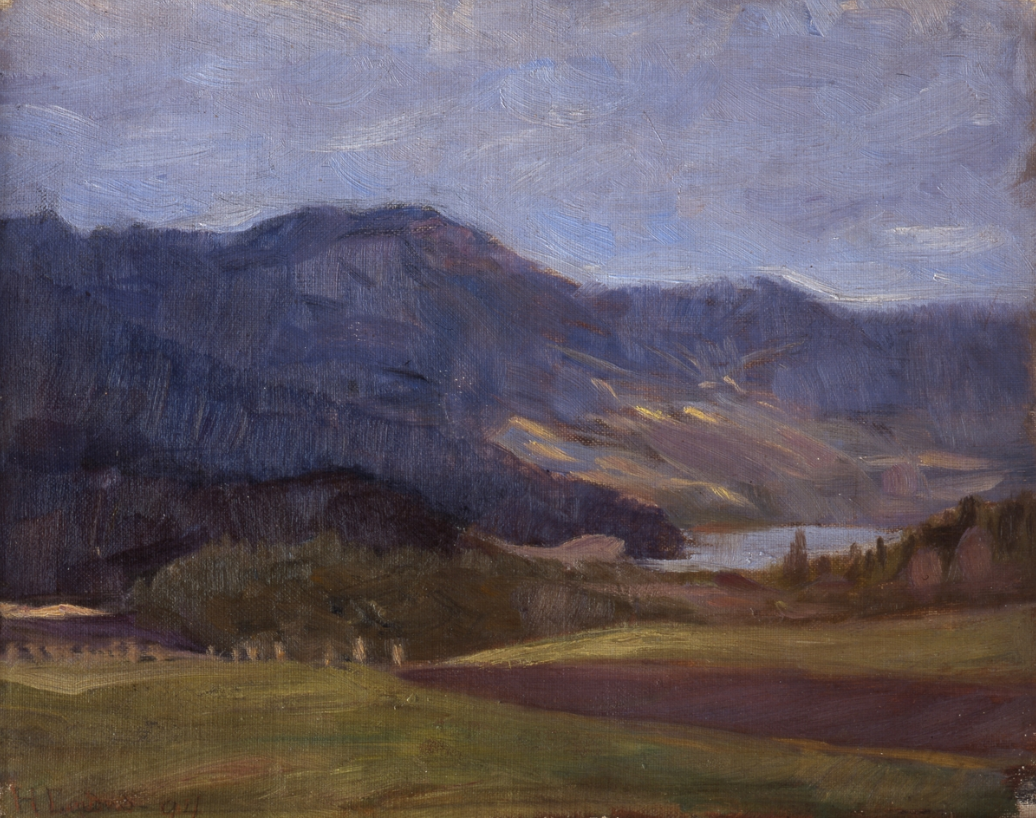
Fra Vågå, painting by Halfdan Egedius (1894)

Vågåsommeren or the Vågå Summer was a Norwegian artists' collective which came together in 1894 in Vågå Municipality in Innlandet county, Norway. It consisted of ten painters, all of whom had spent the previous year studying art at Harriet Backer's school in Kristiania (today's Oslo). They were looking for a more relaxed approach to painting than the strict, clear-cut Realism of the times.

Kristen Holbø, together with his good friend and fellow student Halfdan Egedius, both from Vågå, invited their fellow students to spend the summer in the area. The men, including Thorvald Erichsen, Alfred Hauge, Lars Jorde and Oluf Wold-Torne, stayed with Holbø in his house on the Holbø estate while the four women, Johanna Bugge Berge, Lalla Hvalstad, Alice Pihl and Kris Torne were accommodated in Sygard Storvik, a large two-story house in Sjårdalen which belonged to Egedius' father. The get-together started in May and lasted until September. It was remembered not just for the considerable efforts devoted to painting but as a social success for all concerned.

The artists concentrated on mood paintings, often creating landscapes in the summer evenings, with darker colours and a more simplified style than they had been taught at art school. Despite the rather rainy summer, the event was thought to have been a huge success, resulting in many fine paintings. They were exhibited in September in the local school, while several of the artists returned to Kristiania with works in the newly developed style. The gathering later became known as Vågåsommeren or the Vågå Summer.
