= Johanna Bugge Berge =

Norwegian painter, illustrator and church decorator (1874–1961)

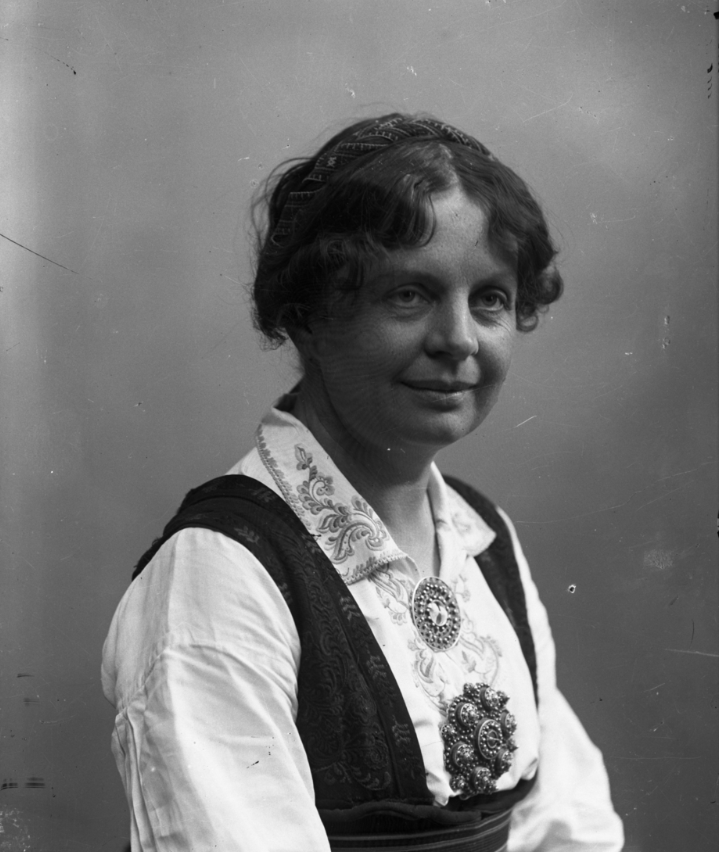
- Johanna Bugge Berge at the time around 1920
- Born: 1 October 1874; Oslo
- Died: 26 November 1961; Skien
- Resting place
- Occupations: Painter, illustrator
- Spouse: Rikard Berge
- Father: Sophus Bugge

Johanna Bugge Berge (1874–1961) was a Norwegian painter, illustrator and church decorator. In 1894, she was one of ten artists who participated in the Vågåsommeren artists' colony in Vaage Municipality in Kristians amt, Norway (now Vågå Municipality in Innlandet county). After marrying Rikard Berge in 1908, she illustrated several of his books with subjects from Norwegian folklore. In 1927, she performed extensive decoration work in Lunde Church (in Nome Municipality, Telemark).

== Early life ==
Born on 1 October 1874 in Kristiania (today's Oslo), Johanna Bugge was the daughter of the prominent linguist Elseus Sophus Bugge (1833–1907) and Karen Sophie Schreiner (1833–1897). Together with her two brothers, she was brought up in a well-to-do home where she was able to develop her talents. While still young, she furthered her interest in art by visiting Europe's principal galleries. In 1896, together with her brother Alexander, she spent a year in Rome studying ethography.

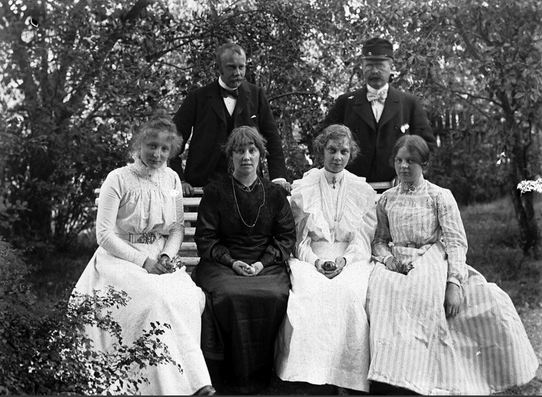
Johanna Bugge (far right) with (from left) Ingeborg Motzfeldt Løchen, Oluf Wold-Torne, Kris Torne, Lalla Hvalstad and Gerhard Munthe (c. 1899)

After completing her school education, in 1891 she spent a year at Kristiania's Art College. She then attended Harriet Backer's art school where she studied under Eilif Peterssen, Christian Skredsvig and Hans Heyerdahl. She befriended in particular her fellow art students Alice Pihl, Lalla Hvalstad and Kris Laache. In 1894, these four joined Kristen Holbø, a native of Vågå, and Halfdan Egedius, Lars Jorde, Thorvald Erichsen, Alfred Hauge and Oluf Wold-Torne, all students at Backer's school, to spend the summer months in Vågå's Sygard Storvik estate in what became known as "Vågåsommeren" (the Vågå Summer). There the painters set out to create symbolist landscapes, often depicting scenes at night. Bugge often walked deep into the forest in the summer evenings. One of her works depicts a dark brown forest flanking water in the foreground with the bluish hills under a brighter sky in the distance.

== Career ==
Bugge first exhibited in 1898 at the Autumn Exhibition with a figure painting, presenting two paintings the following year. Her Fra en Bondegaard received acclaim from the art expert Jens Thiis and the painter Gerhard Munthe. She presented Gårdsintriør at the 1900 Paris Exposition, receiving a Mention honorable. That year she joined Wold-Torne, Pihl, Valstad and Erichsen in Kviteseid Municipality for another summer painting get-together. She spent the winter of 1899 to 1900 in Copenhagen where she shared a large apartment with Kris and Oluf Wold-Torne and Lalla Hvalstad. All three women became pupils of Jens Ferdinand Willumsen. Bugge greatly appreciate the practical rather than academic assistance Willumsen was able to offer. Thanks to a travel grant, in the autumn of 1902, together with Hvalstad she went to Paris where she again received critical assistance from Willumsen who was also there at the time.

In 1908, Bugge married the folklorist Rikard Berge whom she had met during her visits to Kviteseid. As a result, she became less active as a painter, although she presented four works to the Autumn Exhibition in 1910. The couple settled in Kviteseid where Berge was a schoolteacher. In 1910, they moved to Øyfjell after Berge became attached to the Brekke Museum in Skien. Their daughter Gyrid was born in 1909 and their son Tone in 1911. Rikard increasingly concentrated on folklore, publishing Norske eventyr og sagn (Norwegian Folk Tales) in 1909, followed by further works on folklore in 1910 and 1911. All were illustrated by Johanna.

While Bugge Berge continued to paint portraits in the 1920s, in 1925 she decorated the ceiling, walls and gallery of the County Hall (Fylkehuset) in Skien. Two years later, she embarked on her last major assignment, decorating the church in Lunde with subjects inspired by folklore.

Johanna Bugge Berge died in Skien on 28 November 1961.
