= Lalla Hvalstad =

Norwegian painter and ceramist

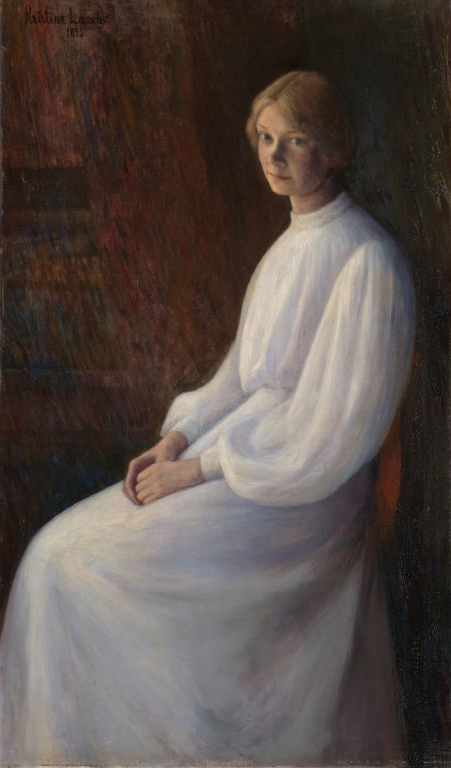
Lalla Hvalstad painted by Kris Torne (1895)

Ragnhild (Lalla) Hvalstad (1875–1962) was a Norwegian painter and ceramist. In 1894, she was one of ten artists who participated in the Vågåsommeren artists' colony in Vaage Municipality in Kristians amt (now called Vågå Municipality in Innlandet county). After painting portraits, interiors and landscapes, in 1922 she changed her focus to ceramics, studying in Faenza, Italy. On returning to Norway, she opened her own workshop in Bestum where together with Lili Scheel she created a wide variety of pottery, frequently decorated with flowers and fruits.

== Biography ==
Born on 7 March 1875 in Kristiania (now called Oslo), Ragnhild Hvalstad was the daughter of the factory manager Johannes Andersen Hvalstad (1832–1922) and his wife Marie Agnete Bjørnstad (1844–1922). She studied painting in Stockholm at Harriet Backer's school (1894–1895) and was a student of J.F. Willumsen in Copenhagen (1899–1900 and 1903). She befriended in particular her fellow art students Alice Pihl, Johanna Bugge Berge and Kris Laache. In 1894, these four joined Kristen Holbø, a native of Vågå Municipality, and Halfdan Egedius, Lars Jorde, Thorvald Erichsen, Alfred Hauge and Oluf Wold-Torne, all students at Backer's school, to spend the summer months in Vågå's Sygard Storvik estate in what became known as "Vågåsommeren" (the Vågå Summer).

In 1897, Hvalstc painted in Kviteseid Municipality together with Kris and Oluf Wold-Torne and Erichsen. For a time, she continued painting portraits, interiors and landscapes but after her parents died in 1922, she decided to make a change. On the advice of Henrik Sørensen, she decided to turn to ceramics. She travelled to Faenza where she learnt the traditional art dating back to the 17th century. On her return in 1923, she opened a workshop in Bestum in collaboration with Lili Scheel. The two worked together for almost 40 years until Hvalstad died in 1962. They produced a wide variety of tableware as well as tiles and smaller works, often decorated with flowers, fruits or figures inspired by European pottery from the 18th century but frequently incorporating designs from Norwegian rose painting.

Lalla Hvalstad died on 20 October 1962 in Oslo.
