= Kris Torne =

Norwegian painter and textile artist

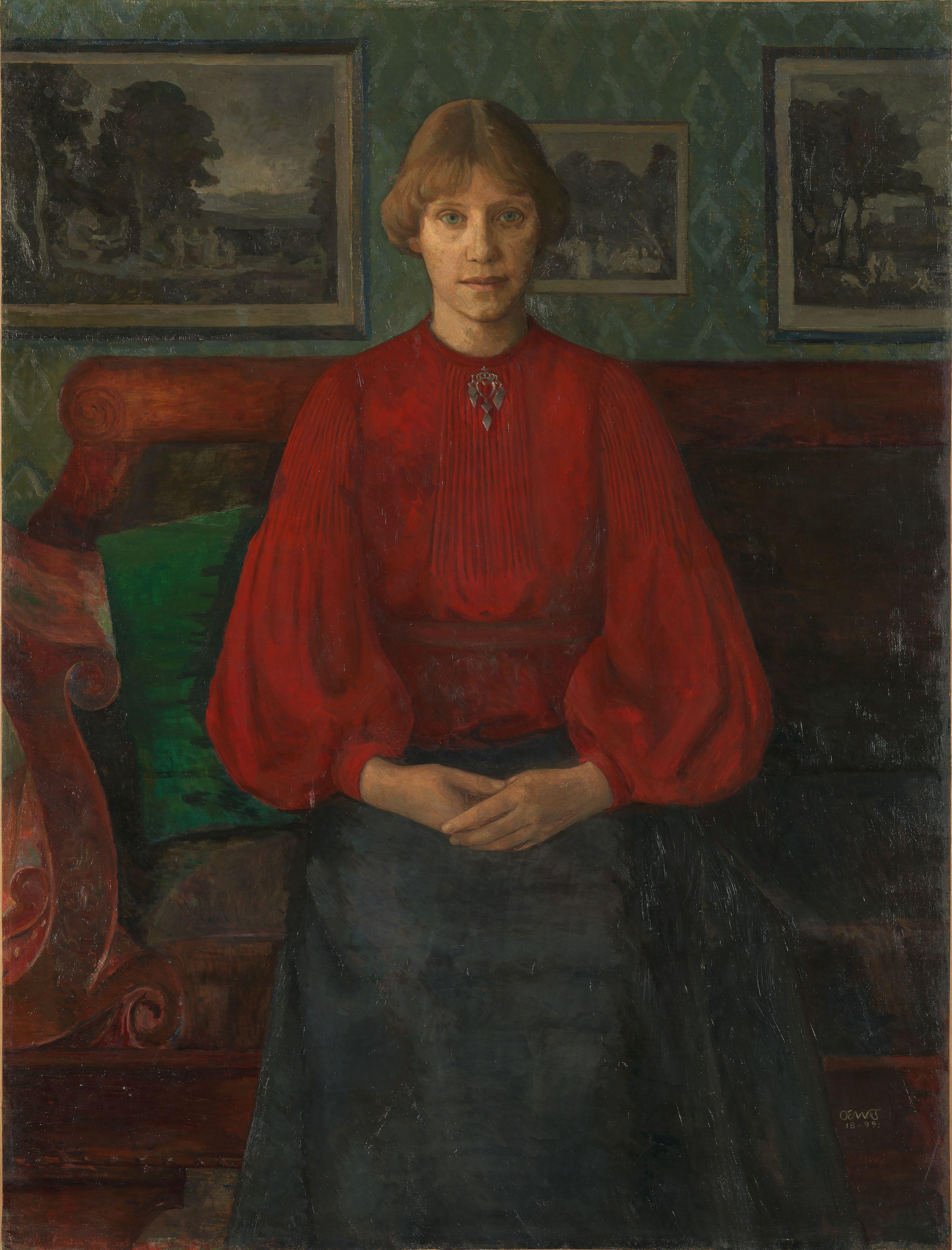
Kris Torne, portrait by Oluf Wold-Torne (1899)

Kristine (Kris) Torne née Laache (1 February 1867 – 24 April 1946, Florence, Italy) was a Norwegian painter and textile artist. In 1894, she was one of ten artists who participated in the Vågåsommeren artists' colony in Vågå Municipality, Innlandet County. After painting landscapes and portraits, one of which won a prize at the 1900 Paris Exposition, in 1906 she began creating embroidered works and rugs based on cartoons by her husband Oluf Wold-Torne.

== Biography ==
Born on 1 February 1867, possibly Trondheim or Steinkjer, Christine Laache was the daughter of Nils Jacob Laache (1831–1892), a priest and later bishop of Trondheim, and his wife Oline Andrine Nielsen (1835–1911). She was one of six children. In 1897, she married the painter Oluf Wold-Torne (1867–1919). In the 1890s, she studied under Eilif Peterssen and Harriet Backer and from 1899 to 1900, she was a student of Jens Ferdinand Willumsen in Copenhagen.

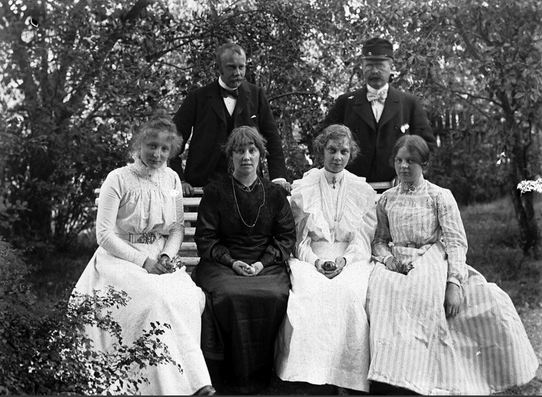
Kris Torne (in black) with (from left) Ingeborg Motzfeldt Løchen, Oluf Wold-Torne, Lalla Hvalstad, Gerhard Munthe and Johanna Bugge (c. 1899)

In 1894, Kris Laache spent the summer in Vågå together with a group of painters who were interested in advancing from the clear Realism of the times to a more atmospheric approach to painting with deeper colour and in a simpler style. In addition to Kristen Holbø who was a native of Vågå, they included Halfdan Egedius, Lars Jorde, Thorvald Erichsen, Alfred Hauge, Oluf Wold-Torne, Alice Pihl, Johanna Bugge Berge and Lalla Hvalstad. Now known as "Vågåsommeren" (the Vågå Summer), the event was a considerable success, resulting in several of the painters returning to Kristiania with mood paintings. That autun, together with Phil, Bugge Berge and Hvalstad, Laache established an association in Kristiania known as "Den dekorative forening" (The Decorative Society). After returning to Vågå in 1895, in 1897 Kris Torne painted in Kviteseid Municipality in Bratsberg county, together with a group including Wold-Torne, whom she had just married, Hvalstad and Erichsen.

Thanks to a series of grants, she was able to travel to France and Italy. At the 1900 Paris Exposition, her "Portrait of a Young Girl" received an award. Together with her husband, in 1904 she spent a year in Italy. She continued to paint portraits and landscapes for a number of years before turning to textile art. Working from her husband's cartoons, she embroidered decorative works and created rugs. In 1925, in an exhibition with the Artists Association (Kunstnerforbundet), she presented textile works and paintings she had created over the previous 25 years, including her self-portrait from 1899, her prize-winning Paris portrait, figure paintings from Italy and landscapes.

Kris Torne died in Florence, Italy, on 24 April 1946.
