= Halvdan Holbø =

Norwegian painter

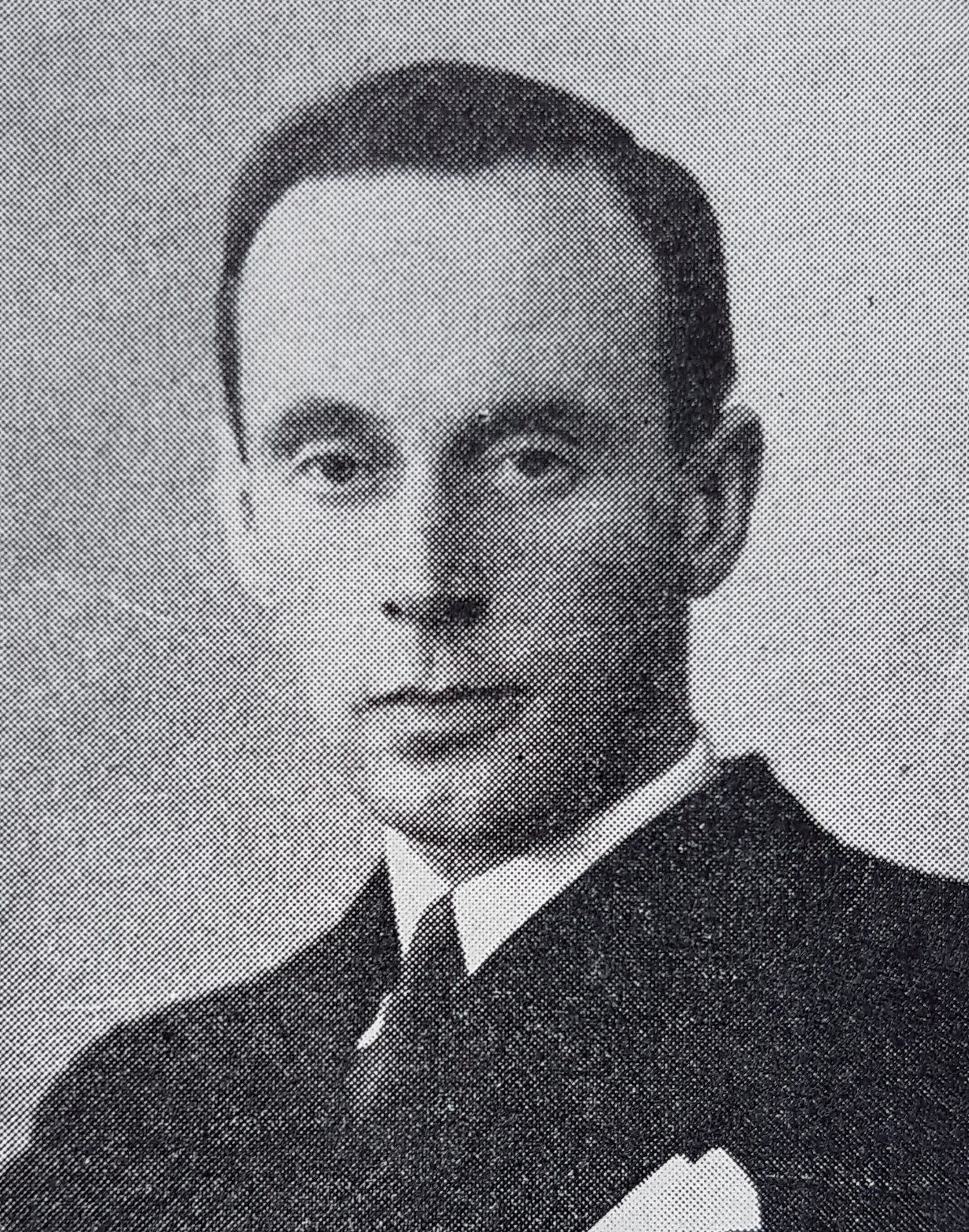

Halvdan Holbø (4 May 1907 in Vaage, Kristians amt – 21 September 1995) was a Norwegian painter.

He was born in Vaage Municipality (later spelled Vågå) as a son of Kristen Holbø. He studied under Søren Onsager, Anders C. Svarstad, Halfdan Strøm, and Jean Heiberg, and spent time in Paris. He is represented with five landscape paintings in the National Gallery of Norway.
