= Onsager =

Onsager is a surname. Notable people with the surname include:

- Lars Onsager (1903–1976), Norwegian–American physical chemist and theoretical physicist
- Søren Onsager (1878–1946), Norwegian painter

== See also ==
- Onsager Medal, an award in the fields of chemistry, physics and mathematics
- Onsager reciprocal relations, certain relations between flows and forces in thermodynamic systems
