= Marie Hauge =

Norwegian artist (1864–1931)

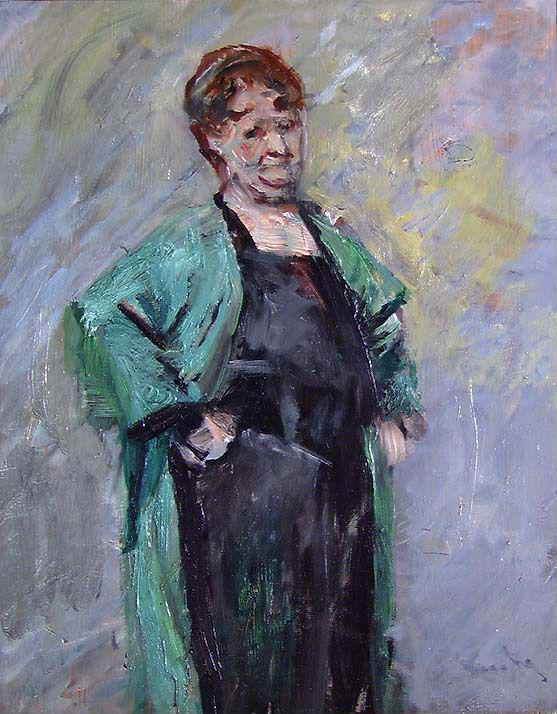
Marie Hauge

Marie Octavia Nielsen Hauge (8 July 1864 – 11 November 1931) was a Norwegian painter.

== Biography ==
Hauge was born at Drammen in Buskerud, Norway. She was the daughter of Hans Thulin Nielsen Hauge and Emilie Ziegler. She spent her later life at Asker in Akershus. In 1888, at the age of 24, she started at Christian Krogh and Hans Heyerdahl's school of art. She also studied under Eilif Peterssen, Erik Werenskiold, Sven Jørgensen and Harriet Backer between 1888 and 1900. In the early 1900s she was in Paris where she spent the years 1903 to 1907 at the Académie Colarossi and Académie des Beaux-Arts.

Hauge debuted at the Drammen Art Society in 1890 and then had a number of exhibitions. Her first solo exhibition was at the art gallery Blomqvist Kunsthandel in 1901. Besides her paintings, she made some statuettes and reliefs in small formats. She is represented with two works in the National Gallery of Norway. Her 1902 portrait of Aasta Hansteen in Drammen Museum is regarded as her most important piece.
