= Søren Onsager =

Norwegian painter (1878–1946)

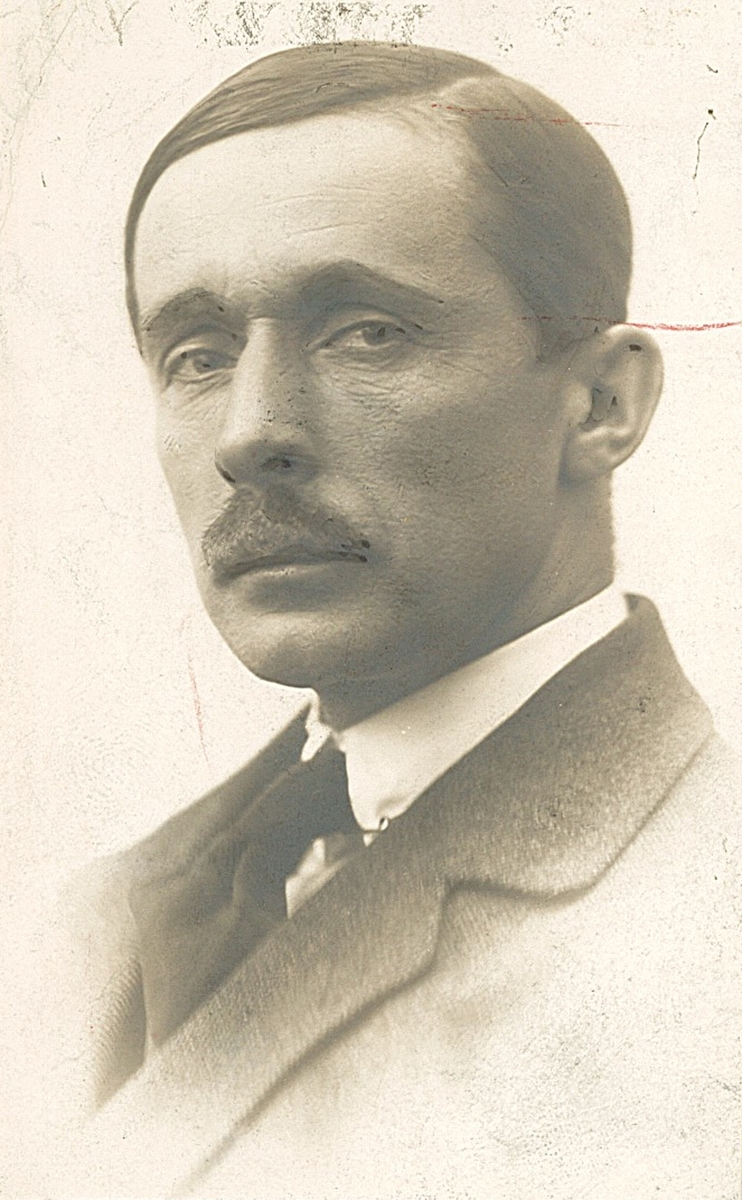
Søren Onsager (ca. 1930–1935)

Søren Onsager (6 October 1878 – 28 November 1946) was a Norwegian painter.

Onsager was born at Holmestrand in Vestfold, Norway. His parents were Martin Onsager (1849–1926) and Laura Dorothea Christensen (1858–1934). His father operated pharmacies in which he first apprenticed. However an Italian trip during 1897–1898 was the turning point in his life. Upon his return to Norway, he trained with Harriet Backer. After a year, she sent him to Kristian Zahrtmann in Copenhagen, where he was for two years. During the period from 1902 to 1910, he went to Paris to study with Christian Krogh at Colarossi Academy. In 1908, he first exhibited at the Salon des Beaux-Arts in Paris. Onsager was appointed professor at the Oslo National Academy of the Arts during the Nazi occupation of Norway from 1940 to 1945. After the war, Onsager was indicted for treason, but he died in prison after a long illness before his case came up.
