= Niels Laache =

Norwegian revivalist, writer, and bishop (1831–1892)

Right Reverend Niels Jacob Jensen Laache
- Bishop
- Church: Church of Norway
- Diocese: Nidaros

Personal details
- Born: 6 November 1831 Ullensaker, Norway
- Died: 5 February 1892 (aged 60) Trondheim, Norway
- Denomination: Christian
- Parents: Jens Knudsen Laake; Dorthe Jacobsdatter Hallingstad
- Spouse: Oline Andrine Nielsen (1859–1892)
- Occupation: Priest
- Education: Det teologiske fakultet

Niels Jacob Jensen Laache (6 November 1831 – 5 February 1892) was a Norwegian revivalist, writer, and bishop.

Laache was born in 1831 in Ullensaker, Norway. He received his theology degree in 1858 and became a priest in 1863. For the next 20 years, he served as pastor, revivalist preacher and local politician in Steinkjer Municipality, Eidanger Municipality, and Arendal Municipality. In 1883, he was appointed as the bishop of Trondhjems stift, a post which he held until his death in 1892. He was also the editor of the Christian magazine For Fattig og Riig. He was decorated Knight of the Royal Norwegian Order of St. Olav in 1885.

== Selected works ==
- Om Omvendelsen, dens Nødvendighed, dens Begreb og dens Kjendemærker (1860)
- Om Alterens Sakramente, dets Nytte og rette Brug (1864)
- Om Børneopdragelsen. Nogle Ord til Opmuntring og Veiledning for Forældre og Andre (Steinkjer 1871)
- Om Dands (Bergen 1873)
- Vort jordiske Arbeide i Herrens Tjeneste (1880)
- Husandagts-Bog. Bibelstykker med Betragtninger til hver Dag, ordnede efter Kirkeaaret (1883)
- Til Menighederne i Trondhjems Stift! (Trondheim 1884)
- Forklaring over Luthers lille Katekismus (posthumous 1892)
- Biskop Laaches Prædikener over Høimesse- og andre Texter (posthumously compiled by C. M. Eckhoff, 1893)

Church of Norway
| Preceded by Andreas Grimelund | Bishop of Trondhjem; 1883–1892 | Succeeded by Johannes Skaar |
