= Oluf Wold-Torne =

Norwegian painter, illustrator and designer (1867–1919)

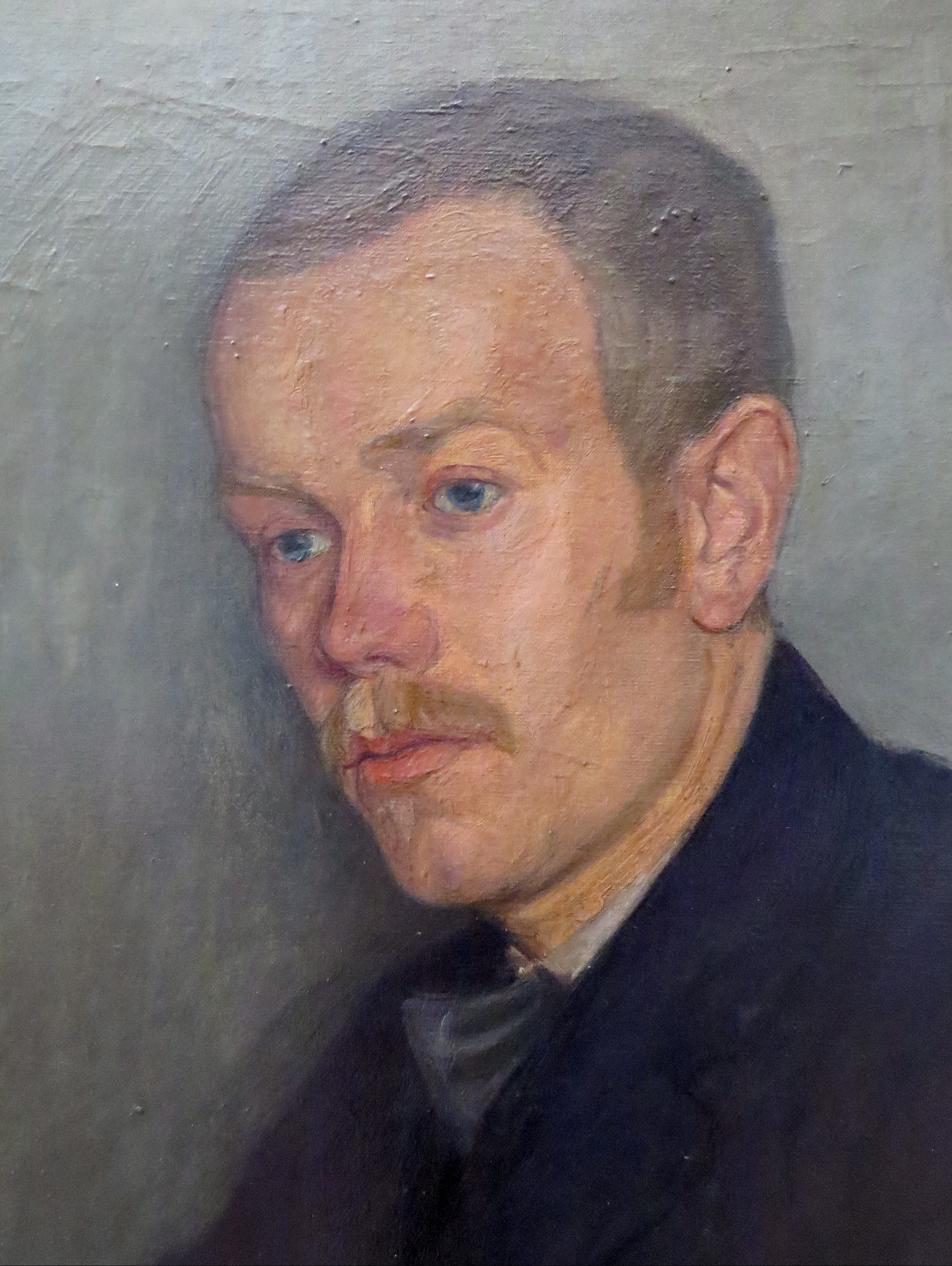
- Oluf Wold-Torne by Vilhelm Tetens (1893) Hirschsprung Collection
- Born: 7 November 1867; Son, Norway
- Died: 19 March 1919 (aged 51)
- Occupations: Painter, illustrator, educator and designer

Oluf Wold-Torne (7 November 1867 – 19 March 1919) was a Norwegian painter, illustrator, educator and designer. He was known primarily for landscapes and still-lifes and was influenced by Cézanne.

== Biography ==
He was born in Son (now Vestby), Norway. He was the son of Oluf Emil Wold (1826–1867) and Marie Therese Ottesen (1838–1893). His father had been in the timber business, but went bankrupt and died before he was born. In 1869 his mother married merchant Søren Thorne (1817–1900). He grew up in the village of Hølen in Akershus where his step-father owned a general store.

After displaying some artistic talent, his relatives sent him for his first art lessons at the Royal Drawing School (now Norwegian National Academy of Craft and Art Industry) in 1887, under Wilhelm Peters. Two years later, he enrolled at the Royal Danish Academy of Fine Arts in Copenhagen, but was dissatisfied with the program there so, in 1890, he enrolled at the art school operated by Kristian Zahrtmann. Subsequently he was a student of Erik Werenskiold and Eilif Peterssen, in 1891.

In 1893, he traveled to Paris with his friend Thorvald Erichsen, and studied with Fernand Cormon and Alfred Philippe Roll. He then lived in Florence for a year from 1895 to 1896. In 1897, he designed currency for the Norges Bank. He had his first major exhibit in 1899 at the Høstutstillingen in Oslo.

In 1910, together with Henrik Sørensen, Arne Kavli and Erichsen, he was one of the founding members of the Artist Association (Kunstnerforbundet), the oldest artist's gallery of contemporary art in Oslo. From 1912 until 1917, he was a teacher at the Royal Drawing School.

== Personal life ==
His wife was the painter and textile artist, Kristine Laache (1867–1946), daughter of Nils Jacob Laache, Bishop of Trondheim. Together, they created designs for stained glass, stationery and jewelry. Periodically between 1907 and 1910, he also designed porcelain and ceramics for the Porsgrund Porcelain Factory.

== Awards ==
He received 1st prize at the Kunstindustrimuseet in Oslo (1898). He was awarded a bronze medal for Verdensutst (1900) at the Exposition Universelle in Paris. He was awarded the Finnes legat (1894), Houens legat (1904) and Rasmus Meyers legat (1917).

He is represented in the National Gallery (Nasjonalgalleriet) by a number of his works including Kunstnerens hustru, malerinnen Kristine f. Laache (1899), Hest i fjellet (ca. 1902), Fajansekatten (1907) and Blått badehus (1911).

== Gallery ==
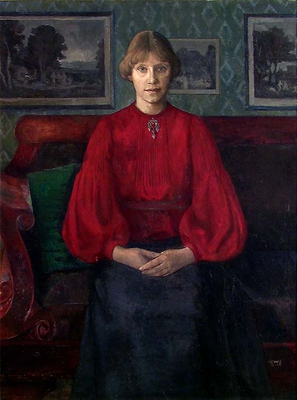
The Artist's Wife,
Kristine Laache (1899)

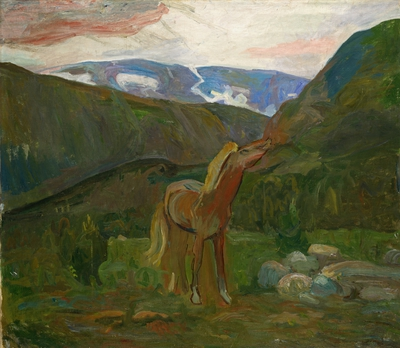
Horse in the Mountains (ca. 1902)

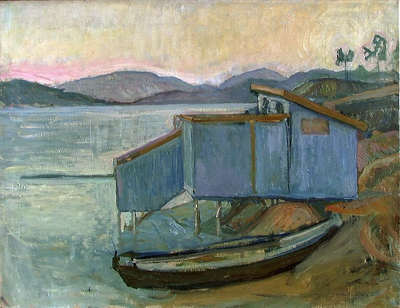
Blue Bath House (1911)

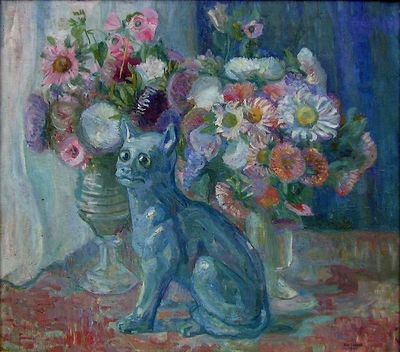
Faience Cat (1907)
