= Kristen Holbø =

Norwegian painter and illustrator (1869–1953)

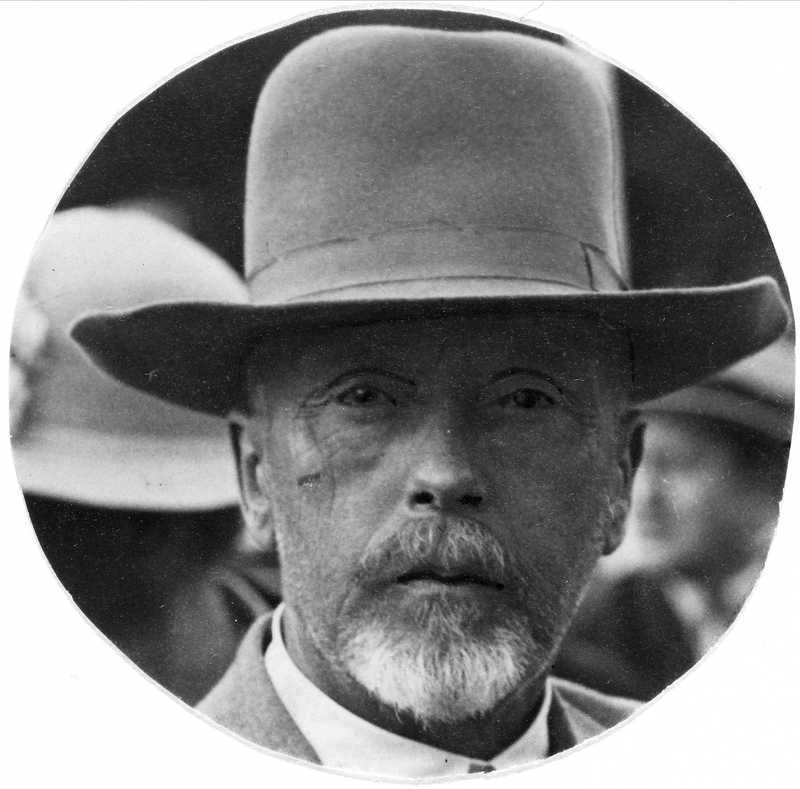
Kristen Holbø

Kristen Holbø (13 September 1869 – 19 October 1953) was a Norwegian painter and illustrator, most noted for his landscapes.

== Biography ==
He was born on Sygard Holbø in Vaage Municipality (now spelled Vågå) in Christians amt (county), Norway. He studied under Knud Bergslien in 1890, Eilif Peterssen and Harriet Backer in 1893 and 1894, and under Kristian Zahrtmann during the winters from 1897 to 1902. In 1909, Holbø held his first solo exhibition in Christiania Art Society. Holbø lived in Vaage Municipality until 1912, when the family moved to Lillehammer Municipality. From 1946 he received the National Artist salary.

His painting had a distinctly home-like tone, with a broad brush and robust palette. He often portrayed his home village and surrounding mountains of Gudbrandsdalen. As a landscape painter he described first and foremost his hometown, and also the mountainous area of Jotunheimen. During several summers, he also painted from Hvasser and Tjøme, both in Vestfold county. He is represented with eleven paintings and two illustrations in the National Gallery of Norway.

== Personal life ==
Holbø was married in 1905 to Anna Harildstad (1871–1958). He was the father of Norwegian artist, Halvdan Holbø.
