= National Gallery (Norway) =

Art gallery in Oslo, Norway

Coordinates: 59.9162°N 10.7375°E

The National Gallery
- Nasjonalgalleriet
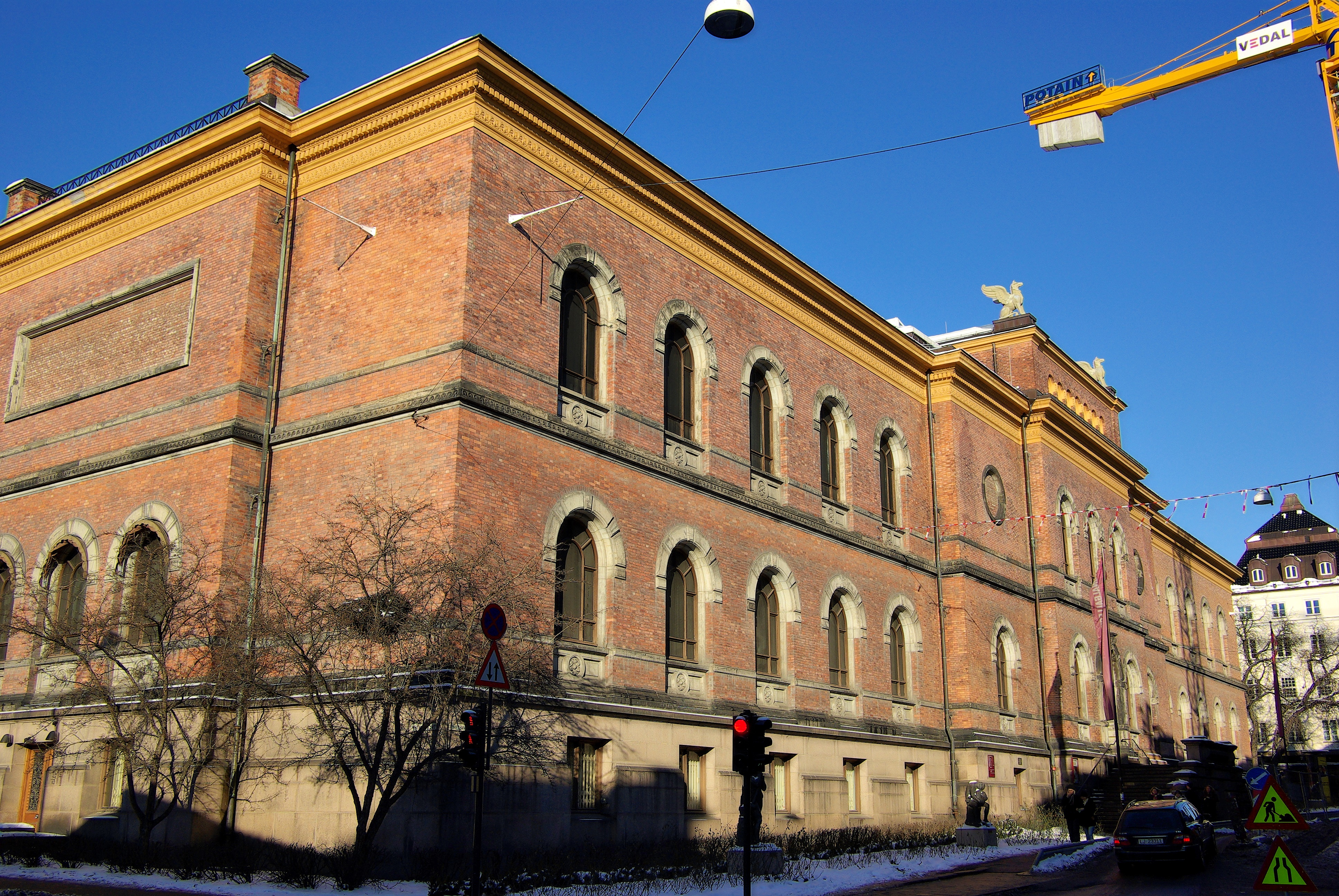
- Established: 1842
- Location: Oslo, Norway
- Type: Art museum
- Website: nasjonalmuseet.no/the-national-gallery

The National Gallery (Norwegian: Nasjonalgalleriet) is a gallery in Oslo, Norway. Since 2003 it is administratively a part of the National Museum of Art, Architecture and Design.

== History ==
It was established in 1842 following a parliamentary decision from 1836. Originally located in the Royal Palace, Oslo, it got its own museum building in 1882, designed by Heinrich Ernst and Adolf Schirmer. Former names of the museum include Den norske stats sentralmuseum for billedkunst and from 1903 to 1920 Statens Kunstmuseum. Directors include Jens Thiis (1908–1941), Sigurd Willoch (1946–1973), Knut Berg (1975–1995), Tone Skedsmo (1995–2000), and Anniken Thue (2001–2003).

That the gallery had erroneously been labeled as technically unfit for paintings was reported in 2013. (A previous study—about the museums—tåleevne) had never concluded about the fitness level, and Norway's parliament had been misinformed about conclusions that in reality did not exist. )

On April 4th 2016, the price for admission doubled overnight, jumping from 50kr to 100kr.

The museum collection was moved to a new building, opened on 11 June 2022, gathering all sections of the National Gallery, except architecture. It is located on the harbor front, as part of the Fjordbyen development, and the new building was designed by architects Kleihues + Schuwerk (de), following their win in an architecture competition held in November 2010.

== Collection ==
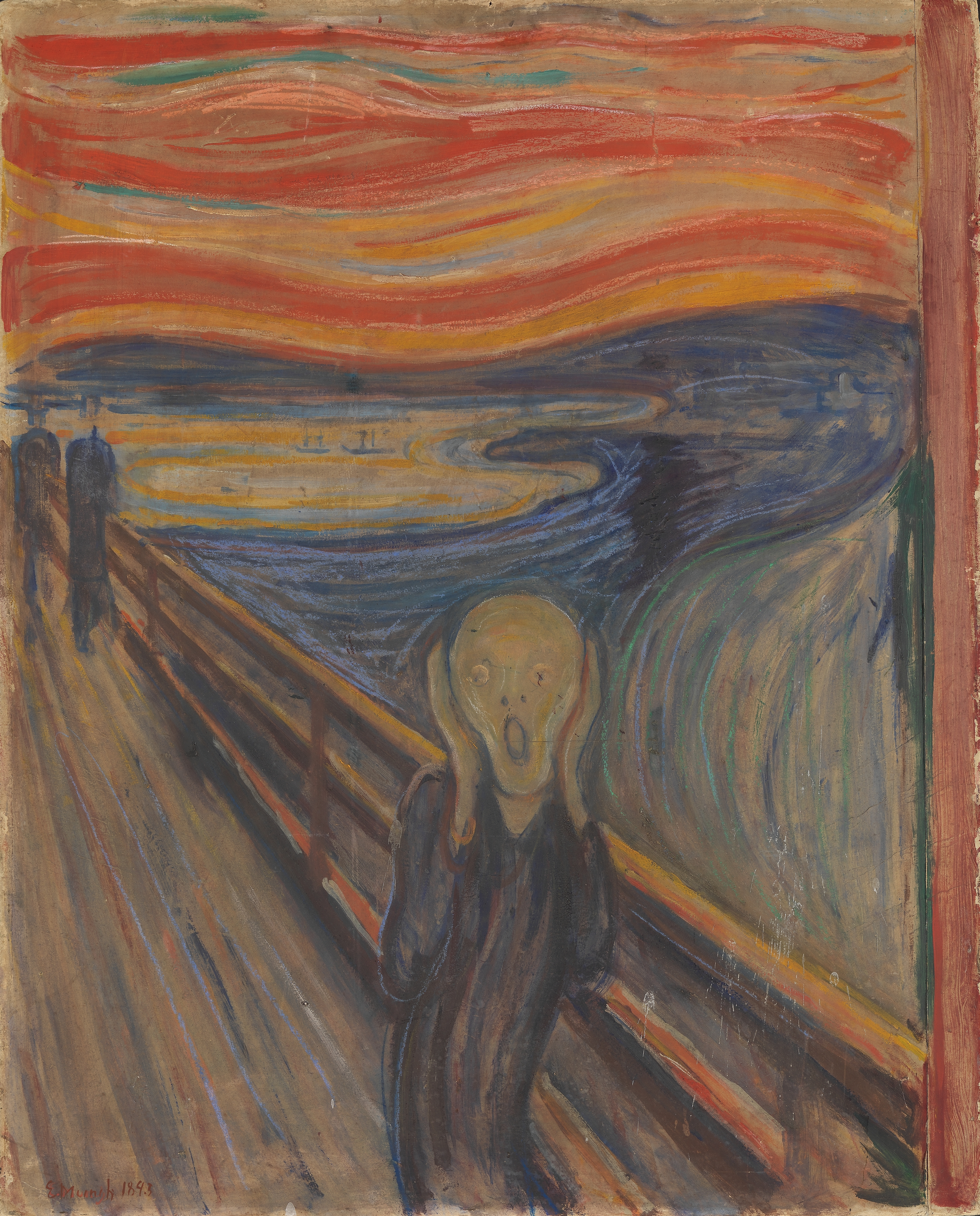
The Scream, 1893 by Edvard Munch

The Gallery includes pieces by sculptor Julius Middelthun, painters Johan Christian Claussen Dahl, Erik Werenskiold and Christian Krohg as well as works by Edvard Munch including The Scream and one version of his Madonna.

The museum also has many old master European paintings by painters such as El Greco, Lucas Cranach the Elder (Golden Age), Gaulli (Sacrifice of Noah), Orazio Gentileschi, Artemisia Gentileschi, Andrea Locatelli (Bachannal Scene), Pieter Elinga (Letter Carrier), Ferdinand Bol, Daniel De Blieck (Church Interior), Jacob van der Ulft (Seaport), Cornelis Bisschop (Seamstress) and Jan van Goyen. There are also 19th and 20th Century International paintings by Armand Guillaumin, Carl Sohn, Auguste Renoir, Claude Monet (Rainy Day, Etretat), Paul Cézanne, and Pablo Picasso. There are also Norwegian paintings by Adolph Tidemand, Hans Gude, Harriet Backer, and Lars Jorde.

== See also ==
- List of largest art museums
