= Halfdan Egedius =

19th century Norwegian painter and illustrator

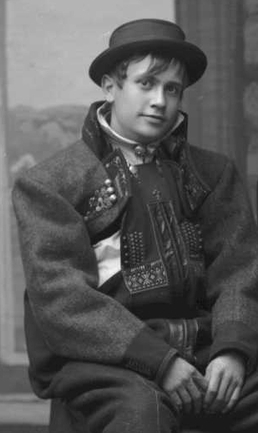
Halfdan Egedius in 1895

Halfdan Egedius (May 5, 1877 – February 2, 1899) was a Norwegian painter and illustrator.

== Biography ==
Halfdan Johnsen Egedius was born in Drammen in Buskerud county and grew up in Christiania (now Oslo). His interest in painting and illustration began at the age of 5 and he showed exceptional artistic abilities early. He attended art school from the age of 9 at the school of art of Knud Bergslien, where he was a pupil from 1886 to 1889. In 1891 he was a pupil of Erik Werenskiold, and from 1891 to 1892 he studied at the Arts and Crafts School in Christiania. In 1894 he attended the Harriet Backer art school. During spring 1896, he was a student of Kristian Zahrtmann in Copenhagen. From the age of 15 he began painting the landscape of Telemark.

Professionally known as Halfdan Johnsen Egedius, he was active from the age of 16 until his premature death at the age of 21. In his short life he managed to create several Norwegian masterpieces in a variety of styles. He is best known for his illustrations of the Heimskringla in a style inspired by Werenskiold.

Egedius became ill during a summer stay in Telemark in 1898, and after relapsing before Christmas, was hospitalized in Christiania, where he died in February 1899, not yet 22 years old. The cause of death was actinomycosis, a bacterial infection that attacked the internal organs. He was buried in the churchyard at Vestre Aker. Fifty years after his death, a memorial stone was erected.

== Gallery ==
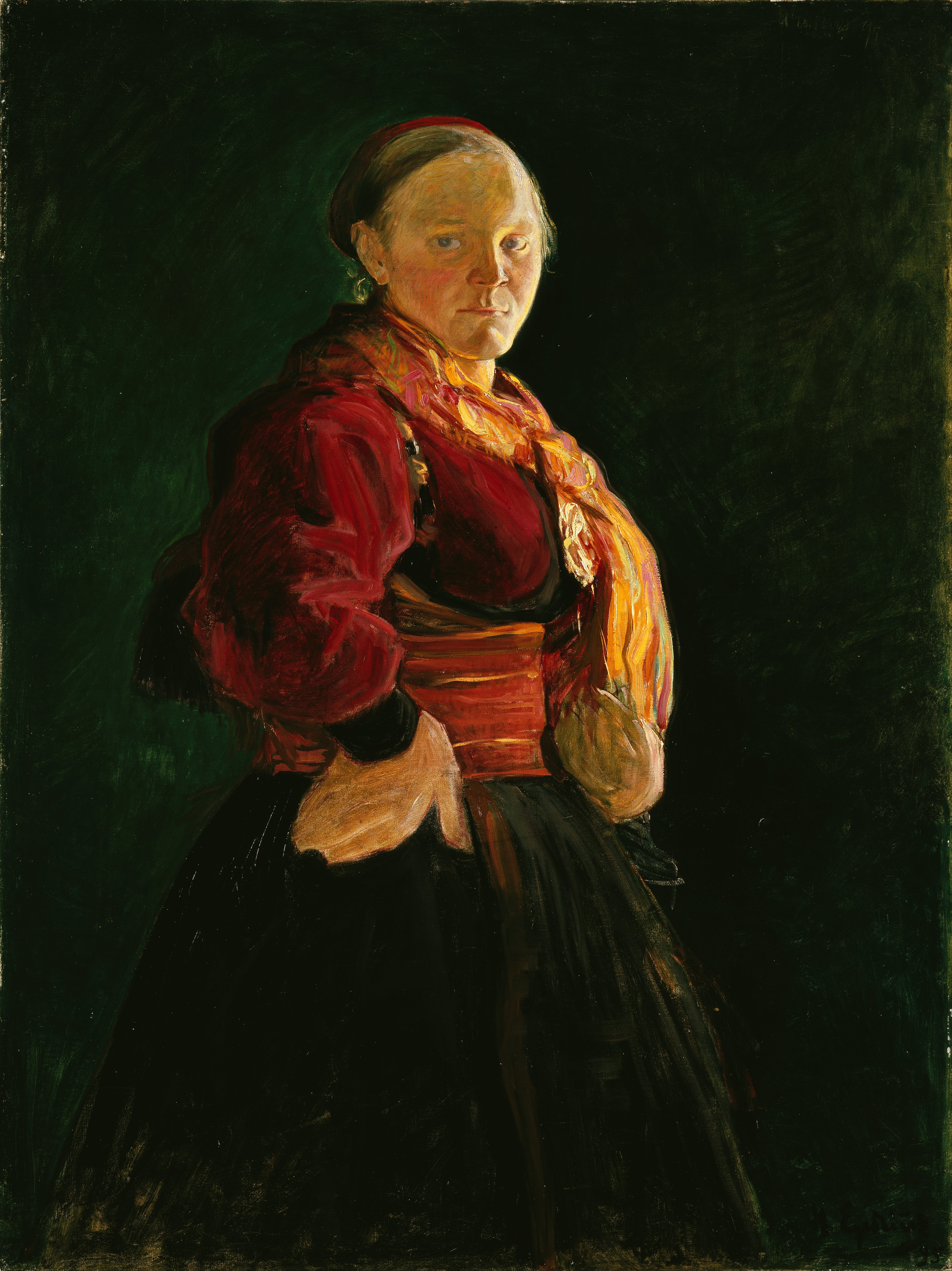
Portrait of Mari Clasen (oil on canvas, 1895)

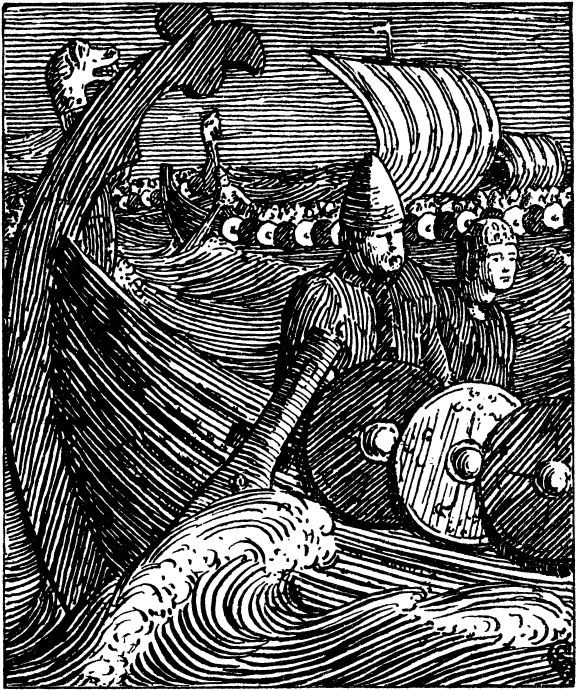
Illustration for St. Olaf's Saga, Heimskringla (1897)

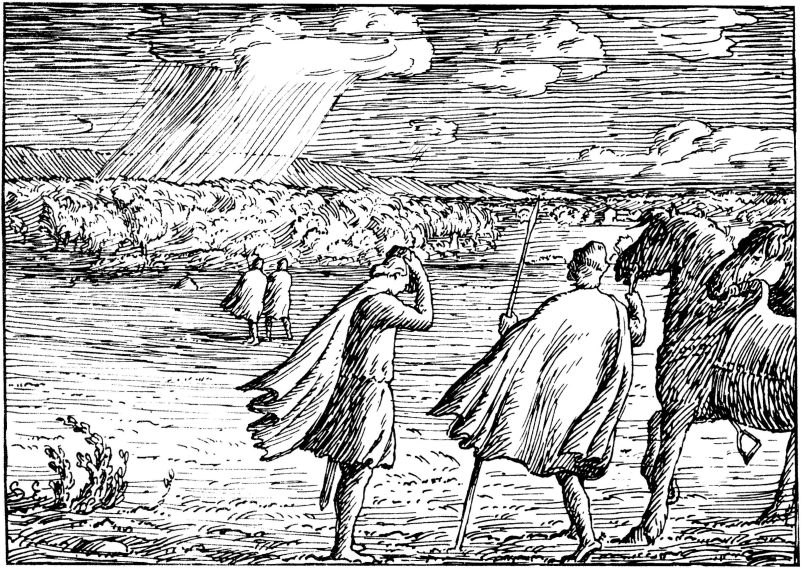
Illustration for Saga of Magnus the Good, Heimskringla (1898)

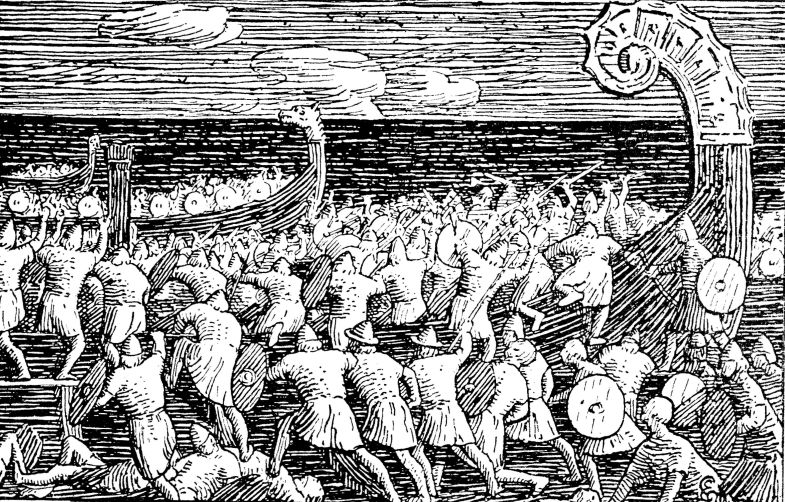
Illustration for Saga of Olaf Tryggvason, Heimskringla (1897)

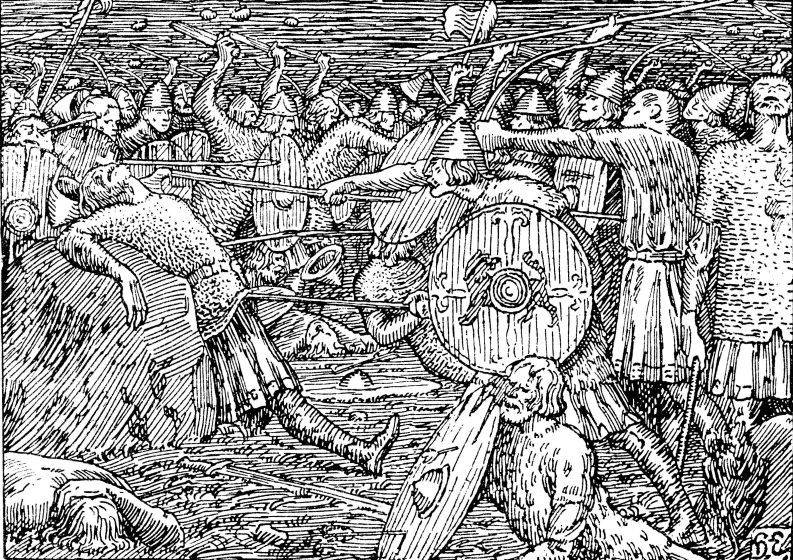
Illustration for St. Olaf's Saga, Heimskringla (1899).

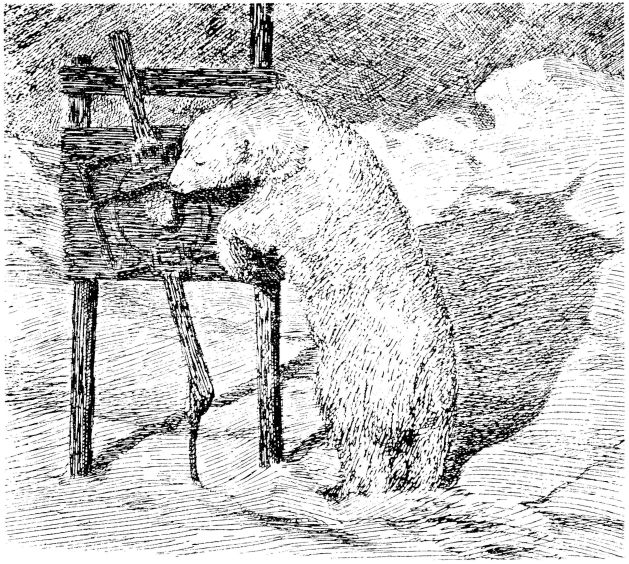
Illustration for Fridtjof Nansen's Fram over Polhavet: den norske polarfærd 1893-1896 (1897)

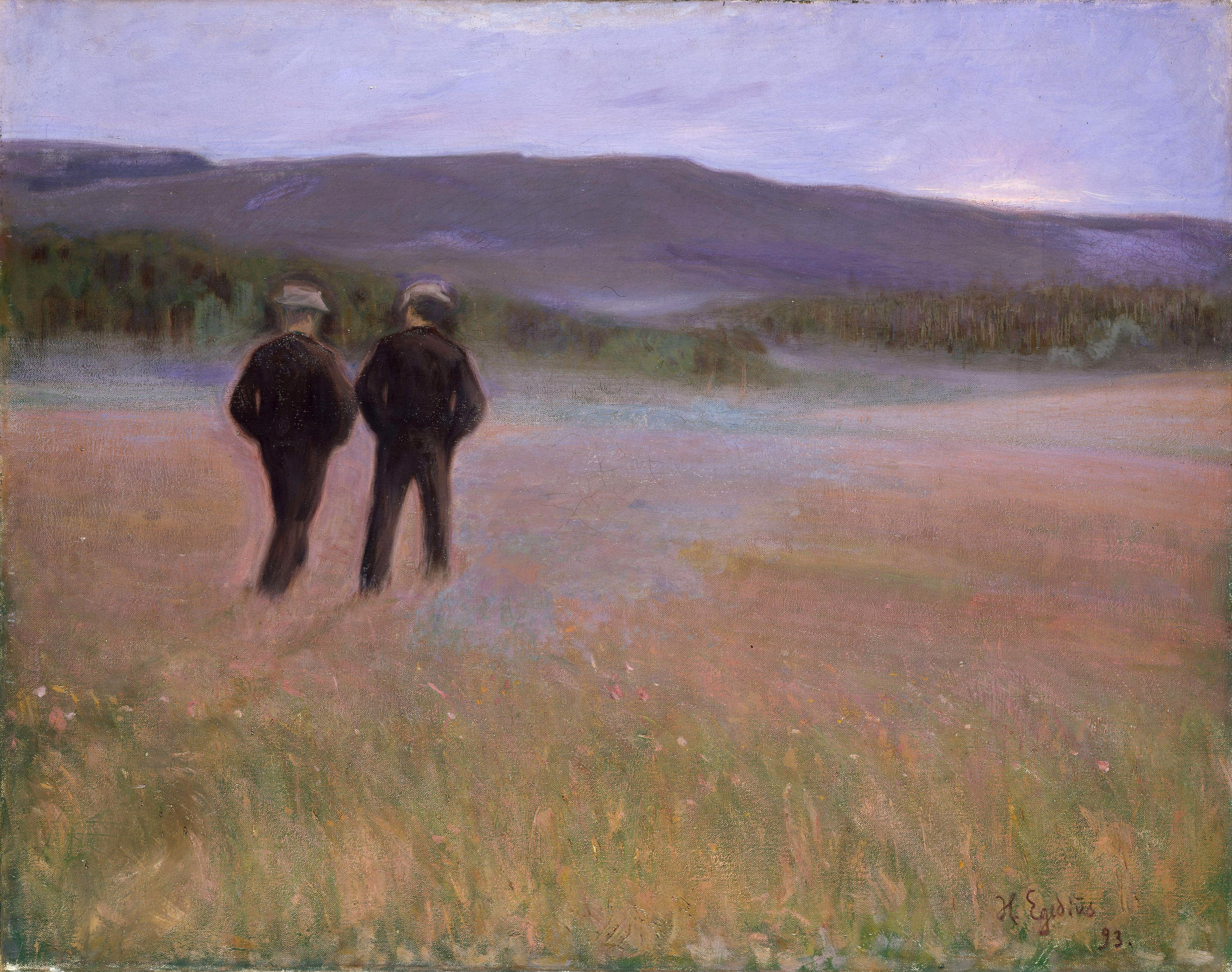
Summer's Eve (1893)

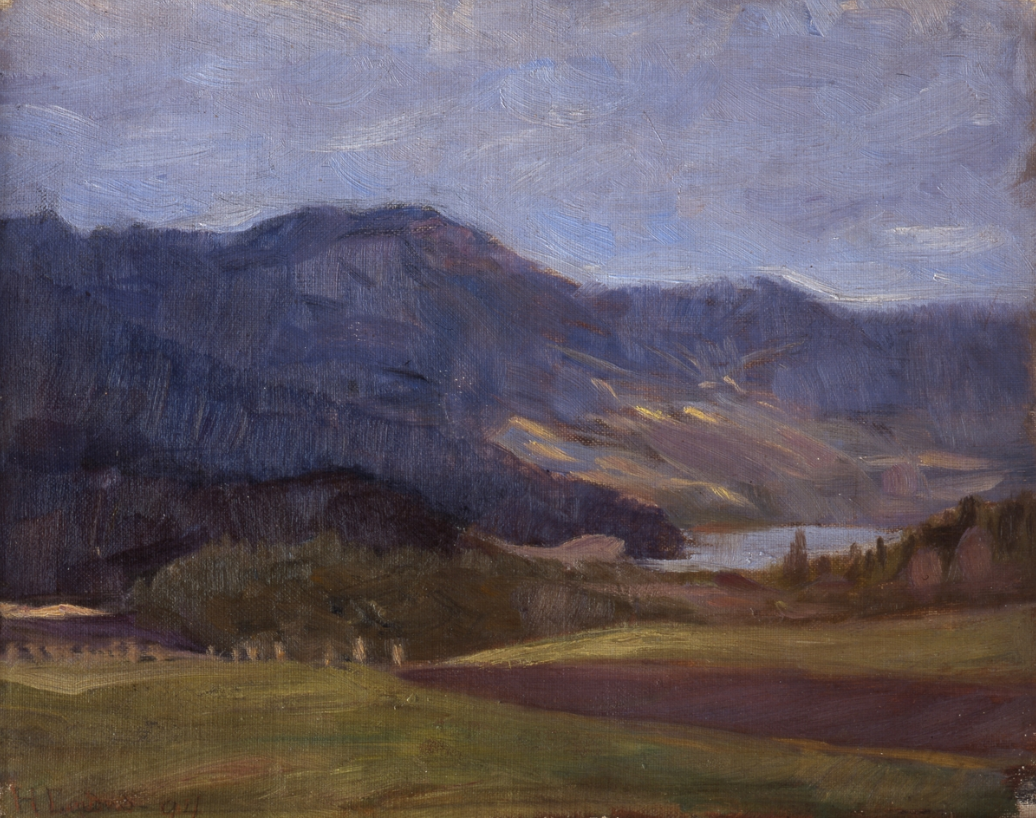
Fra Vågå (1894)

== Sources ==
- Walther Halvorsen. Halfdan Egedius. Gyldendal 1914
- Øistein Parmann. Halfdan Egedius: liv og verk. Dreyer, Oslo, 1990. ISBN 82-09-01753-5
