= Lars Jorde =

Norwegian painter and illustrator (1865–1939)

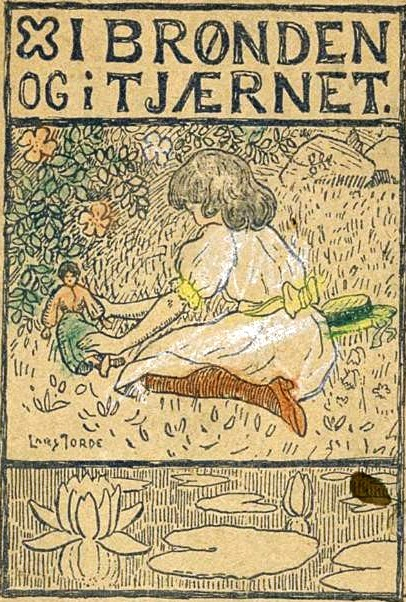
I brønden og i tjernet cover of drawn by Lars Jorde. 1898

Lars Jorde (22 May 1865 – 25 September 1939) was a Norwegian painter and illustrator.

== Biography ==
He was born at Vang Municipality in Hedmark, Norway. He entered the Norwegian National Academy of Craft and Art Industry in 1889. He studied under Gerhard Munthe, Alfred Philippe Roll, Eilif Peterssen and Harriet Backer, and Kristian Zahrtmann. He studied at Paris and in Italy. In 1905, he moved to Lillehammer and in 1912 to a house that Thorvald Erichsen had had built based upon design by Arnstein Arneberg. He lived in Lillehammer until his death in 1939.

He provided decorative work at the Vingrom Chapel in Lillehammer (1908), the student hall at the Norwegian College of Agriculture in Ås Municipality, and made a series of decorations for Granheim Sanatorium in Follebu (1908–27). In 1925 he decorated Sjøli Chapel in Ytre Rendal Municipality.

He painted in different styles over the course of his career, and is represented with several works in the National Gallery of Norway. Jorde also worked as an illustrator, illustrating Nansen and Sverdrup's Fram over polhavet (1897) and Andersen's I cancelliraadens dage (1907) and I brønden og i tjernet by Jørgen Moe (1898).
