= Thorvald Erichsen =

Norwegian painter

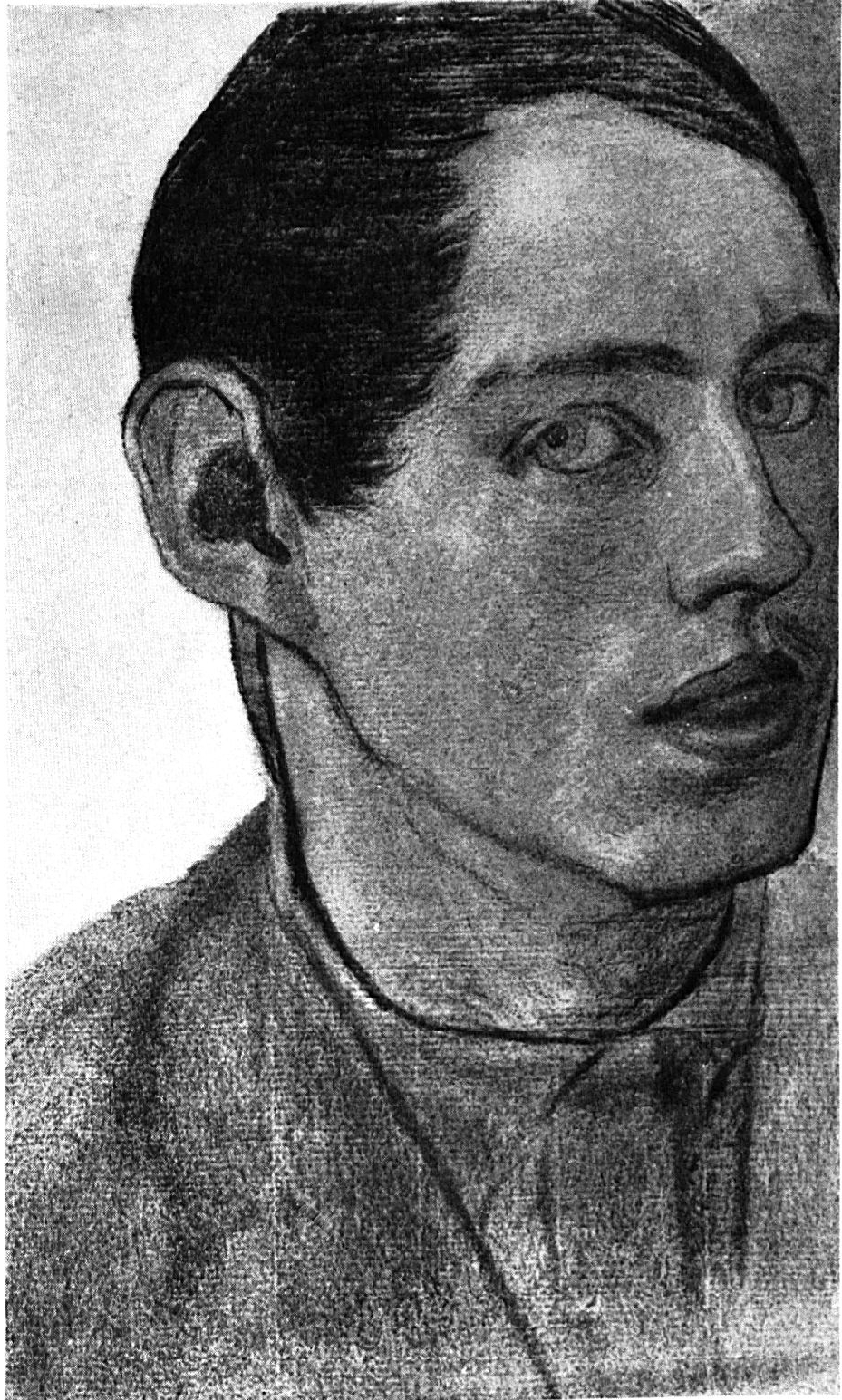
Self-portrait (1900s)

Thorvald Erichsen (18 July 1868 – 23 December 1939) was a Norwegian Post-Impressionist painter; known primarily for landscapes and still-lifes.

== Biography ==
Thorvald Erichsen was born at Trondheim, Norway. He was the son of Ernst Erichsen (1820–1869), a confectioner, and Trine Jensine née Rian (1829–1884). His father died while Erichsen was still very young.

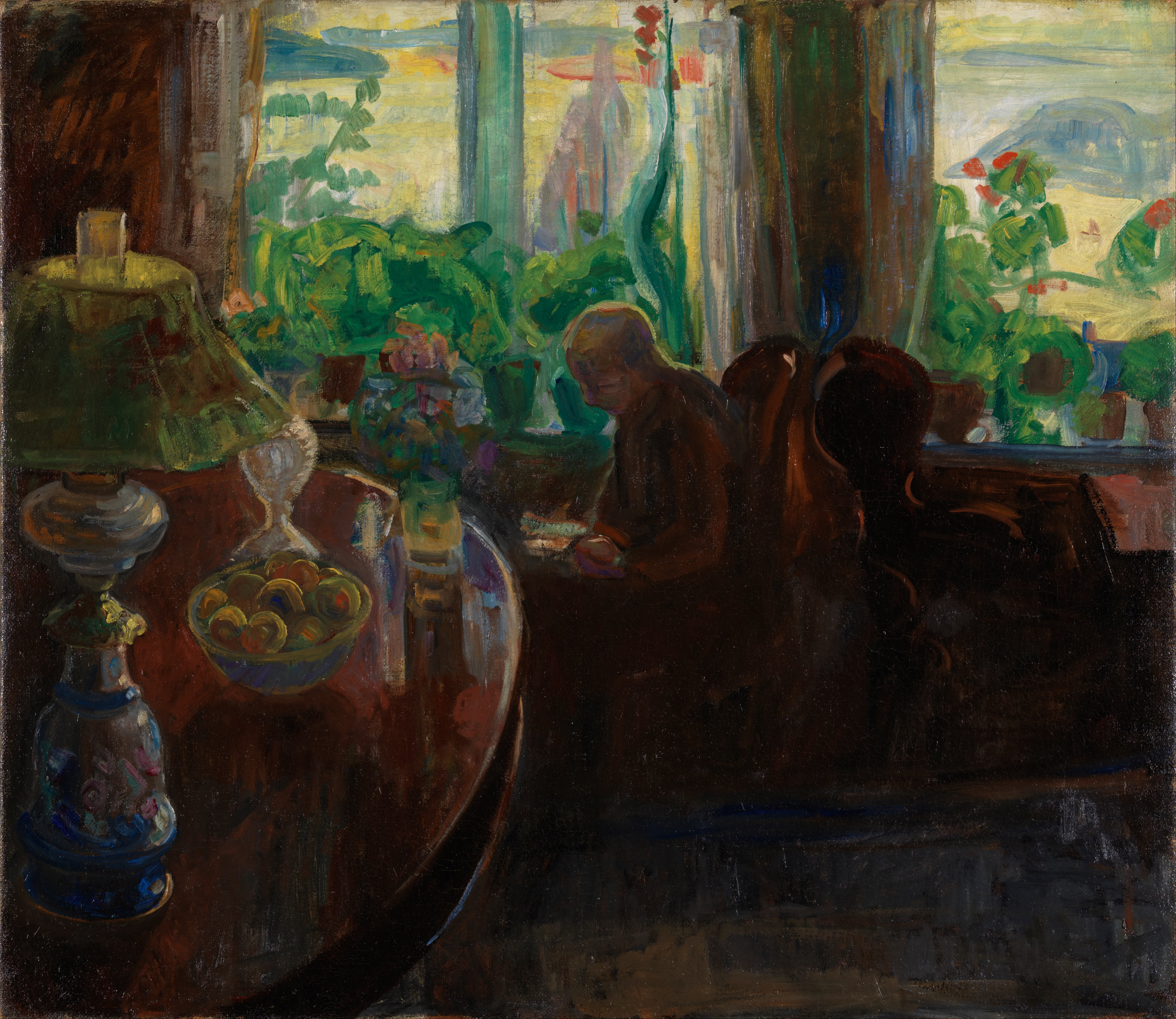
Interior with Oluf Wold-Torne

Although he originally wanted to be pianist, he began as a law student in 1886, then interrupted his studies to attend the painting school operated by Knud Bergslien, where he took the arts and crafts course. Later, he moved to Copenhagen, where he became a student of Kristian Zahrtmann, who had a more profound influence on his artistic development.

He also travelled to Italy and Paris, where he met with artist Pierre Bonnard and absorbed the influences of late Impressionism. His début came in 1891 with the painting Spring Mood. He would continue to travel extensively throughout his life and never settled in one place.

In 1900, his style made a dramatic change, from a Naturalistic approach to an emphasis on color and shape becoming, together with his friend, Oluf Wold-Torne, one of the pioneers of Modern Norwegian painting. His most notable works from this period are several nudes and landscapes from the vicinity of Telemark.

In 1907, his elder brother Ole Erichsen (1863–1949) a member of the Storting, obtained a major commission for him, but it was never completed. From 1907 to 1910, he lived in Vestre Gausdal Municipality and focused on bluish winter landscapes. During his last year there, he was invited to enter a competition for decorating the main hall at the University of Oslo, but declined.

In 1915, Erichsen appears to have suffered from a nervous breakdown, precipitated by a troubled relationship with the composer, Reidar Brøgger (1886–1956). After recovering, he worked in a quieter style, doing most of his work during summers in Holmsbu. His later works focus on the countryside around Lillehammer Municipality, where he lived for extended periods. He also created numerous still lifes, framed by the window of his hotel room, and often went for long periods without painting.

Although he lived in isolation, his paintings were popular and were sold throughout Europe. He was awarded a Gold medal at 1929 Barcelona International Exposition. In 1930, he was awarded an annual stipend for artists (Statens Kunstnerlønn). He died at Oslo of leukemia in 1939.

== Selected paintings ==
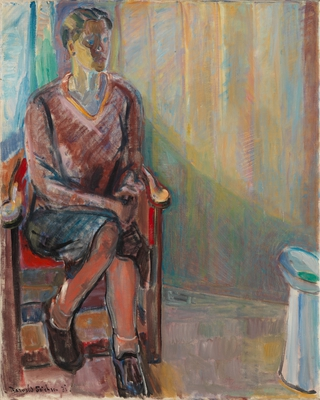
Interior with
Sitting Woman

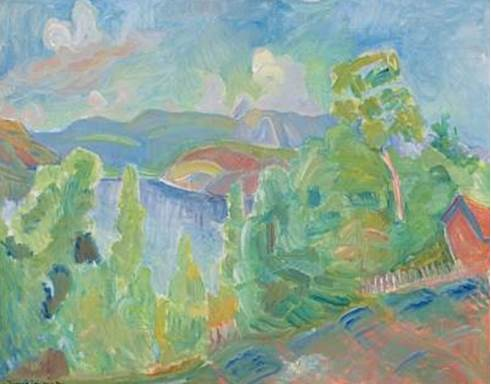
Summer in Holmsbu

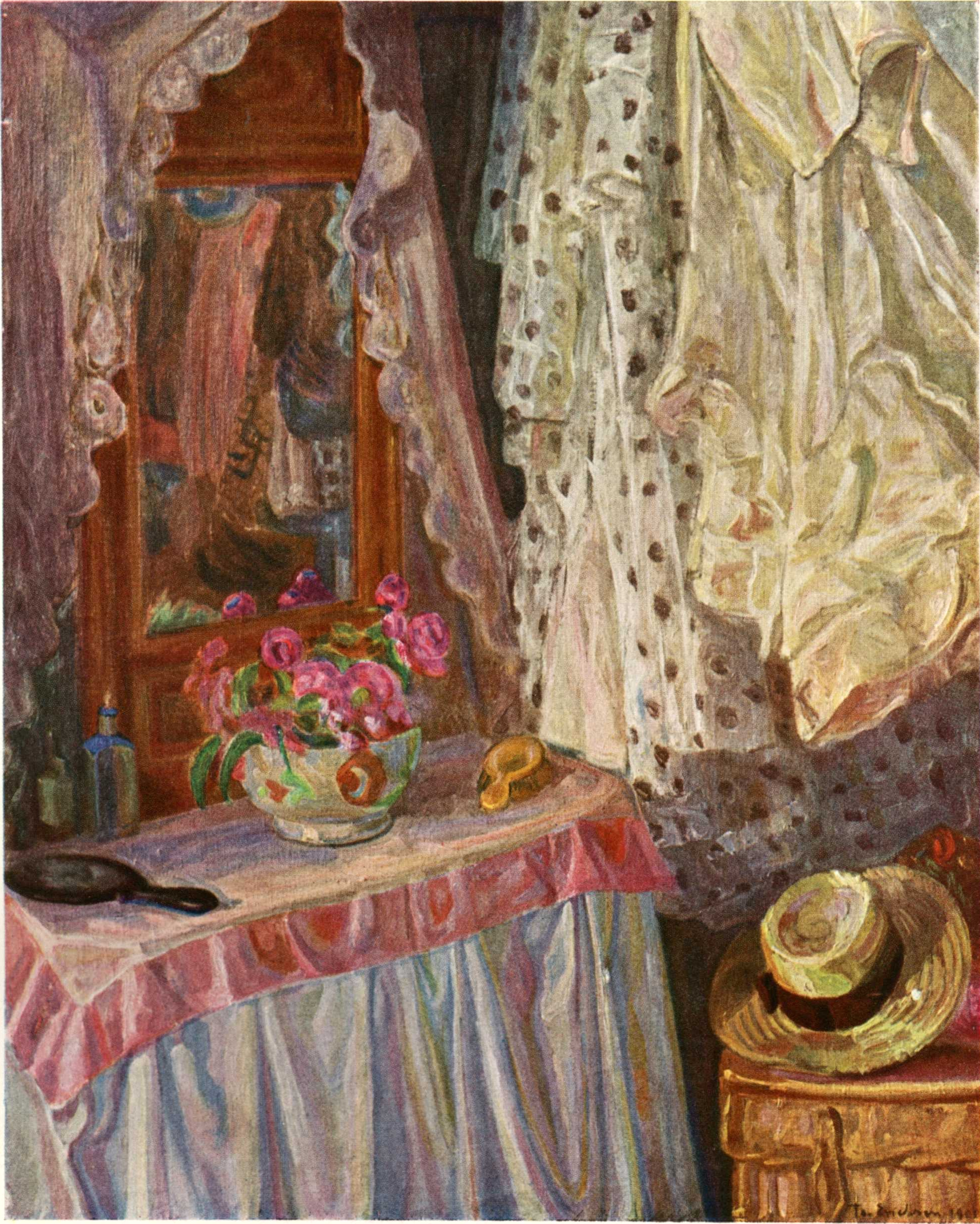
A Young Girl's Room

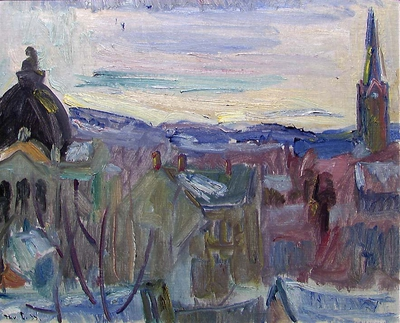
Lillehammer,
Church and Bank

== Other sources ==
- Boym, Per Bjarne (1990). Thorvald Erichsen på Lillehammer (Exhibition catalog - Lillehammer bys malerisamling). ISBN 8299204518.
