= Harriet Backer =

Norwegian artist (1845–1932)

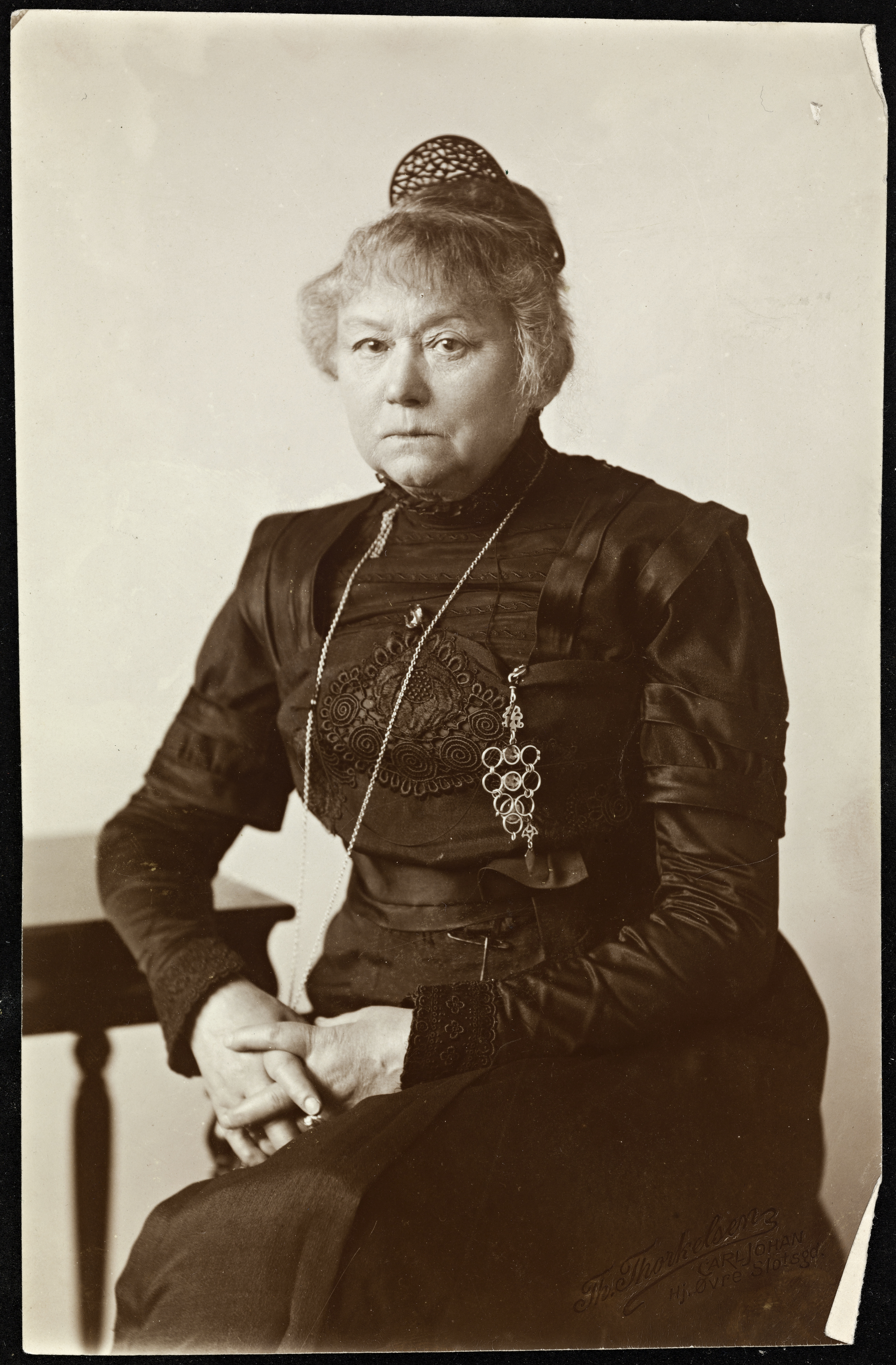
- Born: 21 January 1845; Holmestrand, Norway
- Died: 25 March 1932 (aged 87); Oslo, Norway
- Known for: Painting
- Relatives: Astri Welhaven Heiberg (niece)

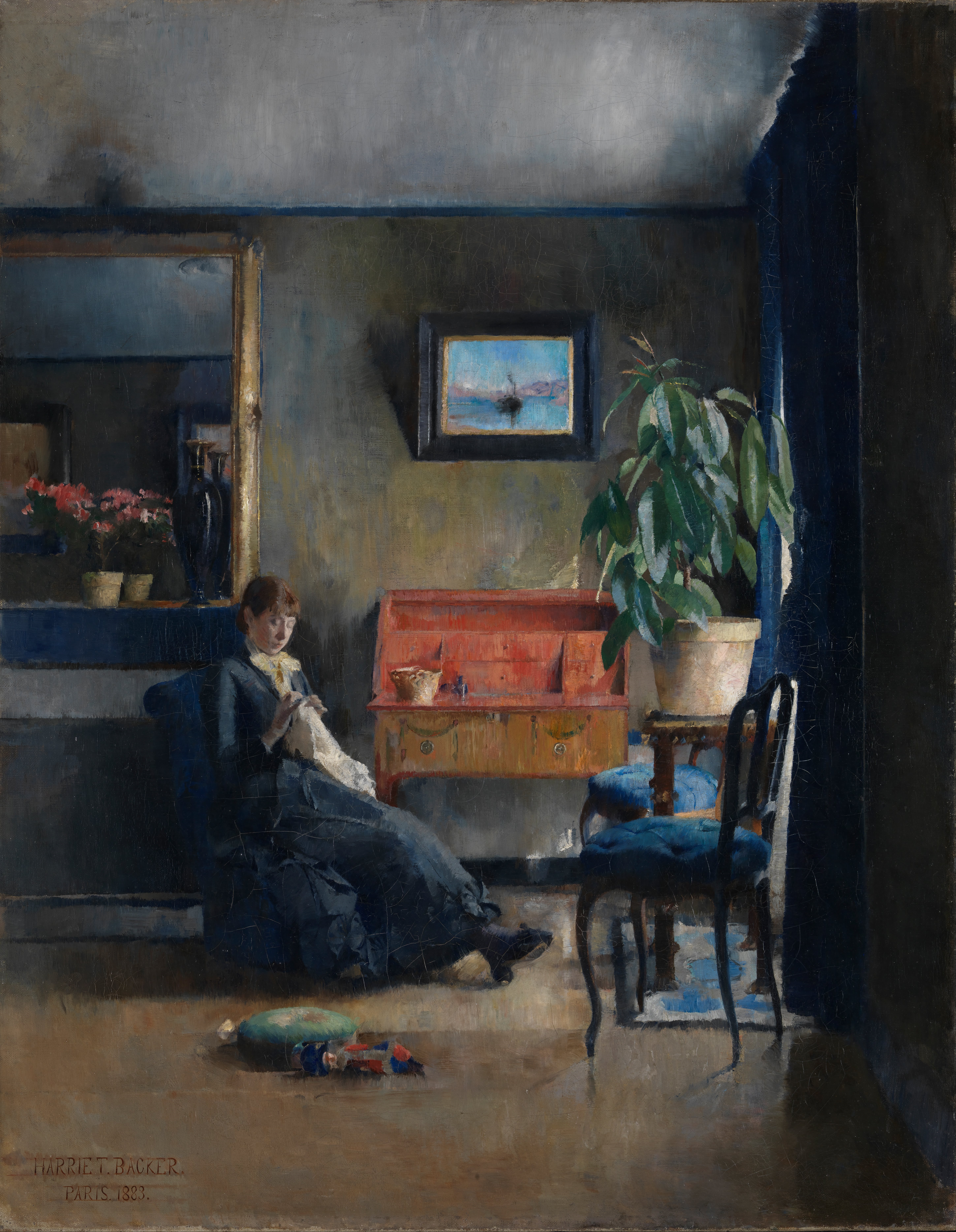
Blått interiør (1883) National Museum

Harriet Backer (21 January 1845 – 25 March 1932) was a Norwegian painter who achieved recognition in her own time and was a pioneer among female artists both in the Nordic countries and in Europe generally. She is best known for her detailed interior scenes, communicated with rich colors and the interplay of light and shadow.

== Biography ==
Backer was one of four daughters born to an affluent family at Holmestrand in Vestfold, Norway. Her parents were Nils Backer (1815–1877) and Sofie Smith Petersen (1819–1882), and she was the aunt of the painter Astri Welhaven Heiberg (1881–1967). Her father was a shipping merchant and her mother was from a wealthy family. Her family moved to Christiania (Oslo) in 1856.

She attended Wilhemine Autentrieth Girls' School (1857–1860) and Hartvig Nissen School (1863). At 12, she first took lessons in drawing and painting, notably with Joachim Calmeyer (1857). She studied with art instructor Johan Fredrik Eckersberg (1861–65), in Berlin with Alphons Holländer (1866–1867), with Christen Brun (1867–1868) and attended the painting school of Knud Bergslien (1871–74). Later, she was a student of Eilif Peterssen at the Academy of Fine Arts, Munich (1874–1878), and of Léon Bonnat and Jean-Léon Gérôme in Paris (1878–1880). She also spent a summer in the town of Rochefort-en-Terre in Morbihan, painting with Léon Germain Pelouse, whom she called "the most natural man I have ever met."

Additionally, Backer traveled extensively as a companion to her sister, noted concert pianist Agathe Backer Grøndahl (1847–1907), on her concert tours throughout Europe. She took further lessons in the course of these trips. From 1880 to 1888, she stayed in Paris where she shared a studio with fellow Norwegian artist, Kitty Lange Kielland. She was also associated with Salon Marie Trélat in Paris.

In 1888, Backer moved back to Norway permanently and settled in Sandvika, outside of Christiania. From 1889 until 1912, she operated an art school and was an influence on a number of younger artists including Marie Hauge, Lars Jorde and Henrik Lund. She also gave art lessons to the novelist Cora Sandel.

Backer produced just around 180 works of art mostly based upon local themes. Her work was both slow and thorough. In 1880, she debuted in Paris with the painting Solitude, and in 1883 exhibited Blått interiør at the Autumn Exhibition in Oslo. She was influenced by impressionism. She never belonged to any school but her work is often compared with that of her contemporary Eilif Peterssen (1852–1928). Backer worked in the tradition of realism in painting, where she is regarded as both a naturalist and an early Impressionist.

Backer was awarded the Schäffers legat in 1878, 1879, and 1880. She won a silver medal at the Exposition Universelle (1889). Backer exhibited her work at the Palace of Fine Arts at the 1893 World's Columbian Exposition in Chicago, Illinois. From 1907 until his death in 1925, she received an annual private grant from wealthy industrialist and patron of the arts, Olaf Fredrik Schou (1861-1925). She received the King's Medal of Merit in Gold (Kongens fortjenstmedalje i gull) in 1908. In 1912, she was made a member of Nordlendingenes Forening and was awarded the Petter Dass Metal (Petter Dass-medaljen). In 1925, she was made a Knight 1st class in the Order of St. Olav.

Backer died on 25 March 1932 and was buried at Vår Frelsers gravlund in Oslo. Ada Madssen (1917–2009) designed a bronze statue of Harriet Backer and her sister Agathe Backer Grøndahl which was erected in 1982 in their hometown of Holmestrand. Several of the largest museums and art collections in Norway exhibit art by Backer, including the National Museum in Oslo, Bergen Museum and Rasmus Meyers Collection at the Bergen Kunstmuseum in Bergen. Backer was included in the 2018 exhibit Women in Paris 1850-1900.

== See also ==
- Christening in Tanum Church

== Gallery ==
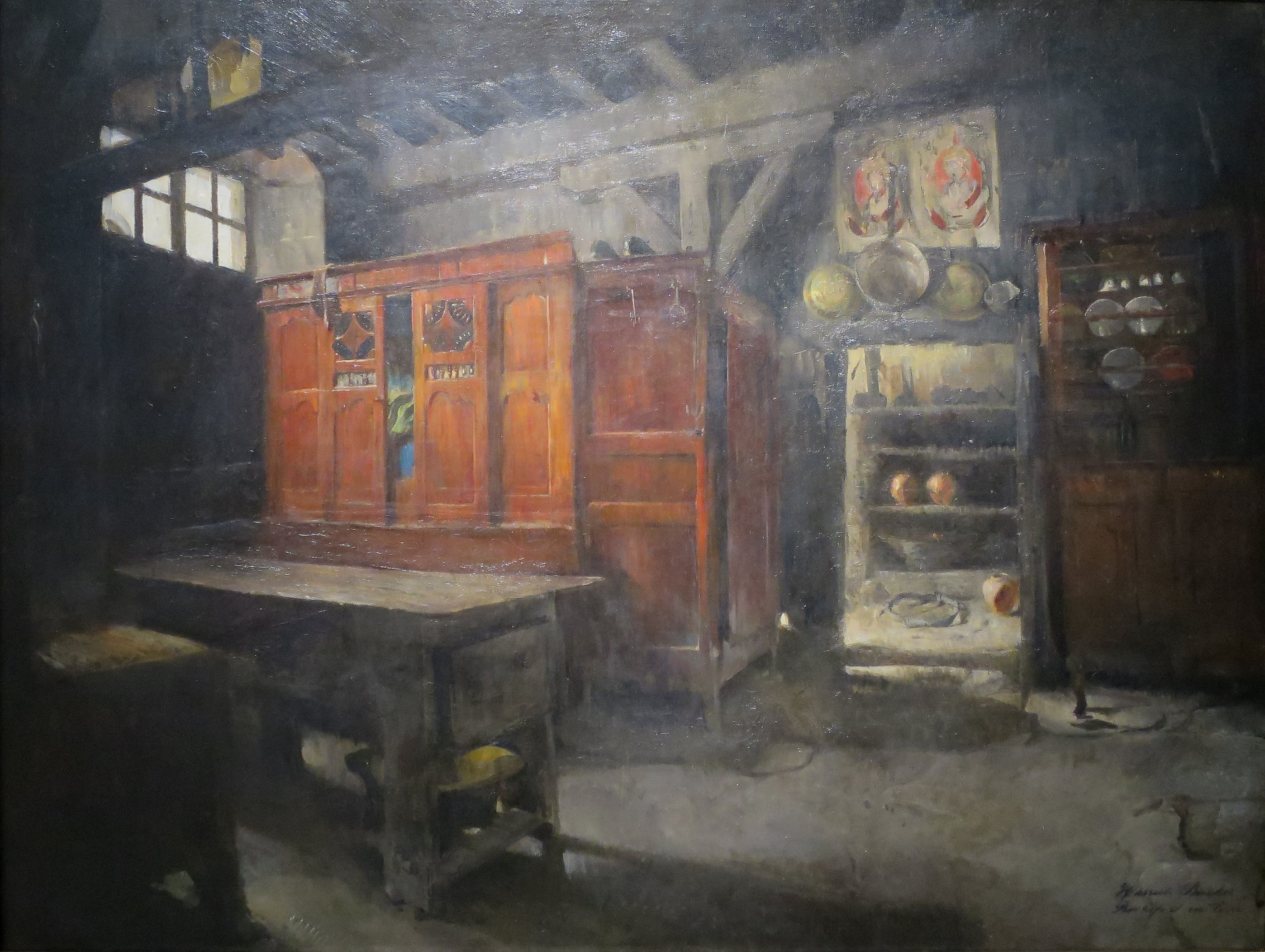
Breton Interior
(1882)

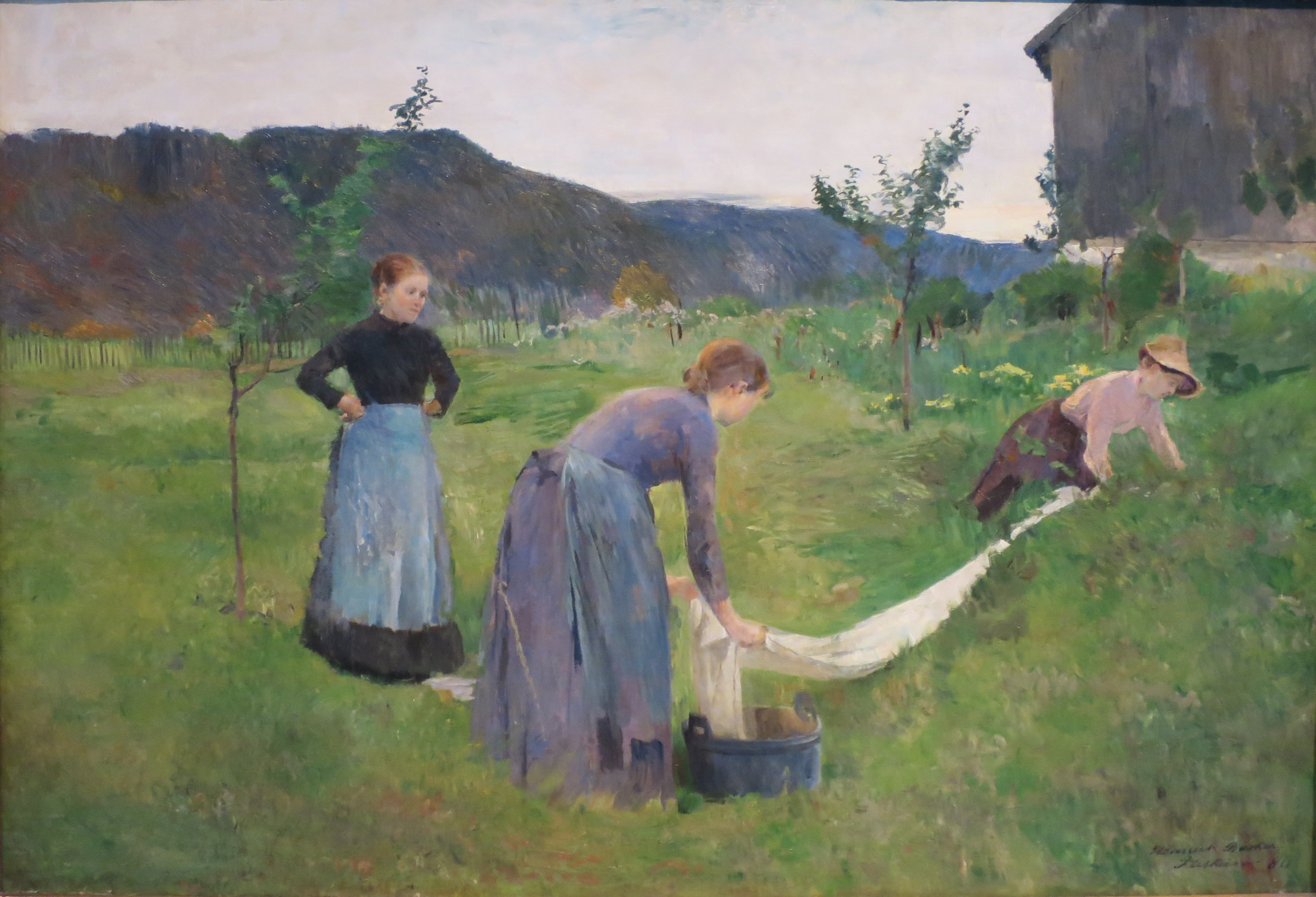
På blekevollen
(1886–87)

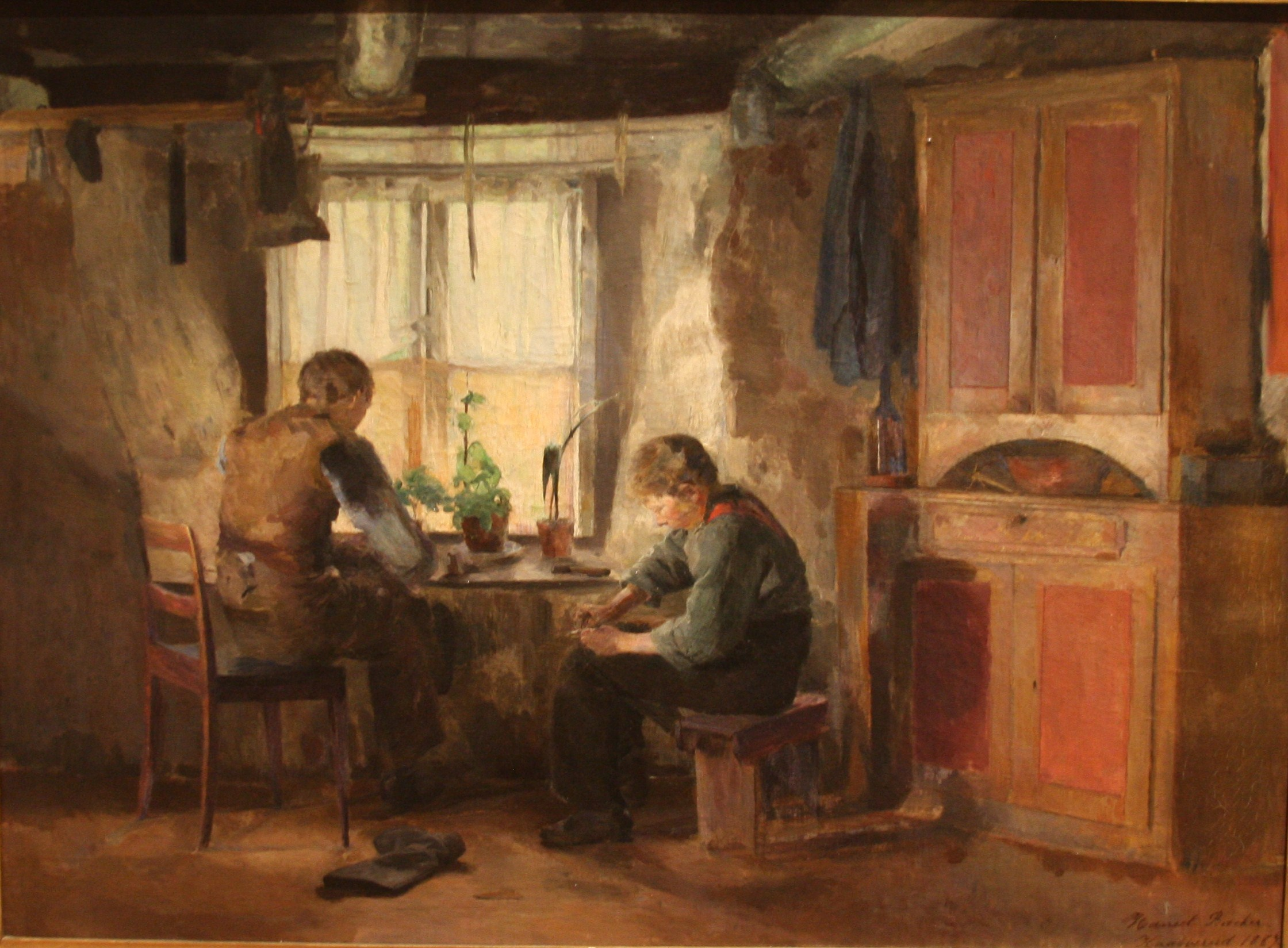
Bygdeskomakere
(1887)

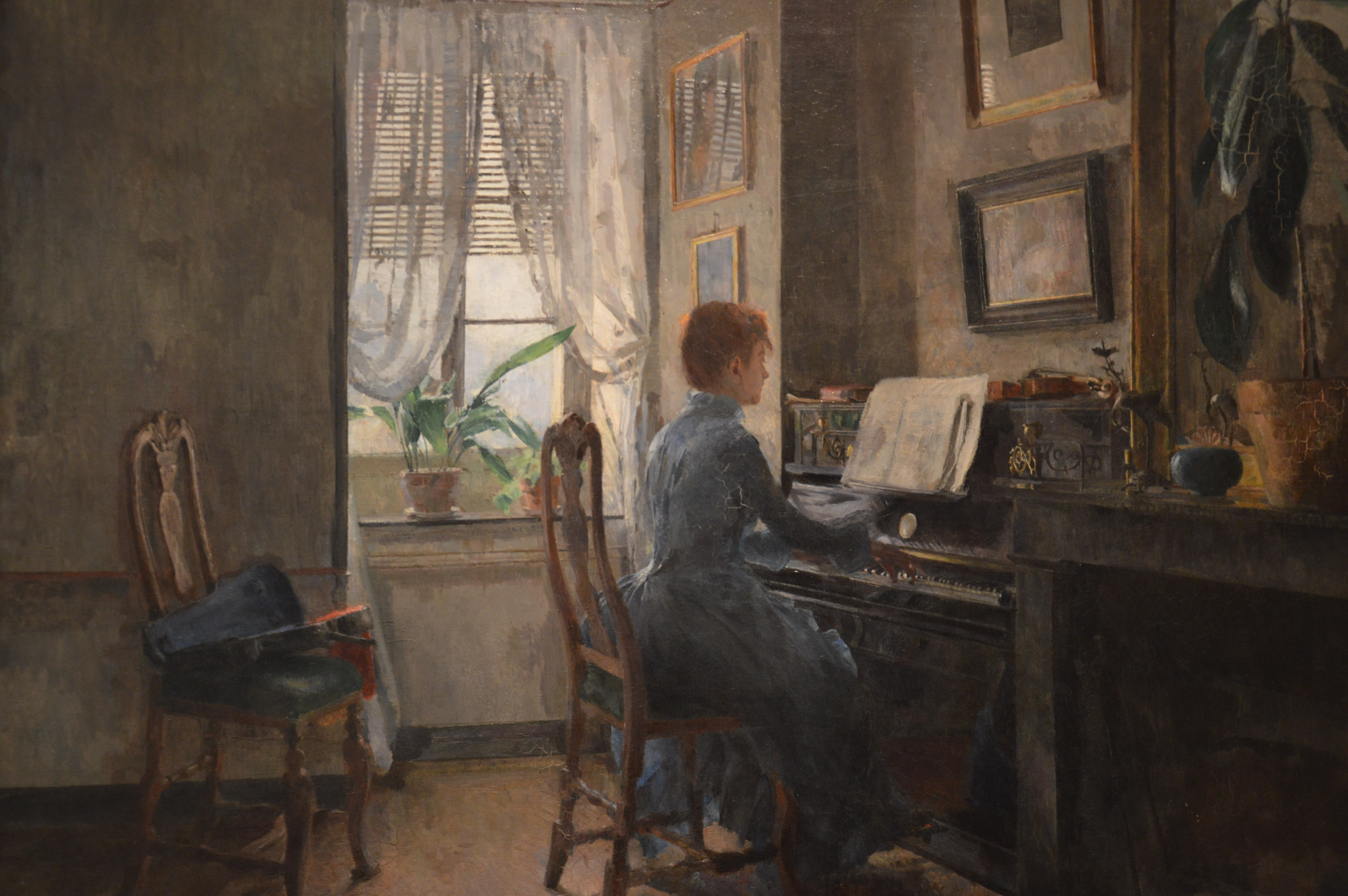
Chez Moi
(1887)

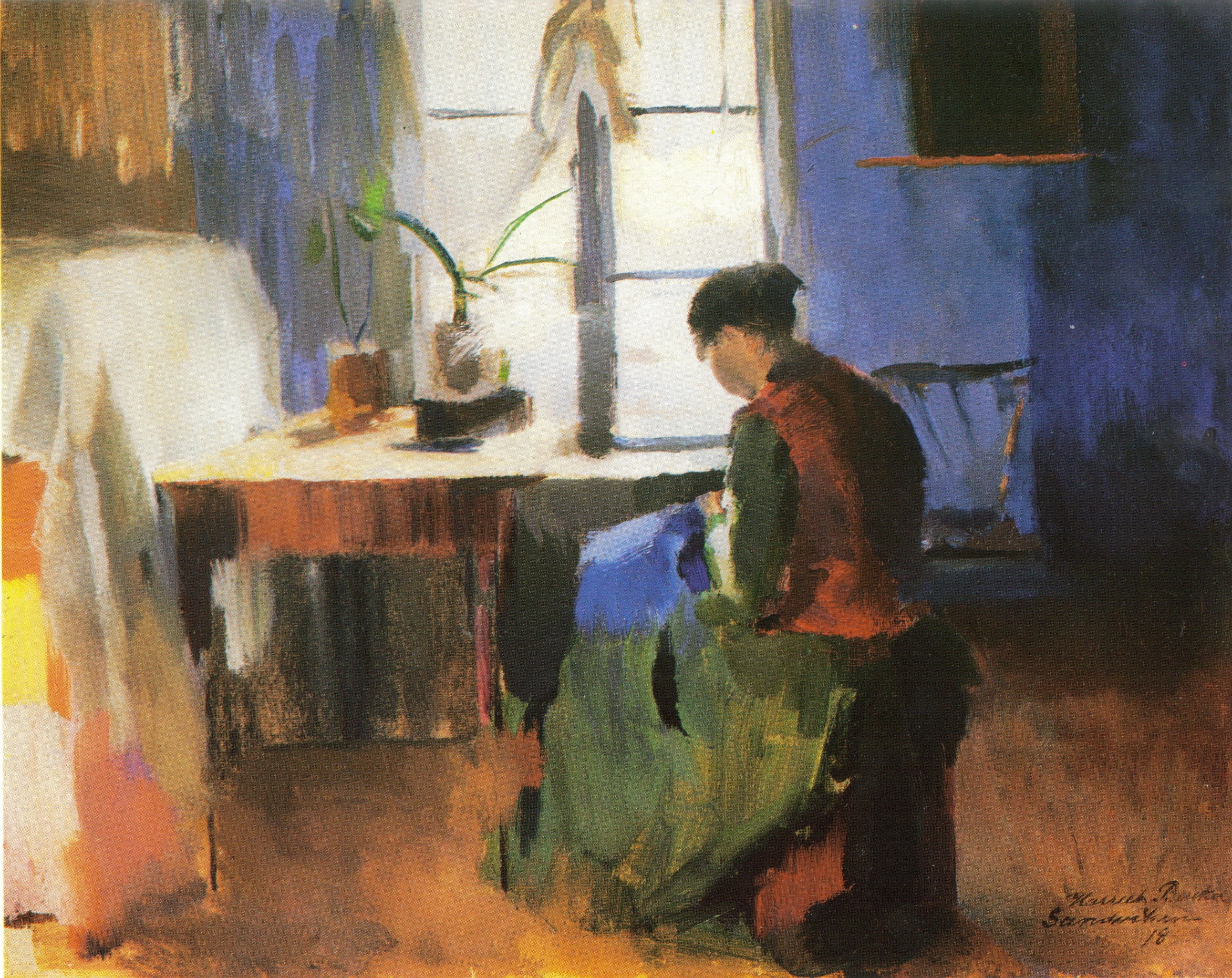
Kone som syr
(1890)

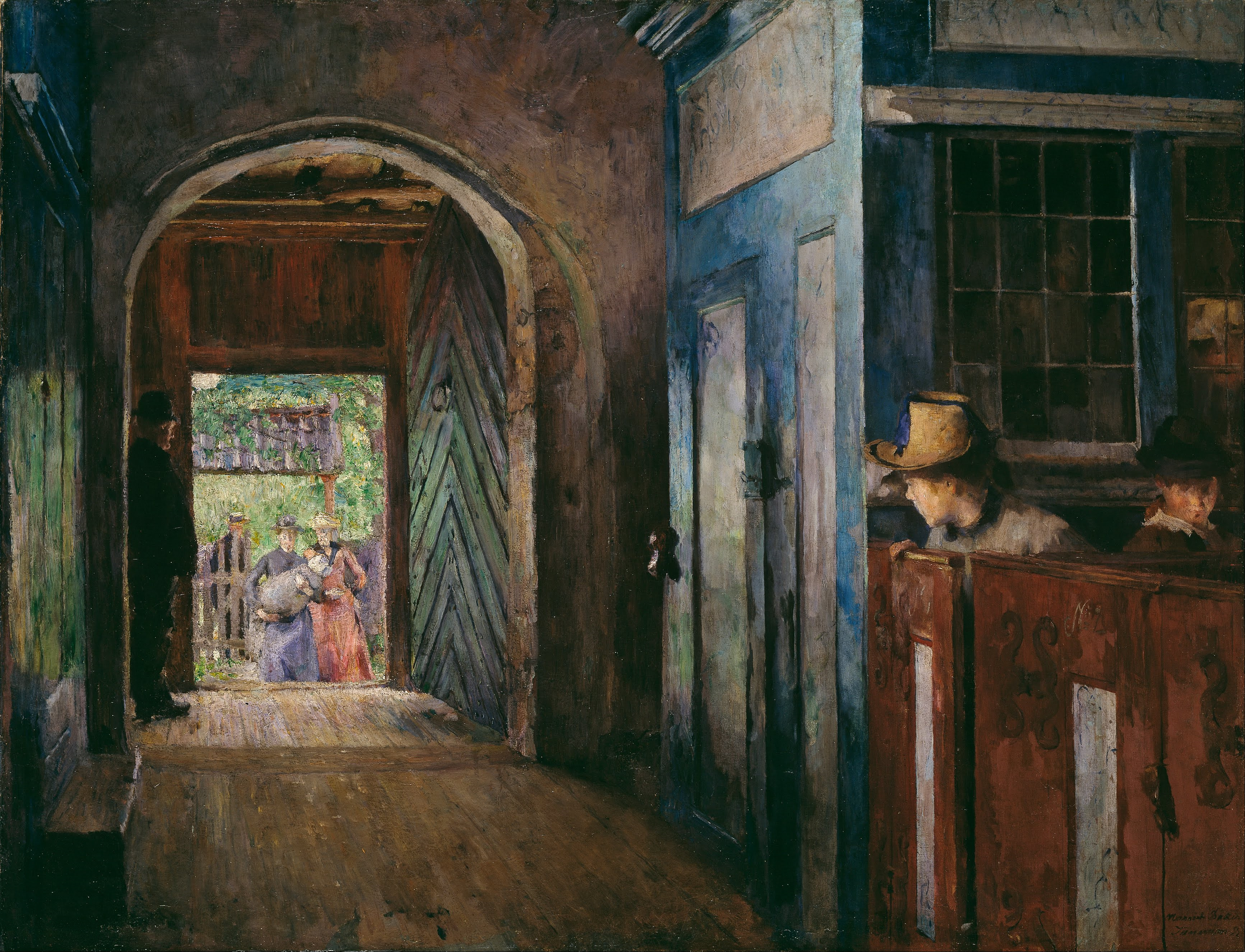
Barnedåp i Tanum kirke
(1892)

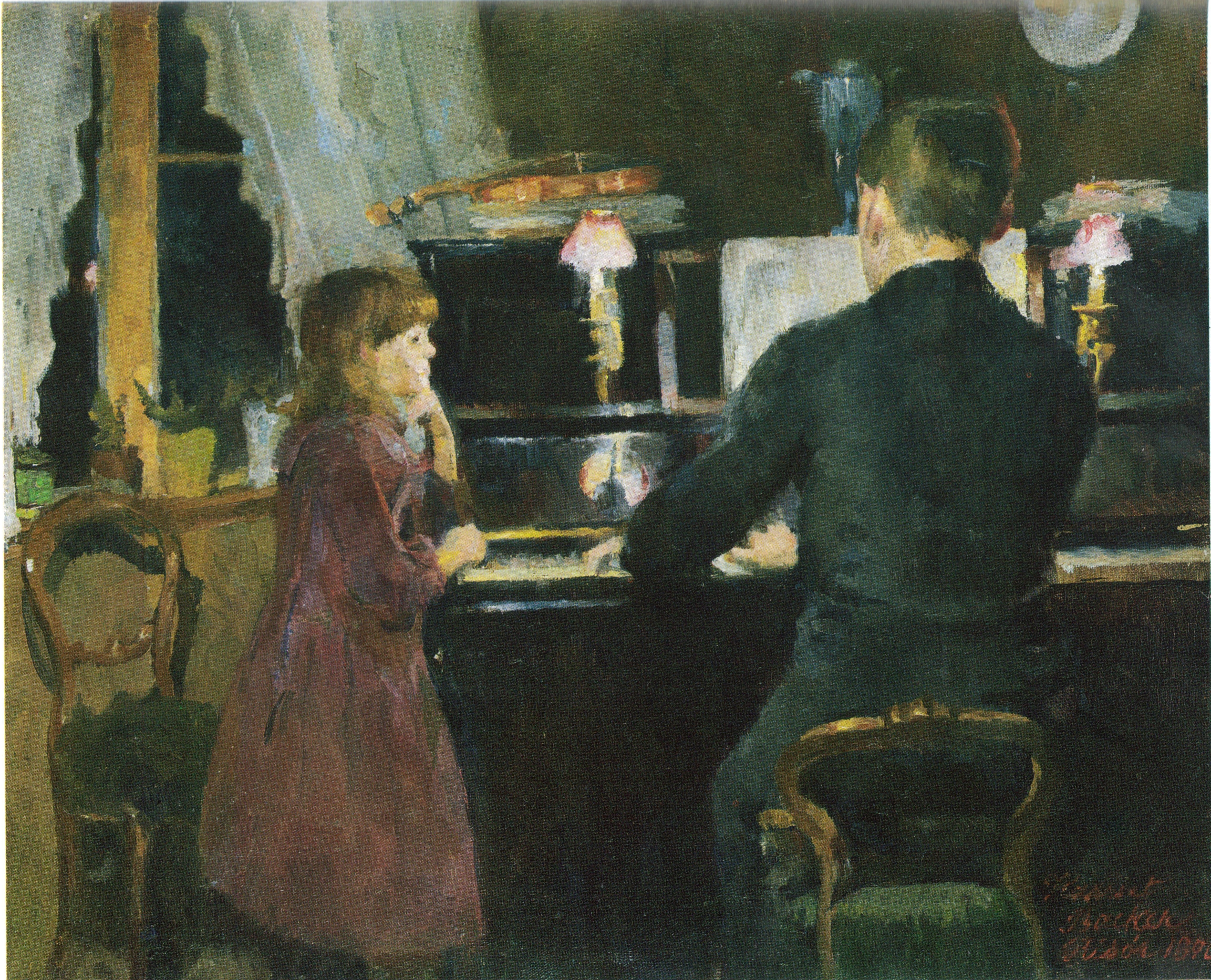
Storebror spiller
(1890)

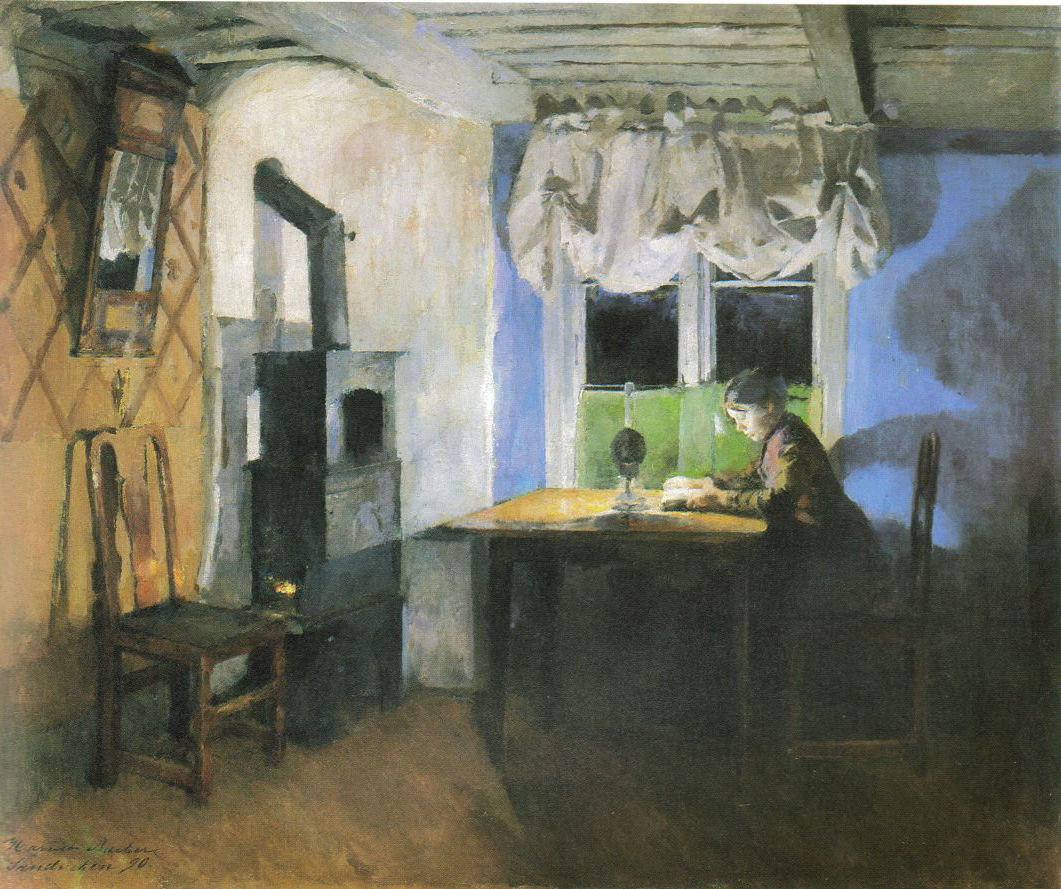
Ved lampelys
(1890)

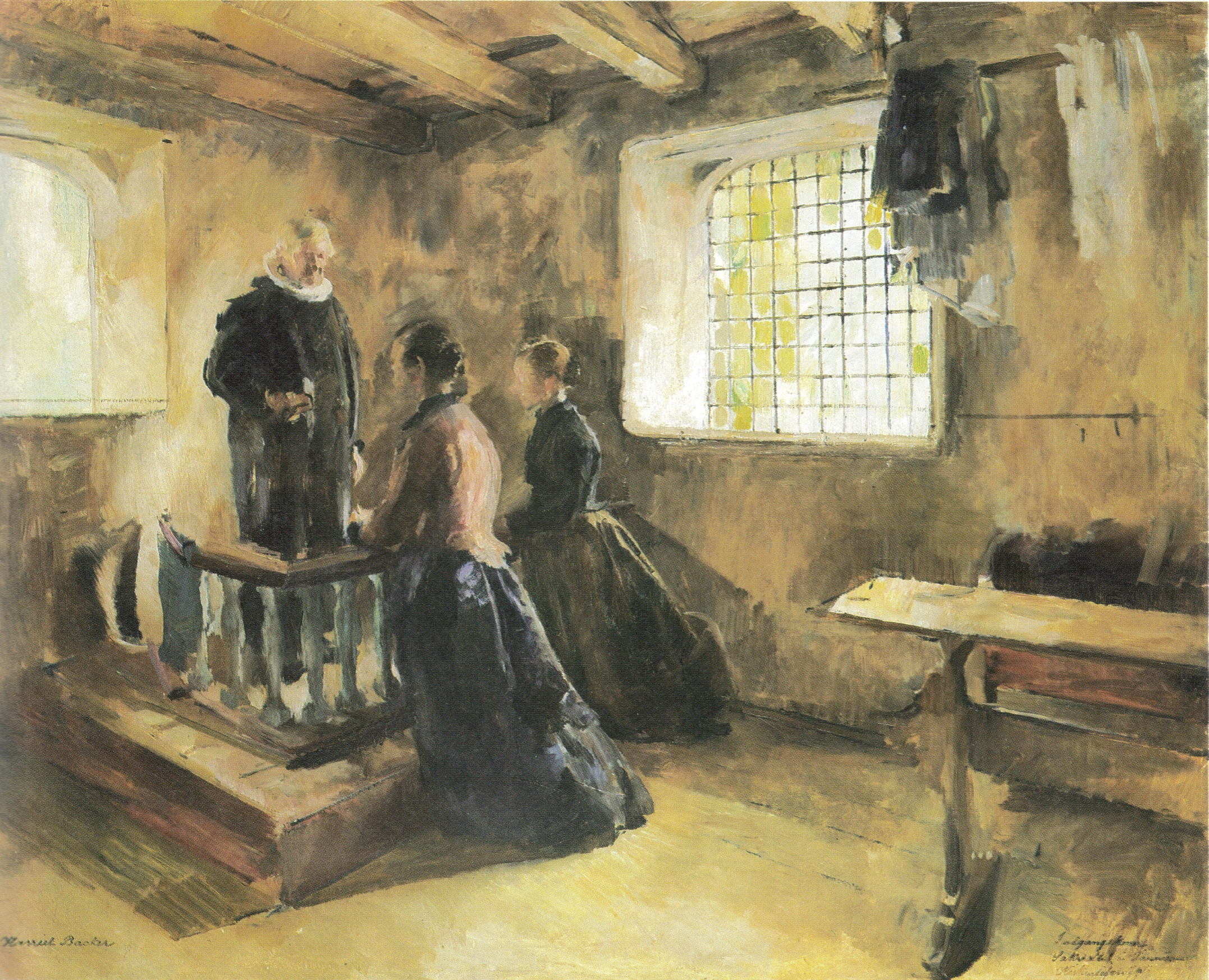
Inngangskoner
(1892)

== Other sources ==
- Brown, Randi (1988) "The Church Interiors of Harriet Backer" (1988) https://alliance-primo.hosted.exlibrisgroup.com/permalink/f/to8ro2/CP71154965950001451
- Lange, Marit Ingeborg (1995) Harriet Backer (Oslo: Gyldendal norsk forlag) ISBN 978-82-05-19301-7
- Lange, Marit Ingeborg (1983) Harriet Backer, 1845-1932, Kitty L. Kielland, 1843-1914 (Stiftelsen Modums blaafarveværk) ISBN 978-82-990568-5-4
- Kielland, Else Christie (1958) Harriet Backer, 1845-1932 (Oslo: Aschehough)
- Durban, Arne (1951) Paintings from Norway: Popular pictures by Harriet Backer, Frits Thaulo, Gerhard Munthe and Theodor Kittelsen (Forlaget Norsk Kunatreproduksjon)
- Lone, Erling (1924) Harriet Backer: med en skildring av barndoms (Kristiania: Aschehoug)
