= Torben =

Torben is a Danish variant of the given name Torbjörn.

People named Torben include:

- Torben Betts (born 1968), English playwright and screenwriter
- Torben Boye (born 1966), Danish former footballer
- Torben Frank (born 1968), Danish former football striker
- Torben Grael (born 1960), Brazilian sailor and twice Olympic gold medalist
- Torben Hoffmann (born 1974), German former football defender
- Torben Joneleit (born 1987), Monegasque-born German footballer
- Torben Larsen (born 1942), Danish scientist in the field of hydrology and water pollution
- Torben Meyer (1884-1975), Danish character actor
- Torben Nielsen (born 1945), Danish former football player and manager
- Torben Oxe (died 1517), Danish nobleman controversially executed for murder
- Torben Piechnik (born 1963), Danish former football defender
- Torben Schousboe (1937–2017), Danish music researcher and writer
- Torben Skovlyst, Danish orienteering competitor

== See also ==
- Torbern Bergman (1735-1784), Swedish chemist and mineralogist
- Turbin
- Thoburn
- Thorburn
- Thulborn
