= Torbjörn =

Torbjörn, Thorbjörn, Torbjørn, or Thorbjørn (given name) are modern Swedish, Norwegian and Danish forms of the Old Norse and Icelandic name Þorbjörn, meaning thunder (from the name Thor) and bear.

Other variants of the name include the Danish/German form Torben and the predominantly German form Thorben. English variants include Thurburn, Thorburn, Thubron,Thubron, Thorbern, Thorebern, Thorber, and Thurber, which are, however, normally used as surnames. Tubby is common in the Norfolk area of England and the early whaling communities of North America.

The Icelandic short form is "Tobbi"; the Swedish is "Tobbe." The supposed site of Þorbjörn's farm in Hrafnkels saga was known as "Tobbahól" by the locals.

== Notable people named Torbjörn ==
- Torbjørn Agdestein (born 1991), Norwegian footballer
- Torbjörn Arvidsson (born 1968), Swedish football player
- Torbjörn Axelman (1932–2023), Swedish TV producer, director and writer
- Torbjørn Bergerud (born 1994), Norwegian handball player
- Thorbjørn Berntsen (born 1935), former Norwegian politician representing the Labour Party
- Torbjörn Björlund (born 1957), Swedish politician
- Torbjörn Blomdahl (born 1962), Swedish billiards player
- Torbjörn Blomqvist (1941–2017), Finnish sprint canoer
- Torbjørn Bratt ( c.1502 – 1548), Norwegian clergyman
- Torbjørn Brundtland (born 1975), band member of the Norwegian electronic music duo, Röyksopp
- Torbjörn Caspersson (1910–1997), Swedish cytologist and geneticist
- Torbjørn Clausen (1931–2001), Norwegian boxer
- Þorbjörn dísarskáld, late-10th century Icelandic skald (poet)
- Knut Torbjørn Eggen (1960–2012), Norwegian football coach and player
- Thorbjørn Egner (1912–1990), Norwegian playwright, songwriter and illustrator
- Torbjörn Ek (1949–2010), Swedish bandy- and soccer player
- Torbjörn Eriksson (born 1971), Swedish athlete
- Torbjörn Evrell (1920–2008), Swedish inventor and businessman
- Thorbjörn Fälldin (1926–2016), Swedish politician
- Thorbjørn Feyling (1907–1985), Norwegian ceramist, Head of design at Stavangerflint AS
- Torbjörn Flygt (born 1964), Swedish novelist
- Thorbjørn Frydenlund (1892–1989), Norwegian wrestler
- Torbjørn Gaarder (1885–1970), Norwegian chemist
- Thorbjørn Gjølstad (1942–2015), Norwegian jurist and civil servant
- Óli Þorbjörn Guðbjartsson (born 1935), Icelandic politician and former minister
- Torbjørn Hansen (born 1972), Norwegian politician
- Thorbjørn Harr (born 1974), Norwegian actor
- Torbjørn Heggem (born 1999), Norwegian footballer
- Halvor Thorbjørn Hjertvik (1914–1995), Norwegian politician for the Christian Democratic Party
- Þorbjörn Hornklofi, 9th-century Norwegian skald, court poet of King Harald Fairhair
- Torbjörn Hultman (born 1937), Swedish rear admiral
- Thorbjørn Jagland (born 1950), Norwegian politician from Norwegian Labour Party
- Þorbjörn Jensson (born 1953), Icelandic former handball player
- Torbjörn Johansson (born 1970), Swedish middle-distance runner
- Torbjörn Jonsson (1936–2018), Swedish footballer
- Kjell Thorbjørn Kristensen (1927–1995), Norwegian politician for the Labour Party
- Torbjørn Kristoffersen (1892–1986), Norwegian gymnast
- Thorbjørn Kultorp (1929–2004), Norwegian politician for the Labour Party
- Thorbjørn Lie (1943–2006), Norwegian businessperson, politician for the Progress Party
- Torbjörn "Ebbot" Lundberg (born 1966), Swedish artist, songwriter and music producer
- Torbjørn Løkken (born 1963), Norwegian Nordic combined skier
- Torbjörn Martin (born 1981), Swedish film and music video director
- Thorbjorn N. Mohn (1844–1899), American Lutheran church leader, president of St. Olaf College
- Torbjörn Nilsson (born 1954), soccer player
- Thorbjørn Olesen (born 1989), Danish golfer
- Thorbjørn Holst Rasmussen (born 1987), former Danish footballer
- Torbjörn "Pugh" Rogefelt (1947–2023), Swedish singer, musician, guitarist and songwriter
- Thorbjørn Schierup (born 1990), Danish Olympic sailor
- Thorbjørn Schwarz aka DJ Static, Danish DJ, producer, event organizer
- Torbjørn Sindballe (born 1976), Danish triathlete
- Torbjørn Sunde (born 1954), Norwegian jazz musician
- Thorbjørn Svenssen (1924–2011), Norwegian footballer
- Torbjörn Tännsjö (born 1946), Swedish philosopher
- Torbjörn Thoresson (born 1959), Swedish sprint canoer
- Thorbjorn Thorsteinsson, pirate from the Orkney Islands, executed in 1158
- Torbjørn Urfjell (born 1977), Norwegian politician for the Socialist Left Party
- Torbjørn Yggeseth (1934–2010), Norwegian ski jumper
- Torbjörn Zetterberg (born 1976), Swedish jazz musician and composer

== Fictional characters ==
- Torbjörn (Overwatch), a character from the 2016 video game

== Mountain ==
- Þorbjörn (mountain) near Grindavík, Reykjanes, Iceland

== Ships ==
- Thorbjørn (icebreaker), large deep sea icebreaker
- MS Thorbjørn, travels between Utøya and Utøykaia, Norway

== See also ==
- Thoburn
- Thulborn
- Turbin
