= Eilif Peterssen =

Norwegian painter (1852–1928)

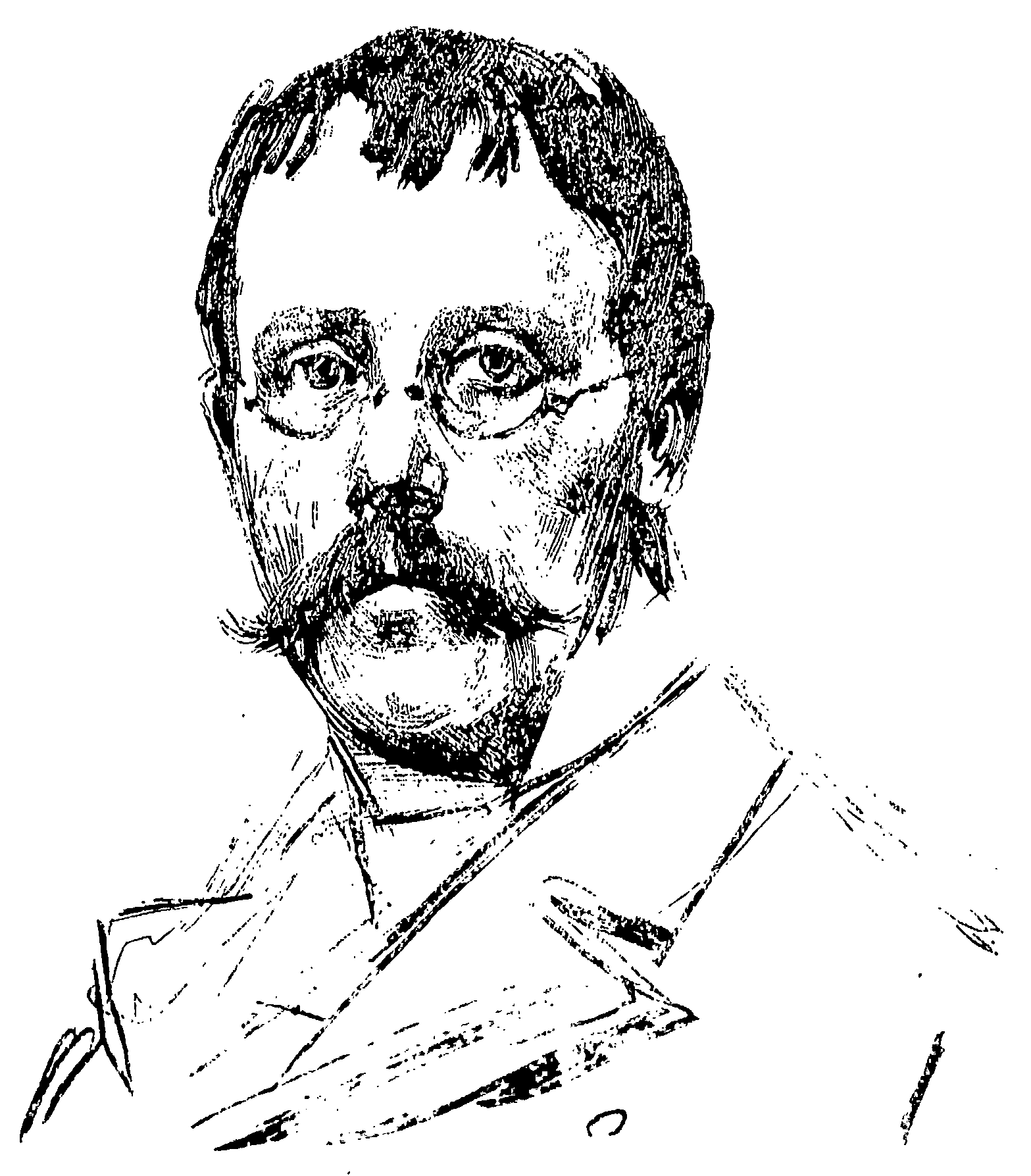
- Born: Hjalmar Eilif Emanuel Peterssen; 4 September 1852; Christiania
- Died: 29 December 1928; Lysaker
- Education: Royal Danish Academy of Fine Arts
- Occupations: Painter, drawer
- Awards: Knight of the Order of St. Olav (1887); Commander of the Order of St. Olav (1905); Knight Officer of the Order of the Polar Star

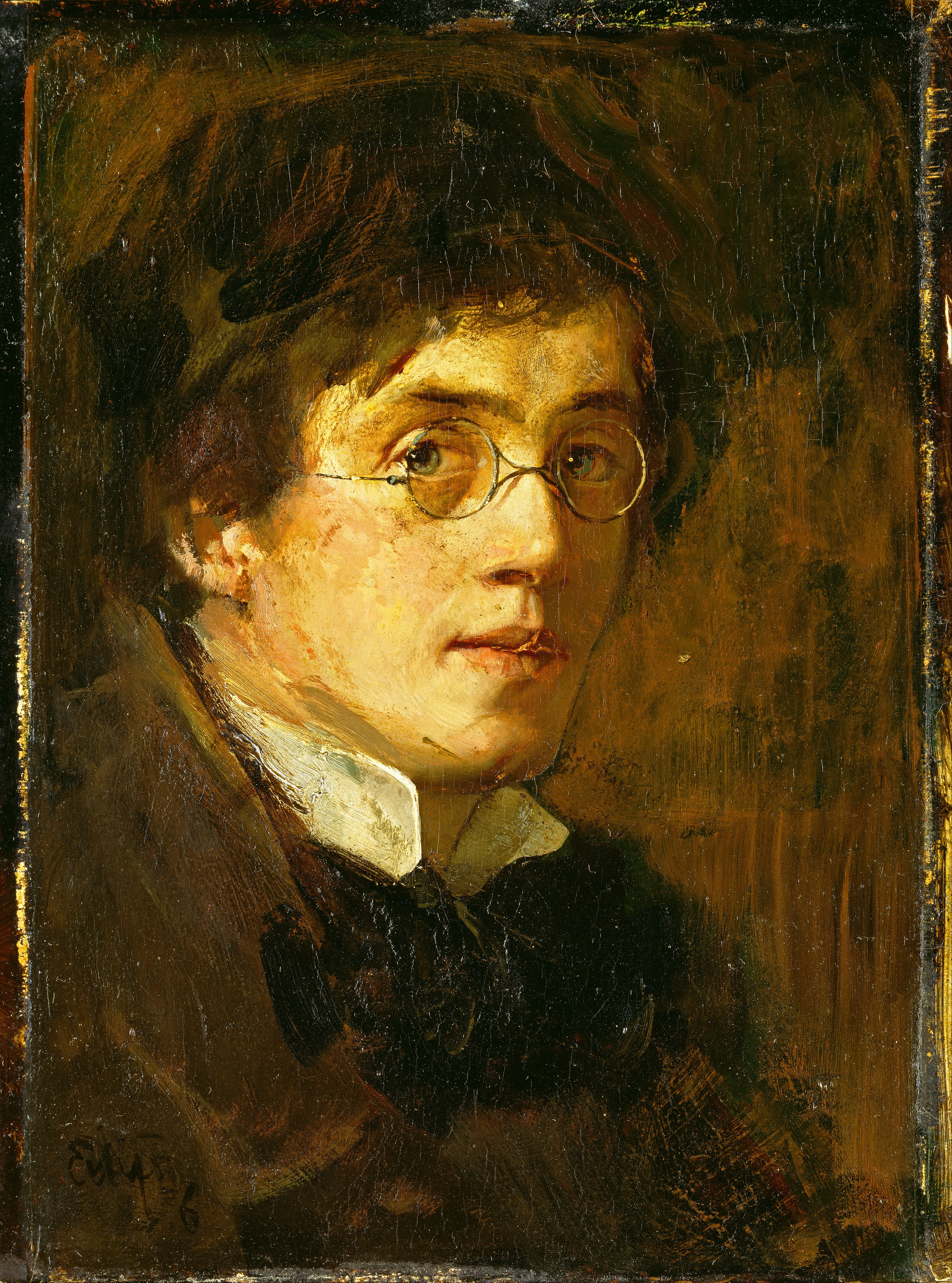
Eilif Peterssen self-portrait (1876)

Hjalmar Eilif Emanuel Peterssen (4 September 1852 – 29 December 1928) was a Norwegian painter. He is most commonly associated with his landscapes and portraits. He gained early recognition for the history painting Christian II signing the Death Warrant of Torben Oxe and established himself as one of Norway's foremost portrait painters, with portraits of, among others, Henrik Ibsen and Edvard Grieg. He also became known for his landscape paintings, and became part of the artist circle known as the Skagen Painters. He also became known for his design in 1905 of Norway's national coat of arms with the Norwegian lion, which was used by the government and the royal house. The design is still used in the royal coat of arms and the royal flag.

== Biography ==
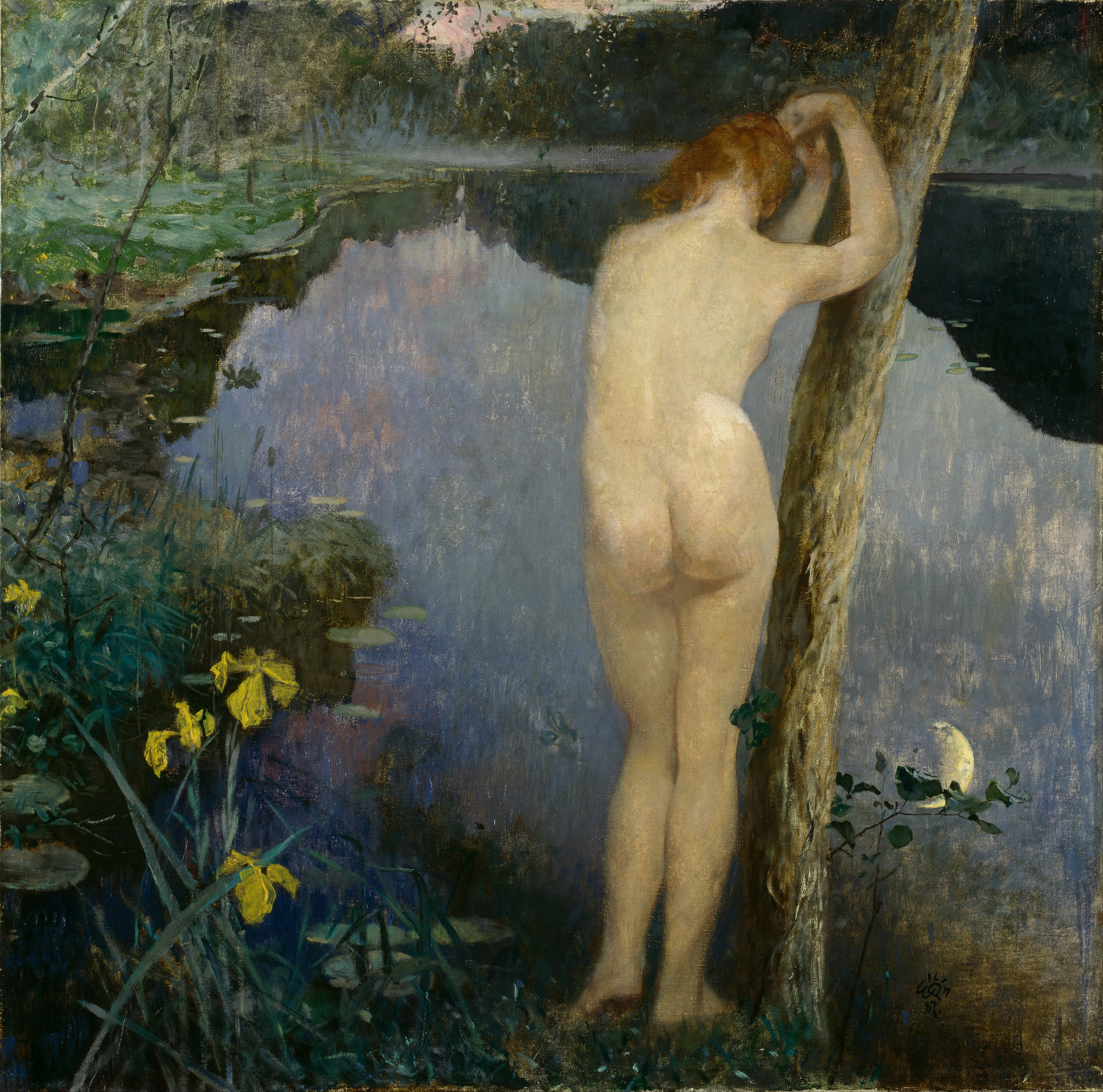
Nocturne (1887)

Hjalmar Eilif Emanuel Peterssen was born in Christiania, now Oslo, Norway. He was the son of Jon Peterssen (1814–1880) and Anne Marie Andersen (1812–1887). He grew up in the neighborhood of Hegdehaugen in the district of Frogner.

He attended the Norwegian National Academy of Craft and Art Industry (Statens håndverks- og kunstindustriskole) in Christiania from 1866–1870. He entered the Johan Fredrik Eckersberg School of Painting in 1869. He trained with Knud Bergslien and Morten Müller in the autumn of 1870. In 1871 he left Oslo to study at the Royal Danish Academy of Fine Arts in Copenhagen. Later that year he moved to Karlsruhe, where he was a student of Ludwig des Coudres at the Academy of Fine Arts, Karlsruhe and Wilhelm Riefstahl at Weimar Saxon-Grand Ducal Art School. In the fall of 1873 Peterssen traveled to Munich where he studied at the Academy of Fine Arts, Munich under Wilhelm von Diez and Franz von Lenbach. In Munich Peterssen met other famous artists such as Arnold Böcklin and Karl von Piloty.

Peterssen made several trips to France and Italy. In 1896 he went to Arques-la-Bataille in Normandy, where he painted several landscapes, and from France he went together with his family to Rome in 1897. In 1903, Peterssen again visited Italy and in Rapallo near Genova, he painted the impressionist motif Winter in the South (Washerwomen in Rapallo). During the dissolution of Union between Sweden and Norway in 1905, Peterssen was commissioned to design the new coat of arms of Norway.

In his later years Peterssen travelled all over Norway to paint landscapes. He made several visits to Skogstad in Valdres, where he was particularly inspired by the great mountain landscape. In 1920–21, he made his last travel abroad to Cagnes-sur-Mer and Saint-Paul-de-Vence in Provence where he painted several landscapes of the small villages on the hills between Nice and Cannes.

== Career ==
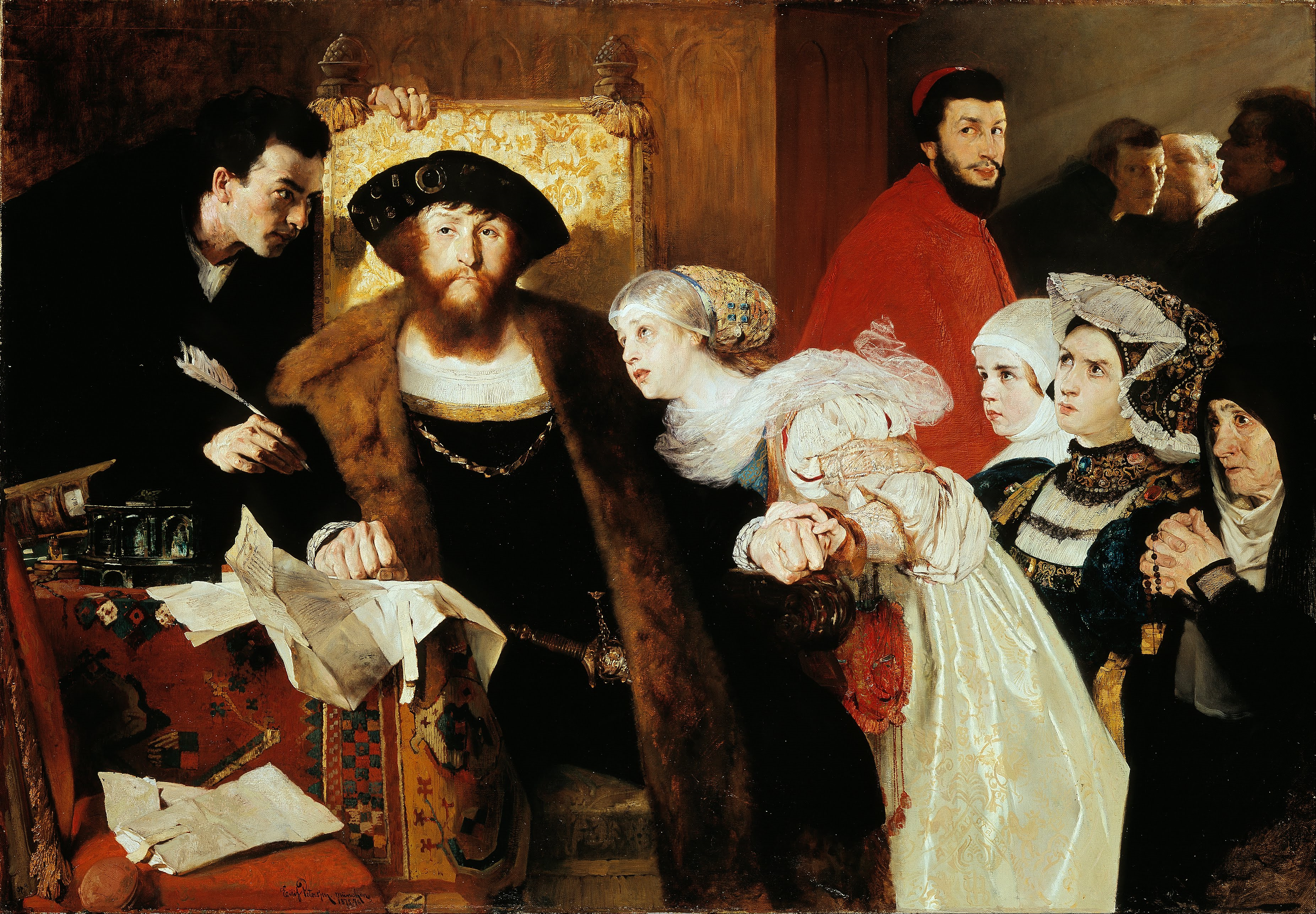
Christian II signing the Death Warrant of Torben Oxe (1875–76)

Peterssen made his breakthrough as a painter in Munich with the history painting Christian II signing the Death Warrant of Torben Oxe (1876) which was acquired by the Verbindung für historische Kunst in Stuttgart. In Munich, he painted one of his biggest paintings, the altarpiece The Crucifixion (disappeared) for Johannes Church (Johanneskirken) in Oslo which was demolished in 1928. Later he was to paint nine more altarpieces and a church decoration, The Ascension (1908–1909) in Ullern Church in Oslo.

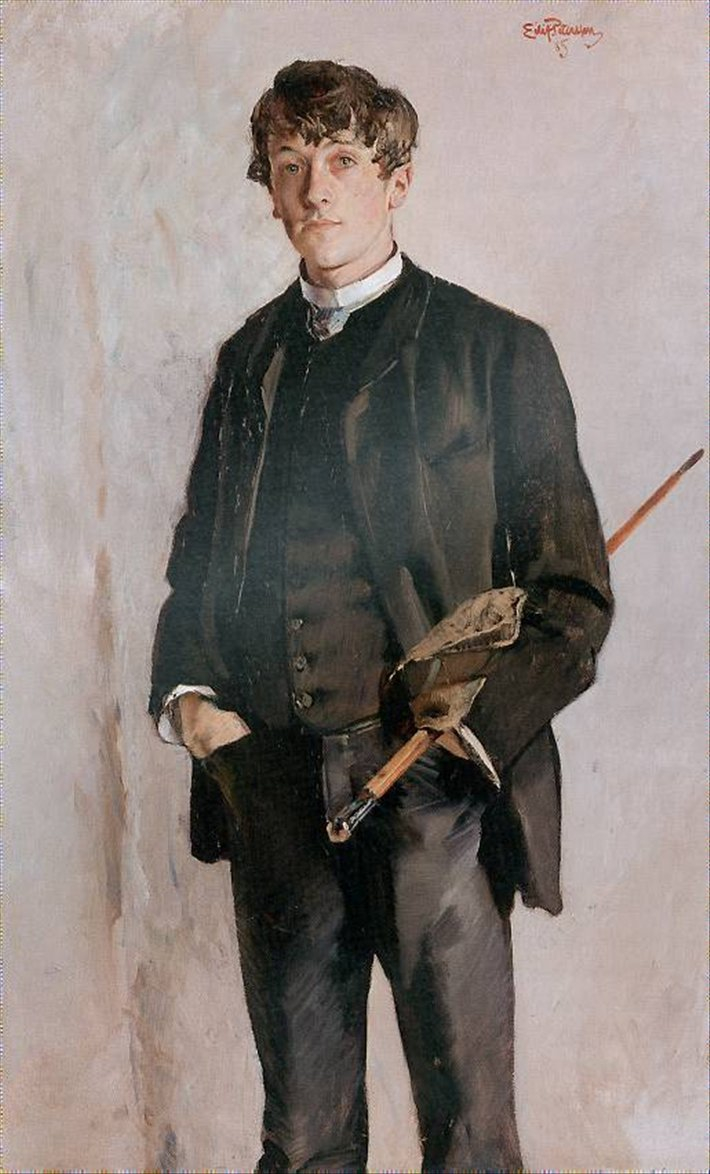
Portrait of Kalle Løchen (1885)

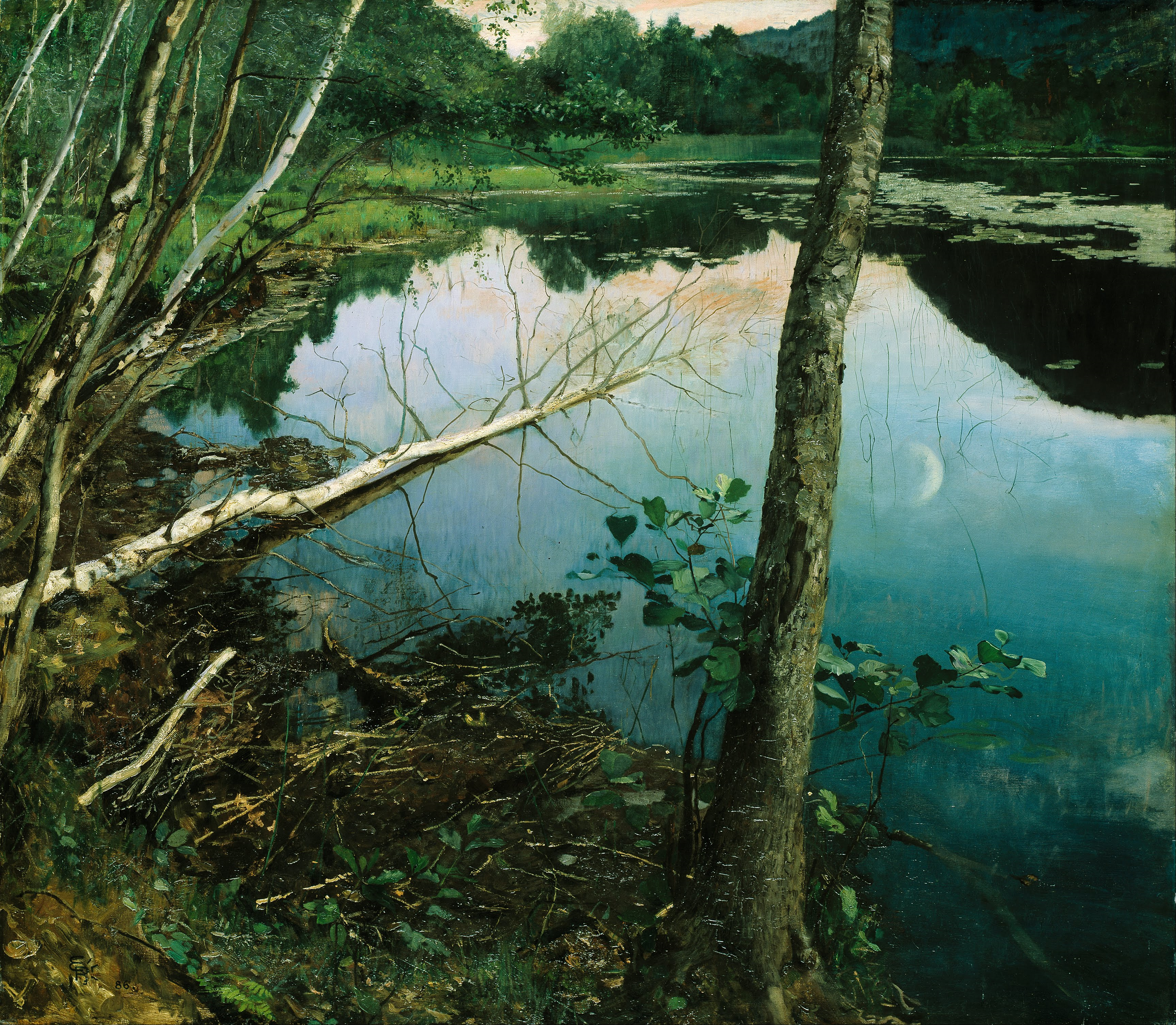
Summer Night (1886)

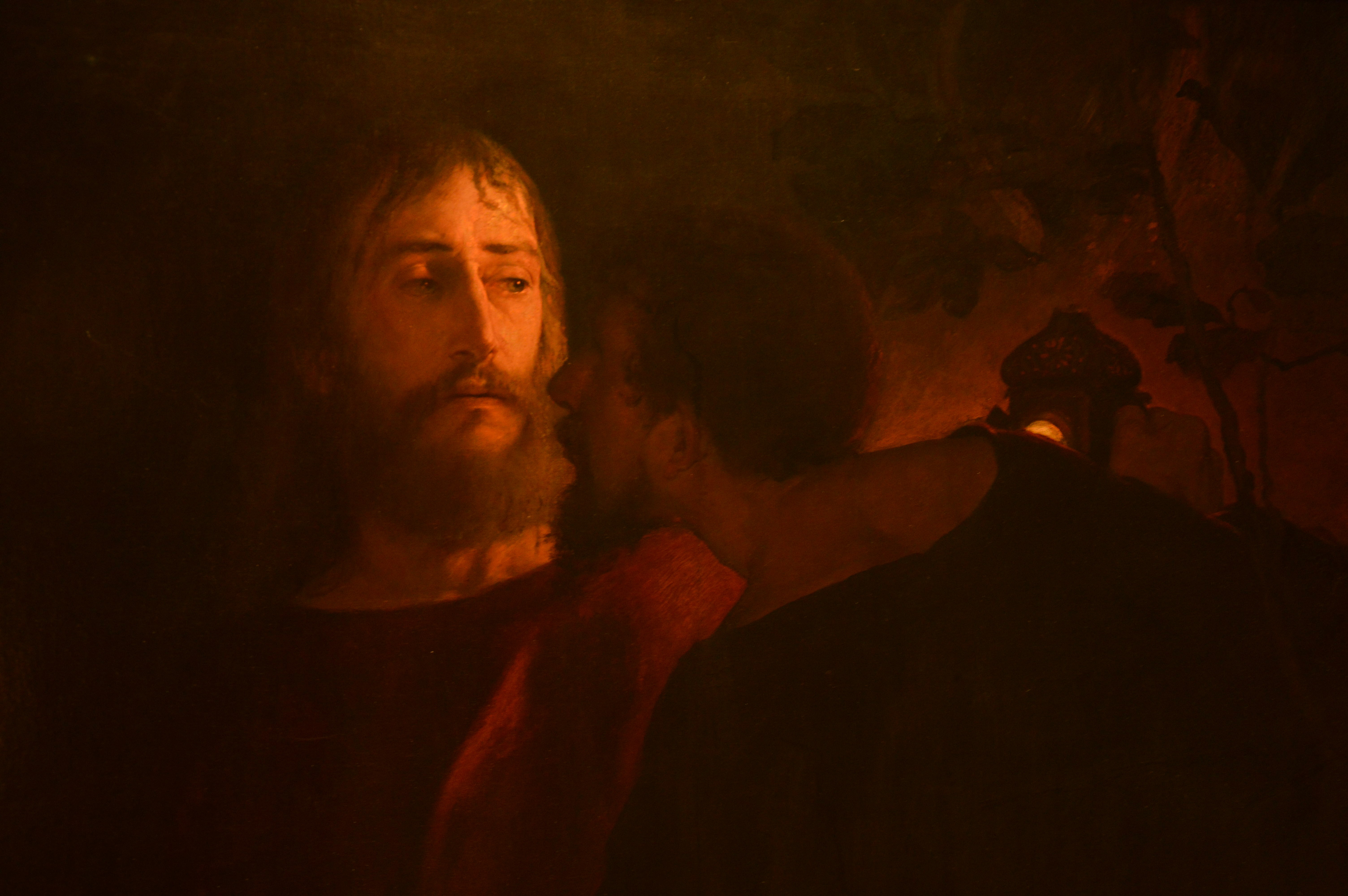
Judas Iscariot (1878)

Peterssen is also known for his portraits. In Munich he painted some of his best portraits, of artist friends such as Harriet Backer and Hans Heyerdahl and of the German painters Anton Windmaier and Adolf Heinrich Lier. He painted Princess Anna Elisabeth Reuss at Schloss Schleiz in Gera during 1878.

Peterssen was influenced by the brownish palette of the Munich School painters. However Peterssen was soon to adopt the increasingly popular En plein air style when he traveled to Italy in 1879. He visited Sora in 1880 together with the Danish painter Peder Severin Krøyer, and in this mountain village he painted his great naturalistic work Siesta in an osteria in Sora. A sharp realism is characteristic of his big canvas Piazza Montanara (1883) painted in Rome.

After the death of his first wife Nicoline in 1882, Peterssen visited Skagen in Denmark together with a group of Danish, Swedish and Norwegian artist friends, among them P.S. Krøyer, Michael and Anna Ancher, Christian Krohg and Oscar Bjørck in the summer of 1883. At Skagen, Peterssen painted some of his first evocative landscapes, such as Summer Evening at Skagen (1883). In the summer of 1884 Peterssen stayed at Sandø, a small island in the Oslofjord, where he painted several versions of Summer Evening, Sandø. These paintings with a contemplative woman sitting in the foreground would influence the famous Norwegian painter Edvard Munch in his later "Melancholy" paintings.

During a visit to Venice in 1885 together with the Norwegian painter Frits Thaulow, Peterssen painted some of his most impressionistic paintings, such as Canal Grande and From Riva degli Schiavoni. These paintings are clearly influenced by French painters, particularly Manet and Monet. But it was on his return to Norway in 1886 that Peterssen painted his most famous evocative landscapes, Summer Evening and Nocturne (1887). Summer Evening has been shown in many exhibitions abroad, among them the "Northern Light" exhibition in America in 1982–1983.

Peterssen continued to paint portraits of famous Norwegians, among them authors Alexander Kielland (1887) (whose cousin Magda he married in 1888), Arne Garborg (1894) and Henrik Ibsen (1895), whom he had painted as early as 1875. He also made a portrait of the well-known composer Edvard Grieg in 1893. Peterssen made a success at the World Exhibition in Paris in 1889 with Salmon Fishermen at Nesøya, a painting combining the evocative and the naturalistic painting style. This was followed by landscape paintings and motifs of salmon fishermen at Jæren in the southern part of Norway where Peterssen stayed in the summertime in the small village of Sele.

During the 1890s Peterssen made several paintings influenced by Impressionism, among them the most important is Sunshine, Kalvøya (Magda sewing) (1891). This painting made the Swedish art critic Erik Wettergren compare Peterssen with the French Impressionist Berthe Morisot. Another impressionist painting is From Akershus (1893).

Inspired by Symbolist and Pre-Raphaelite art, Peterssen painted a series of pictures with motifs from a mediaeval French legend, Gujamar's Song (1905–1907), for the publisher William Nygaard. He painted another series based on a Norwegian folk song, Rikeball and the Proud Gudbjørg (1911), for the shipping magnate Jørgen Breder Stang. He also painted the historical event when King Christian II signs Torben Oxe's death warrant in 1874-76. The queen is depicted sitting on the king's left hand, imploring him, trying to save Torben Oxe.

== Personal life ==
Eilif Peterssen was first married in 1879 to Inger Birgitte Cecilie Nicoline Bache Ravn (1850–1882), a daughter of the court marshal, Major General Johan Georg Boll Gram (1809–1873). After his wife died, he married for the second time in 1888 to Frederikke Magdalene ("Magda") Kielland (1855–1931), daughter of Lieutenant Commander Jacob Kielland (1825–1889).

He died at Lysaker in Bærum on 29 December 1928.

== Works ==
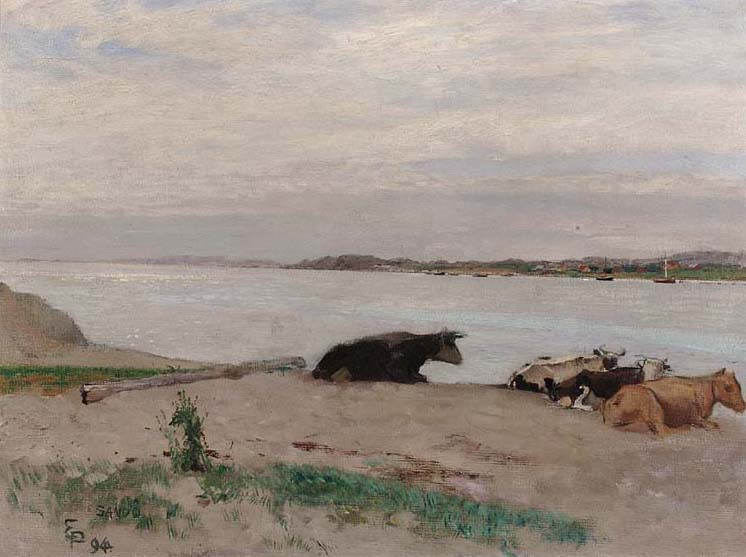
Sandø (1894)

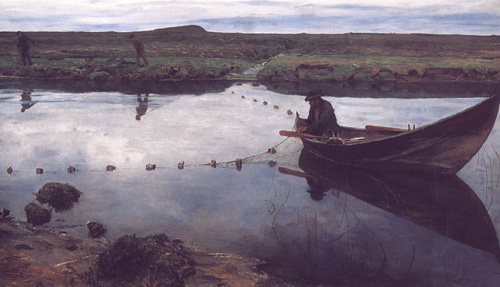
Laksefiskeren (1889)

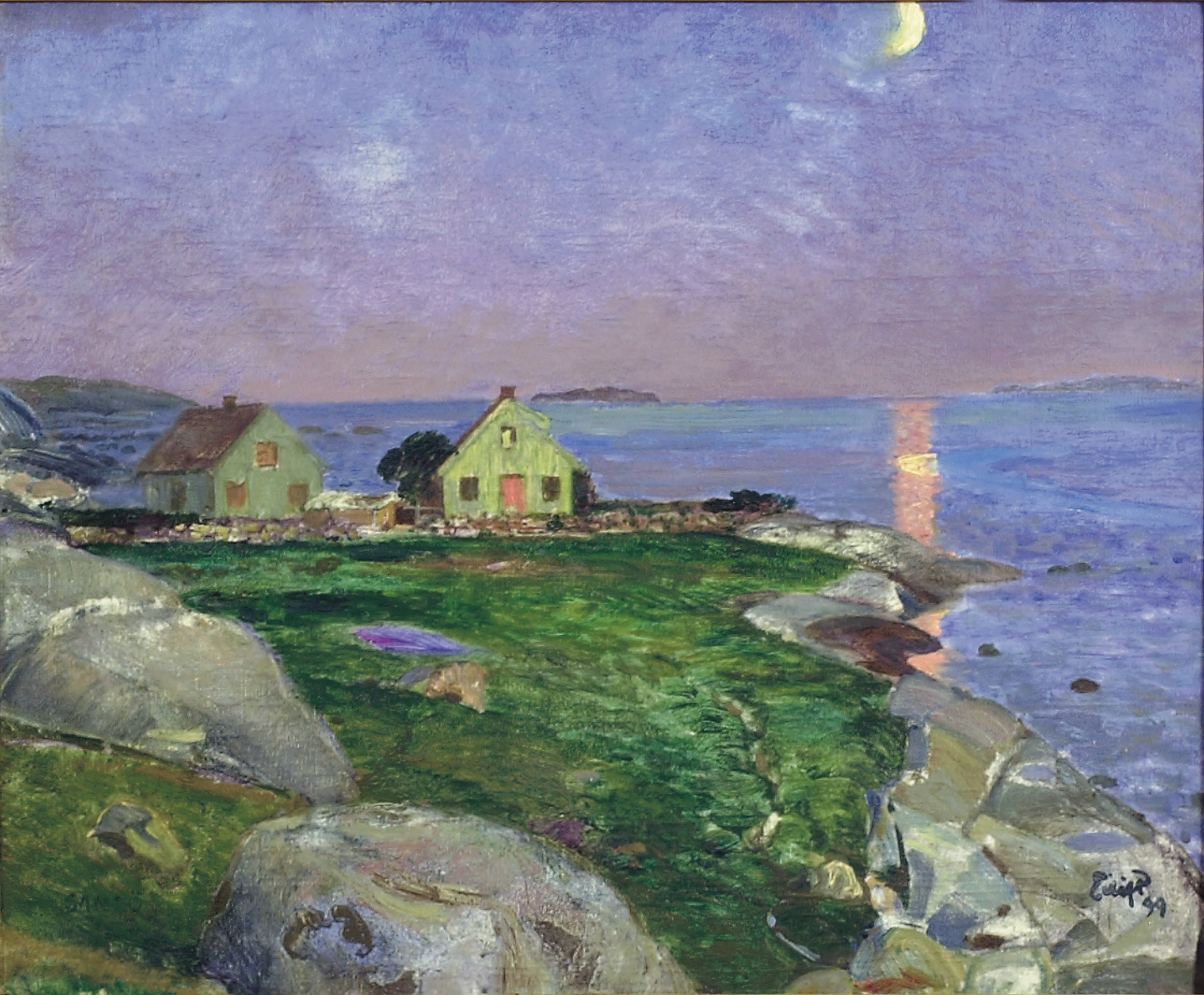
Sandø (1899)

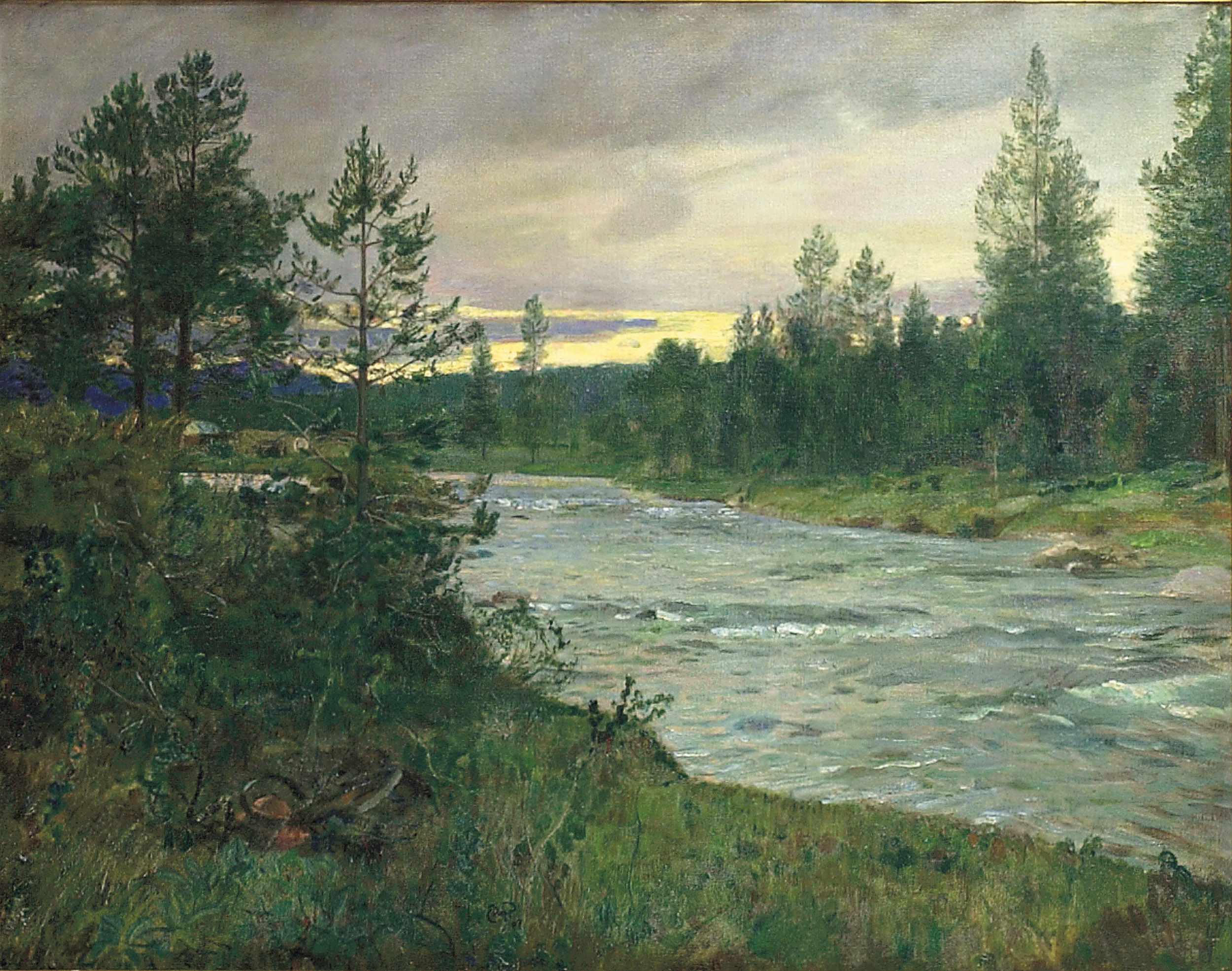
Fra Sevilosen ved Savallen (1907)

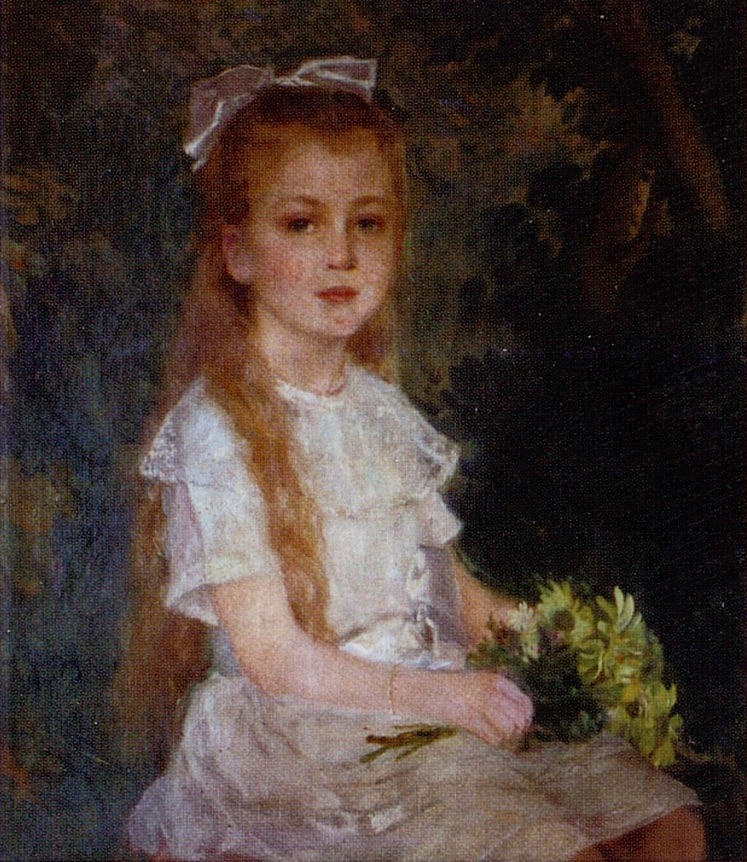
Helvig Paus (1915)

== Other sources ==
- Kokkin, Jan: Eilif Peterssen. Between Moods and Impressions (Pax Forlag, Oslo: 2009)
- Hoff, Svein Olav m.fl.: Eilif Peterssen : historiemaler, realist og nyromantiker : retrospektiv utstilling (Lillehammer kunstmuseum, 2001) ISBN 82-91388-32-6,
