= Thurber (disambiguation) =

Thurber can refer to:

== People ==
- Alexandre Thurber (1871–1958), Quebec industrialist and politician
- Charles Thurber, black man lynched in 1882
- Charles Thurber (inventor) (1803–1886), American inventor who contributed to the early typewriter
- George Thurber (1821–1890), American naturalist and writer
- James Thurber (1894–1961), American humorist and cartoonist, often known simply as Thurber
- James A. Thurber (born 1943), political science professor
- Jeannette Thurber (1850–1946), patron of classical music in the United States
- Jefferson G. Thurber (1807–1857), American politician in Michigan
- Marion Bartlett Thurber (1885–1973), American political spouse
- Rawson Marshall Thurber (born 1975), American filmmaker
- Samuel H. Thurber (1827–1870), American politician in Wisconsin
- Tom Thurber (1934–2010), Canadian politician
- Frances Thurber Seal (ca. 1860 – 1930s), Christian Science teacher from the U.S.A.

== Other uses ==
- Thurber, Texas, a ghost town
- Thurber House, a literary center named after James Thurber

== See also ==
- Torbjörn, for an etymology of the name
- Thorburn
- Thoburn
- Thulborn
- Turbin
