= Christian II signing the Death Warrant of Torben Oxe =

Painting by Eilif Peterssen

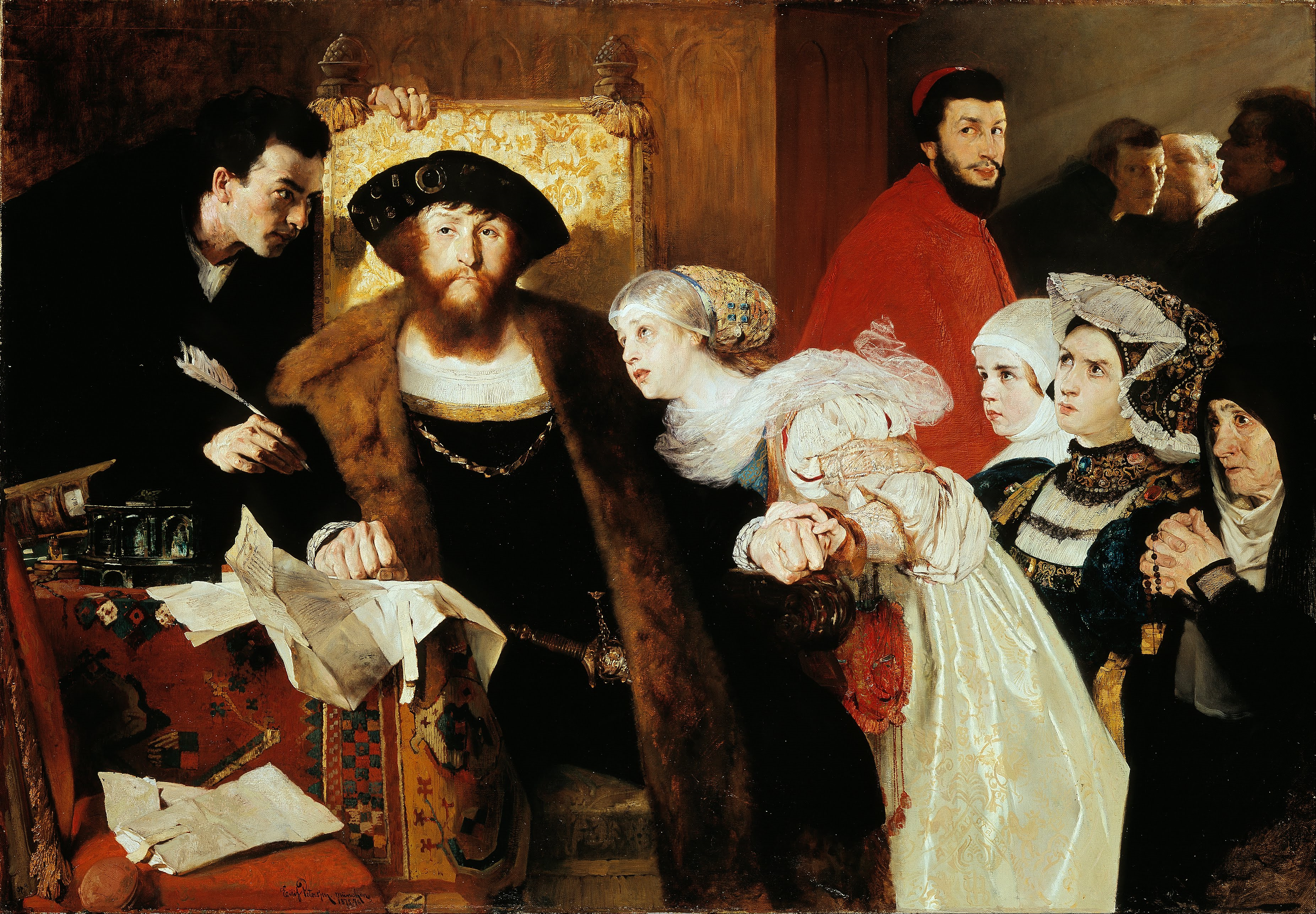
- Year: 1870s
- Medium: canvas, oil paint
- Dimensions: 141.5 cm (55.7 in) × 200.5 cm (78.9 in) × 2.5 cm (0.98 in)
- Location: National Museum of Norway
- Accession no.: NG.M.03118

Christian II signing the Death Warrant of Torben Oxe is an 1875–76 oil on canvas historical painting by Eilif Peterssen. It is considered one of the principal works of Norwegian historical painting, and is part of the collection of the National Museum of Art, Architecture and Design.

== History and content ==
It depicts a scene in 1517, the moment before Christian II of Denmark and Norway signs the death warrant of nobleman Torben Oxe, the governor of Copenhagen Castle. Oxe had been accused of murdering the king's mistress Dyveke Sigbritsdatter with some poisoned cherries in 1517, but was acquitted by the Council of the Realm. However, the king saw to it that he was accused again before a lower court, which sentenced him to death. The king sanctioned the sentence, despite appeals from the council, the court and Queen Elisabeth. The painting shows the king sitting with the documents lying in front of him and a total of nine other people around him and in the background. He is in doubt whether he should sign or not. He is aware that the nobility will turn against him if he signs, at the same time he will let Dyveke down if he pardons Oxe. The king's gaze is distant, his lips are pressed together and his hands are clasped. His advisor Didrik Slagheck is seen to the left, trying to persuade the king to sign. The Queen, to the king's right, is pleading for Oxe's life.

The people in the upper right corner symbolize the nobility who plan to plot against the king. The man dressed in a red cloak and with a red cap on his head is Giovanni Angelo Arcimboldi, the papal representative.

It was painted in Munich between 1875 and 1876, received critical acclaim and established Peterssen as one of Norway's foremost painters. It was bought by the Verbindung für historische Kunst before it was completed. In 1977 it was acquired by the National Gallery (now the National Museum of Art, Architecture and Design).
