= Thoburn =

Thoburn is a surname. Notable people with the surname include:

== People ==
- Crawford R. Thoburn (1862–1899), American Methodist minister
- Isabella Thoburn (1840–1901), American Christian missionary of the Methodist Episcopal Church in North India
- James Mills Thoburn (1836–1922), American bishop of the Methodist Episcopal Church known for his missionary work in India
- Joseph Thoburn (1825–1864), officer and brigade commander in the Union Army during the American Civil War
- Joseph Bradfield Thoburn (1866–1941), Oklahoma historian, long-time Director of Oklahoma Historical Society
- June Thoburn (born 1939), English academic
- Robert L. Thoburn (1929–2012), American state legislator and writer. Also founded the Fairfax Christian School
- William Thoburn (politician) (1847–1928), Canadian woollen manufacturer and politician in the province of Ontario
- William Thoburn (rower) (1906–1997), Canadian rower who competed in the 1932 Summer Olympics

== See also ==
- Thoburn v Sunderland City Council, important English constitutional law case
- Thorburn
- Thulborn
- Thurber (disambiguation)
- Torbjörn
- Turbin
