= Thorburn =

Thorburn is a surname. Notable people with the surname include:

- Alexander Thorburn (1836–1894), Scottish-born Canadian politician; provincial legislator in the Northwest Territories 1888–1891
- Archibald Thorburn (1860–1935), Scottish bird illustrator
- Chris Thorburn (born 1983), Canadian ice hockey player
- Cliff Thorburn (born 1948), Canadian snooker player
- James Thorburn (physician) (1830–1905), Canadian physician and University of Toronto professor
- Sir James Thorburn (governor) (1864–1929), British governor of the Gold Coast (now Ghana)
- John A. Thorburn (1946–2010), American Special Forces soldier and minor actor
- June Thorburn (1931–1967), English actress; killed in an air crash
- Nicholas Thorburn (born 1981), Canadian musician and songwriter
- Paul Thorburn (born 1962), Welsh rugby union football player
- Peter Thorburn (1939–2021), New Zealand rugby union coach
- R.A. Thorburn or R.A. the Rugged Man, American rapper
- Ray Thorburn (1930–1986), Australian politician from Cook; member of Parliament 1972–1975
- Ray Thorburn (artist) (1937–2023), New Zealand artist, art educator and museum director
- Robert Thorburn (disambiguation)
- Shona Thorburn (born 1982), English professional basketball player in the United States
- Thomas Thorburn (1913–2003), Swedish economist

== Places ==
- Thorburn, Nova Scotia

== See also ==
- Thoburn
- Thulborn
- Thurber (disambiguation)
- Torbjörn
- Turbin
