= St. Gertrude's Hospital, Copenhagen =

Geography
- Location: Copenhagan, Denmark
- Coordinates: 55°40′59″N 12°34′31″E

Links
- Lists: Hospitals in Denmark

St. Gertrude's Hospital, Copenhagen (Danish: S. Gertruds Kloster, S. Gertruds Hospital) was a locally important church and hospital in Copenhagen, Denmark.

== History ==
Saint Gertrude of Nivelles was one of the patron saints of travellers and merchants. She was a Benedictine nun, the daughter of Pepin of Landen and the first abbess of Nivelles Abbey in what is now Belgium. She died in 659 and was venerated as a saint even in her lifetime for her holiness. Many chapels dedicated to Saint Gertrude were found throughout Denmark where travellers could pause to pray for assistance. The chapels had wooden statues of the saint and were often located at important crossroads.

In Copenhagen St. Gertrude's was located in the area known as Rosengaard. Nothing is known of its foundation: possibly it was built on the site of an earlier residence of one of Denmark's noble families, as it would have required a donation of property for the buildings. It was sited near the outer wall of the city, near the main road to the north gate (Nørreport). This location fits the usual pattern of Saint Gertrude's chapels elsewhere in Denmark at important crossroads and entrances to towns.

The establishment consisted of a chapel, or church, together with a quasi-religious community, or fraternity (samfund). The fraternity was never affiliated with one of the recognized orders, but remained under the supervision of local priests in the charge of a decanus (dean or deacon).

In addition to the chapel itself and the buildings that housed the brothers there was also a building for the sick and poor, the origin of the hospital. There was also a graveyard, perhaps older than the original St. Gertrude's chapel itself. Over time St. Gertrude's came into possession of properties inside, and perhaps also outside, the city walls, which provided its income.

In 1397, during the reign of Margaret I, St. Gertrude's was being run as a religious house where weary travellers and itinerant workers could find a place to stay. Before 1454 a church existed on the site, though it continued to be called St. Gertrude's Chapel after the church was gone.

St. Gertrude's was not a priory in the strict sense, although several contemporary documents refer to it as such.

By 1517 St. Gertrude's had fallen on hard times. The graveyard had acquired a reputation as a place where criminals were buried, and the popular nobleman Torben Oxe was beheaded there by order of Christian II.

In 1524 the running of St. Gertrude's Hospital was combined with St. Anne's Hospital, Copenhagen. By 1530 the chapel had been abandoned and any money collected in the offertory box was to go towards funding the hospital, and not to the decanus.

== Dissolution ==
By 1530 St Gertrude's had become a hospital for common people. During the Reformation and the dissolution of religious communities in Denmark, the disposition of the property apparently lay in the hands of crown administrators. The crown's rights and interest in the property were given to the knight Johan Bjørn; the same day the dean or deacon of St. Gertrude's received the rights to Rosbæk Mill Farm, presumably to replace his lost income. The church was listed among those under consideration to become parish churches in Copenhagen by the State Council Commission which had been established to determine the future of religious buildings after the Reformation. Eventually the entire institution was converted into a hospital which expanded over time.

== Later history ==
St. Gertrude's Hospital was destroyed in the great city fire of 1728. The only remains from the original St. Gertrude's are the large vaulted cellars beneath the present buildings at Coal Market Square (Danish: Kultorv). The hospital building was rebuilt even larger and more splendid than before. During the British bombardment of Copenhagen in 1807, the tower of the hospital caught fire and collapsed into the body of the building, causing major damage. The building was repaired and the tower rebuilt, though without the gilding that had made it a target of the British gunners.

Occasionally skeletal remains and coffins are uncovered during modern excavations. Parts of the second hospital building survive and have become a well-known restaurant which preserves the original name St Gertruds Kloster.

== Sources ==
- Nielsen, Dr. Oluf, 1877: Kjøbenhavn i Middelalderen. Copenhagen: G. E. C. Gads Forlag; text available online at Kjøbenhavn i Middelalderen (kap. XVI: Klostre og Hospitaler) (in Danish)
