= Helvig Paus (painting) =

Painting by Eilif Peterssen

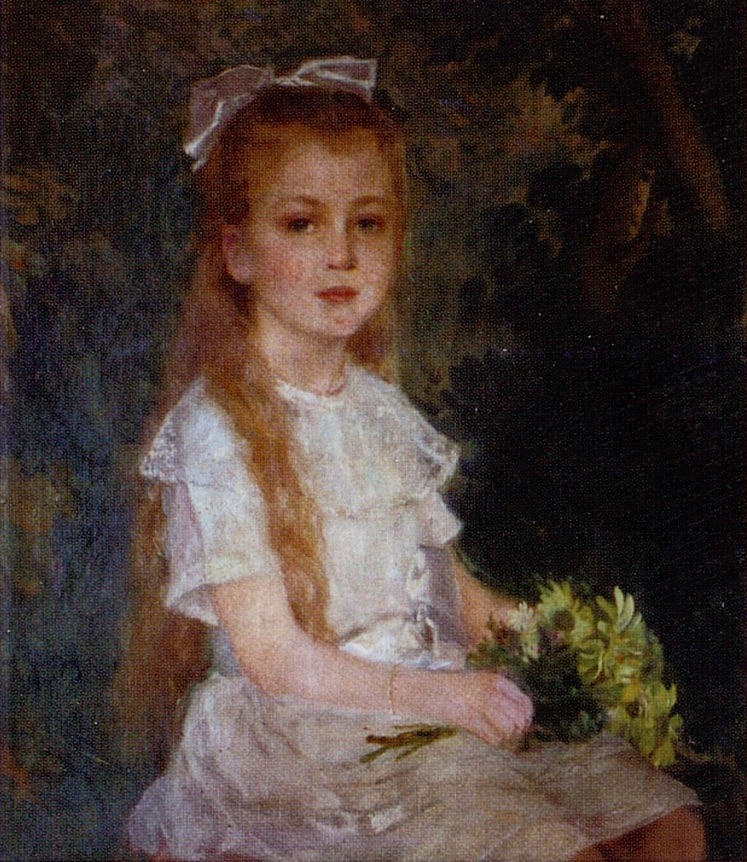
- Year: 1915
- Dimensions: 81 cm (32 in) × 71 cm (28 in)

Helvig Paus is a 1915 oil on canvas painting by Eilif Peterssen, one of Norway's foremost portrait painters of the late 19th and early 20th centuries. It has been described as one of his "most charming portraits of children." The painting was made in Vienna in 1915.

== History and provenance ==
Its subject, Helvig Paus (1909–1976), until 1919 officially Helvig von Paus, was seven years old when she sat for the portrait, which was made when Eilif Peterssen visited Vienna in 1915. Helvig Paus was the daughter of the Norwegian consul-general in Vienna Thorleif Paus and Ella Stein, who was of Austrian-Jewish descent. Her father had moved to Vienna from Norway in 1902 and had become the only diplomatic representative of Norway in Austria-Hungary when Norway declared independence in 1905, despite only being a 23-year old consular secretary at the time. Helvig's maternal family converted from Judaism to Catholicism in the late 19th century. She was herself raised in the Lutheran state Church of Norway. When she was a child the family lived in Marokkanergasse 18, the exact address where the protagonist of the Inspector Rex TV show lives. Helvig Paus lived in Vienna until 1938, when she and her mother fled Anschluss and joined her brother Ole Paus, the WWII-era Norwegian resistance leader and later general, in Oslo. Her nephew, the Norwegian singer Ole Paus, lived with her as a child in Oslo in the 1950s. She died in Oslo in 1976. The portrait is owned by the singer Ole Paus.
