= At Daggers Drawn (novel) =

1870 Russian novel

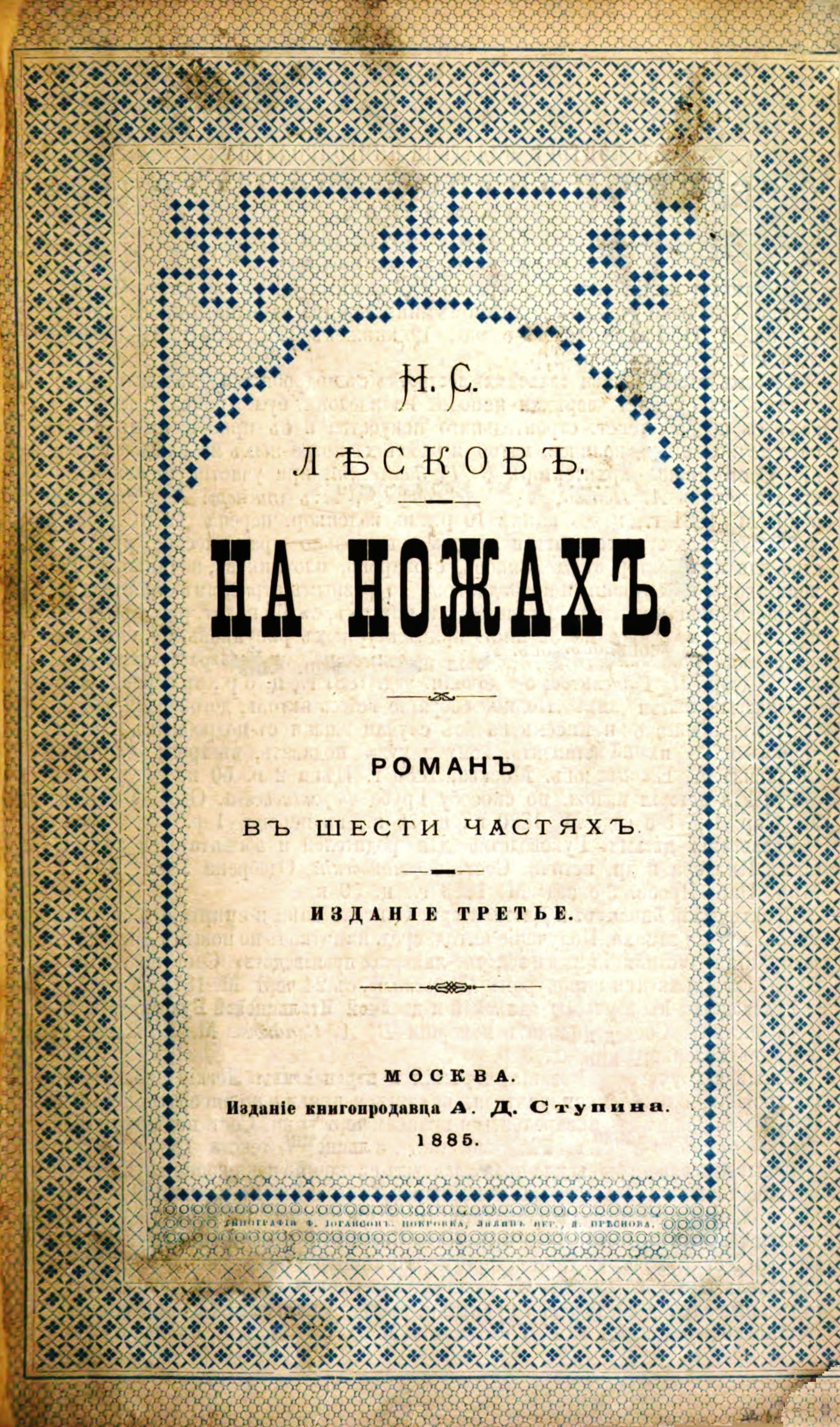
- 1885 cover
- Author: Nikolai Leskov
- Original title: На ножах
- Language: Russian
- Publication date: 1871
- Publication place: Russia
- Media type: Print (Paperback & Hardback)
- Preceded by: Old Years in Plodomasovo (1869)
- Followed by: The Cathedral Clergy (1872)

At Daggers Drawn (Russian: На ножах, romanized: Na nozhakh) is an anti-nihilist novel by Nikolai Leskov, first published in 1870 (issues 10–12) and 1871 (issues 1–8, 10) by Russky Vestnik. In November 1871, the novel was released in book form. The novel's original text was severely edited by the magazine's staff.

== Background ==
As the first chapters of this scathing political satire aimed at the Russian social democrats of the time started to appear in Russky Vestnik, allegations started to emerge among the Russian literary left, stating that it had been commissioned personally by its editor Mikhail Katkov. Repeated continuously by generations of Russian and Soviet critics, those were totally groundless, according to the modern literary historian Alla Shelayeva. Leskov's personal correspondence corroborates such view: he seems to have been utterly devastated by the way the magazine treated his text.

In his October and November 1870 letters to Pyotr Schebalsky he complained about whole chapters being thrown out, and asked this respected literary critic, close to the magazine to exert his personal influence over Katkov to protect him from these "tortures", calling one of the editors, Lyubimov, "the monster, Atilla, the killer of literature." In an April 1871 letter to Schebalsky, Leskov confessed to having finished the novel hastily, merely to fulfil his obligations." There was a practical reason for this haste as well: in those days he was busy completing Grief And Laughter (1871) and The Cathedral Clergy (1866–1872). Later, in 1885 Leskov rated At Daggers Drawn as arguably the weakest of his novels.

When and why exactly Leskov decided to write the novel which proved to be so disastrous to his reputation, remained unknown. According to Andrey Nikolayevich, the author’s son and biographer, his father always refused to discuss the book which, in his own words, "crushed" him.

=== Prototypes ===
According to Andrey Leskov, in Alexandra Ivanovna Syntyanina the author portrayed his father's aunt Natalia Petrovna Strakhova, who was also forced to "enjoy the dubious privilege of being the wife of a madman from very early years." The journalist and playwright Sergey Turbin, an eccentric man and an atheist thinker, served as a prototype for the Forov character.

Another real-life man of letters, Vsevolod Krestovsky, might have been the prototype of the Vyslenyov character, at least he himself thought so (although Leskov denied this). Some critics noticed a curious detail. The relations between old man Bodrostin and Princess Vakhterminskaya in At Draggers Drawn are very similar to those between Schadursky and Baroness von Dering in Krestovsky's 1864 novel The Slums of Saint Petersburg.

== Reception ==
Despite the negative response from the Russian literary left, At Daggers Drawn proved to be popular with the readership. "According to the Flying Library accounts, my novel is being read with avidness which exceeds all expectations," Leskov remarked.

Fyodor Dostoyevsky expressed his delight with the Evangel and Vanskok characters and praised Leskov for his masterful portraying of the small clergy. His general opinion of the novel, though, was low, and he dismissed it as "fanciful nonsense."

Maxim Gorky was also very fond of Anna Skokova (or Vanskok), a "funny-looking revolutionary girl," and credited Leskov with being artful and realistic in depicting this particular character. On the whole, however, he condemned At Daggers Drawn as being "spiteful and full of vengeance". In the 1930s, Andrei Leskov complained about it in a letter to Gorky, but drew no response. The latter's verdict has been accepted by several generations of Soviet critics as definitive. The novel has been panned as tendentious, reactionary, and occasionally even anti-Semitic, on the basis of there being a minor character named Tikhon Kushevsky, who was both a Jew and a cynical crook. It was not included into the 11-volume Khudozhestvennaya Literatura collection.

In the late 1950s, critic B.M. Drugov in his comprehensive study of Leskov legacy alleged that the novel had been concocted from "the receipts written by Katkov" and quoted Ieronim Yasinsky: "When for the first time I entered the circle of Vasily Stepanovich Kurochkin in 1870… people spoke of [Leskov] with disdain, as of a Third Section man," the accusation which the modern scholar Alla Shelayeva called "slanderous". Boris Bukhstab in his preface for the 1973 six-volume Leskov collection, described the novel as "bad" and "weak", with "every character being a blackmailer, a thief or a murderer."

The first attempt at reviewing At Daggers Drawn objectively in the USSR came in 1978 when Irina Stolyarova in her essay "Searching for an Ideal" suggested that the novel should be regarded as not so much an attack on the social democrats of its time, as a 'research', motivated by its author's "desire to respond quickly to the hot issues, cast the newly emerging character types, reveal new mindsets and new relations that were starting to take shape in the Russian life of the time." Later Alla Shelayeva, while admitting the novel was a scathing satire, opined that its aim had been not all 'nihilists', but only what the author regarded as "the foam of the movement." This view is corroborated by Nikolai Leskov's letter to Alexey Suvorin, in which he wrote: "I do not imply that crookedness 'comes directly from nihilism,' there is no such idea in my novel... I am convinced that crookedness had leached upon nihilism exactly in the same way it's been leeching upon idealism, theology or patriotism..."

== The film ==
In 1998 in Moscow the TV series of the same title was filmed at the Maxim Gorky's Studio by director Alexander Orlov who also wrote the script.
