= Norman McCaskie =

English cricketer

Norman McCaskie (23 March 1911 – 1 July 1968) was an English first-class cricketer active 1931–32 who played for Middlesex and Oxford University. He was born in Kensington; died in Theale. His uncle, Robert Thorburn, was also a first-class cricketer.
