= Robert Thorburn =

Robert Thorburn may refer to:

- Robert Thorburn (politician) (1836–1906), British-born Newfoundland merchant and politician, premier of Newfoundland
- Robert Thorburn (painter) (1818–1885), Scottish miniature painter
- Robert Thorburn (cricketer) (1883–1943), Scottish cricketer
- Robert Macfie Thorburn (1828–1896), Swedish-Scottish businessman and Swedish politician
