= Turbin =

Turbin is the surname of the following people:

- Arseny Turbin (born 2008), Russian political activist
- Neil Turbin (born 1963), American thrash metal vocalist
- Nikolay Turbin (1832–?), Russian general and archaeologist
- Robert Turbin (born 1989), American football running back
- Sergey Turbin (1821–1884), Russian playwright and journalist
- Viktor Turbin (1922–1944), Red Army officer and Hero of the Soviet Union

== See also ==
- Thorburn
- Thoburn
- Thulborn
- Thurber (disambiguation)
- Torbjörn
