= Fairfax Christian School =

The Fairfax Christian School
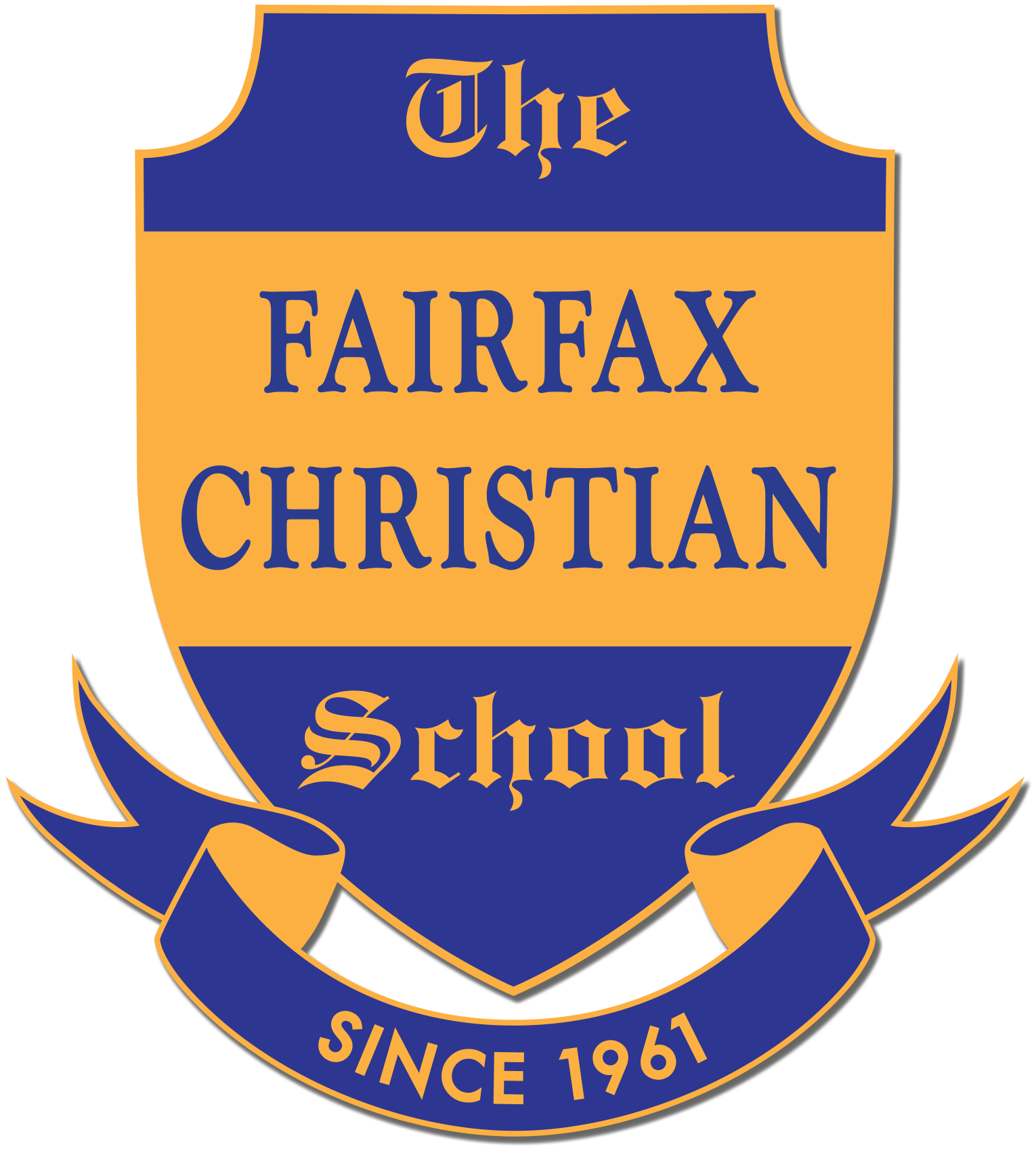
- Fairfax Christian School logo

Location
- 22870 Pacific Boulevard; Dulles, Fairfax / Loudoun, Virginia 20166; United States

Information
- School type: Private day and boarding school
- Motto: “Wisdom begins with respect for the Lord.” — Proverbs 9:10
- Religious affiliation: Non-denominational
- Founded: 1961
- President & CEO: Jo A. S. Thoburn
- Chief Administrator: David L. Thoburn
- Years offered: K - 12
- Enrolment: Approx. 300 (2024)
- Campus type: Suburban
- Slogan: "Creating Scholars"
- Athletics conference: Northern Virginia Independent Athletic Conference
- Mascot: Cardinal

The Fairfax Christian School is a Christian school covering pre-kindergarten through 12th grade in Dulles, Virginia, United States.

== History ==
The school was founded in 1961 in Fairfax City by Presbyterian clergyman Robert L. Thoburn. The Fairfax Christian School started as a kindergarten through 8th grade institution before adding the 9th grade in 1964, 10th grade in 1965, 11th grade in 1966, and 12th grade in 1967. The first class of high school students graduated in the spring of 1968, the year the school's total student population peaked at more than 650.

In 1981, the Fairfax Christian School was featured in an article in People magazine that discussed how its teaching was based on "standards that come out of a biblical world." This commitment to an education rooted in biblical standards made the school attractive to families in Washington, D.C.'s conservative community, including the families of former South Carolina Senator Strom Thurmond, former Illinois Representative Phil Crane, and Howard Phillips, founder of the Conservative Caucus.

In 1992 the Fairfax Christian School moved to Hunter Mill Road in Fairfax, Virginia. The 28-acre site included five academic buildings, soccer fields, basketball courts, volleyball courts, and a playground.

In 2016, the Fairfax Christian School was the first K-12 school to receive the Presidential "E" Award from the Department of Commerce. Secretary of Commerce Penny Pritzker noted, "The 'E' Awards Committee was very impressed with The Fairfax Christian School's dedication to providing quality education to students from around the world. The school's adaptation of its curriculum to accommodate non-English speakers was also particularly notable."

In 2018 the Fairfax Christian School moved to its current location on Pacific Boulevard in Dulles, Virginia. This 50,000 square-foot campus is located on fifteen acres near Washington-Dulles International Airport. The site includes science labs, computer labs, art studio, library, performance hall, and outdoor play and recreation areas.

== Head of school ==
- Jo A. S. Thoburn (2001–present)

== Location ==
=== Dulles Campus ===
The Fairfax Christian School is located on Pacific Boulevard in Dulles, Virginia. The 15-acre site includes a 50,000 square-foot state-of-the-art facility near Washington-Dulles International Airport.

== Education ==
The Fairfax Christian School enrolls students from kindergarten through grade 12.

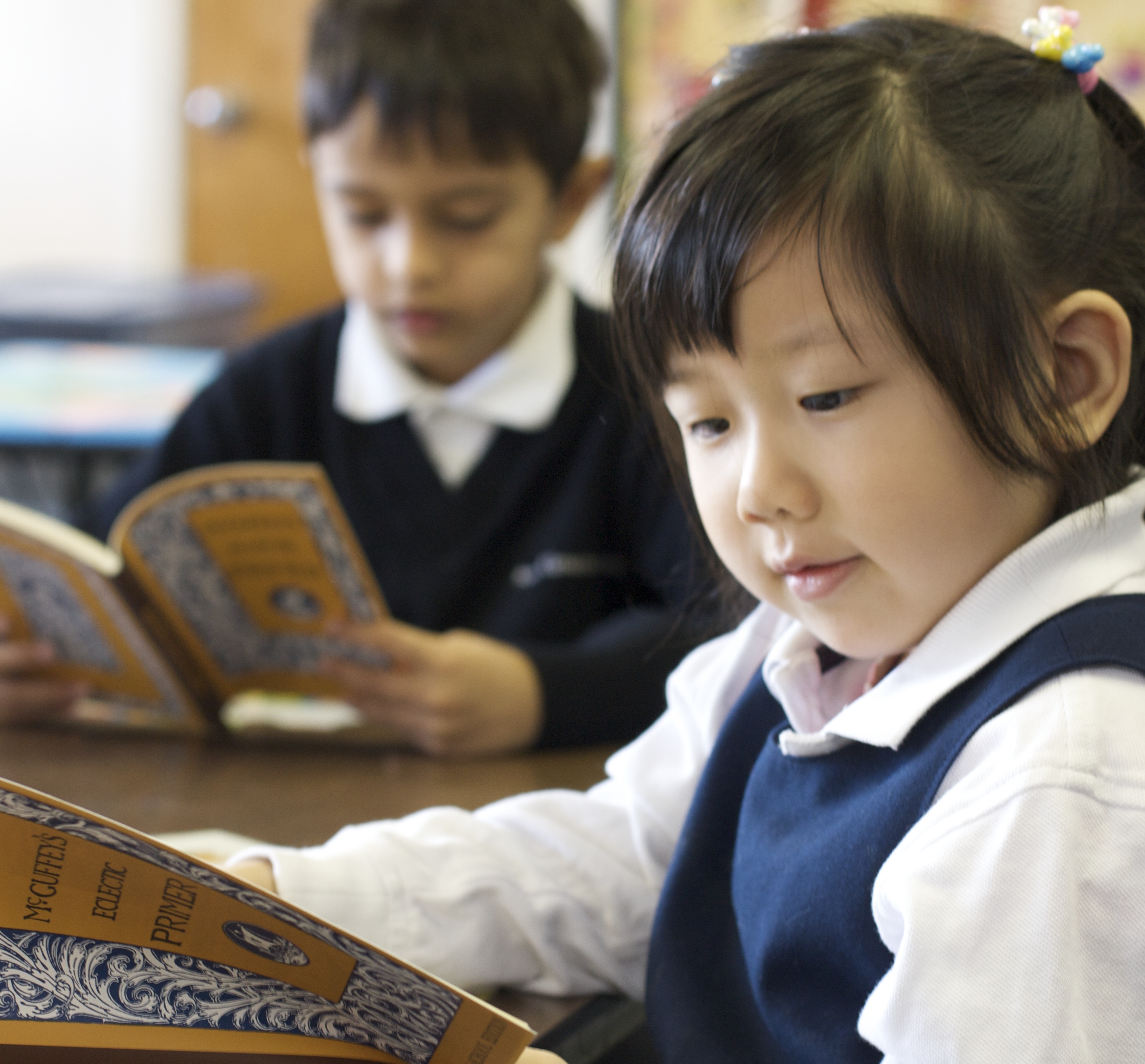
Fairfax Christian School McGuffey

Though the school is Christian in name and practice, its website describes it as an "independent non-denominational school". It does not require students, nor their families, to be members of any Christian religion.

Academic instruction is conducted by a professional staff of 44.

Lower School

The Lower School includes kindergarten through 4th grade. Education focuses on introductory mathematics, phonics-based reading, history, science, physical education, art, music, French, Latin, and Bible study.

Middle School

The Middle School includes 5th through 8th grades. Education focuses on English, mathematics, science, history, foreign language (French, Spanish and Latin), physical education, music, and Bible study. Middle School students may enroll in electives.

High school

High school level students study English and English literature, the sciences, mathematics (linear algebra through Calculus BC), foreign language (French, Spanish, Latin and Chinese), history, business, Bible study, art, music, and physical education. Students may enroll in Advanced Placement courses and general electives like computer science and economics.

All high school students receive academic advising for college beginning in the 9th grade. Advising is provided by school administrators and teachers.

== Enrollment ==
Fairfax Christian School features an approximate annual enrollment of 250, with an average class size of 15 students.

International

The Fairfax Christian School accepts international students. Many of them come to the school for an immersion in American culture, economic principles, and the English language.

== Student life ==
Arts

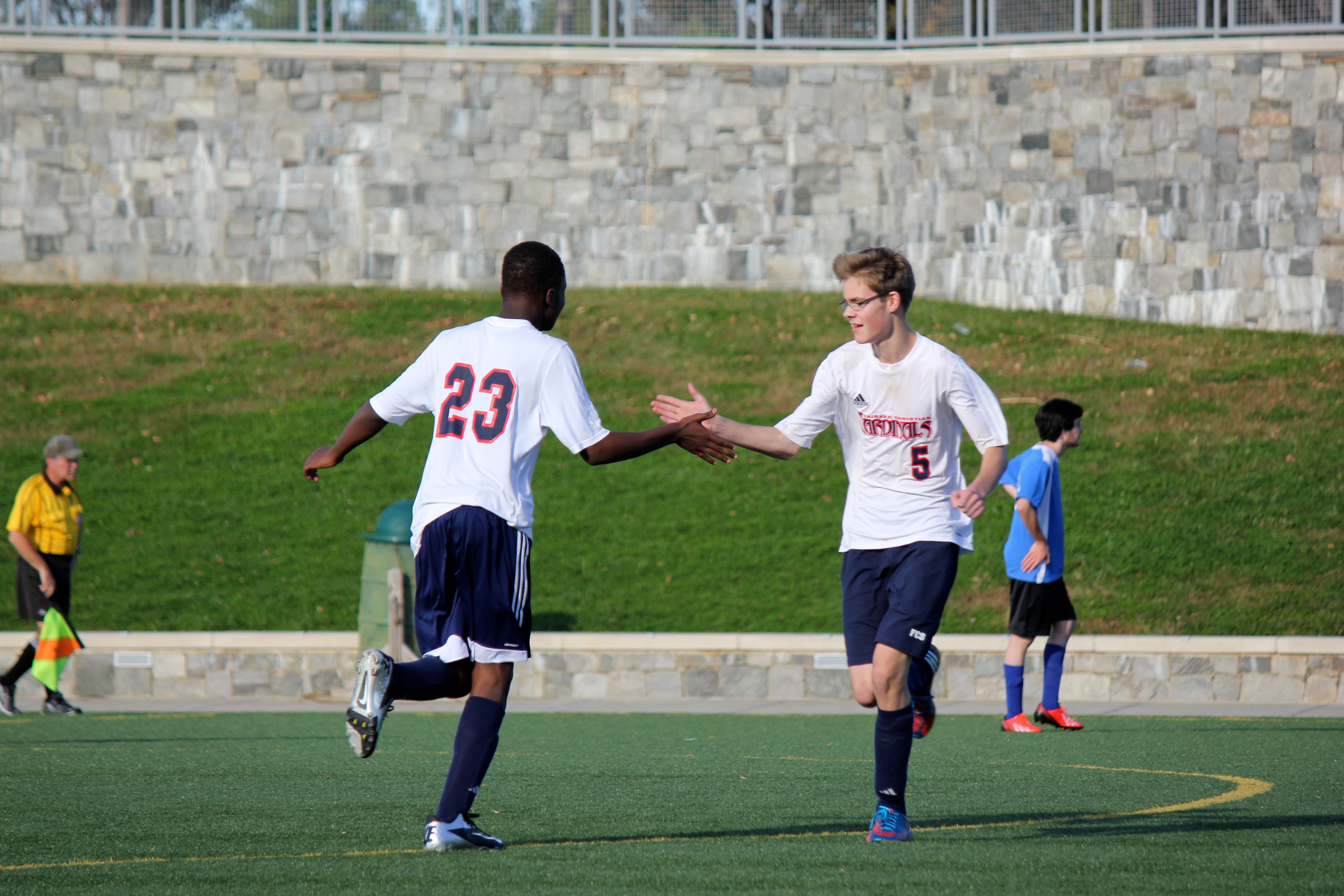
Fairfax Christian School athletics

The Fairfax Christian School offers several options for students interested in the fine arts, including a fife & drum corps, music ensemble, a cappella choir, photography, and graphic design.

Athletics

As a member of the Northern Virginia Independent Athletic Conference, students in middle and high school are eligible to play sports including boys' and girls' soccer, boys' and girls' basketball, boys' and girls' cross country, boys' flag football, and girls' volleyball.

The school mascot is the Cardinal.

National Christian Schools Athletic Association championships

2020-2021 Varsity Boys' Basketball Division III Champions

2021-2022 Varsity Boys Basketball Division II Champions

2023-2024 Varsity Boys' Basketball Division I Champions

State championships

2020-2021 Boys' Basketball Division III State Invitational Tournament Champions

2022-2023 Boys' Basketball Division III State Champions

2023-2024 Boys' Basketball Division III State Champions

NVIAC Conference championships

Basketball

2019-2020 Varsity Boys' Basketball Champions

2020-2021 Varsity Boys' Basketball Champions

2021-2021 Junior Varsity Boys' Basketball Champions

2021-2022 Varsity Boys' Basketball Champions

2021-2022 Junior Varsity Boys' Basketball Champions

2022-2023 Varsity Boys' Basketball Champions

2023-2023 Junior Varsity Boys' Basketball Champions

2023-2024 Varsity Boys Basketball Champions

Volleyball

2019-2020 Middle School Girls' Volleyball Champions

2020-2021 Middle School Girls' Volleyball Champions

2021-2022 Middle School Girls' Volleyball Champions

2022-2023 Junior Varsity Girls' Volleyball Champions

2023-2024 Junior Varsity Girls' Volleyball Champions

Flag football

2023-2024 Varsity Flag Football Champions

Community service

All high school students at the Fairfax Christian School are required to complete an unspecified quantity of community service, and students are "free to serve where their interests lie."

== Notable alumni ==
Noteworthy Fairfax Christian School alumni include:

- Evan Bayh - United States Senator
- Paul Cantelon – composer and musician
- Bob Latta - United States Congressman
