= Torbjörn Björlund =

Swedish politician (born 1957)

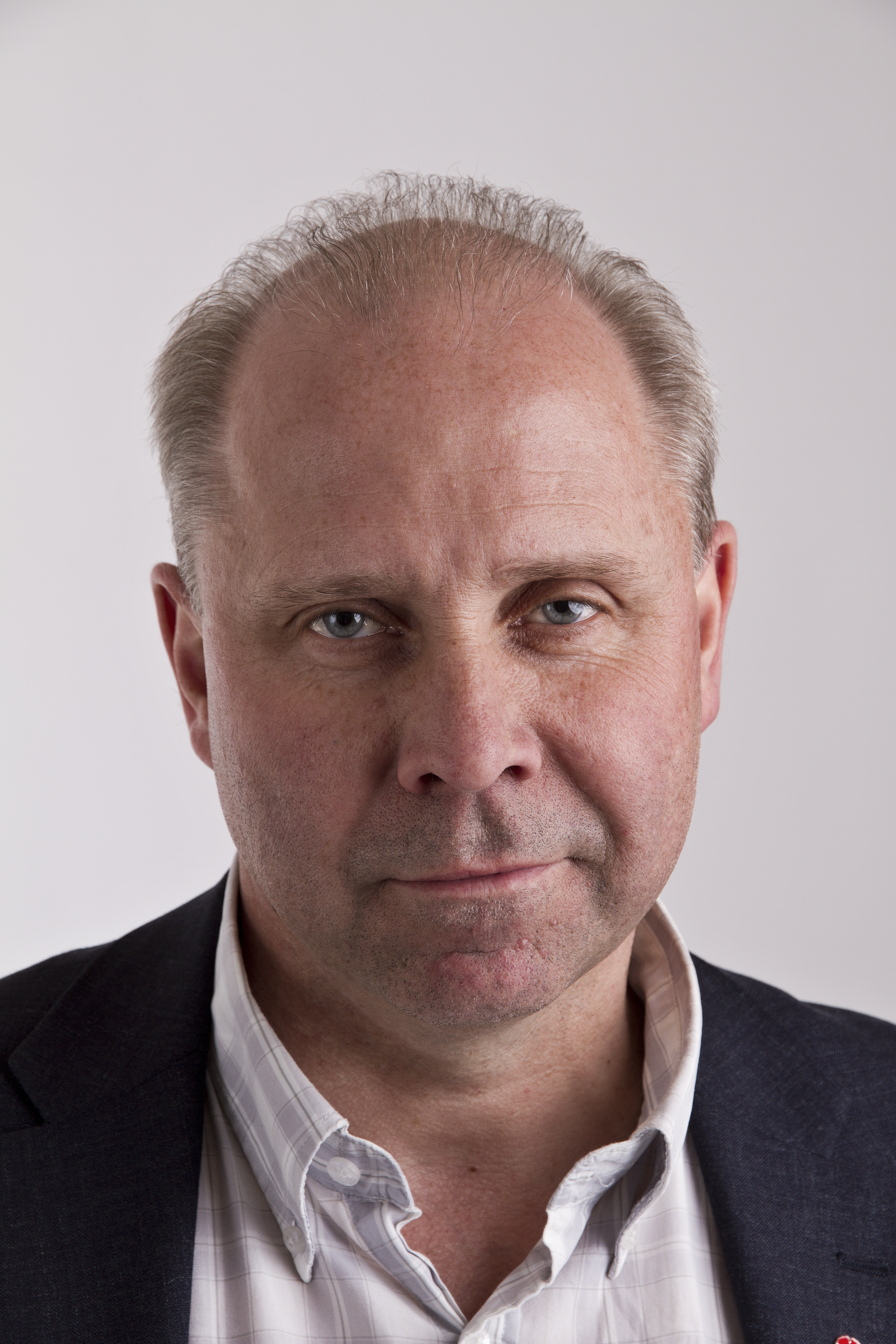
- Björlund in May 2010

Member of the Riksdag
- In office 2 October 2006 – 29 September 2014
- Constituency: Östergötland County

Personal details
- Born: John Torbjörn Björlund; 1957 (age 68–69)
- Party: Left Party

John Torbjörn Björlund (born 1957) is a Swedish politician and former member of the Riksdag, the national legislature. A member of the Left Party, he represented Östergötland County between October 2006 and September 2014. He was also a substitute member of the Riksdag for Linda Westerlund Snecker twice: between April 2015 and June 2015; and between August 2015 and January 2016.

Björlund is the son of train driver Åke Björlund and journalist Maj-Britt Björlund (née Wennberg). He was educated in Motala and studied leisure education at Linköping University. He was a gardener (1977), paper mill worker (1977-1985), substitute teacher (1986), leisure teacher (1986-1987), treatment assistant (1988-1989), consultant (1989-2002) and an ombudsman (2003-2006).
