= Torbjörn Evrell =

Swedish inventor and businessman (1920–2008)

- Born: March 29, 1920; Stockholm Lidingö, Sweden
- Died: 22 April 2008; Eskilstuna, Sweden
- Occupation(s): Entrepreneur and inventor
- Spouse: Ulla
- Children: Lennart, Britta Elzén, Karin Ingelson

Rune Torbjörn Evrell (March 29, 1920 – April 22, 2008) was a Swedish inventor and businessman who made major innovations in folding knife construction, knife designs and knife production methods at EKA-knivar AB Eskilstuna, Sweden.

== Life and career ==
Born 1920 in Stockholm, Lidingö. Between the age of 11 and 12 he lived in Muncie Indiana, USA. His father, Kaleb Evrell, developed a patent for an automatic transmission for passenger cars for Warner Gears. After the US experience the family moved to Eskilstuna.

Torbjörn Evrell received his degree mechanical engineering in 1945 from the Royal Institute of Technology. His first job was at Centrala Torpedverkstaden, CTV (Torpedo factory of the Swedish Defence Industries) in Motala.

In 1946 Torbjörn Evrell took management of Eskilstuna Knivfabriks AB (EKA) knife making company when the owner John Elmquist (Evrells father in law) unexpectedly died. Evrell, specialist in submersible motors and pumps, now became President of EKA at the age of 26. He took over a company, which in many respects was using production methods of the late 1800s, with a rather outdated machinery with many processes with belt drive from hydropower. Evrell started modernisation . Production technology was improved and the old knife range cut down and new modern knives had to be developed. Evrell first task was to clean up the knife range. He took out a full sales statistics and noted that many models were marginal to sales or outdated. He considered that he could immediately reduce the number of models from 91 to 37. Moreover, he introduced standard components which could be used in several knives.

Evrell also introduced a new systematic production planning, improved methods and machinery were upgraded. Everything to make better knives cheaper. Evrell started using subcontractors and concentrated construction and production to knives.

He was throughout his career continuously involved in all areas of the company including knife innovation, production and marketing. There are a number of influential knife patents in his name. Out of the one time many dozens of knife making companies of Eskilstuna, his was the only one to survive by constant innovation and adaptions to new conditions.

Evrell was the president of EKA until 1985, when he was succeeded by his daughter Karin Ingelson. Torbjörn Evrell continued as an advisor to EKA, especially in product development, for ten more years.

== Contributions in knife design, construction and production ==
Prior to 1970, all knives were riveted. Riveting was done by hand, and all work with assembly and adjustment, requires craftsmanship which is very labor-intensive. It took at least three to four years for a workman to reach the skill and speed required in production. Evrell realized the problems and wanted to find a faster and less labor-intensive method, while at the same time make the world's best folding knife with one blade. An effort started in November 1967 to come up with a new construction to hold a knife together. The final version of the knife was improved by two external consultants to the company: Olle Nordlund and the industrial designer Sigvard Bernadotte U.S. patent D227071. The results were presented in March 1970 when Evrell could launch the first bolted folding knife in the Swede series. The first two models were named Swede 38 (design Sigvard Bernadotte) and Swede 45. The special features of the Swede knives is that the scales are screwed in place. The knife scales can easily be removed, with a screwdriver or coin, for cleaning and lubrication of the blade and inside. The screws are also used to adjust the blade folding mechanism. This new way to manufacture folding knives was completely revolutionary and came to mean a big international breakthrough for EKA. The Swede series started with the EKA Swede 38 knife with plastic scales (offered in several colors) and brass screws with a blade in either carbon steel or stainless steel. The Swede 45 had wooden scales. These first models have been followed by several models with incremental developments.

Another of Evrells inventions is a small folding knife where the whole knife including the folding mechanism is welded together.

With increasing demand EKA-knivar continually made improvements to production methods. The production capacity was increased significantly. In 1971 the company with factory and office in central Eskilstuna was moved to newly built premises at Sättargatan 4 in Vilsta industrial area.

== Marketing ==
EKA Swede 38 and Swede 45 models

Torbjörn Evrell was very aware of the value of marketing a knife. In 1967 he established a dedicated marketing department within his company, which was of great importance to the company's continued expansion. He also took advantage of the marketing value in a knife. All knife models have been available for branding and adaptation as promotional gifts to mark a sign of quality.
