= Thulborn =

Thulborn is an Anglo-Saxon surname dating back to the late 12th century AD, derived from the baptismal name for the "son of Thurburn". Notable people with the surname include:

- Richard A. Thulborn, British paleontologist
- Scott Thulborn (born 1984), Australian lawn bowls player

== See also ==
- Thorburn
- Thoburn
- Torbjörn
- Thurber (disambiguation)
- Turbin
