= Charles Thurber =

American lynching victim

Charles Thurber was a black man lynched in Grand Forks, North Dakota, on October 24, 1882. A plaque was installed in 2020 to memorialize Thurber, whose lynching took place on the St. Paul, Minneapolis and Manitoba Railway (later becoming the Great Northern Railway) bridge over the Red River between Grand Forks, North Dakota and East Grand Forks, Minnesota.

Thurber was accused of raping two white women, one the wife of a railroad worker and the other described as a 14-year-old "Norwegian servant girl". According to one of the illustrated North Dakota Mysteries and Oddities books, at least one of Thurber's accusers may have recanted her story. That said, Thurber had previously served two prison terms for attempted rape in Wisconsin.

== Accounts ==
The lynching was described in the Daily Herald (which is now the Grand Forks Herald) in articles that are quite shocking to modern readers.

For example, at one point the headline writer used poetry, as follows:

Quiet and Peace Entirely Restored
and with an Investigation no One will be Bored
Public Opinion Carefully Sifted
and Every One Rejoices that the Negro was lifted
No Investigation Required
and None Need Fear for Themselves in the Trouble being mired
Thurber, the Negro Rapest [sic] Fell off the Bridge and was Hurt
while Mr. Thomas COVERED HIM UP WITH RED RIVER DIRT.

Racial expletives were used in headlines. According to the existing historical accounts, a mob of citizens broke down the doors of the jail to abduct Thurber before any trial could take place. Some law enforcement members fought to prevent Thurber from being removed from the jail, but were reportedly overpowered. Rival mobs put two nooses on Thurber's neck and engaged in a tug-of-war there in the street. Thurber may have already been dead when he was lynched from the middle of a railroad bridge over the Red River. According to the Grand Forks Herald newspaper account of October 24, 1882, Thurber admitted to the crime before he was lynched.

== Burial ==
A description of Thurber's burial comes from the Daily Herald.

"Mr O.M. Thomas drove the body, incased [sic] in a plain coffin, to the cemetery. No mourners or even spectators followed. It was decided that no inquest would be held. No one demanded it and nobody wanted it. Directly or indirectly, almost the entire town was implicated. There being not the slightest pretension to secrecy, no investigation as to the means of this death was necessary. It is understood the he fell of [sic] the bridge and was hurt."

"Yesterday public comment over the lynching of Thurber completely subsided, and while it was the universal theme of conversation, yet it was mainly good humored comment and recitals of the amusing episodes omitted from the reports."
