= Thubron =

Thubron is an English family name, it is a variant of old Norse surnames. It is considered a rare last name and according to the Thubron surname website which studies the surname, all parties with the surname are related and descend from a small group of vikings. Persons with the surname who are famous may refer to:

- Ernest Blakelock Thubron, a.k.a. Émile Thubron (1861–1927), Anglo-French motorboat racer and Olympic competitor
- Gerald Thubron OBE (1903–1992), British soldier
- Colin Thubron (born 1939), British writer
- Harry Thubron (1915–1985) English artist and art teacher
