= Robert Thorburn (cricketer) =

Scottish cricketer

Personal information
- Full name: Robert Murray Thorburn
- Born: 22 March 1883; Peebles, Peeblesshire, Scotland
- Died: 8 May 1943 (aged 60); Edinburgh, Midlothian, Scotland
- Batting: Unknown
- Bowling: Unknown
- Relatives: Norman McCaskie (nephew)

Domestic team information
- Years: Team
- 1924: Scotland

Career statistics
Competition	First-class
Matches	1
Runs scored	11
Batting average	5.50
100s/50s	–/–
Top score	11
Balls bowled	12
Wickets	0
Bowling average	–
5 wickets in innings	–
10 wickets in match	–
Best bowling	–
Catches/stumpings	–/–
- Source: Cricinfo, 2 November 2022

Robert Murray Thorburn (22 March 1883 – 8 May 1943) was a Scottish first-class cricketer.

The son of Colonel William Thorburn, he was born at Peebles in March 1883 and was educated at Blair Lodge School in Falkirk. Thorburn volunteered in the 6th Battalion, Royal Scots, being commissioned as a second lieutenant in May 1903. He proceeded to be appointed to the 8th Battalion in November 1908, with the rank of lieutenant, before resigning his commission in January 1909. He later served in the Royal Scots during the First World War, being appointed a second lieutenant in August 1914, with promotion to lieutenant coming in June 1916. In July 1917, he was promoted to captain, which was antedated to June 1916. He resigned his commission in February 1921, retaining the rank of captain.

A club cricketer for Peebles County, he made a single appearance in first-class cricket for Scotland against Wales at Swansea in 1924. Batting twice in the match, he was dismissed for 11 runs in the Scottish first innings by Helm Spencer, while in their second innings he was promoted to open the batting and was dismissed without scoring by the same bowler. He also bowled two wicketless overs with his left-arm bowling, costing 32 runs. Outside of cricket, he worked in the woollen manufacturing industry. Thorburn died at Edinburgh in May 1943. His nephew was the Middlesex cricketer Norman McCaskie.
