= Sergey Turbin =

Russian playwright and journalist

Sergey Ivanovich Turbin (Russian: Сергей Иванович Турбин; 1821–1884) was a Russian playwright and journalist.

== Biography ==
Turbin, was a Moscow University graduate; later he joined the Nikolyevskaya Academy to receive the military education and start the military career. He served in the Russian army as an artillery officer, then moved to the General Staff office in Saint Petersburg, then, in the rank of a Colonel joined the infantry.

Travelling on his missions all across Russia provided Turbin with a bulk of material for his subsequent literary career. Highly acclaimed were his Notes of an Old Artillery Man published in 1857 by Sovremennik, as well as the accounts of his travels over Siberia (Saint Petersburgs's Vedomosti, 1863-1865). A series of historical studies by Turbin were published by Russkaya Starina in 1871-1873. Popular in the late 19th century were the theatre productions of Turbin's plays: Two Mothers-in-Law (Свекровь и теща, 1864), A Sprightly Lady (Бойкая барыня, 1864), A Pansioner at the Station (Пансионерка на станции, 1871), The Image of Nature (Картинка с натуры, 1864), A Hostess and a Guest (Хозяйка и постоялец, 1871), A Tamer Woman (Укротительница, 1871).

Described as an eccentric "atheist thinker, critical of the Gospel," Turbin is considered to be the prototype of Forov, a character of Nikolay Leskov's At Daggers Drawn novel.
