= Robert L. Thoburn =

American Presbyterian minister and politician (1929–2012)

Member of the Virginia House of Delegates from the 19th district
- In office January 11, 1978 – January 9, 1980
- Preceded by: Thomas J. Rothrock
- Succeeded by: Larry Pratt

Personal details
- Born: Robert Loren Thoburn; May 19, 1929 Harrisville, Ohio, U.S.
- Died: December 23, 2012 (aged 83) Vienna, Virginia, U.S.
- Political party: Republican
- Spouse: Rosemary Sweet
- Children: 8
- Education: Muskingum College (AB); Westminster Theological Seminary (MDiv, ThM)
- Occupation: Minister; educator; politician

Robert Loren Thoburn (May 19, 1929 – December 23, 2012) was a Presbyterian minister, Virginia legislator, and founder of the Fairfax Christian School.

== Biography ==
Thoburn was born May 19, 1929, in Harrisville, Ohio, and was one of 11 children. He graduated from what is now Muskingum University and later Westminster Theological Seminary, and in 1955 he was ordained an Orthodox Presbyterian minister. He moved to Fairfax, Virginia, in 1959.

In 1961, he founded the Fairfax Christian School. In 1975, he wrote the book, How to Establish and Operate a Successful Christian School, based on his experiences founding numerous Christian schools.

In 1984, in his second book, The Christian and Politics, he argued that Christians should become more active in politics.

He ran for the US House of Representatives twice, in 1976 and 1978, failing both times. In 1977, he was elected to the Virginia House of Delegates as a Republican.

Thoburn was a member of the John Birch Society.

He died of cancer on December 23, 2012, at his home in Vienna. Surviving him were his wife of 60 years, 8 children, 46 grandchildren, and 19 great-grandchildren.
