= Skogstad =

Skogstad is a surname. Notable people with the surname include:

- Geir Arne Skogstad (born1973), Norwegian wheelchair curler
- Grace Skogstad, Canadian political scientist
- Herbjørn Skogstad (born 1946), Norwegian illustrator
- Morten Skogstad (born 1962), Norwegian drummer
- Norman C. Skogstad (1920–2001), United States Army Air Forces flying ace
- Bjørn Skogstad Aamo (1946–2023), Norwegian economist and politician
