= Torben Oxe =

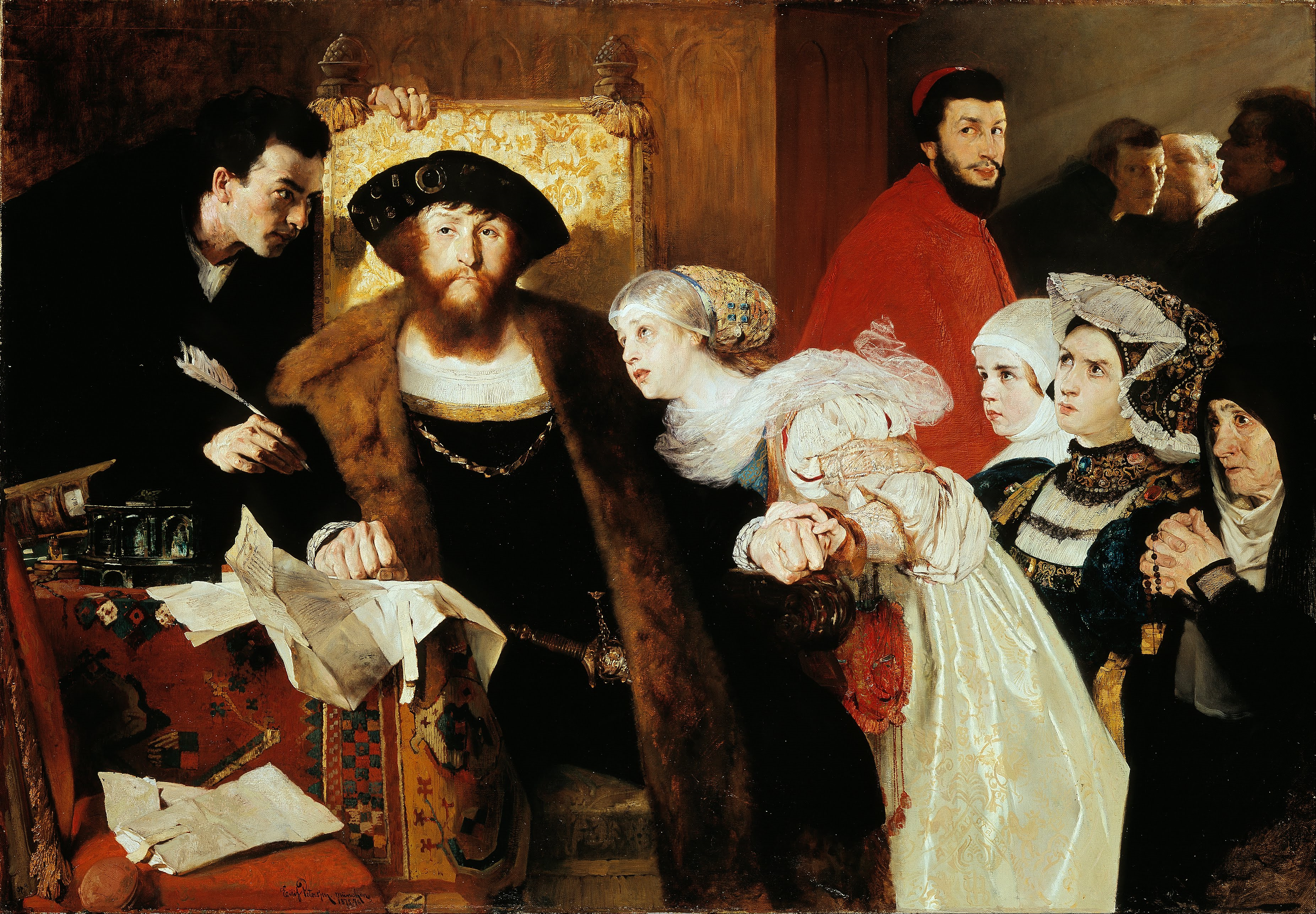
Christian II Signing the Death Warrant of Torben Oxe painting by Eilif Peterssen, 1875-76

Torben Oxe (died 29 November 1517) was a Danish nobleman and a member of an aristocratic family.

== Early life ==
Oxe was the son of Johan Oxe of Tordsø and Inger Torbensdatter Bille. Both his father and grandfather had served as Danish Councillors (dansk rigsråd). His nephew, Peder Oxe, would become the future Danish finance minister and Steward of the Realm.

== Career ==
Torben Oxe served as a liege man of King Christian II of Denmark, under whom from 1514, he was governor of Copenhagen Castle. He also inherited a fief in Kronborg from his father who died in 1490.

== Death ==
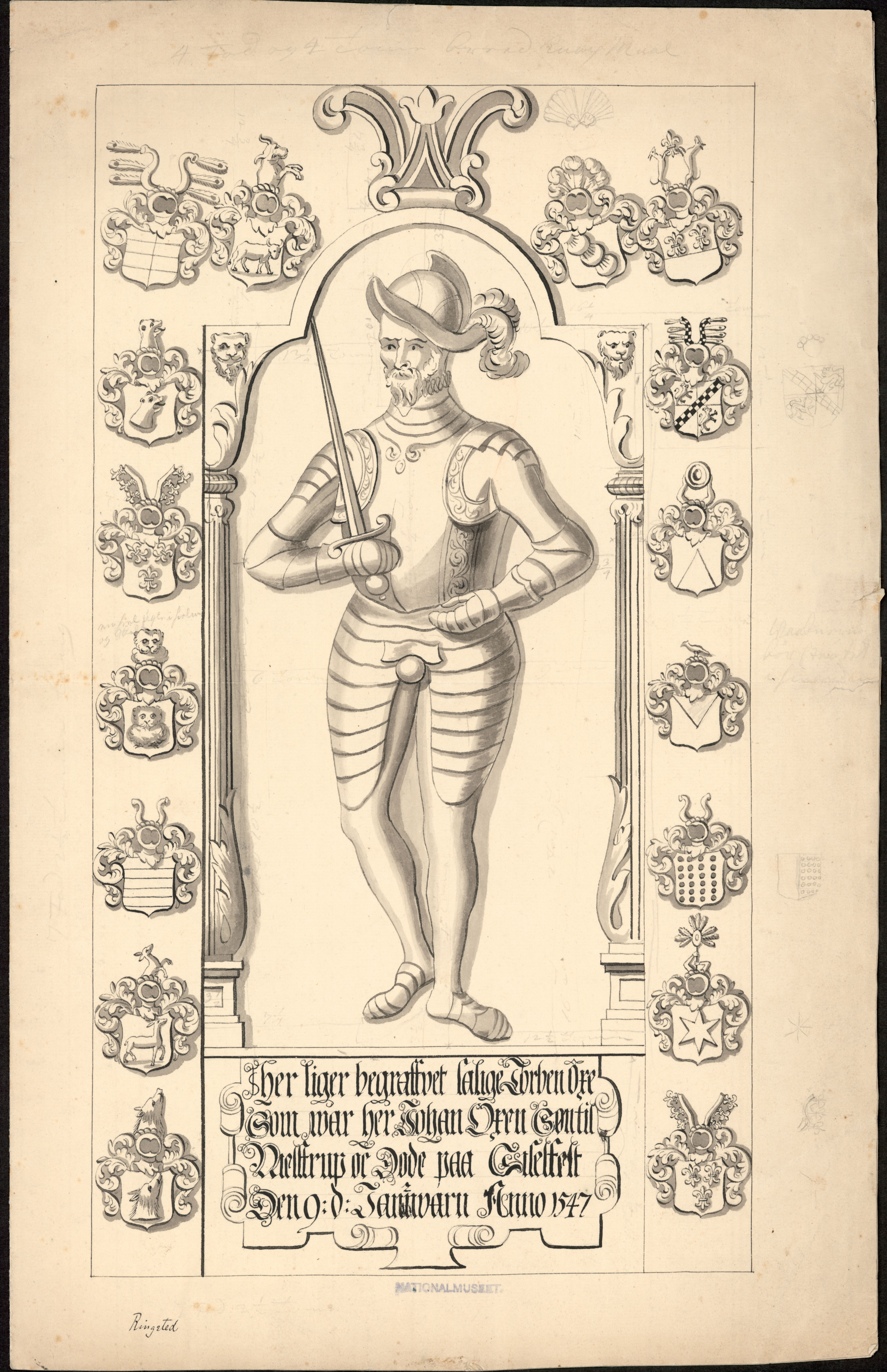
Abildgaard's drawing of Torben Oxe's tombstone in St. Bendt's Church, Ringsted.

During the summer of 1517, Torben Oxe was accused of murdering Dyveke Sigbritsdatter, King Christian II's mistress, with some poisoned cherries. Dyveke's mother Sigbrit Willoms, the widow of a Dutch merchant, acted as an advisor to the king, to the displeasure of much of the Danish nobility.

Torben Oxe was first tried and acquitted by the State Council. King Christian II did not accept the judgment and had Oxe indicted by a court consisting of a jury from Solbjerg outside Copenhagen. Oxe was charged in what amounted to a justice-of-the-peace court with vague offences against his liege lord, Christian II. The verdict as directed by the king was guilty and the death sentence imposed. He was condemned to death, traditionally in the words: "Vi dømmer ham ikke, men hans gerninger dømmer ham" (We do not condemn him - his deeds condemn him), and was beheaded and buried in the graveyard of St. Gertrude's Hospital (St Gertruds Kloster) in Copenhagen.

Members of the Royal Council of the State (Rigsraadet) disapproved of the execution of Oxe, who was a popular figure. The execution further alienated Christian II from the nobles and the people of Copenhagen. Thereafter the king lost no opportunity to suppress the nobility and raise commoners to power.

A famous painting by Eilif Peterssen titled Christian II Signing the Death Warrant of Torben Oxe is present in the National Museum of Art, Architecture and Design in Oslo, Norway.

== Other sources ==
- Lockhart, Paul Douglas Denmark, 1513-1660: the rise and decline of a Renaissance monarchy (Oxford University Press, 2007) ISBN 0-19-927121-6
- Bain, Robert Nisbet Scandinavia: a political history of Denmark, Norway and Sweden from 1513 to 1900 (Cambridge: University Press, 1905)
