= List of Norwegian artists =

This is a list of Norwegian artists listed by medium.

== Music artists ==
- A-ha
- Alan Walker
- Alessandra
- Angelina Jordan
- Ane Brun
- Anna of the North
- Astrid S
- Aurora
- Bel Canto
- Bertine Zetlitz
- Christian Ingebrigtsen
- Dagny
- Darkthrone
- Dimmu Borgir
- Donkeyboy
- Edvard Grieg
- Emmy
- Enslaved
- Espen Lind
- Fieh
- Flunk
- Girl in Red
- Highasakite
- Ina Wroldsen
- Ingebjørg Bratland
- Ingrid Olava
- Jakob (formerly Jakob Ogawa)
- Jaga Jazzist
- Karoline Krüger
- Kim André Larsen
- Kurt Nilsen
- Kygo
- Kyle Alessandro
- Leif Ove Andsnes
- Lene Marlin
- Lene Nystrøm of Danish-Norwegian band Aqua
- Lisa Stokke
- M2M
- Margaret Berger
- Mari Boine
- Maria Arredondo
- Maria Mena
- Maria Solheim
- Marion Raven
- Marit Larsen
- Martin Tungevaag
- Matoma
- Morten Harket
- Oslo Gospel Choir
- Röyksopp
- Satyricon
- Sigrid
- Sissel Kyrkjebø
- Susanne Sundfør
- Turbonegro
- Wardruna

== Painters ==
- Peder Aadnes (1739–1792), painter
- Martin Aagaard (1863–1913), painter
- Rolf Aamot (1934–2024), painter, film director, photographer and tonal-image composer
- Alf-Jørgen Aas (1915–1981), painter
- Betzy Akersloot-Berg (1850–1922), painter
- Peter Nicolai Arbo (1831–1892), painter, who specialized in painting historical motifs and images from Norse mythology
- Dina Aschehoug (1861–1956), painter
- Nikolai Astrup (1880–1928), painter
- Kjell Aukrust (1920–2002), author, poet, artist
- Marianne Aulie (born 1971), artist
- Harriet Backer (1845–1932), painter
- Peder Balke (1804–1887), landscape painter
- Tupsy Clement (1871–1959), landscape painter
- Hans Dahl (1849–1937), painter of landscapes and genre works
- Nirmal Singh Dhunsi (born 1960), painter
- Johan Christian Dahl (1788–1857), landscape painter
- Andreas Edvard Disen (1845–1923), landscape painter
- Ludvig Eikaas (1920–2010), painter and graphic designer
- Axel Ender (1853–1920), painter and sculptor
- Thorvald Erichsen (1868–1939), painter
- Bjarne Eriksen (1882–1970), painter, brother of Sigurd
- Sigurd Eriksen (1884–1976), painter, brother of Bjarne
- Liv Kristine Espenæs (born 1977), painter, singer
- Thomas Fearnley (1802–1842), romanticist landscape painter
- Kai Fjell (1907–1989), painter, printmaker and scenographer
- Johannes Flintoe (1787–1870), painter, known for his depiction of Norwegian landscapes, and scenes from Danish and Scandinavian history
- Paul René Gauguin (1911–1976), painter and graphic designer, grandson of Paul Gauguin
- Rolf Groven (born 1943), painter, known for his satirical art painted in figurative style
- Hans Gude (1825–1903), romanticist painter of landscapes
- Håkon Gullvåg (born 1959), painter of portraits
- DOT DOT DOT (artist) (born Oslo, Norway), visual, public and conceptual artist
- Carl von Hanno (1901–1953), painter, especially of seascapes
- Aasta Hansteen (1824–1908), painter, writer, and early feminist
- Karl Erik Harr (born 1940), painter, illustrator, graphic artist and author
- Jean Heiberg (1884–1976), painter and sculptor
- Thorvald Hellesen (1888–1937), painter and designer
- Lars Hertervig (1830–1902), painter
- Kristen Holbø (1869–1953), painter and illustrator
- Thorolf Holmboe (1866–1935), painter, illustrator, and designer
- Håvard Homstvedt (born 1976), painter
- Olaf Isaachsen (1835–1893), painter
- Lars Jorde (1865–1939), painter
- Theodor Kittelsen (1857–1914), painter especially of nature scenes and illustrations of fairy tales and legends
- Konrad Knudsen (1890–1959), painter, journalist, and parliamentarian
- Anne Krafft (born 1957), painter and photographer
- Christian Krohg (1852–1925), naturalist painter, illustrator, author and journalist
- Oda Krohg (1860–1935), painter
- Olaf Lange (1875–1965), painter and graphic designer
- Vincent Stoltenberg Lerche (1837–1892), painter and illustrator
- Dagny Tande Lid (1903–1998), painter and illustrator
- Jonas Lie (1880–1940), painter of the sea, channels, and ships
- Bjørg Lødøen (1931–2009), painter, graphics artist, and composer
- Ingrid Lønningdal (born 1981), contemporary artist
- Camilla Løw (born 1976), artist
- Charles Lundh (1856–1908), joined the Skagen Painters in 1883 and 1888
- Sverre Malling (born 1977), painter
- Edvard Munch (1863–1944), Symbolist painter, printmaker, and a forerunner of expressionistic art
- Odd Nerdrum (born 1944), figurative painter
- Rolf Nesch (1893–1975), expressionist painter and printmaker
- Kjell Nupen (1955–2014), painter and sculptor, known for his use of a particular shade of blue
- Wilhelm Peters (1851–1935), painter, participated in the Modern Breakthrough, one of the Skagen Painters
- Frederik Petersen (1759–1825), portrait painter
- Vebjørn Sand (born 1966), painter and artist
- Christiane Schreiber (1822–1898), portrait painter
- Otto Sinding (1842–1909), painter
- Ludvig Skramstad (1855–1912), landscape painter
- Christian Skredsvig (1854–1924), painter and writer
- Harald Sohlberg (1869–1935), neo-romantic painter especially of mountains of Rondane and the town of Røros
- Halvard Storm (1877–1964), 20th century artist/etcher of Norwegian landscapes, towns, and architecture
- Petar Tale (born 1947), painter
- Frits Thaulow (1847–1906), impressionist painter
- Adolph Tidemand (1814–1876), painter
- Bernt Tunold (1877–1946), landscape painter
- Emanuel Vigeland (1875–1948), artist of frescoes, stained glass and sculptures
- Gustav Rudolf Undersaker (1887–1972), painter, impressionist,
- Erik Werenskiold (1855–1938), painter and illustrator
- Oscar Wergeland (1844–1910) historical painter
- Herman Willoch (1892–1968), painter of frescoes
- Oluf Wold-Torne (1867–1919), painter
- Halfdan Egedius (1877–1899), painter

== Sculptors ==
- Nils Aas (1933–2004), sculptor and medalist, student of Per Palle Storm
- Guri Berg (born 1963), sculptor and artist
- Brynjulf Bergslien (1830–1898), sculptor
- Kari Buen (1938–2025), sculptor
- Sæbjørn Buttedahl (1876–1960), sculptor
- Kristian Kvakland (1927–2011), sculptor and artist
- Carl Nesjar (1920–2015), sculptor, painter and graphic designer
- Louise Nippierd (born 1962), body sculptor and metalwork artist
- Kjell Erik Killi Olsen (born 1952), painter and sculptor
- Nic Schiøll (1901–1984), sculptor and painter, known for the St. Halvard relief on Oslo City Hall and nine sculptures on the Nidaros Cathedral West Front
- Stephan Sinding (1846–1922), Norwegian-Danish sculptor
- Knut Steen (1924–2011), sculptor
- Per Palle Storm (1910–1994), naturalistic sculptor, Nils Aas' teacher
- Per Ung (1933–2013), sculptor and graphic designer
- Gustav Vigeland (1869–1943), sculptor
- Dyre Vaa (1903–1980), painter and sculptor
- Øystein Bernhard Mobråten (1940), sculptor

== Photographers ==
- Knut Bry (born 1946), photographer and author
- Cecilie Dahl (born 1960), photographer and installation artist
- Sverre M. Fjelstad (1930–2024), nature photographer
- Per Heimly (born 1972), photographer and editor
- Morten Krogvold (born 1950), portrait photographer
- Anders Beer Wilse (1865–1949), photographer
- Ann Lislegaard (born 1962), installations, animations, moving image, sound, light

== Textile artists ==
- Synnøve Anker Aurdal (1908–2000), textile artist
- Ragna Breivik (1891–1965), tapestry artist
- Ulrikke Greve (1868–1951), tapestry artist
- Frida Hansen (1855–1931), art nouveau textile artist
- Else Marie Jakobsen (1927–2012), textile artist and designer¨
- Else Poulsson (1909–2002), painter and textile artist
- Hannah Ryggen (1894–1970), Swedish-born Norwegian textile artist

== Cartoonists ==
- Kaare Bratung (1906–1985), comic strip creator
- Mads Eriksen (born 1977), cartoonist for the comic strips M and Gnom
- Karine Haaland (born 1966), comic strip creator, animator and illustrator, of the comic strip Piray
- Jason (born 1965), cartoonist of anthropomorphic animal characters
- Kjersti Synneva Moen (born 1995), cartoonist and illustrator
- Lise Myhre (born 1975), cartoonist of Nemi
- Christopher Nielsen (born 1963), comics artist especially of subcultural depictions
- Knut Nærum (born 1961), comedian, author, comics writer and TV-entertainer
- Frode Øverli (born 1968), comic strip cartoonist

== Graphic designers ==
- Siri Aurdal (1937–2026), painter, graphic designer, and sculptor
- Per Inge Bjørlo (born 1952), sculptor, painter, graphic designer, and visual artist
- Gro Pedersen Claussen (born 1941), graphic designer and textile designer
- Runa Førde (1933–2017), painter, illustrator, and graphic artist
- Torunn Grønbekk (born 1984), comics writer, graphic designer, and portrait painter
- Kim Hiorthøy (born 1973), electronic musician, graphic designer, illustrator, filmmaker, and writer
- Solveig Hisdal (born 1946), graphic designer and fashion designer
- Stian Hole (born 1969), graphic designer, illustrator, and writer of children's books
- Arild Kristo (1939–2010), photographer, graphic designer, actor, and filmmaker
- Martin Kvamme (born 1975), graphic designer and illustrator
- Johan Nordhagen (1856–1956), painter, graphic artist, and educator
- Vivian Zahl Olsen (born 1942), artist, graphic designer, and illustrator
- Kari Stai (born 1974), illustrator, graphic designer, and writer
- Kåre Thomsen (born 1959), jazz musician and graphic designer

== Architects ==
- Christian Fürst
- Jon Jerde (1940–2015), American architect of Norwegian descent

== Collage artists ==
- Frida Orupabo (born 1986)
