= Lundh =

Lundh is a surname. Notable people with the surname include:

- Alexander Lundh (born 1986), Swedish motorcycle racer
- Anna Lundh (born 1987), Swedish television personality, adventurer and model
- Carl Lundh (1866–1942), Norwegian barrister
- Charles Lundh (1856–1908), Norwegian painter
- Daniel Lundh, Franco-Swedish actor and writer
- Emma Lundh (born 1989), Swedish footballer
- Fredrik Lundh Sammeli (born 1977), Swedish politician
- Gregers Lundh (1786–1836), Norwegian military officer and academic
- Henrik Lundh (1894–1985), Norwegian civil servant
- Jonas Lundh (born 1965), Swedish abstract expressionist artist
- Nils Lundh (1921–2005), Swedish ski jumper
- Olof Lundh (born 1966), Swedish sports journalist
- Patrik Lundh (born 1988), Swedish ice hockey player
- Per Lundh (born 1958), Swedish sprint canoer
- Stephan Lundh (born 1959), Swedish hockey coach
- Yngve Lundh (1924–2017), Swedish cyclist
