= Skramstad =

Skramstad is a surname. Notable people with the surname include:

- Halvor Skramstad Lunn (born 1980), Norwegian snowboarder
- Hans Skramstad (1797–1839), Norwegian pianist
- Ludvig Skramstad (1855–1912), Norwegian landscape painter
- Olaf Skramstad (1894–1956), Norwegian politician
- Trond Skramstad (born 1960), Norwegian decathlete
