= Bjarne Eriksen =

Bjarne Eriksen is the name of:

- Bjarne Eriksen (businessman) (1886–1976), Norwegian businessperson and Olympic fencer
- Bjarne Eriksen (painter) (1882–1970), Norwegian painter
