= Gullvåg =

Gullvåg is a surname. Notable people with the surname include:

- Eigil Gullvåg (1921–1991), Norwegian newspaper editor and politician
- Håkon Gullvåg (born 1959), Norwegian painter
- Olav Gullvåg (1885–1961), Norwegian playwright, novelist, poet, and editor
- Steinar Gullvåg (born 1946), Norwegian politician
