= DOT DOT DOT (artist) =

Norwegian graffiti artist

- Born: Oslo, Norway
- Known for: Street art; Graffiti; Visual Art; Public Art; Conceptual Art; Satire; Social commentary
- Style: Stencil, graffiti
- Website: dotdotdot.no

Tag

DOT DOT DOT (also styled "...", ooo or DOTDOTDOT) is the pseudonym of an anonymous Norwegian visual, public and conceptual artist, well known in the street art scene.

His work has been displayed in galleries around the world, and in cities such as Oslo, Copenhagen, Berlin, Paris, Málaga, Los Angeles, Miami, New York City, Tokyo, Bangkok and more. DOT DOT DOT's age and real name are not publicly known.

== Biography ==
DOT DOT DOT was born in Oslo, Norway. He first started as a graffiti artist in the late 90s. He operated under several different pseudonyms over the years. In 2000 he started creating stencil art, but continued creating conventional graffiti works. DOT DOT DOT first gained notice for painting a rat in the town of Sandvika, outside Oslo.

DOT DOT DOT appeared on TV channel NRK talking about the street art movement together with Martin Berdahl Aamundsen from Kontur Forlag, before the release of the book Street Art Norway Vol. 2.

DOT DOT DOT participated at LandArt in October 2012, curated by Norwegian artists Mari Meen Halsøy and Kine Lillestrøm, in Romerike/Gjerdrum, just outside Oslo. In October 2012 DOT DOT DOT together with ARD (All Rights Destroyed) started the ARD*POP-UP Festival in Oslo, inviting national and international artists to decorate walls throughout the city.

== See also ==
- List of Norwegian artists
- Hyperrealism (visual arts)
- List of street artists
- List of pseudonyms
