= Carl Lundh =

Norwegian lawyer

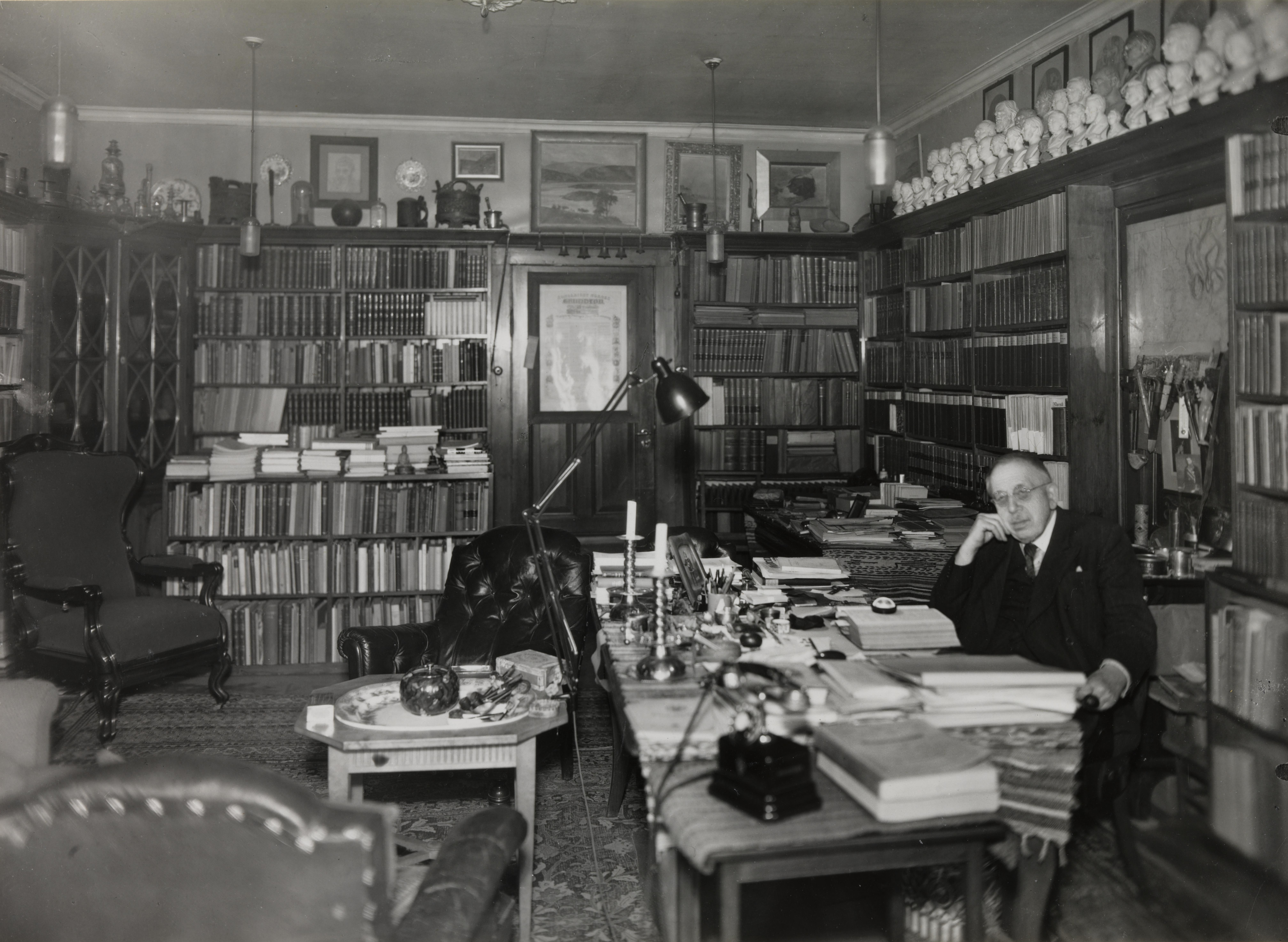
Carl Lundh in his library

Carl Gottlob Fredrik Lundh (26 December 1866 – 1942) was a Norwegian barrister. He was involved in the 1910s and 1920s with the Norwegian preparations to take sovereignty over Svalbard, and also in several business ventures.

== Personal life ==
He was born in Kristiania as a son of Otto Carl Claudius Gregers Lundh (1833–1896). He was a grandson of Gregers Lundh and nephew of Christopher Anker Bergh Lundh and Sverrer H. Lundh.

== Career ==
He finished his secondary education in 1885, and took the cand.jur. degree in 1890. He was then a junior solicitor, and from 1895 he was a barrister with access to working with Supreme Court cases. He started his own law firm in 1896, and partnered up with different lawyers before his firm was merged with Ch. C. Platou og Jens P. Heyerdahl in 1921. He was a board member of the Norwegian Bar Association and chaired the Oslo branch.

He was heavily involved in the Norwegian endeavors to win sovereignty over Svalbard. He was a member of an advisory committee set up by the Ministry of Church Affairs in 1918, and from 1919 he was the deputy chairman of a committee for the preparation of Svalbard's transfer to Norway. He also joined committees that prepared laws for Svalbard regarding mining, taxes and excise between 1919 and 1923. Between 1924 and 1925 he chaired the naming commission for places in Svalbard. He was also involved in the archipelago's business, as chairman of the board of Store Norske Spitsbergen Kulkompani from 1916 to 1927; he later chaired the supervisory council.

He was the chairman of the Norwegian Students' Society in 1898, Sydvaranger from 1908 to 1926 (board member since 1906), a central board member of the Norwegian Employers' Confederation from 1913 to 1917, and a board member of Bjørkaasen Gruber and a charitable foundation set up by Westye Egeberg. He chaired the supervisory council of Sydvaranger (1927–), Nationaltheatret (1923–1929, council member from 1907 to 1930), Nylands Verksted (1920–) and Rørsand Gruber; and was a supervisory council member of Christiania Theater (deputy chair), Klaveness Bank (deputy chair 1922–1925) and Elektrokemisk.

He was decorated as a Knight of the Order of St. Olav and a Commander, Second Class of the Order of Vasa. He died in 1942.
