= Petar Tale =

Norwegian painter (born 1947)

Petar Tale (born August 15, 1947) is a Norwegian painter.

He was born Petar Pavicevic in Montenegro but has been living in Norway since 1977. Tale's artwork consists of drawings, watercolours and paintings. The motifs are both figurative — landscapes, people — and non-figurative. He established Lillestrøm kunstmuseum — Tale Art Museum in the mid 1980s.
