= Louise Nippierd =

British-Norwegian jewelry designer

- Born: Louise Nippierd; 16 January 1962 (age 64); Working in Oslo, Norway
- Known for: Jewellery Designer, Sculptor
- Awards: see the Awards section of this article

Louise Nippierd (born 16 January 1962) is a British-Norwegian metal-and-jewellery artist, living in Oslo, Norway.

== Biography ==
Louise Nippierd was born and raised in England and moved to Norway with her Norwegian journalist mother and English father in 1967. Her father was a Commander in the Royal Navy on a 3-year contract with NATO in Bærum. During her first two years in Norway, Nippierd attended St. George's British School in Bærum, while her three siblings continued on at different boarding schools in England. In 1969 the family decided to stay in Norway, and Nippierd started at Smestad Primary School in Oslo, where several members of the Norwegian royal family, including King Harald V and Crown Prince Haakon Magnus, have also been pupils.

Nippierd took a goldsmith course in 1990 at the Elvebakken videregående skole College, and in 1991 she enrolled at the Metal Department of the Norwegian National Academy of Craft and Art Industry (now Oslo National Academy of the Arts), where she gained a master's degree in 1996. Also in 1996, she founded the studio community NB 13, which she ran for 10 years and shared with other artist colleagues, including Andrew J. Barton. Between 1997 and 2005 Nippierd was a guest teacher at the Oslo National Academy of the Arts, teaching courses in anodizing aluminium.

Nippierd's works have been purchased by several institutions, including Norsk Kulturråd Arts Council Norway. and a commission for two small sculptures for the Royal Caribbean cruise ship Jewel of the Seas.

== Artistic outlook ==
Jewellery has traditionally been marketed purely in an aesthetic and decorative function, but Louise Nippierd also gives her jewellery an inherent ambiguity as the carrier of a deeper message. Her projects have a socio-political dimension, touching on issues such as racism, homosexuality, animal rights and eating disorders. She attributes her concern with the marginalized groups in society to her own marginalized childhood as an English-speaking child in Norway.

== Artistic materials ==
Nippierd first started working with aluminium in 1994 and was very quickly fascinated by all the possibilities this material has, due to its light weight and ability to be coloured by anodizing. She specialised in this medium in her master's degree work and has subsequently gained an international reputation for her large anodized aluminium body-sculptures. Nippierd's use of imitation fur as an artistic material serves to highlight her opposition to the cruelty of the fur trade and the use of animal fur in art and fashion.

== Awards and grants ==
- 2002:
  - Oslo Bys Kulturpris, Oslo Kommune – Oslo City Cultural Award.
- 2004:
  - Norwegian Goldsmiths' Association "Smykk Meg 2004" Design Competition – first prize.
- 2006:
- Statens materialstipend, Kulturdepartementet – (Norwegian) National Material Grant for Artists
- Utstillingsstipend, Norsk Kulturråd – Exhibition Grant for Artists, Arts Council Norway

== Group exhibitions ==
1992: "Ring frei", International ring exhibition

- Galerie Zebra, Düsseldorf, (Germany)

1996: "Subjects 96" International jewellery art

- Retretti Galleri, Punkaharju, (Finland)

2001–2003: "2. Nordic Jewellery Triennial", Touring exhibition

- Röhsska Museum, Gothenburg (Sweden) 24 November 2001 – 27 January 2002
- Museum of Applied Art Tallinn, Tallinn (Estonia) 23 February – 14 April 2002
- Lahti City Museum, Lahti (Finland) 4 May – 6 June 2002
- Kunstindustrimuseet, København (Denmark) 16 August – 29 September 2002
- Hafnarborg Kulturcenter, Hafnarfjörður (Iceland) 9–24 November 2002
- Sørlandet Art Museum, Kristiansand (Norway) 15 February – 23 March 2003

2002: Julekalender på Oslo S (Christmas Tree Advent Calendar in Oslo Central Station)

- 1–24 December

2004: "Nordic Cool: Hot Women Designers"

- National Museum of Women in the Arts, Washington, D.C. (USA) 23 April – 12 November

2004: "Vakre bord- Design i tiden" ("Beautiful Tables-Today's Design")

- Oslo City Museum, Oslo (Norway)

2004–2005: "Schmuck aus Norwegen"

- Grassi Museum für angewandte Kunst, Leipzig (Germany) 25 November 2004 – 27 February 2005

2005: "Maker-Wearer-Viewer", International, Touring exhibition

- The Mackintosh Gallery, Glasgow (Scotland) 5 March – 12 April
- The Scottish Gallery, Edinburgh (Scotland) 1–29 June
- Galerie Marzee, Nijmegen (Netherlands) 3 October – 24 November

2005–2006: "Conceptual Crafts: New Art from Norway", Touring exhibition, England

- Usher Gallery, Lincoln
- Harley Gallery, Worksop
- Gallery Oldham, Oldham 20 August – 12 November

2005–2006: "Norwegian Contemporary Crafts", Touring exhibition, UK

- Flow Gallery, London, (England) 17 February – 3 April 2005
- The Scottish Gallery, Edinburgh (Scotland)
- Clotworthy Arts Centre, Antrim (Northern Ireland)
- Oriel Myrddin Gallery, Carmarthen (Wales)

2007: "SMUKT!" ("GORGEOUS!") Norwegian Jewellery from the 21st Century.

- Nord Norsk Kunstnersenter (North Norwegian Regional Art Center) 22 June – 26 August

2008–2009: "Artitude – kroppsmykker"

- Kunstbanken, Hamar (Norway) 15 November 2008 – 11 January 2009

2009: "Irreverent: Contemporary Nordic Craft Art"

- Yerba Buena Center for the Arts, San Francisco (USA) 23 January – 12 April

2011: "Hodepryd og øyenslyst" ("Fancy Headgear and Delights for the Eye")

- Oslo City Hall Gallery, Oslo, Norway. Guest exhibitor with the Norwegian Hatmakers 10th Anniversary Jubilee.

== Themed solo exhibitions ==
1997: Master's Degree "New Talents" Exhibition "With sensuous signals shall the body be adorned" (Homosexuality)

- Museum of Decorative Arts and Design, Oslo (Norway)

1999: "Cross" (Eating disorders)

- Expo Arte Smykkegalleri, Oslo (Norway) 10 September – 16 October

2001: "Incognito" (Islamic)

- Rogaland Kunstnersenter, (Regional Art Center) Stavanger, (Norway) 13 September – 18 October

2002: "SeaSons" (Water)

- Bærum Kunsthåndverk, Bærum (Norway) 23 February – 24 March

2002–2004: "All different All equal" (Anti-racism)

- KunstnerSenteret i Buskerud, (Regional Art Center) Drammen (Norway) 12 October – 9 November 2002
- Haugesund Art Gallery, Haugesund (Norway) 14 September – 5 October 2003
- Galleri Texas, Ås (Norway) 7 February 2003 – 4 March 2004

2003: "Zoo" (Animal rights & anti-fur)

- Hå gamle prestegård, (art gallery), Hå, (Norway)

2007: "As time goes by" (Fashion & history)

- Møre og Romsdal Kunstnersenter (Regional Art Center) Molde, (Norway) 9 June – 8 July
- Galleri Harald Kjeldaas, Oslo, (Norway)
