= Sverre Malling =

Norwegian visual artist

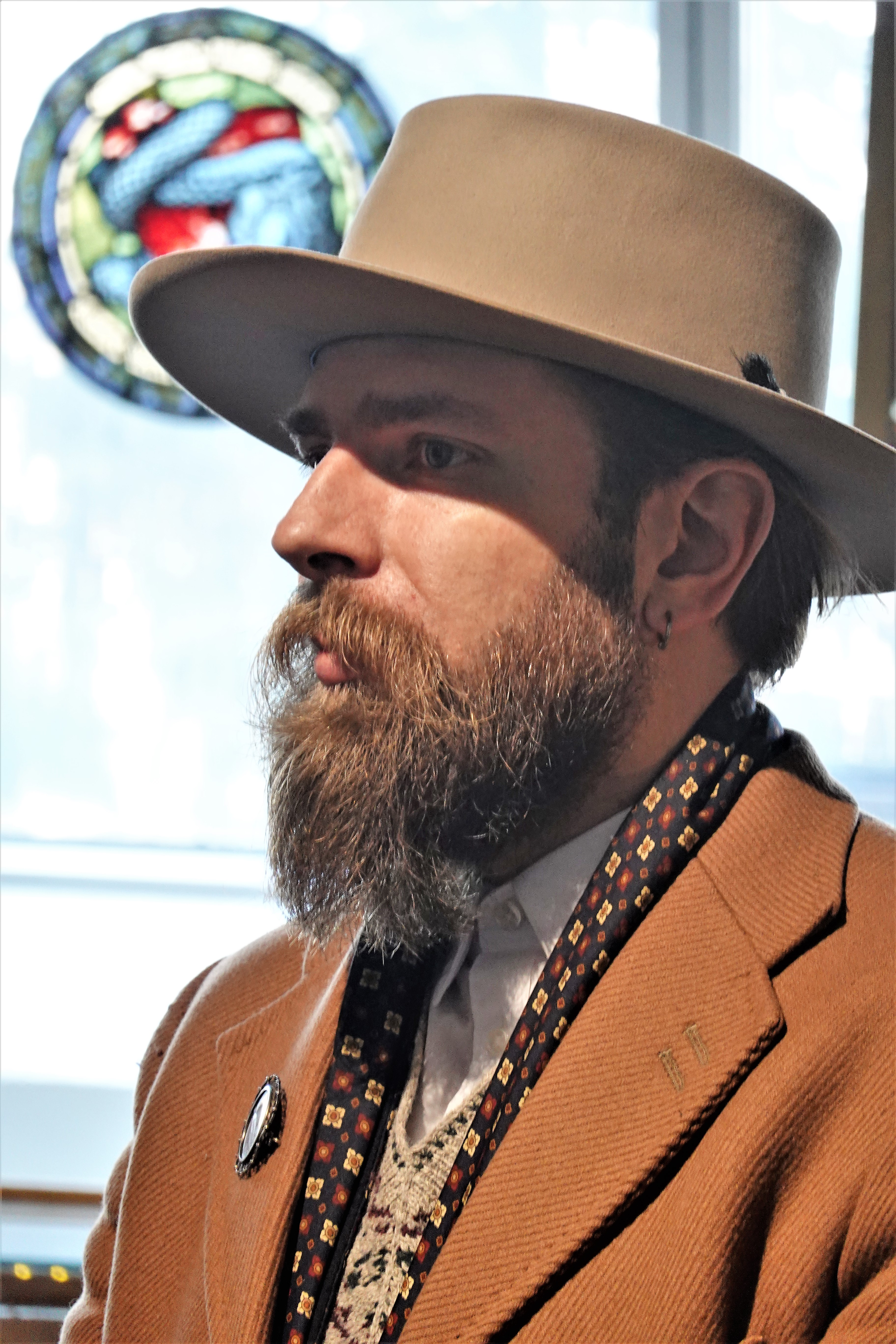
Sverre Malling in February 2020.

Sverre Malling (born 4 September 1977) is a Norwegian visual artist. His work references classical art, botany, the occult, psychedelia, folk art and children’s illustrations.

After an early debut at Oslo’s Høstutstillingen exhibition at 17, he went on to study at Einar Granum’s school of art (1996–97), SHKS (1997–2000) and the Norwegian National Academy of Fine Arts (2000–2004). He has sold works to the National Gallery of Norway, the Nordnorsk Kunstmuseum and Drammen Museum.

A recipient of the Jakob Weidemann-scholarship in 2009, Malling worked and boarded at the late artist’s farm in Lillehammer, concluding his year-long tenancy with a solo exhibition at Lillehammer Kunstmuseum as well as another, called "The Piper's Call" (after one of his works), at the Galleri Haaken in Oslo. "The Piper's Call" exhibition contained artwork that "challenges the viewer to reflect on the good and evil," according to one review. Malling made his fifth appearance at Høstutstillingen in 2010, as well as a solo exhibition at the Kunstnerforbundet in Oslo. In 2011, Malling had another solo exhibition called "The Seasons Have No Fear," at the Galleri Thomassen in Gothenburg. The exhibition featured drawings representing the banality of popular culture, exemplified in works such as Malling's "Hotel California Postcard".

In 2021, Malling held his first solo exhibition in London. "Adieu to Old England" opened at Kristin Hjellegjerde Gallery where he showed works inspired by the forgotten artist Austin Osman Spare.
