= Charles Lundh =

Norwegian painter

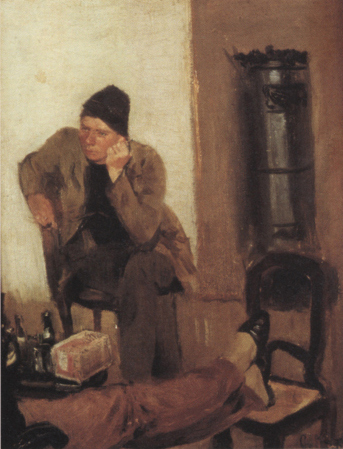
Christian Krohg: Portrait of Charles Lund (1883)

Charles Lundh (1856–1908) was a Norwegian painter who is remembered for joining the Skagen Painters, who had created an artists' colony at Skagen in the north of Jutland, Denmark towards the end of the 19th century. Lundh spent the summers of 1883 and 1889 in Skagen. During his first visit, he lived together with Christian Krohg and the Swedish painters Johan Krouthén and Oscar Björck in the house on Markvej which Michael Ancher and his wife Anna bought in 1884. Lundh became Helga Ancher's godfather at her Christening in October 1883.

In 1883, Lundh travelled to Persia, where he remained until his return to Skagen in 1888. There are, however, no records of his paintings from 1888. After his second stay in Skagen, he abandoned painting and turned to forestry.
