= Johan Krouthén =

Swedish artist (1858–1932)

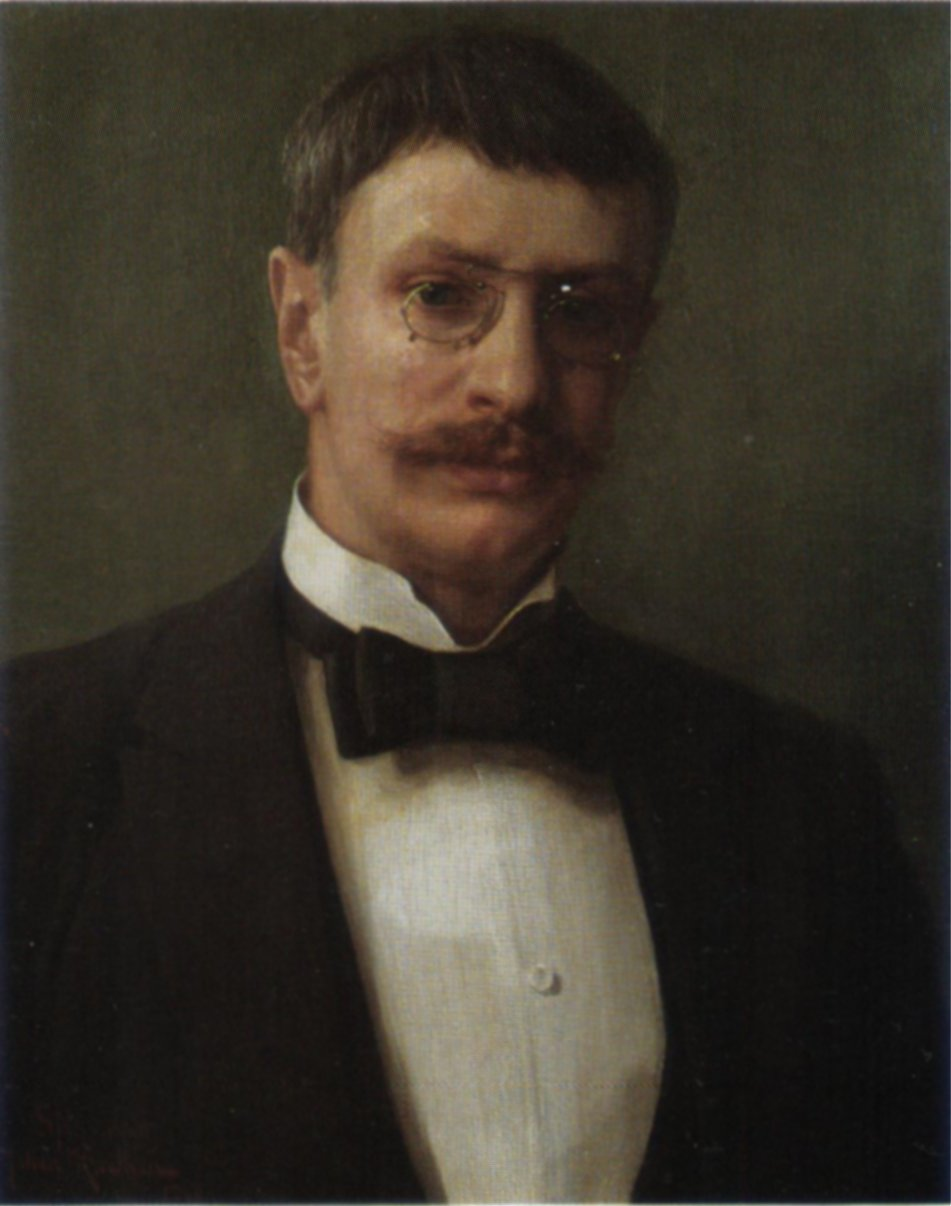
Johan Krouthén, Self portrait, 1904

Johan Krouthén (2 November 1858 – 19 December 1932) was a Swedish artist. He broke away from the traditions of the Swedish Academy, turning to Realism and Idealism. Immediately after his studies, he spent a few months in Paris and in Denmark where he associated with the Skagen Painters. Back in Sweden he painted pictures of gardens and portraits of local people.

== Early life ==
Krouthén, the son of Conrad Krouthén, a merchant, and Hilda Atkins, was born in Linköping. The Krouthén family, from Norrköping, had worked for generations as pewterers.

When he was 14, Krouthén left school and started an apprenticeship with Svante Leonard Rydholm, a photographer and artist, where he learnt the basic skills of both painting and photography. In 1875, at the age 16, he joined the Royal Swedish Academy of Arts in Stockholm where he studied drawing, portrait painting and landscaping. In addition to his education at the Academy, he was also taught by Swedish artist Edvard Perséus, who was skeptical of formal instruction and encouraged his students to paint naturally.

Krouthén became acquainted with Oscar Björck and Anders Zorn who also studied at the Art Academy. In the autumn of 1881, when the Academy president, Georg von Rosen, warned Zorn that he was not following the academy's prescribed curriculum, he promptly replied that he would leave. Krouthén, who happened to come into the president's office at the time, also said he would leave.

== Career ==
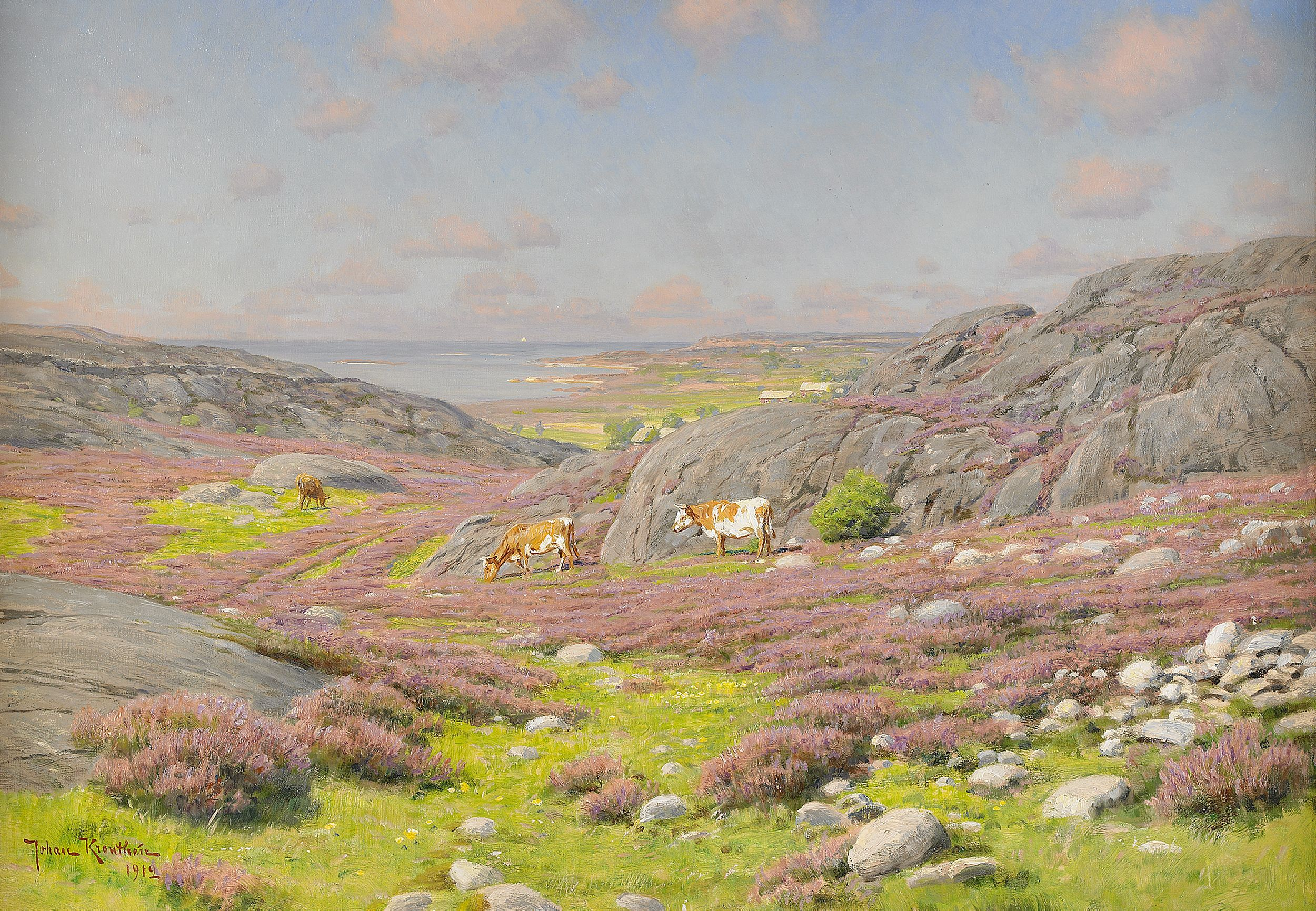
Scene from Halland north coast (1912)

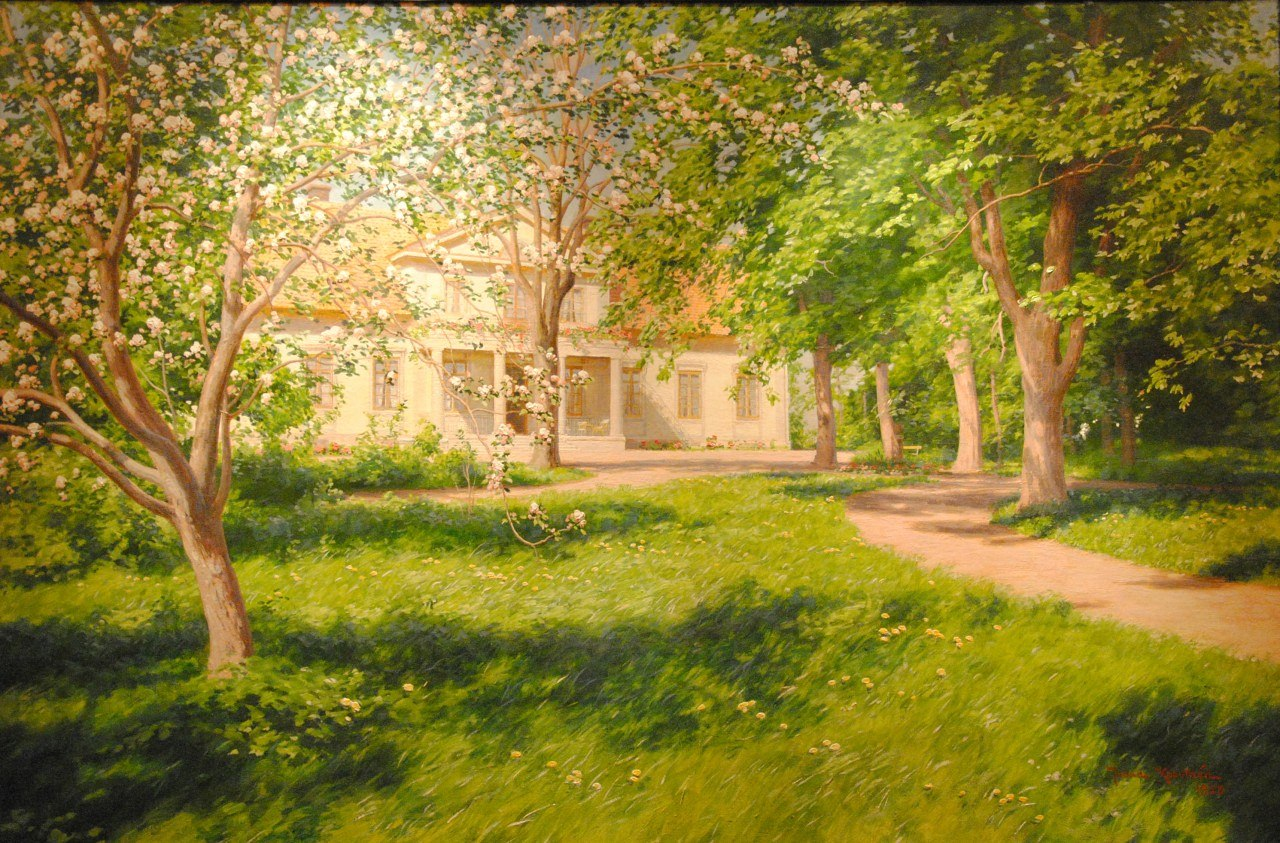
Manor house at Harvestad, 1923

In 1881, Krouthén spent a short period in Paris, a popular destination for Swedish artists in the 1880s, but he soon returned to Sweden where he painted in Scania and in Bohuslän with its rocky landscapes. His painting of a desolate landscape with a barefoot boy on a dirt track was exhibited in Stockholm in 1883, arousing considerable attention as a result of its realistic, unembellished look.

In the summer of 1883, he joined Oscar Björck at Skagen in the north of Jutland, where there was a small colony of artists from Denmark, Norway and Sweden. He stayed there from May until at least October. The Skagen Painters advocated artistic Naturalism. Instead of groups of weathered fishermen, Krouthén painted landscapes of the flat desolate Grenen beaches.

After Skagen, Krouthén returned to Linköping and continued to paint landscapes. In 1884, he met the then 18-year-old Hulda Ottosson at Linköping Castle where she was in a beauty contest. Krouthén is said to have been enthralled by her beauty, and she became his first model. They married in 1886 but their first child died at birth the same year. In 1891, Hulda gave birth to twins but died during the delivery. It was not easy to make a living from art in Linköping but Krouthén ensured an income by organizing a number of art lotteries with his paintings as prizes and by painting private gardens in the area.

The painting Spring in the garden (1886) depicts Linköping's Biskopträdgården. It is based on a photograph Krouthén took of the scene. The painting originally included both a man and a woman but the man was painted over and a quince bush was added. When exhibited at the Salon in Paris in 1889, the painting earned Krouthén a gold medal. Several other Swedish artists received awards at the Salon, which represented a breakthrough for the Impressionists. A comparison between the photograph and the finished painting shows that Krouthén abandoned Realism in favour of Idealism. He was not content with reality without adding light and shade. When interviewed, Krouthén explained that a painter must skillfully and accurately paint nature at its best.

During the 1880s he began painting portraits and interiors. Just as in his garden paintings, his interiors often include completely passive figures. One of the most famous is a painting showing librarian Erik Hjalmar Segerstéen, in his home. Segerstéen was one of Krouthén's patrons, and the painting shows him surrounded by his art collection, including works by Krouthén. Following the death in childbirth of his wife Hulda in 1891, Krouthén and his children moved to the Gottfridsberg district of Linköping. In 1902 he married Clara Söderlund. During the 1890s he became increasingly well-known, receiving many painting assignments, including portraits of famous Linköpingers. He was also hired to do paintings for churches, including altarpieces for Kärna Church, Vånga Church, and St. Laurence Church in Linköping.

Krouthén's later career, with paintings of red wooden cottages and flowering trees, was rather uninteresting from an artistic point of view. In 1909 he moved to Stockholm with his family, acquiring a studio at Valhallavägen. He exhibited quite often in Stockholm, his main clientele continuing to be from the Linköping area. He was not particularly interested in contemporary art, explaining: "Art and culture have deteriorated tremendously. Modern art is neither art nor modern. All the isms people talk about are pretty pointless if they are no more than an imitation of traditional art with a lower level of culture."

He often repainted the same scenes as his efforts to support his family made him turn to what his clients wanted. The loss of his beautiful wife Hulda is also said to have affected his painting in the years after her death.

Krouthén often returned to Linköping. For the 80th anniversary of the Stora Hotel in 1932, he was working on a number of large paintings. A week before Christmas, he suffered a stroke and was found dead in his hotel room.

== Paintings ==
Erik Hjalmar Segerstéen's art collection was later bought by Pehr Swartz who donated it to the Norrköping Museum of Art. Östergötland's County Museum in Linköping also has a large collection of Krouthén's works.

== Gallery ==
Johan Krouthén's works

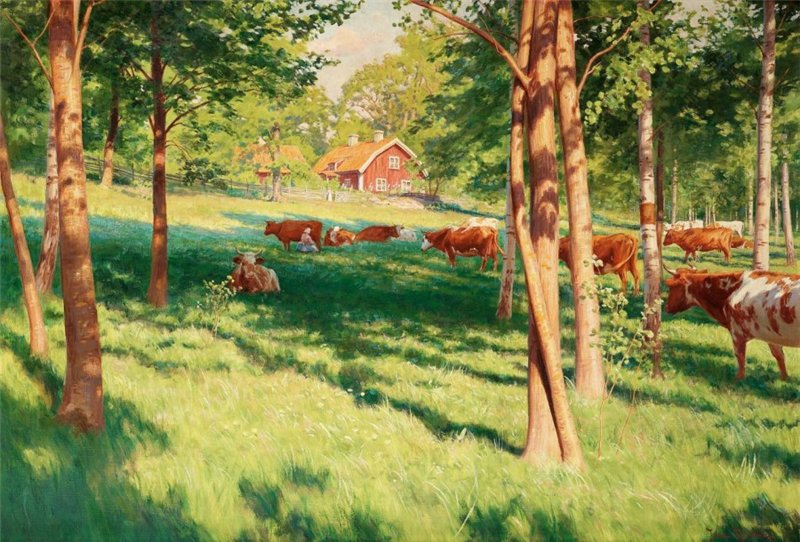
Landscape

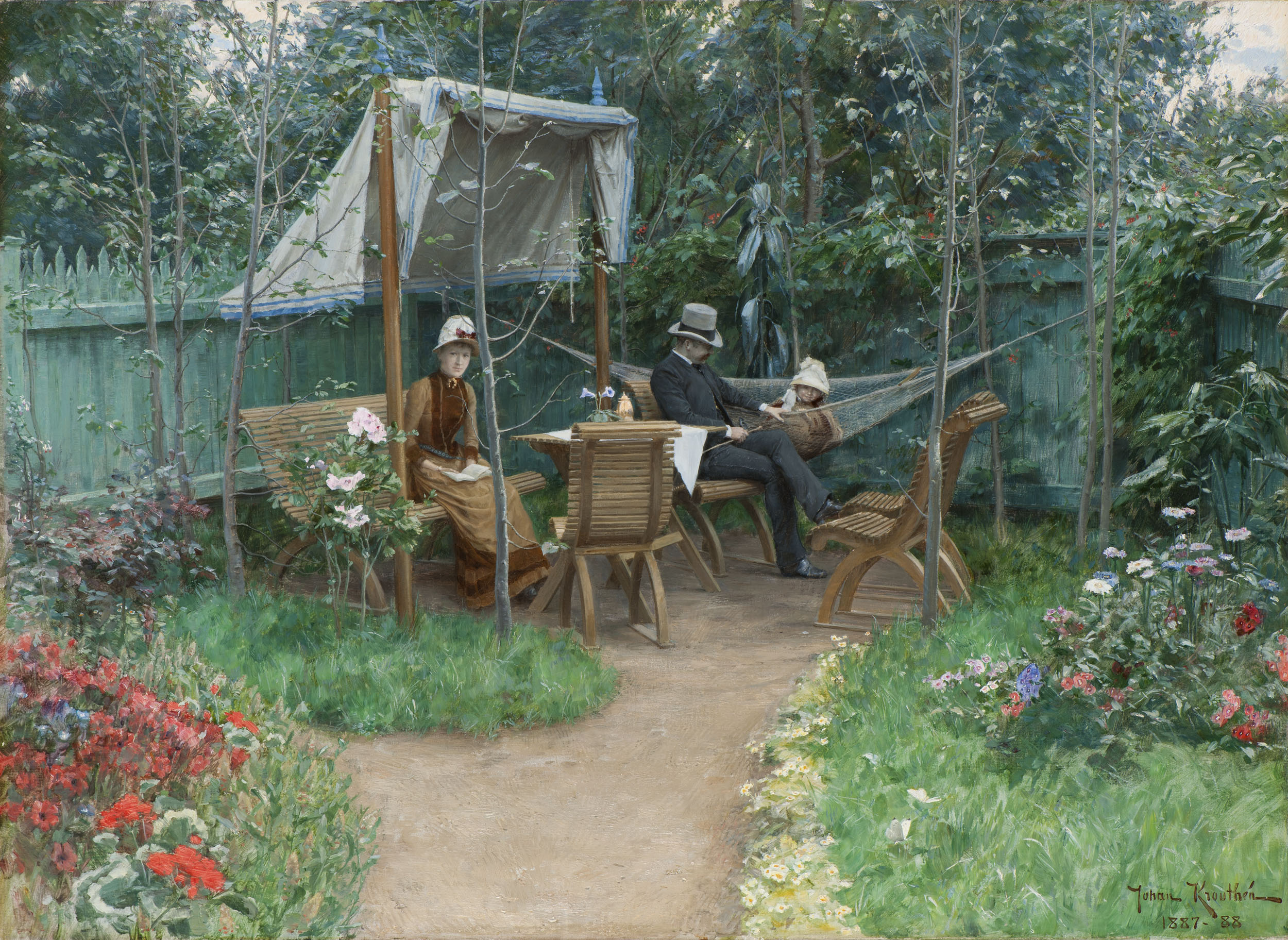
Garden in Linköping

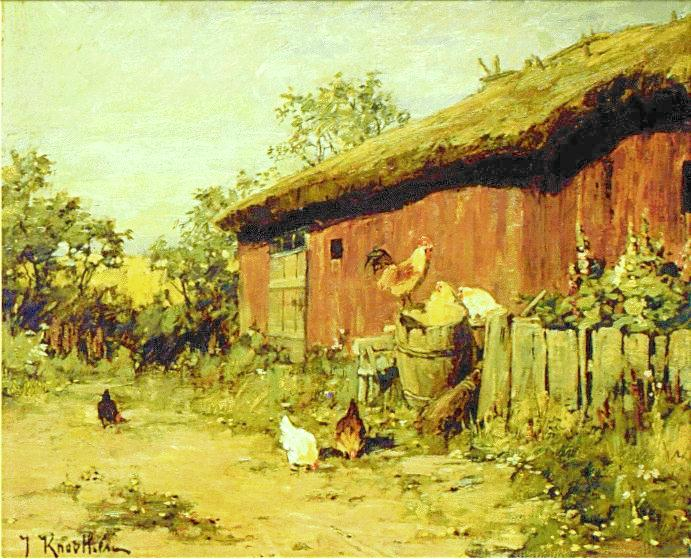
Hens behind the cowshed (1885)

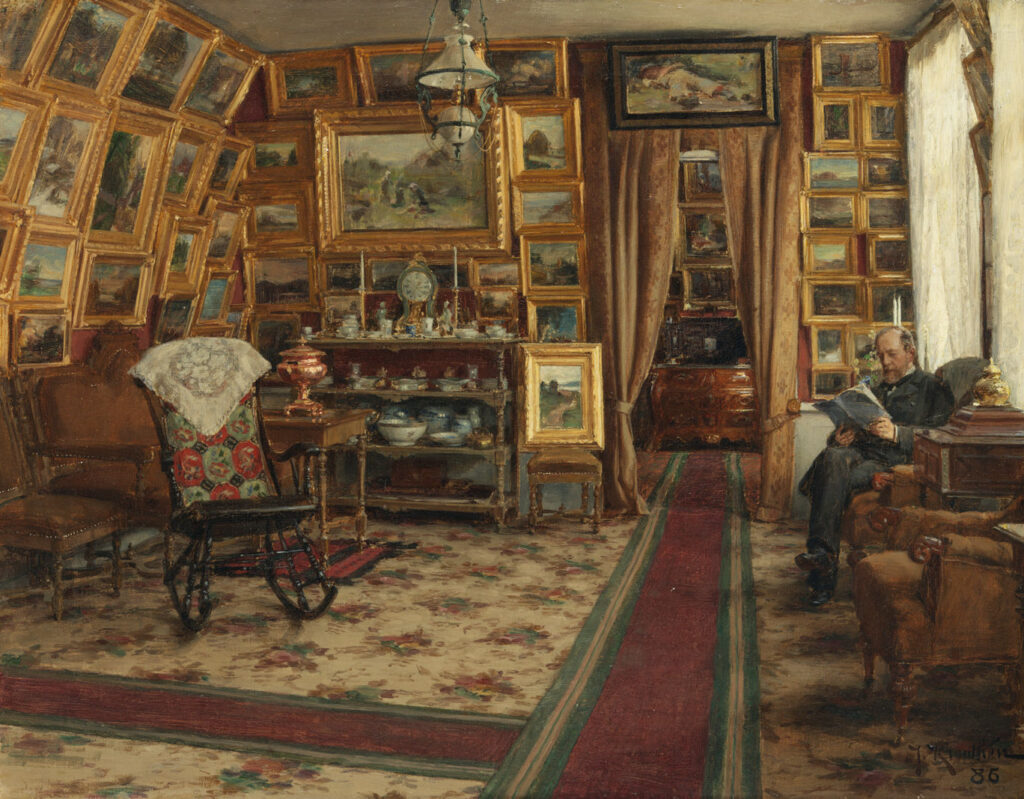
Librarian Segerstéen in his home (1886)

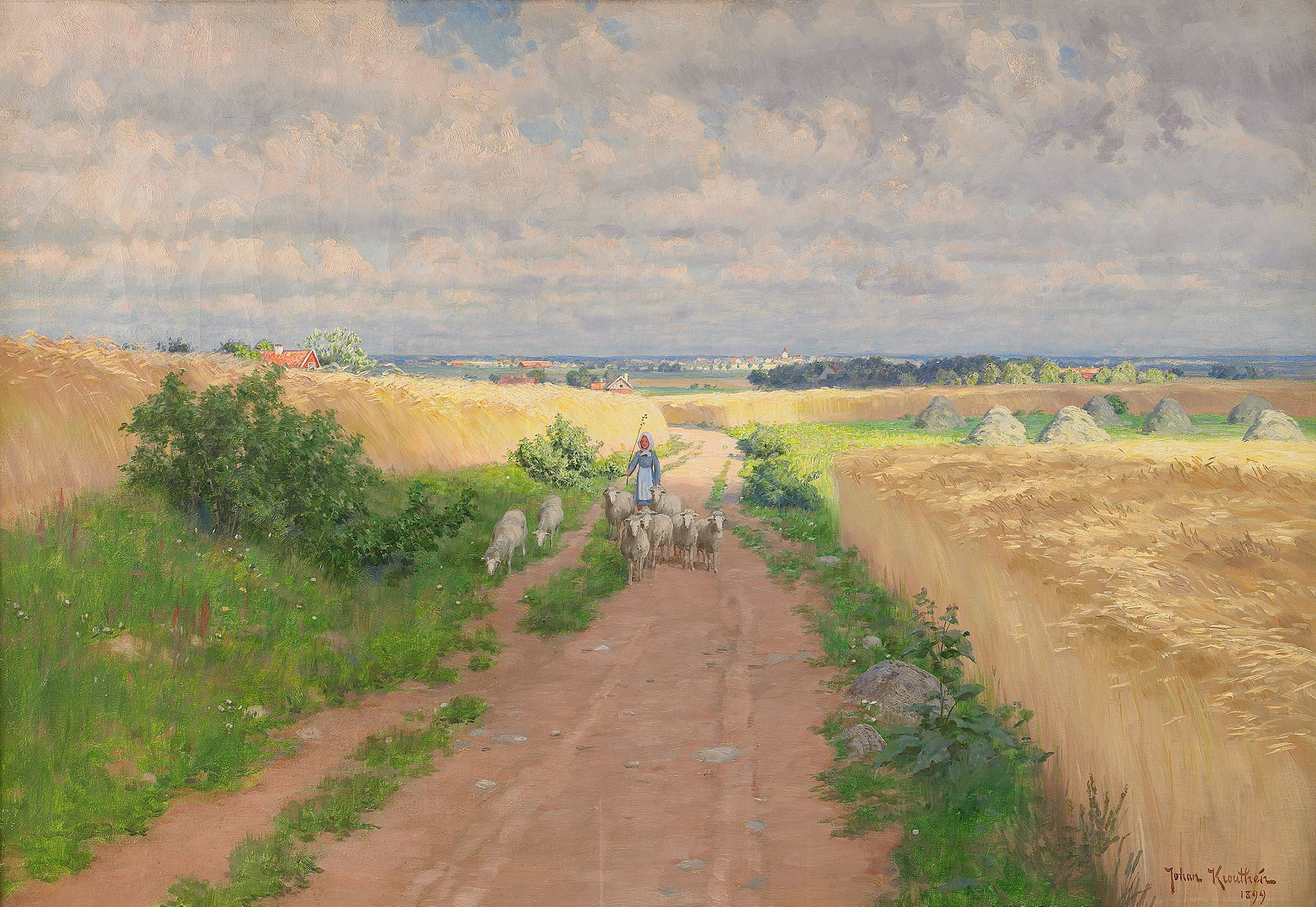
Shepherdess in summer landscape (1889)

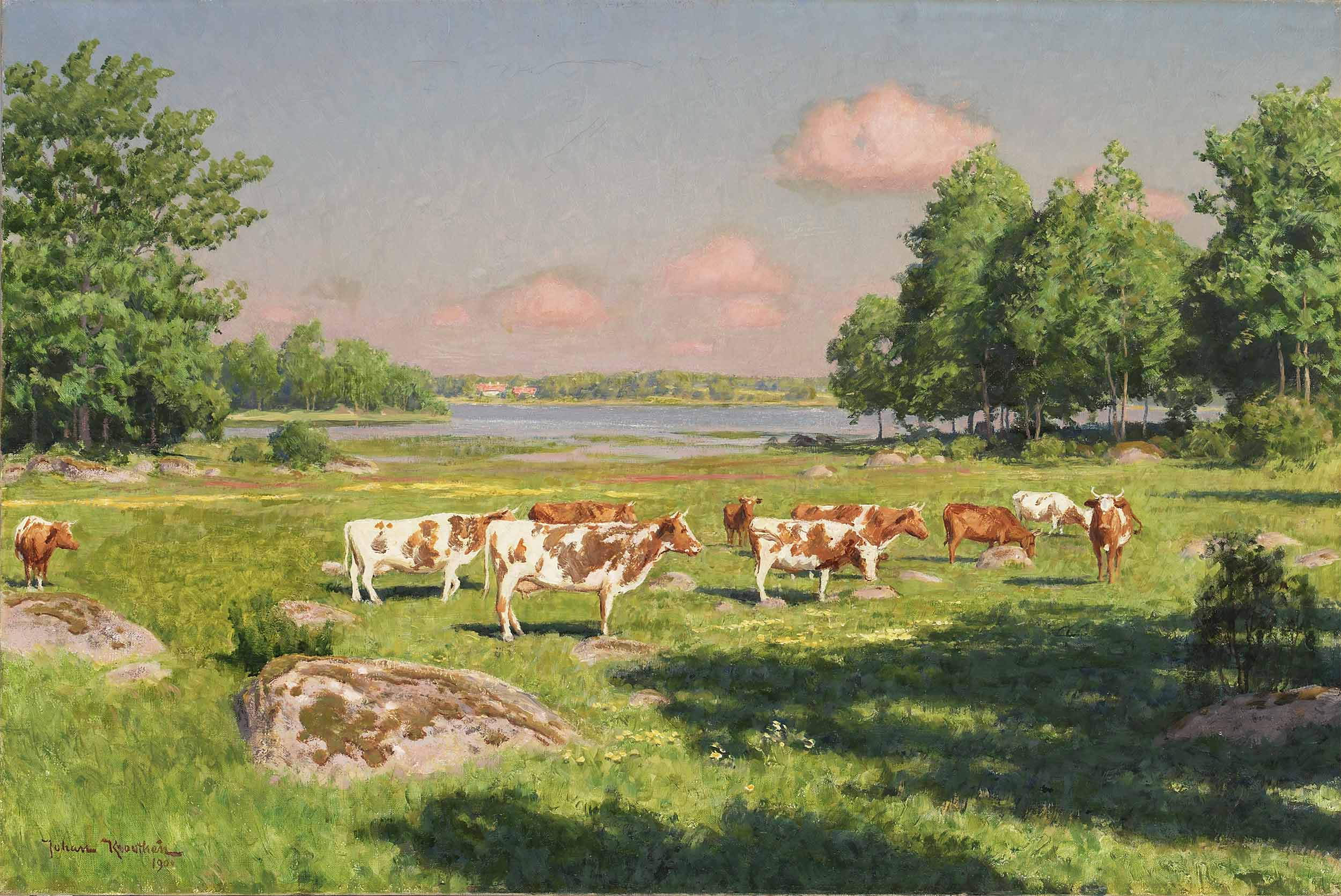
Summer landscape with grazing cattle (1901)

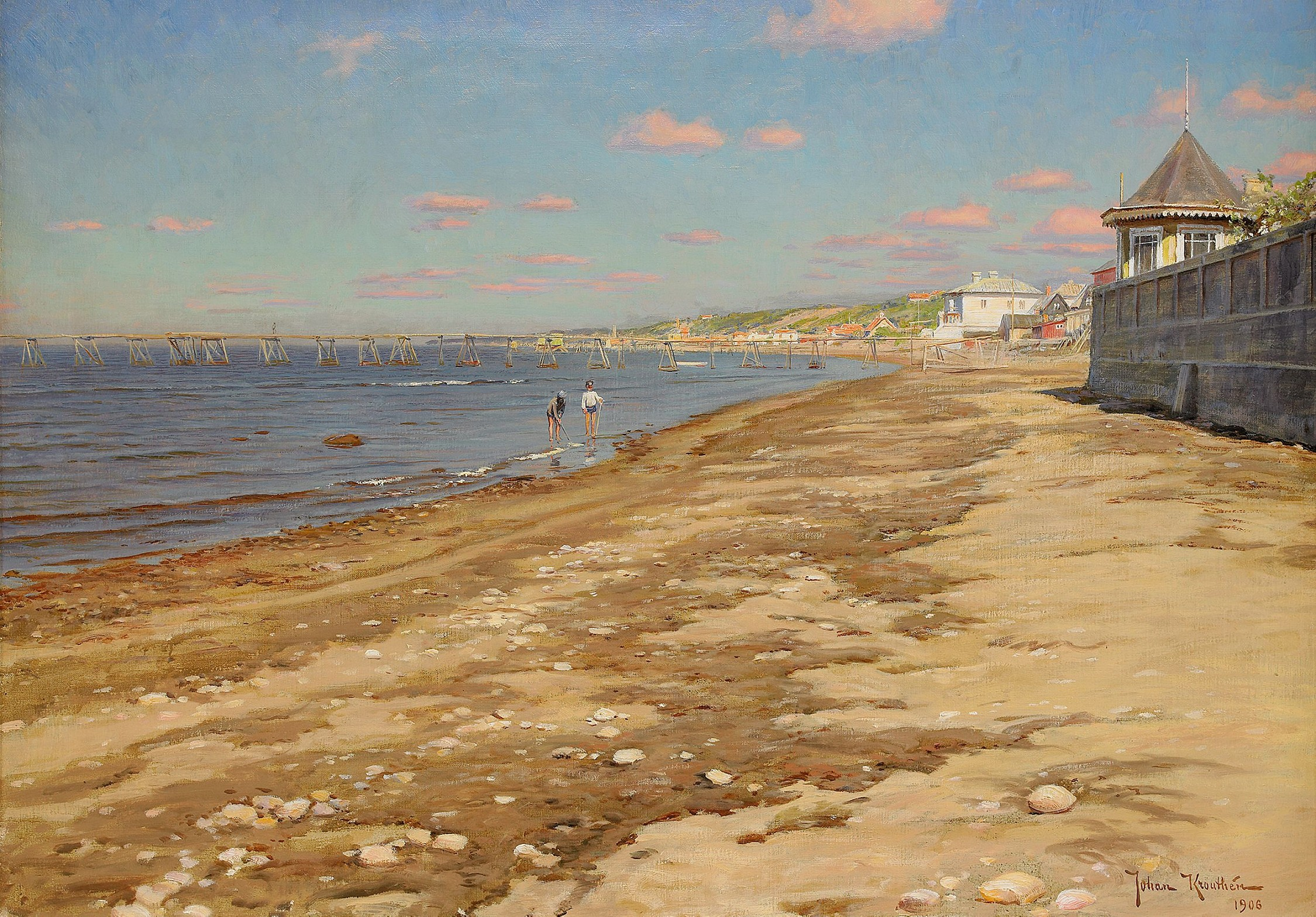
Beach with bathing boys (1906)

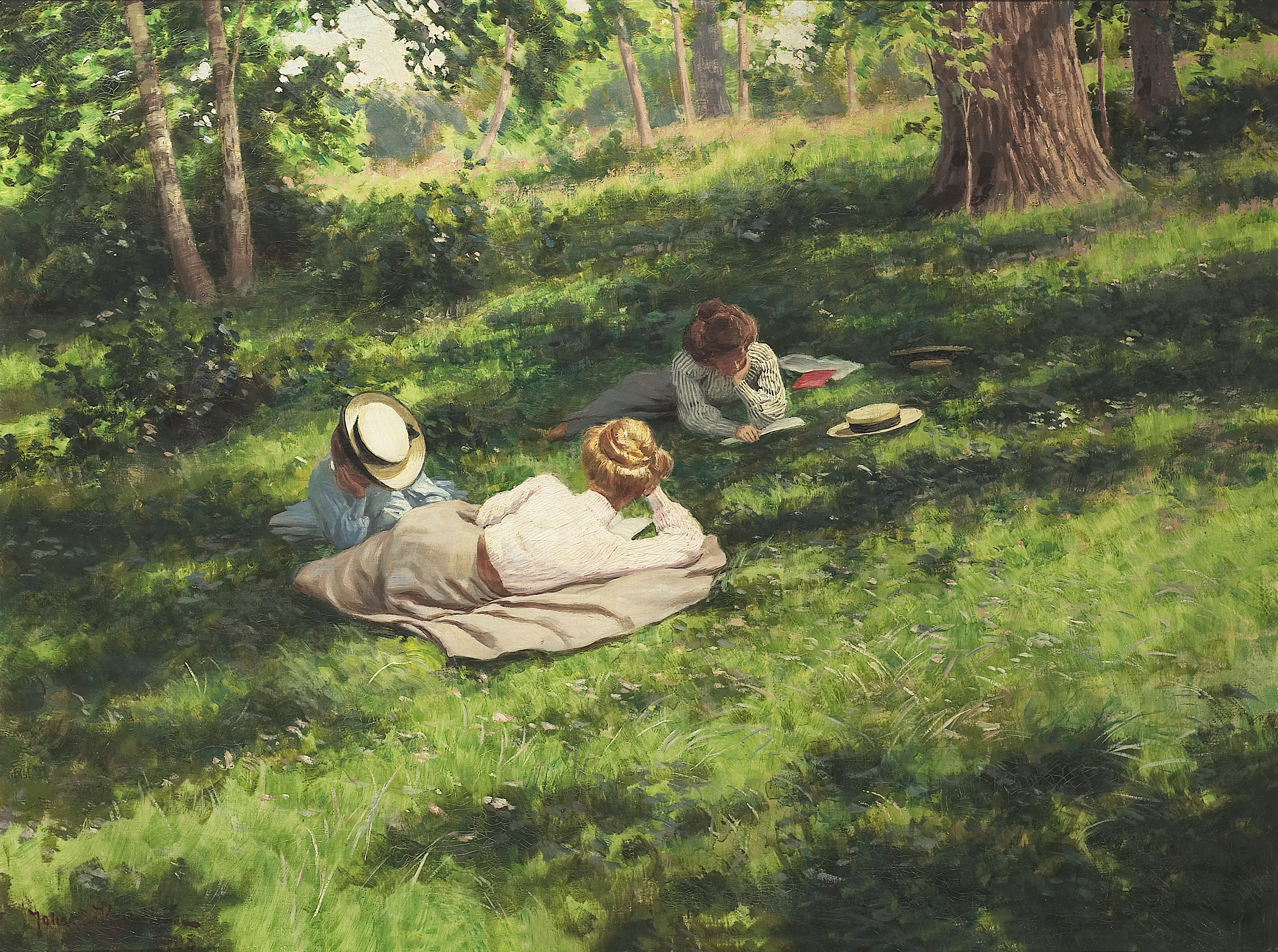
Three women reading in a summer landscape (1908)

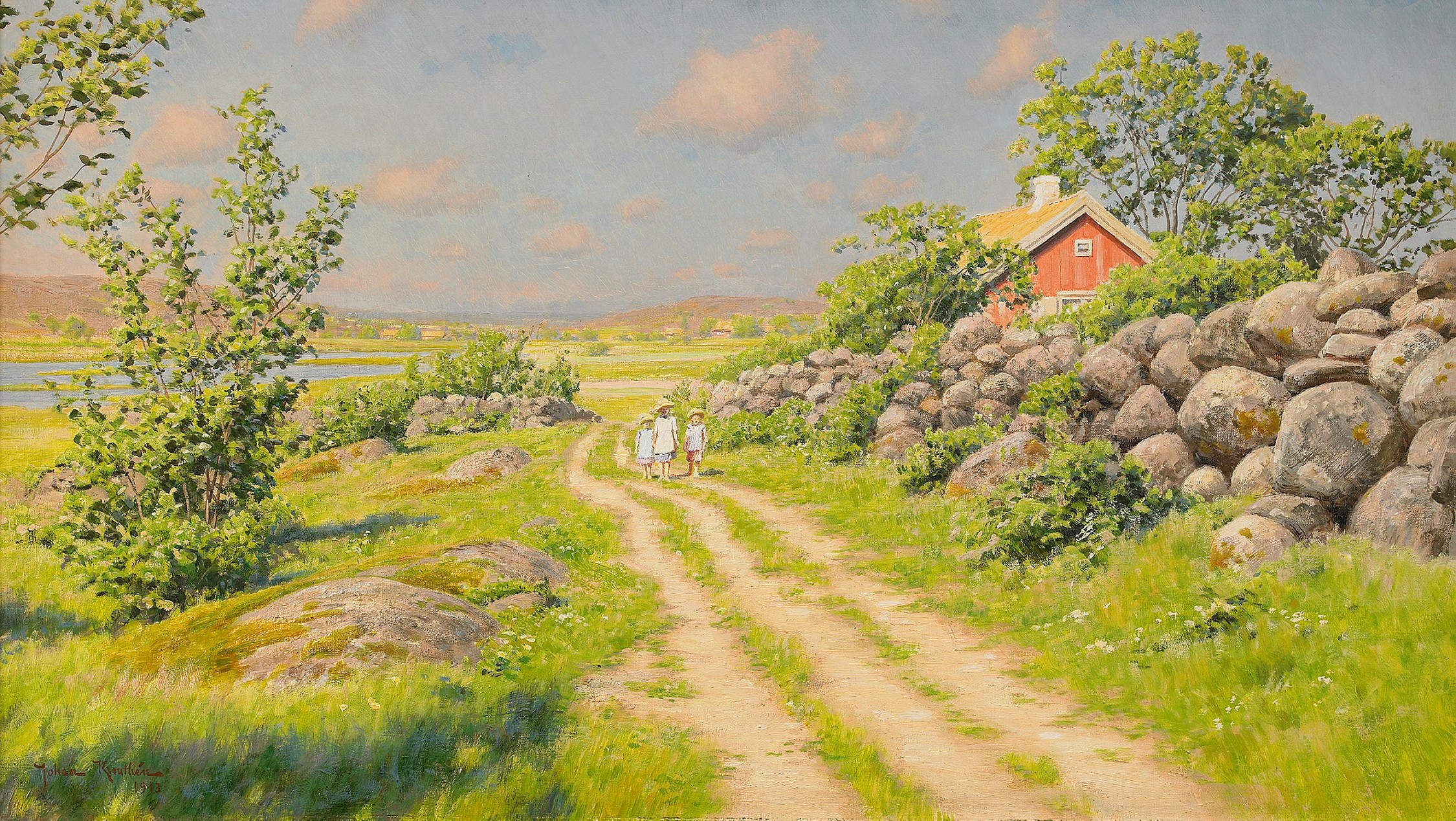
Summer landscape with wandering children (1913)
