= Gustav Undersaker =

Norwegian painter

Gustav Rudolf Undersaker
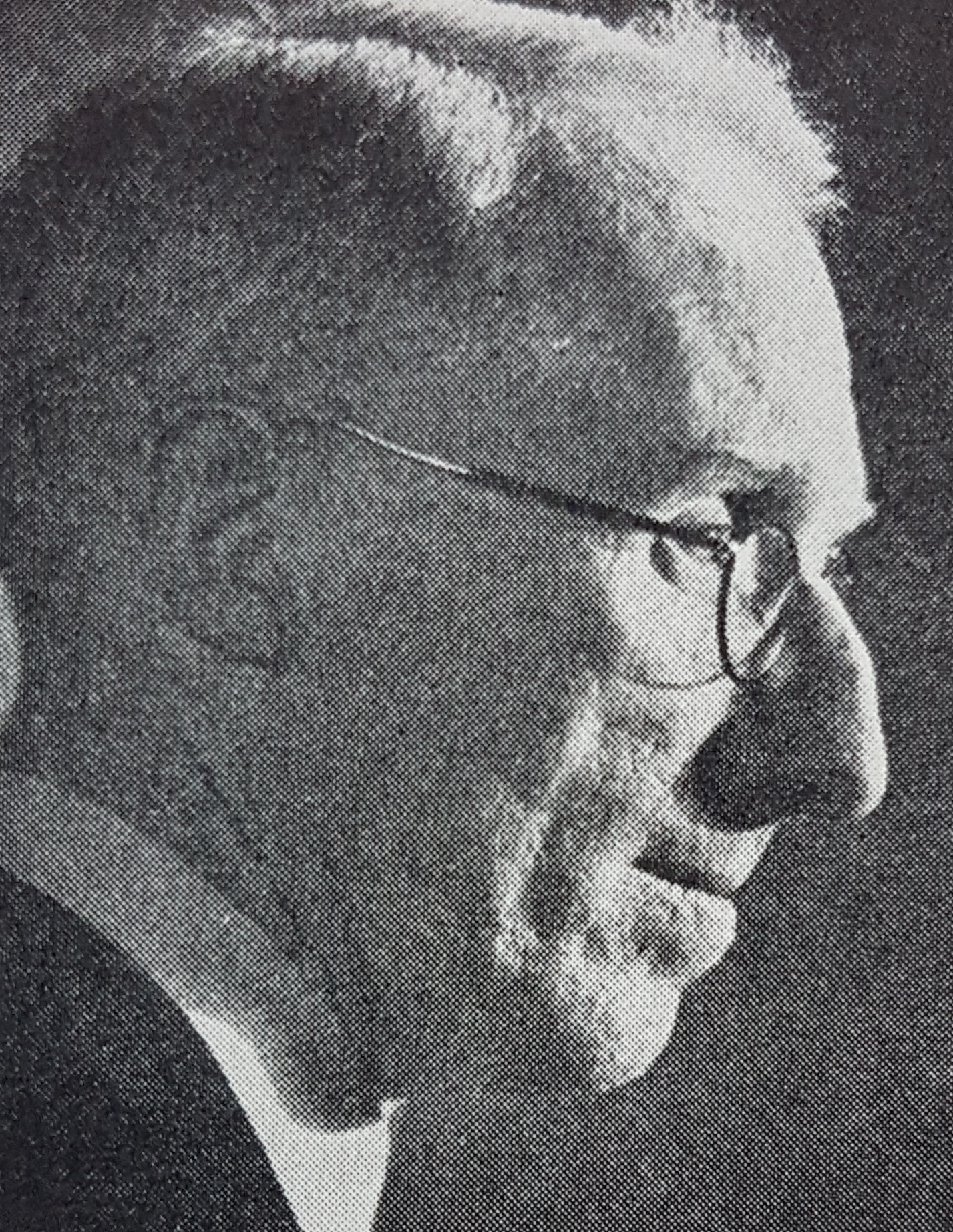
- Born: Gustav Rudolf Johnsen; 6 September 1887; Inderøya, Trøndelag, Norway
- Died: 13 November 1972 (aged 85); Trondheim, Trøndelag, Norway
- Movement: Impressionism

Gustav Rudolf Undersaker (6 September 1887 – 13 November 1972) was a Norwegian painter.

== Biography ==
Gustav Undersaker was born as Gustav Rudolf Johnsen on 6 September 1887, but he took the name "Undersaker" in c. 1914. He had 5 siblings. He studied at the Norwegian National Academy of Craft and Art Industry and at the Norwegian National Academy of Fine Arts between 1910 and 1913. During his stay in Paris in 1914, he saw several works of Paul Cézanne, which became an inspiration for him. After returning from Paris, he was a student of Henrik Sørensen until 1916. He also ran his own painting school in Trondheim for some time, one of his students having been Johs Rian.

Nowadays some of his works can be seen in museums in Norway and Sweden.
