= Nirmal Singh Dhunsi =

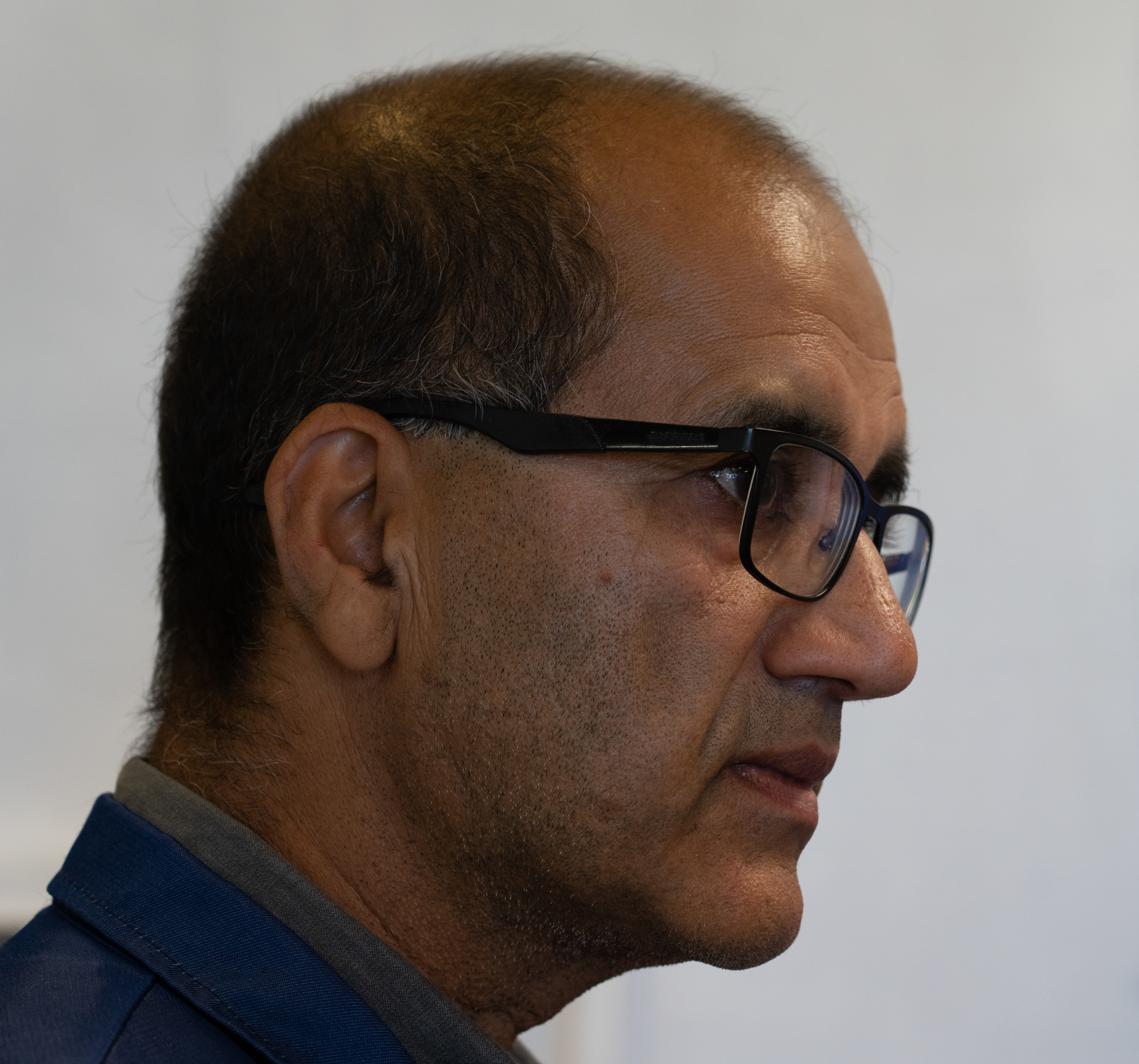
- Nirmal Dhunsi in 2019
- Born: ਨਿਰਮਲ ਸਿੰਘ ਧੌਂਸੀ 1960 (age 65–66); Jandiala Manjki, Jalandhar, India

Nirmal Singh Dhunsi (Punjabi: ਨਿਰਮਲ ਸਿੰਘ ਧੌਂਸੀ, born 1960) is a Punjabi-Norwegian artist. He is known for associating two different cultures, the East (India) and the West (Norway), in his paintings.

== Biography ==
Dhunsi was born in 1960 in village Jandiala Manjki in Jalandhar district of Punjab, India. He migrated to Norway in 1984 and joined the Trondheim Academy of Fine Arts in 1987. He is currently based in Trondheim, Norway.

Since 2008, he has been receiving the minimum guaranteed income for artists from the Government of Norway.

His work is included in the permanent collection of the Nasjonalmuseet, Norway.
