= Øystein Bernhard Mobråten =

Norwegian sculptor

- Born: November 18, 1940 (age 85)
- Occupation: Sculptor

Øystein Bernhard Mobråten (born 18 November 1940) is a Norwegian sculptor, draughtsman and taxidermist.

== Biography ==
Øystein Bernhard Mobråten was born in Lillestrøm, Norway. He spent his childhood on the family farm, Svartås, located in Kongsberg. Following his training in electronics, he secured employment at the Kongsberg weapons factory in 1960. In 1966, he transitioned to a new position as a taxidermist at the Department of Biology within the University of Oslo.

Driven by a personal interest in art, Mobråten undertook independent studies of Greek sculpture at the National Gallery. Here, he encountered art educator Rolf Schønfeld, who offered him private lessons in classical art. Mobråten became both a student and collaborator of Schønfeld, working alongside him from 1966 to 1982.
