= Sigurd Eriksen =

Norwegian painter (1884–1976)

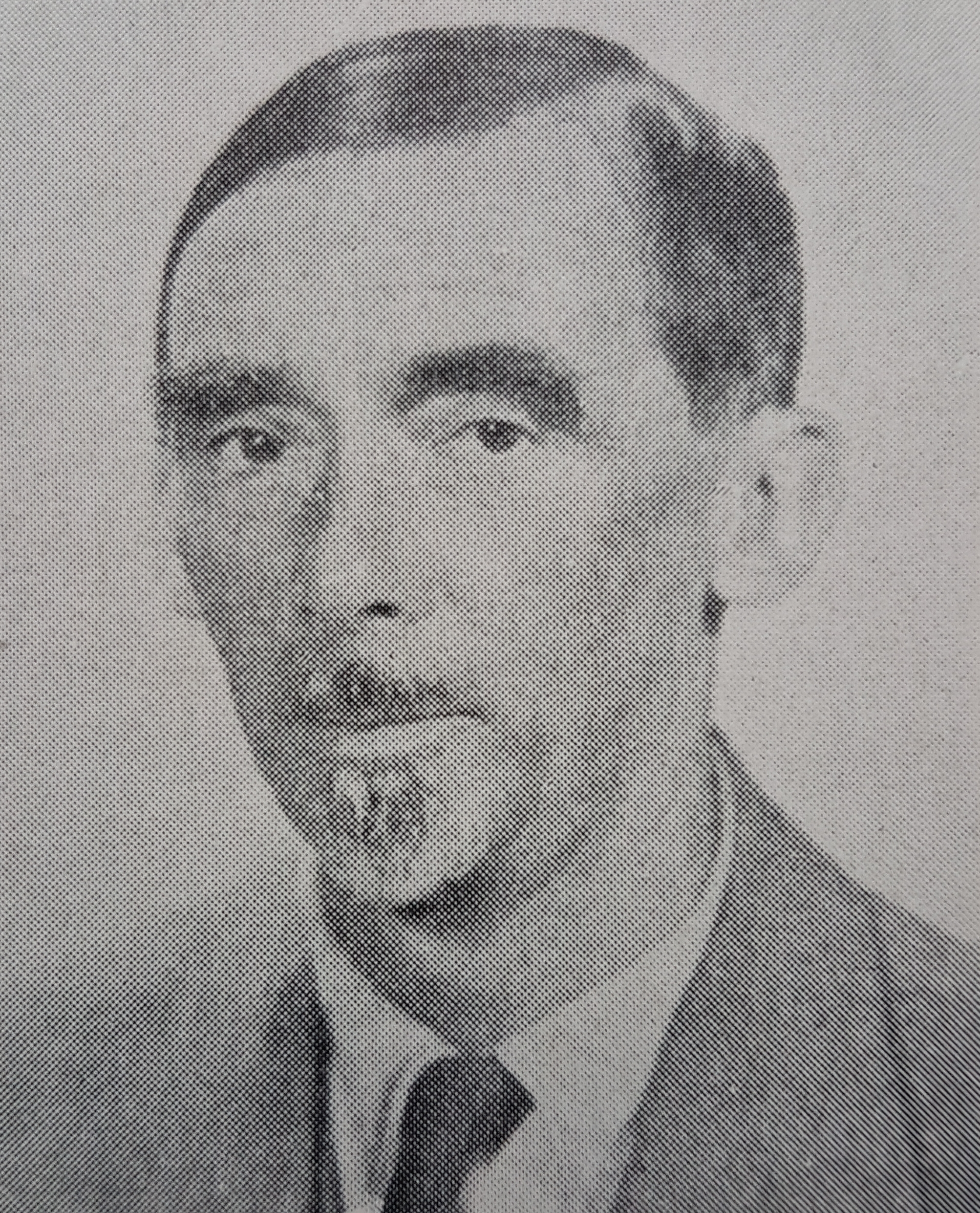
Sigurd Eriksen

Sigurd Eriksen (30 January 1884 – 26 August 1976) was a Norwegian painter.

He was born in Copenhagen, Denmark. He was the son of Adam Emanuel Eriksen and Olea Pedersen. Hios brother Bjarne Eriksen was also a painter. He studied under Kristian Zahrtmann in 1904 and 1905. He attended the Norwegian National Academy of Craft and Art Industry in Oslo. He was awarded both state scholarships and private endowments to study abroad. He conducted study trips to Paris in 1910 and 1919. He is represented with four works in the National Gallery of Norway as well as appearing in public art galleries in Lillehammer, Trondheim and Christianssand.
