= Ludvig Skramstad =

Norwegian painter (1855–1912)

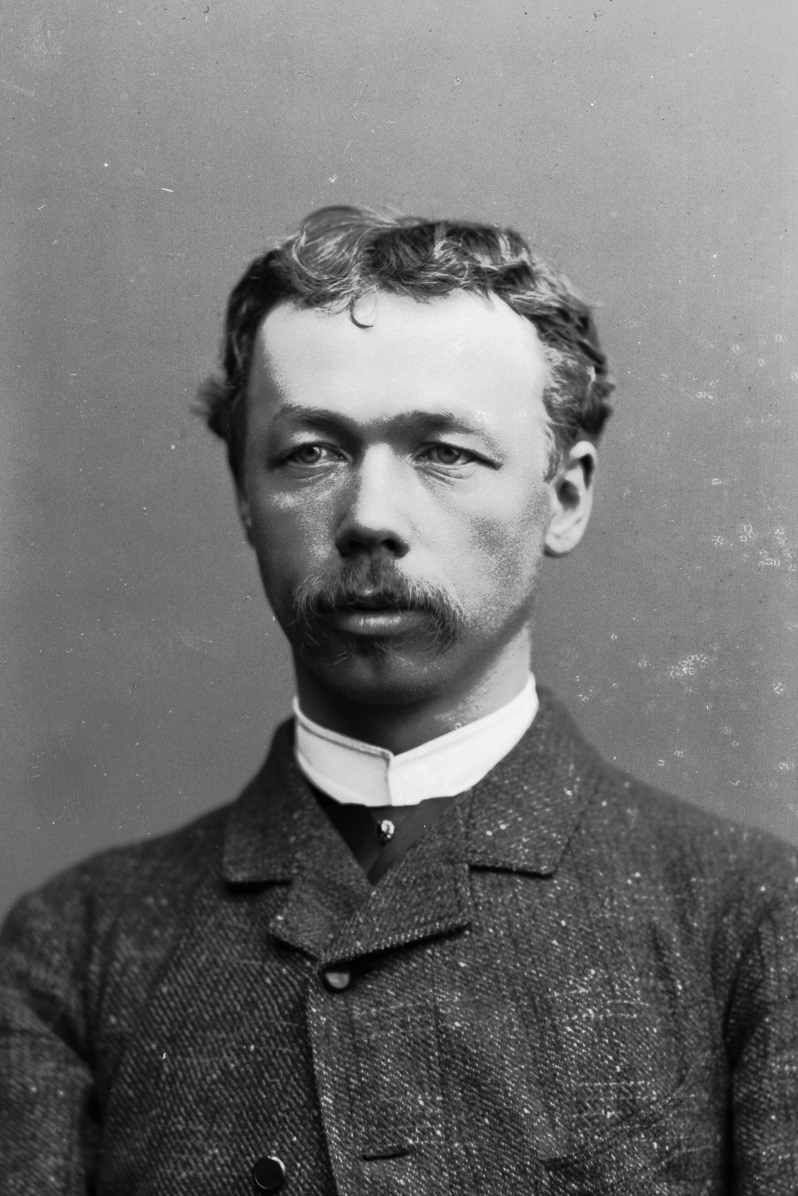
Ludvig Skramstad (date unknown)

Ludvig Skramstad (30 December 1855 – 26 December 1912) was a Norwegian landscape painter. He was associated with the Düsseldorf school of painting.

== Biography ==
Skramstad was born at Hamar in Hedmark, Norway. His father was a painter and glazier. At the age of fifteen, he went to Oslo to attend the Royal Drawing School. From 1871 to 1874, he attended the private art school operated by Knud Bergslien and Morten Müller, who had a great influence on his style. After 1874, he went to Düsseldorf, where he attended the private school of fellow Norwegian artist Sophus Jacobsen.

In 1875, he took a study trip along the Rhine, then returned to Norway. Once there, he travelled to Gudbrandsdalen, Sogn, Hardanger and Hallingdal. His first exhibition was in 1875 at the Oslo Kunstforening. In 1878, a grant from "Schäffers Legat", for painters and sculptors, enabled him to visit London and Paris.

In 1884, he married Aurora Guidotti (1855-1888), the daughter of an immigrant Italian pewter maker. She died four years later and he married her sister, Vincentia Sofie Emma Guidotti (1852-1944) who outlived him by thirty-two years. Thanks to a government travel scholarship, he was able to spend the years 1885–86 in Munich.

When he returned, he built a house in Drøbak. Around 1900, due to financial woes, he began getting up early every morning to paint several pictures that he sold at bargain prices. He stayed there until 1902 then, possibly because of continued negative criticism (notably from Jens Thiis, who wrote that Skramstad had "wasted his talents" on repetitive paintings) he left his family and went back to Munich to work for a German art dealer. He died in Munich ten years later.

There is a display of his work at the National Museum of Art, Architecture and Design (Nasjonalmuseet) which includes Utsikt over dalføre and Vinterlandskap.

== Selected paintings ==
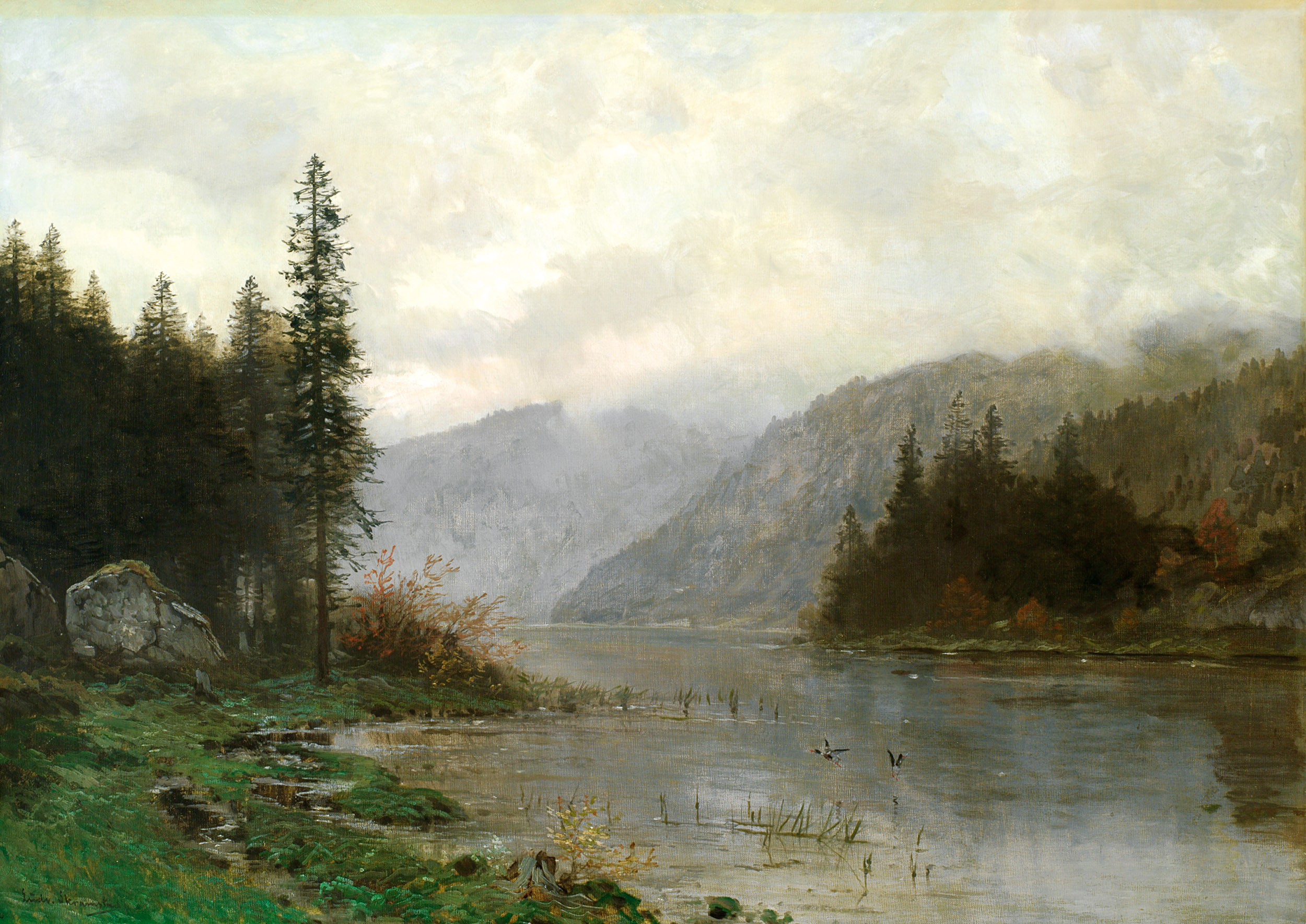
Forest Lake with Ducks

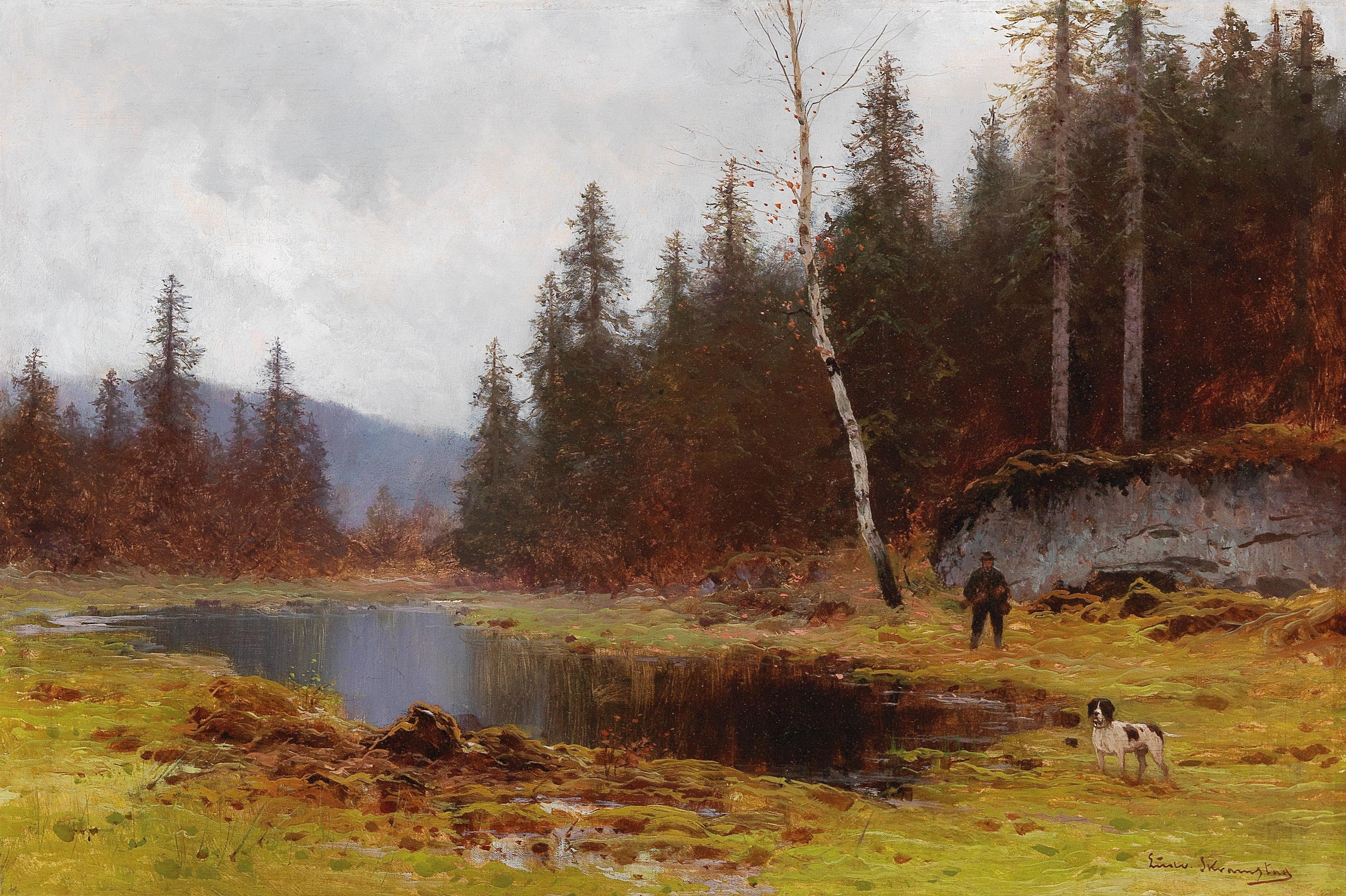
Hunter by a Pond

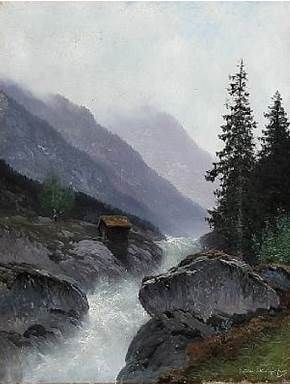
River

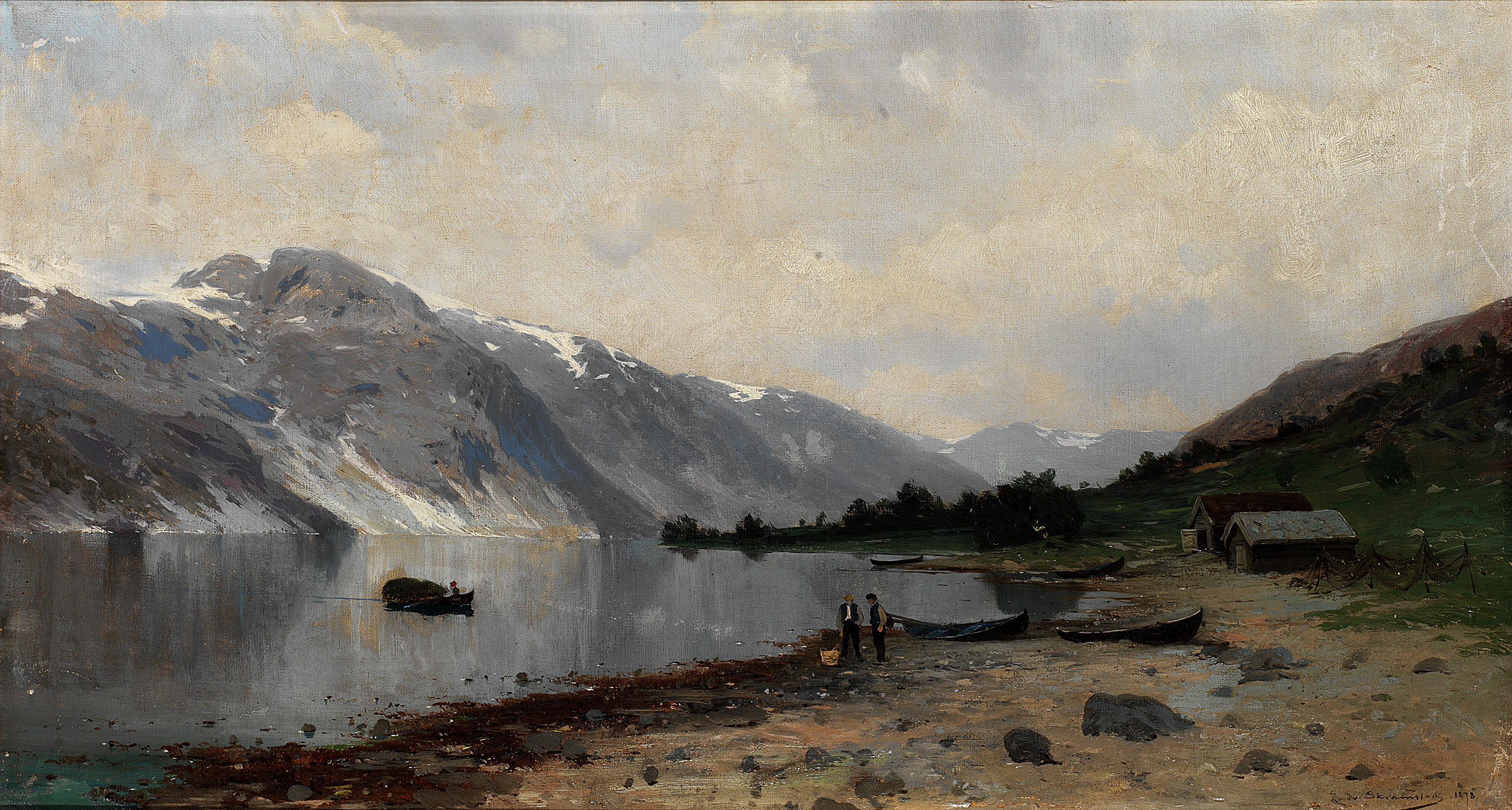
Hoy in the Fjord

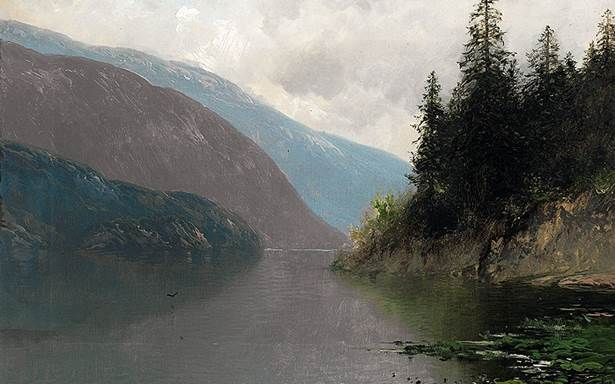
Fjord
