= Gregers Lundh =

Norwegian military officer and academic

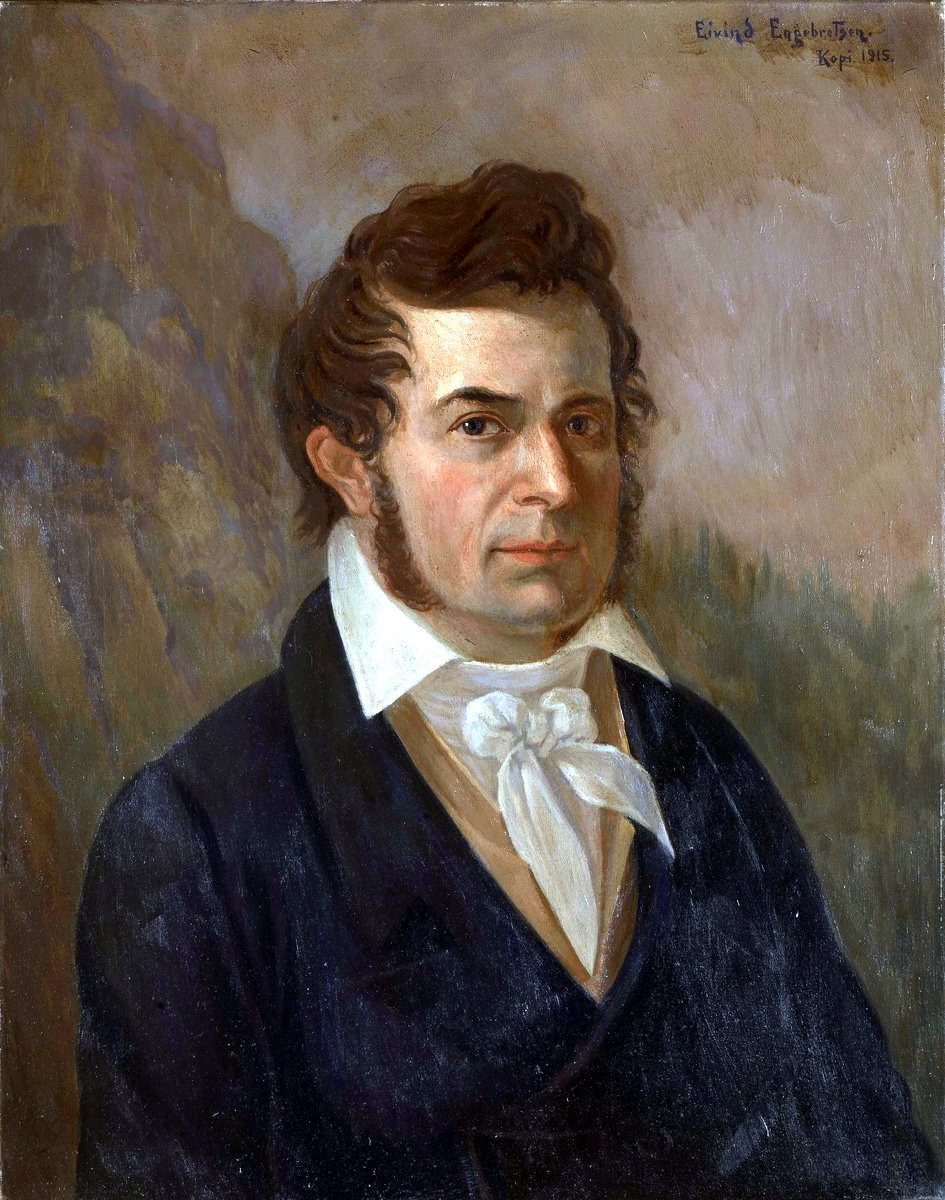
Gregers painted by Johannes Flintoe (1787–1870)

Gregers Fougner Lundh (15 May 1786 – 11 July 1836) was a Norwegian military officer and academic.
