= Håkon Gullvåg =

Norwegian painter (born 1959)

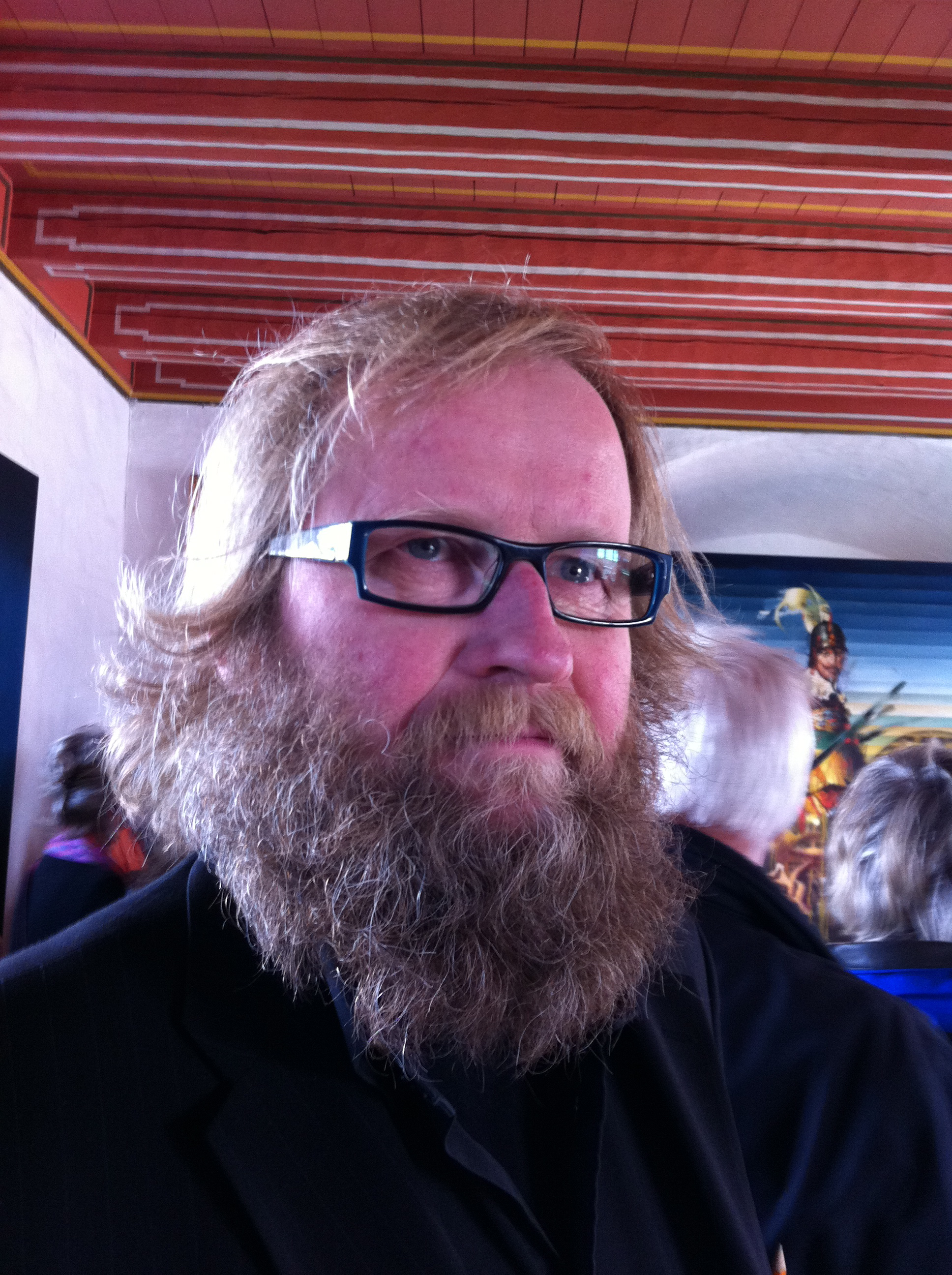
Håkon Gullvåg

Håkon Gullvåg (born 20 February 1959) is a Norwegian painter.
