= Bjarne Eriksen (painter) =

Norwegian painter (1882–1970)

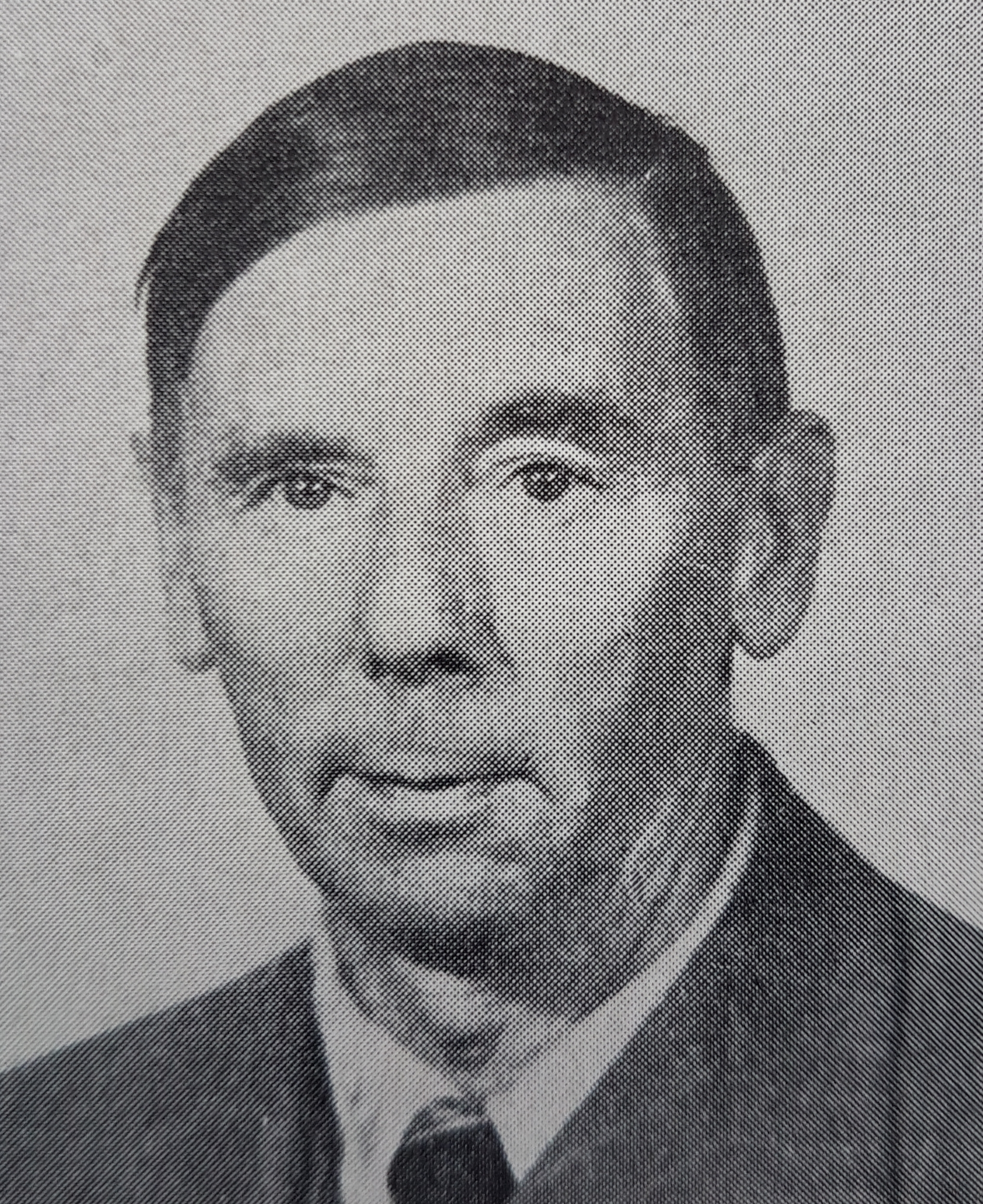
Bjarne Eriksen

Bjarne Eriksen (30 March 1882 – 21 November 1970) was a Norwegian painter.

He was born in Copenhagen, Denmark. He was the son of Adam Emanuel Erichsen and Olea Pedersen. His brother Sigurd Eriksen was also a painter. He attended the Norwegian National Academy of Craft and Art Industry in Oslo. He studied art under Kristian Zahrtmann in 1904 and 1905 and was also influenced by Henrik Sørensen. He was awarded both state scholarships and private endowments to study abroad. He conducted study trips to Paris in 1910 and 1919. He principally painted abstract and colorful landscapes. He is represented in the National Gallery of Norway.
