= Nils Hansteen =

Norwegian painter (1855–1912)

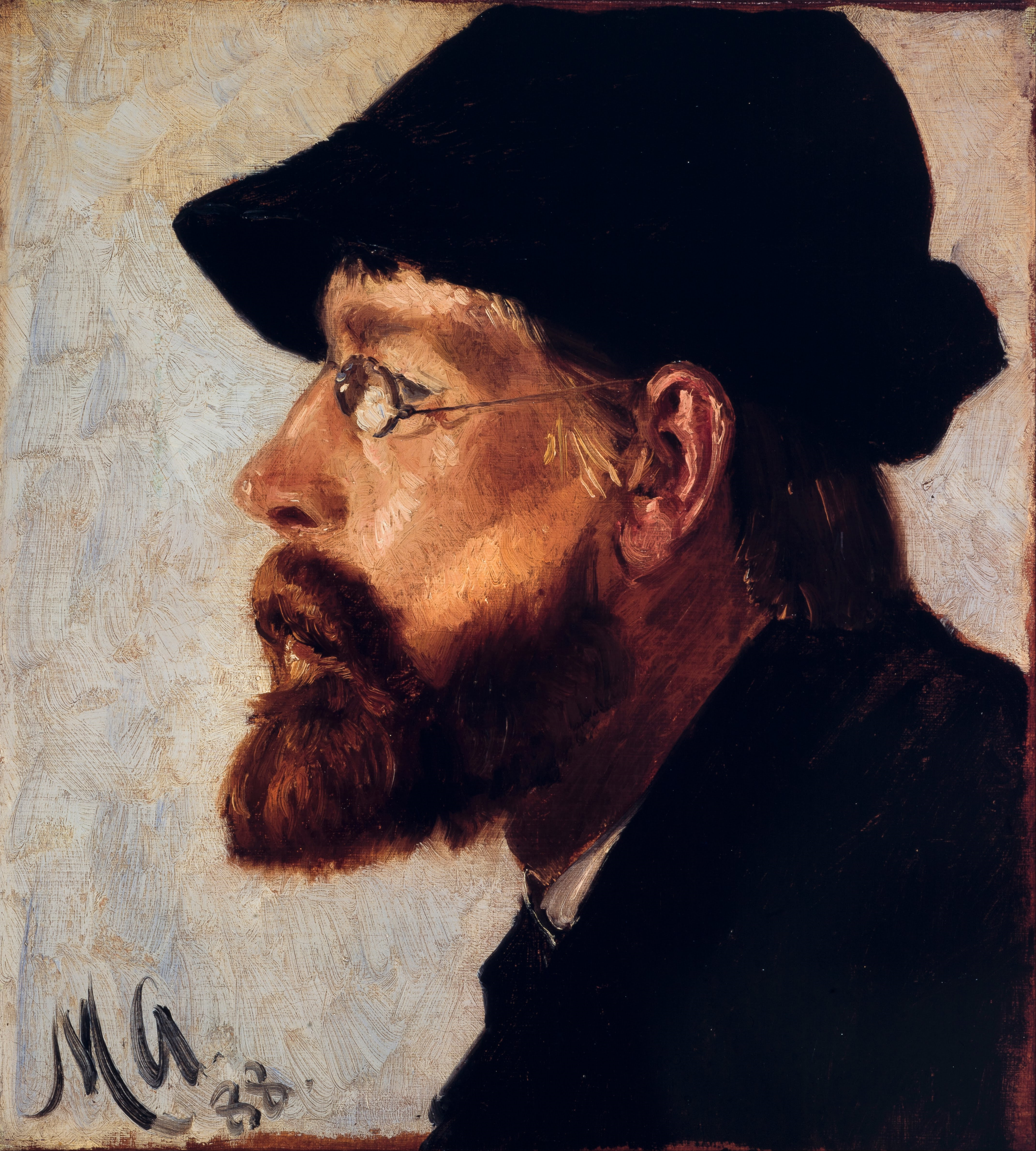
Nils Hansteen. Portrait painted by Michael Ancher, 1888. From the portrait frieze at Skagens Museum.

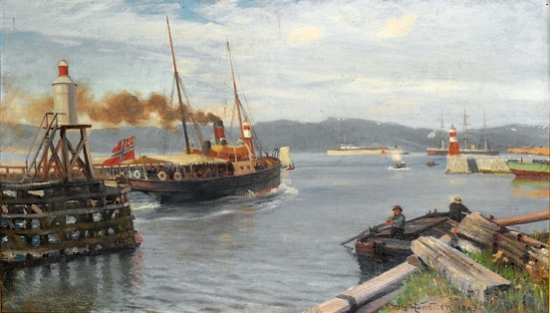
Fjordabåt stevner ut Trondheim havn (1893)

Nils Severin Lynge Hansteen (27 April 1855 – 11 October 1912) was a Norwegian painter. He was known principally for his landscape painting as well as his marine art, often featuring ships in a stormy sea.

== Life and work ==
Nils Hansteen painted in a naturalistic style, with motifs from marine and forest environments. His art is on exhibit at a number of public art museum throughout Norway including Trondheim Kunstmuseum, as well as the Kunstforening in Drammen and the Kunstmuseene in Bergen. Two of his paintings, including Snøtykke (1890), are owned by the National Gallery of Norway.

Nils Hansteen was born in Mo i Rana, in the county of Nordland, Norway. He first attended a technical college in Trondheim to study mechanical engineering. He subsequently attended the Bergslien School of Art where he studied under Knud Bergslien and Morten Müller during 1873 and with Peder Cappelen Thurmann at the Royal Drawing and Art School. He later studied under Hans Gude in Karlsruhe (1876 to 1877) where Gude led him into marine painting and greatly influenced his artistic development. He later lived in Munich (1877–1880) and Italy (1880–1881). In 1881, he came back to Norway, and was resident in Christiania (now Oslo) until his death, except the period 1887 to 1892 when he stayed in Copenhagen. Was a member for Norway of the exposition committee at Nordic Exhibition of 1888.
