= Knud Bergslien =

Norwegian painter

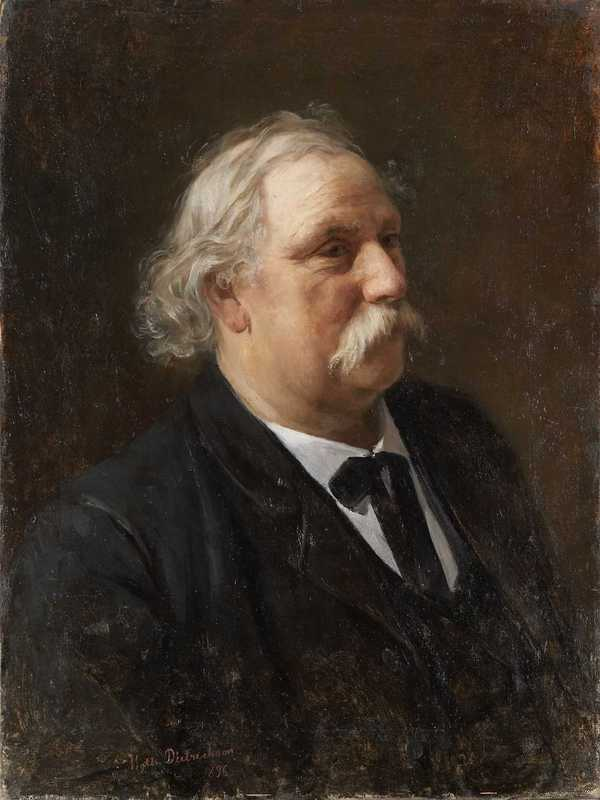
Portrait of Knud Bergslien by Johanne Mathilde Dietrichson, 1854

Knud Larsen Bergslien (15 May 1827 – 27 November 1908) was a Norwegian painter, art teacher and master artist. In his art, he frequently portrayed the lives of the Norwegian people, their history and heroes of the past. Bergslien is most associated with his historical paintings, especially Skiing Birchlegs Crossing the Mountain with the Royal Child.

== Background ==
Knud Larsen Bergslien was born in Voss in Søndre Bergenhus county, Norway. His parents were Lars Bergeson Bergslien and Kirsten Knutsdotter Gjelle. Knud Bergslien was the brother of sculptor Brynjulf Bergslien and uncle of painter and sculptor Nils Bergslien. Monuments honoring the three famous Bergslien artists now exist in Bergslien park located in Voss Municipality in Vestland county.

== Career ==
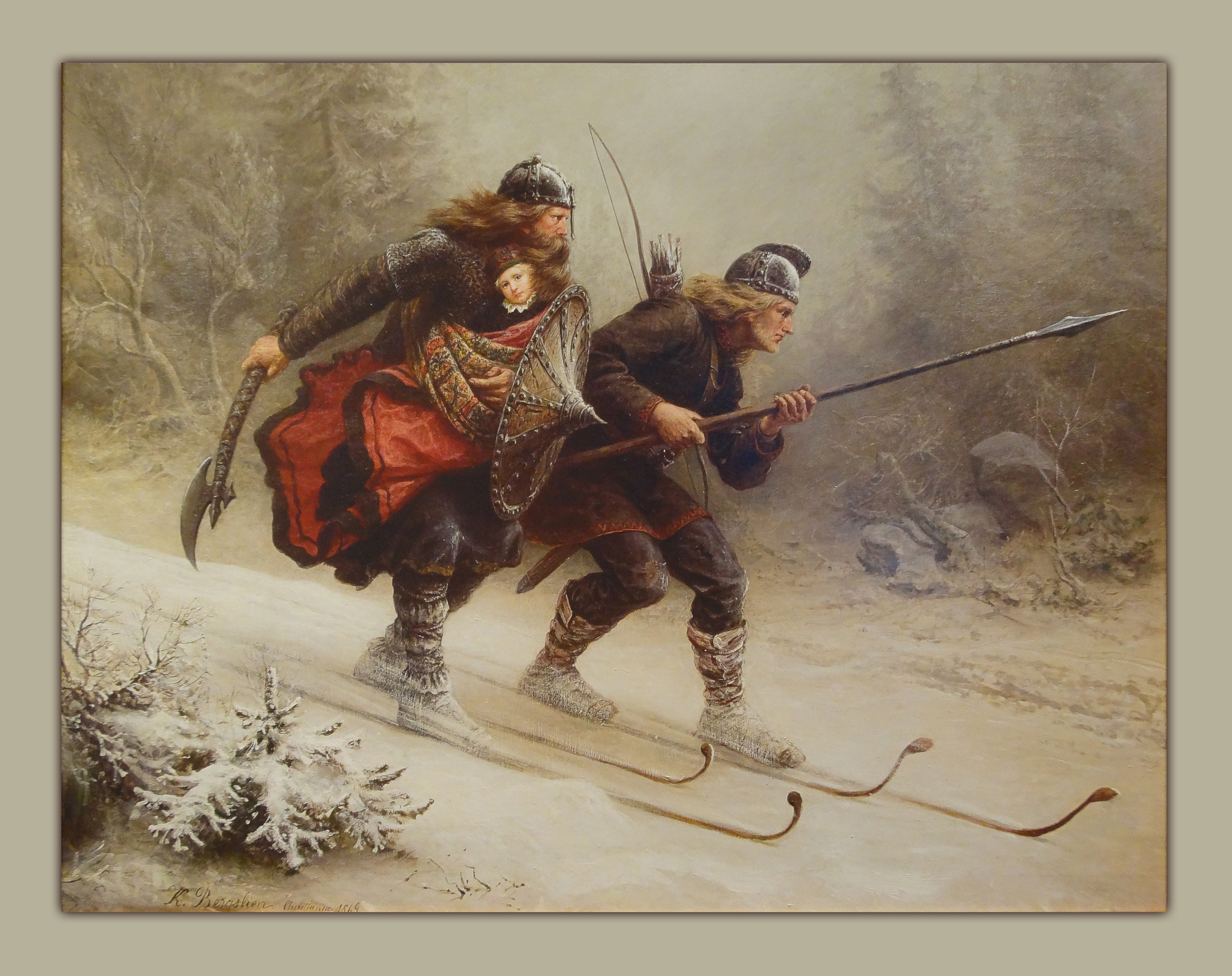
Skiing Birchlegs Crossing the Mountain with the Royal Child. Painting located at the Holmenkollen Ski Museum, Oslo, Norway.

Knud Bergslien enlisted in the army when he was 18 years old, but his unusual gift for drawing was soon noticed. After having been a student at the artist Hans Reusch's school of drawing in Bergen, he continued his studies abroad. Bergslien studied in Antwerp from 1844 to 1852, in Paris from 1850 to 1851 and Düsseldorf from 1855 to 1869. He belonged to the Düsseldorf school of painting and was closely associated with follow artists Hans Fredrik Gude and Adolph Tidemand.

Norwegian artist Johan Fredrik Eckersberg had established an art school on Lille Grensen in Christiania (now Oslo) in 1859. After his death in 1870, the school would be continued by Knud Bergslien together with Morten Müller. Knud Bergslien served as the director of what became the Bergslien School of Painting (Bergsliens Malerskole). A whole generation of Norwegian painters became his students, among them Harriet Backer, Edvard Munch, and Ragnvald Hjerlow. Some of his students emigrated to America including the Norwegian-American artists, Lars Jonson Haukaness, Carl L. Boeckmann and Herbjørn Gausta.

Today, Bergslien is most associated with his historical paintings, especially Skiing Birchlegs Crossing the Mountain with the Royal Child (Norwegian: Birkebeinerne på Ski over Fjeldet med Kongsbarnet). His depiction of Birkebeiner skiers carrying Prince Haakon to safety during the winter of 1206 has become a national Norwegian icon. The prince grew up to be King Haakon IV whose reign marked the end of the period known as the Civil war era in Norway.

Bergslien was honored by the Oscar II, King of Sweden and Norway with the Order of Vasa, an esteemed order of Knighthood, for his 1875 painting titled The Crowning of King Oscar II in the Nidaros Cathedral (Norwegian: Kong Oscar II's kroning i Nidarosdomen). Bergslien’s work is represented the National Gallery of Norway.

== Bergslien Art School students ==
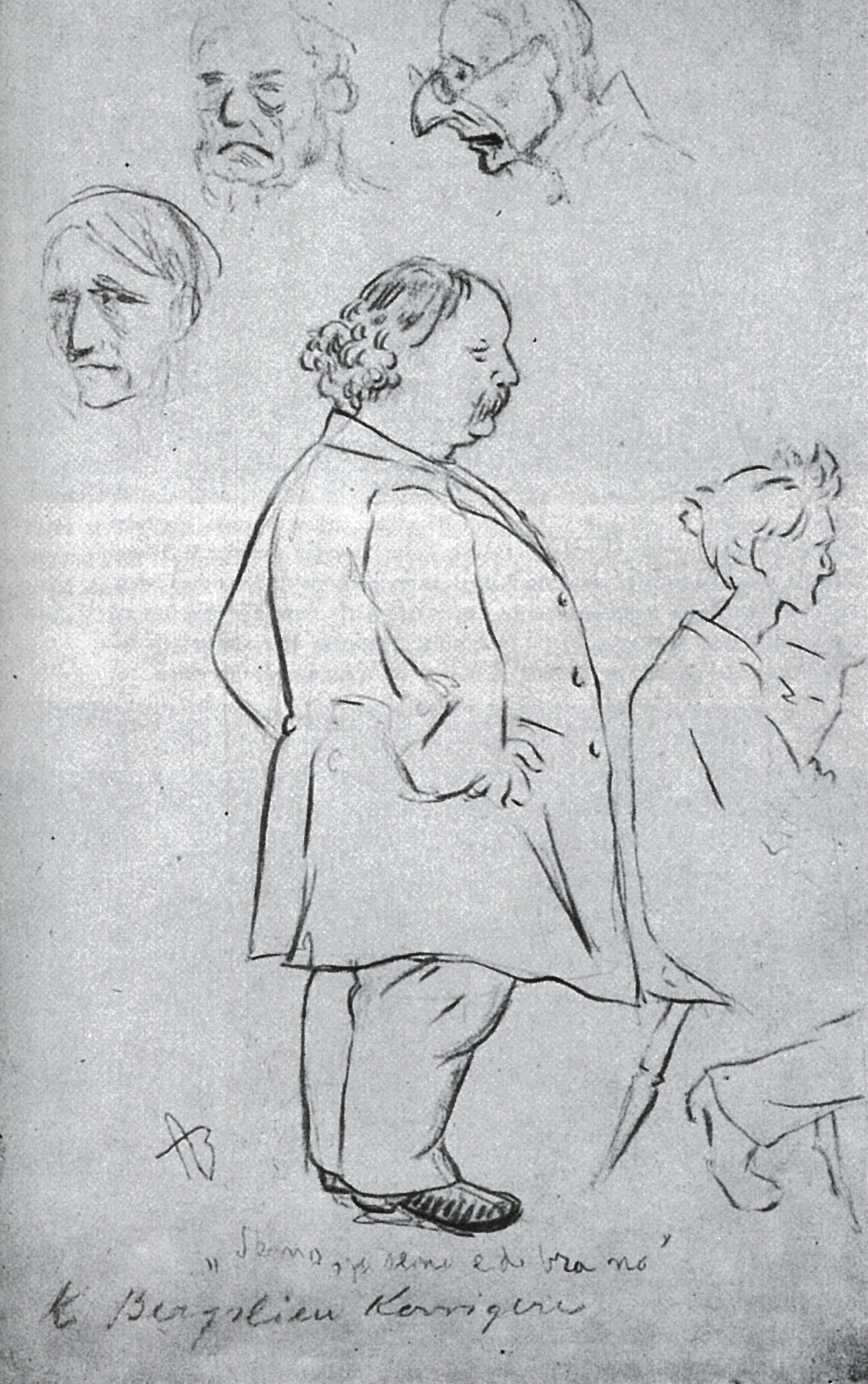
Bergslien at his art academy. Drawn by Andreas Bloch

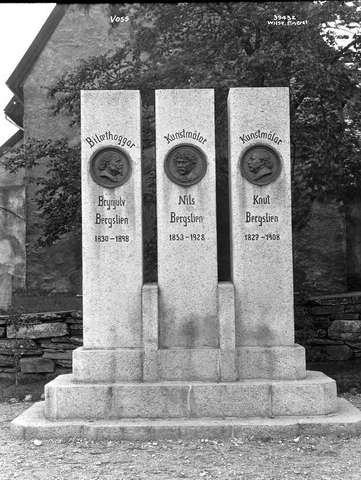
Monument in Voss to Knud Bergslien, his brother Brynjulf and his nephew Nils

- Harriet Backer
- Andreas Bloch
- Carl L. Boeckmann
- Cecilie Dahl
- Hans Dahl
- Halfdan Egedius
- Herbjørn Gausta
- Andrea Gram
- Nils Hansteen
- Lars Jonson Haukaness
- Ragnvald Hjerlow
- Kristen Holbø
- Fanny Ingvoldstad
- Morten Müller
- Gerhard Munthe
- Lars Osa
- Eyolf Soot
- Gustav Wentzel

== Gallery ==
=== Portraits ===
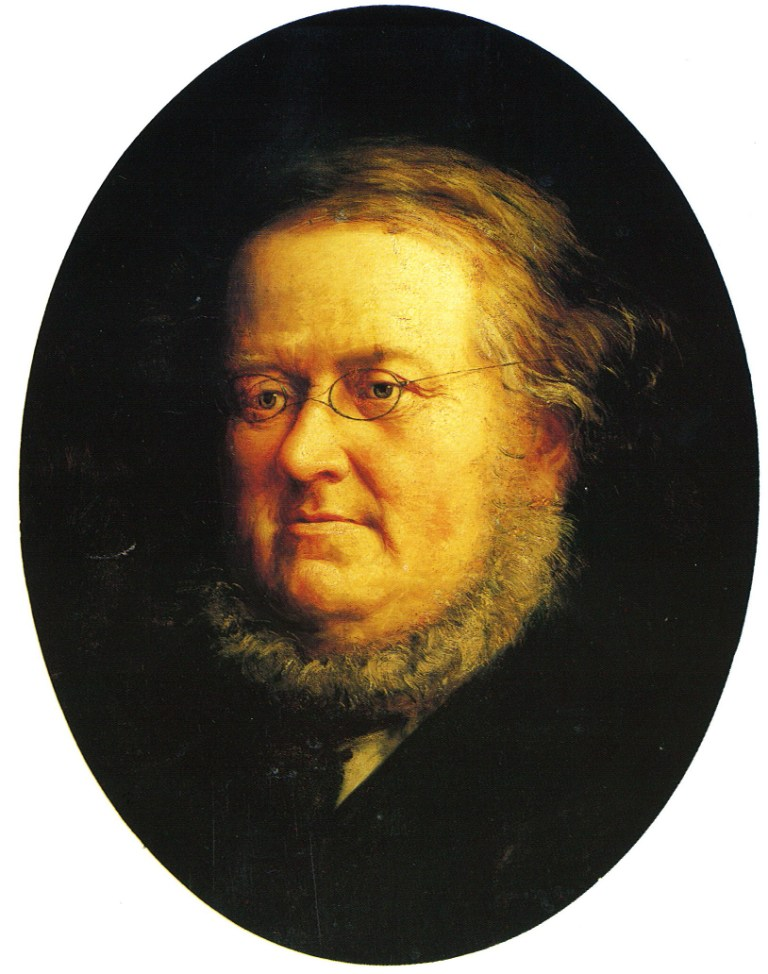
Portrait of Peter Christen Asbjørnsen. (1870)

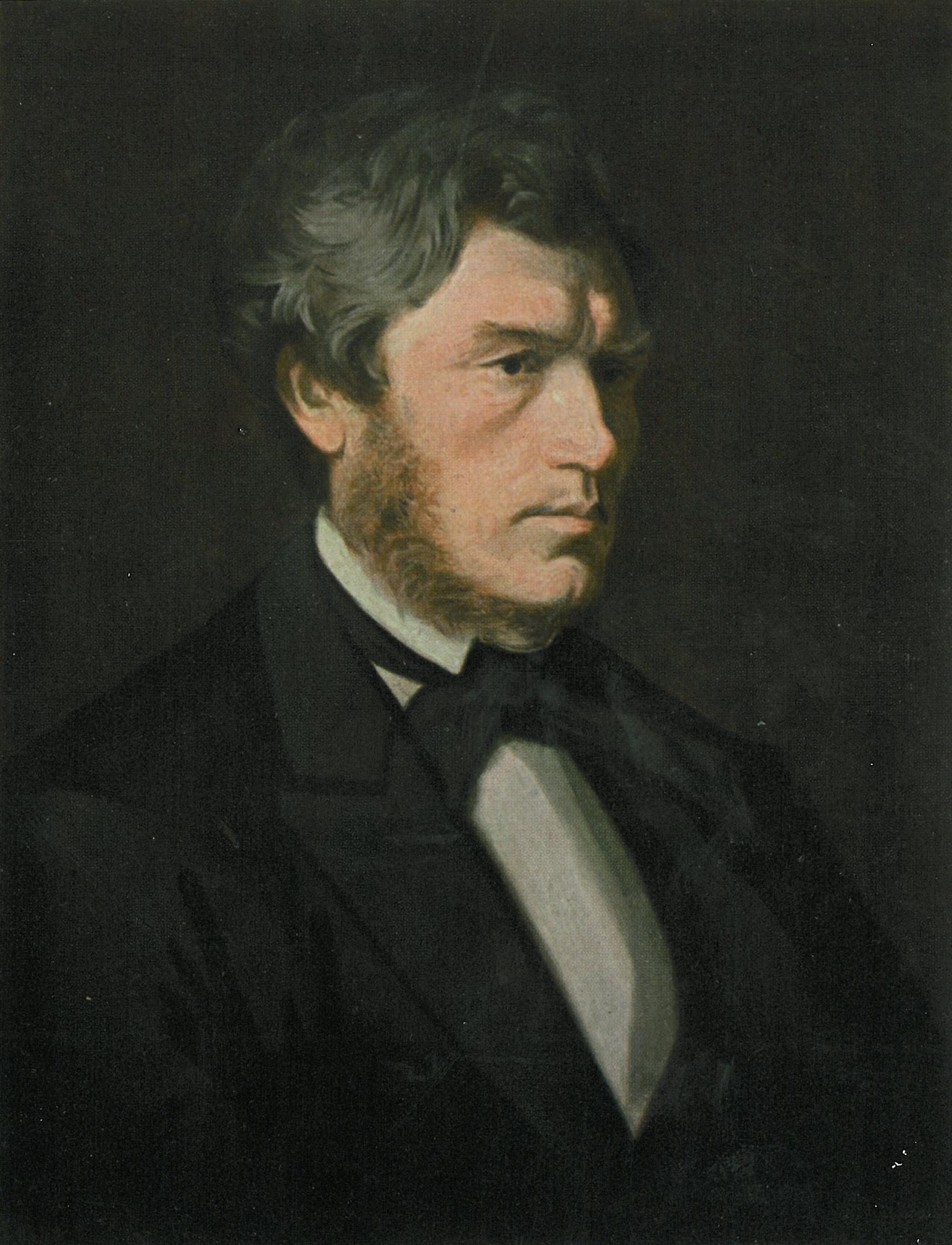
Portrait of Carl Fredrik Diriks. (1872)

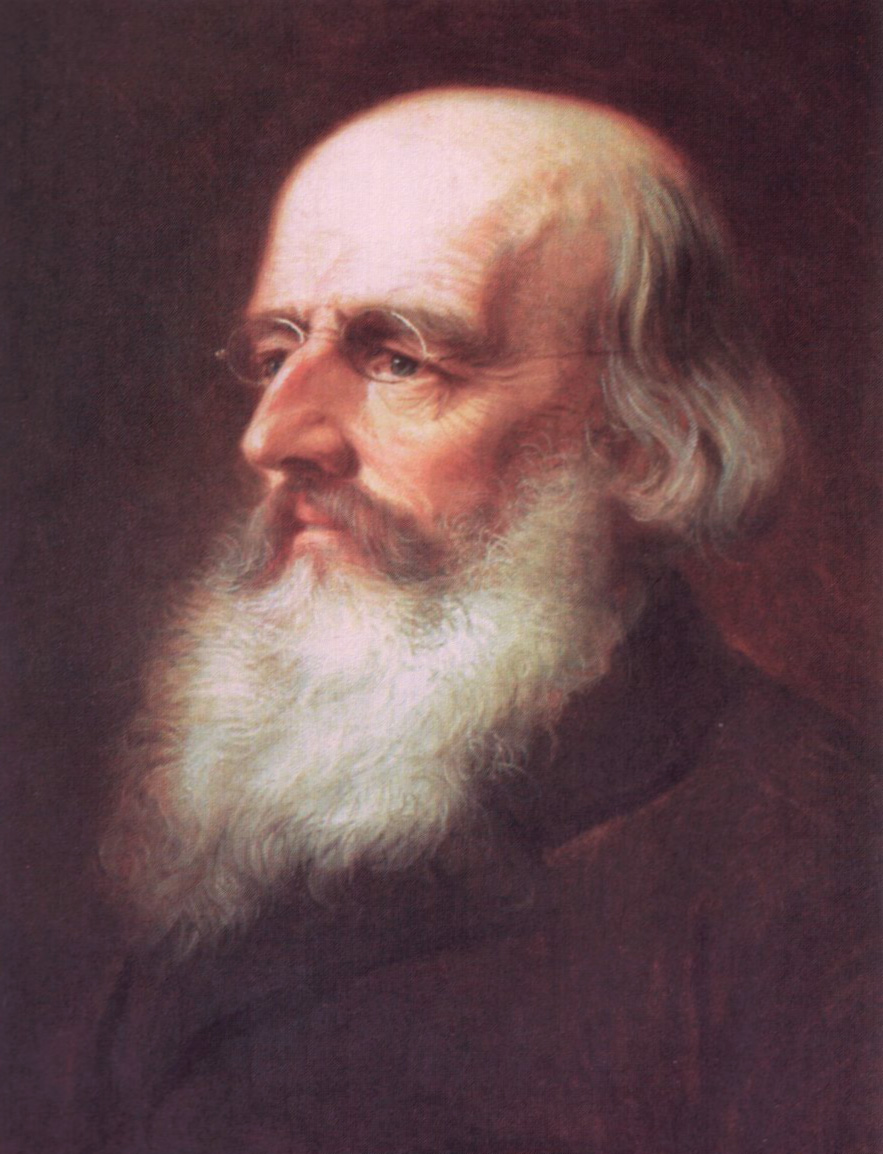
Portrait of Konrad von Maurer. (1876)

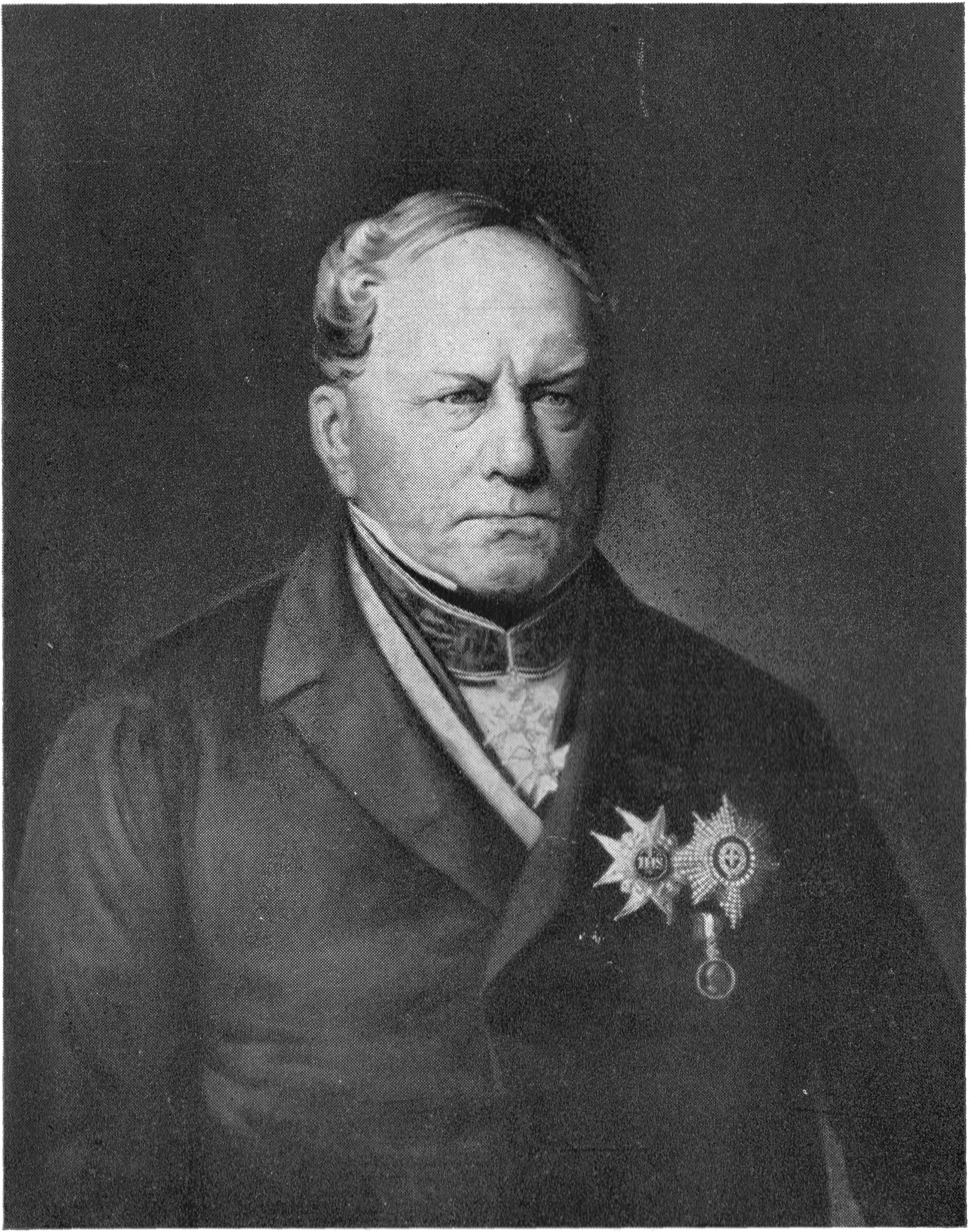
Portrait of Severin Løvenskiold. (1854)

=== Landscapes ===
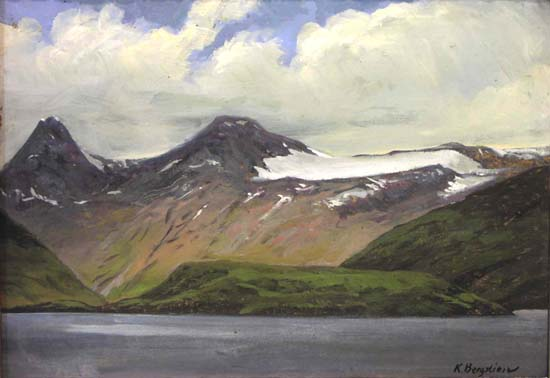
Fjordbunn

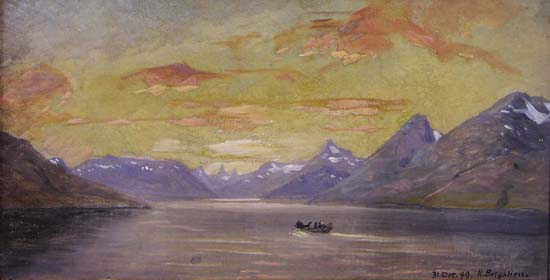
Nordnorsk fjordidyll

== Other sources ==
- Dagestad, Magnus Dei tre Bergsli-kunstnarane (Classica Antikvariat.1945. Voss)
