= Carl L. Boeckmann =

Norwegian-American painter

Carl Ludwig Boeckmann (January 29, 1867 – September 21, 1923) was a Norwegian-American artist best known as a portrait painter.

== Biography ==
Boeckmann was born in Christiania, Norway, the youngest of five children. In 1883, he began to study at Knud Bergslien's school of painting. A year later Christian Krogh, Erik Werenskiold, Eilif Peterssen, and Hans Heyerdahl started another art school, where Boeckmann was a student until 1885.

In 1886, Boeckmann emigrated to America. He created paintings of several well-known Norwegian immigrants, including Reverend Elling Eielsen and Colonel Hans C. Heg of the 15th Wisconsin Volunteer Regiment in the Civil War Battle of Chickamauga. Other well-known Americans who posed for Boeckmann included President William McKinley, Governor William Merriam, Governor John Sargent Pillsbury, Cyrus Northrop, and John Burroughs. In 1893, Boeckmann won a gold medal at the World's Columbian Exposition in Chicago. He also received a silver medal for a portrait of Congressman Edmund Rice of St. Paul.

In 1905, Boeckmann permanently settled in Minneapolis, Minnesota. In 1914, he received an honorarium and an award for painting the historic fight that took place at Killdeer Mountain in North Dakota on July 26, 1864. The picture shows the troops of General Alfred Sully's expedition against the Sioux in the Dakota War of 1862. The nine by twelve painting hangs today in the senate conference room of the Minnesota State Capitol in Saint Paul, Minnesota.

== Personal ==
In 1905, Boeckmann married Marie Finstad, who had been born in Søndre Strand, Eidsvold, Norway. The Boeckmanns had two sons; Ralph Sigurd and Carl Falk. Carl Ludwig Boeckmann died in at his home in Minneapolis in 1923.

== Other sources ==
- Carl L. Boeckmann: Norwegian Artist in the New World (Marilyn Boeckmann Anderson. Norwegian- American Historical Association. Volume 28: Page 309)
- Prominent Artists and Exhibits of Their Work in Chicago (Reidar Rye Haugan, Chicago Norske Klub. Nordmanns-Forbundet, 24: 371—374, Volume 7, 1933)
- Minneapolis Sunday Tribune (Obituaries of Carl L. Boeckmann. September 23, 1923)
- Daglig Tidende of Minneapolis (Obituaries of Carl L. Boeckmann. September 23, 1923)
