= Peder Cappelen Thurmann =

German painter

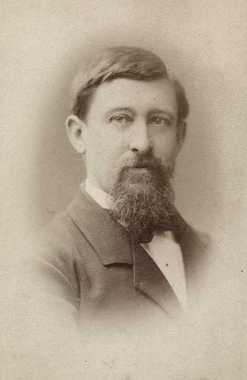
Peder Cappelen Thurmann (c.1880)

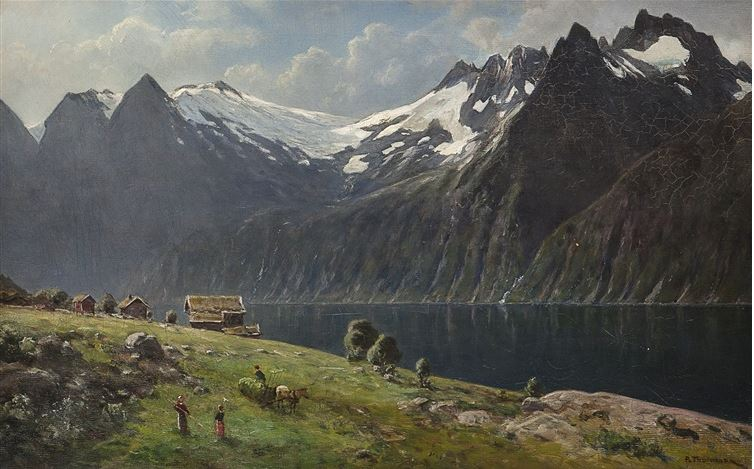
Fjord Landscape with Folk Figures

Peder Cappelen Thurmann (18 March 1839, Halden – 21 May 1919, Christiania) was a Norwegian landscape painter; associated with the Düsseldorfer Malerschule.

== Life and work ==
He was the son of pastor, Carl Fredrik Thurmann, and his wife, Ottilia Christine née Ottesen. Later, he became the brother-in-law of the missionary bishop, Nils Astrup. In 1854, he began attending the Royal Drawing School in Christiania, where he studied under Joachim Frich. After that, he went to Düsseldorf, as did most of the Norwegian artists of his time.

He was enrolled at the Kunstakademie Düsseldorf from 1856 to 1859. There, he studied with Joseph Wintergerst and Hans Fredrik Gude. He then spent several years in Munich; taking study trips to Bavaria and Italy.

He married Anna Maria Catharina Enzinger (1842–1925), and they had eight children. After returning to Christiania in 1869, he became a teacher of freehand drawing at the Royal Drawing School. From 1873 to 1875, he replaced Morten Müller at the private drawing school founded by Johan Fredrik Eckersberg. He was senior teacher at the Royal school from 1884 to 1912. During this time, he also travelled extensively; visiting Austria, Italy, Denmark and Germany. Hans Heyerdahl was one of his best known students.
