= Fanny Ingvoldstad =

Norwegian painter (1857–1935)

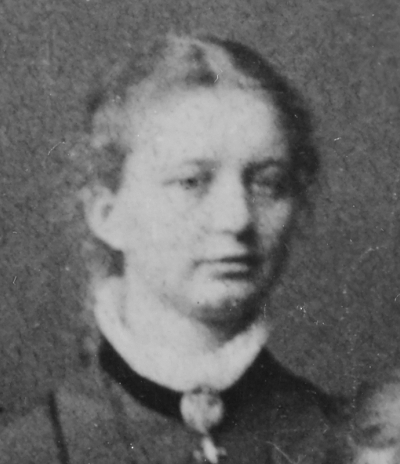
- Fanny Ingvoldstad in 1881
- Born: Fanny Hulda Marie Ingvoldstad; 13 April 1857; Hammersborg, Christiania, Norway
- Died: 14 May 1935 (aged 78); Oslo, Norway
- Resting place: Vår Frelsers Gravlund

Fanny Hulda Marie Ingvoldstad (13 April 1857 – 14 May 1935) was a Norwegian painter.

== Early and personal life ==
Fanny Hulda Marie Ingvoldstad was born on 13 April 1857 in Hammersborg to Høker Christopher Olsen Ingvoldstad and his wife Elisabeth "Lisbeth" Fredrikke Frederiksdatter. Ingvoldstad never married.

== Career ==
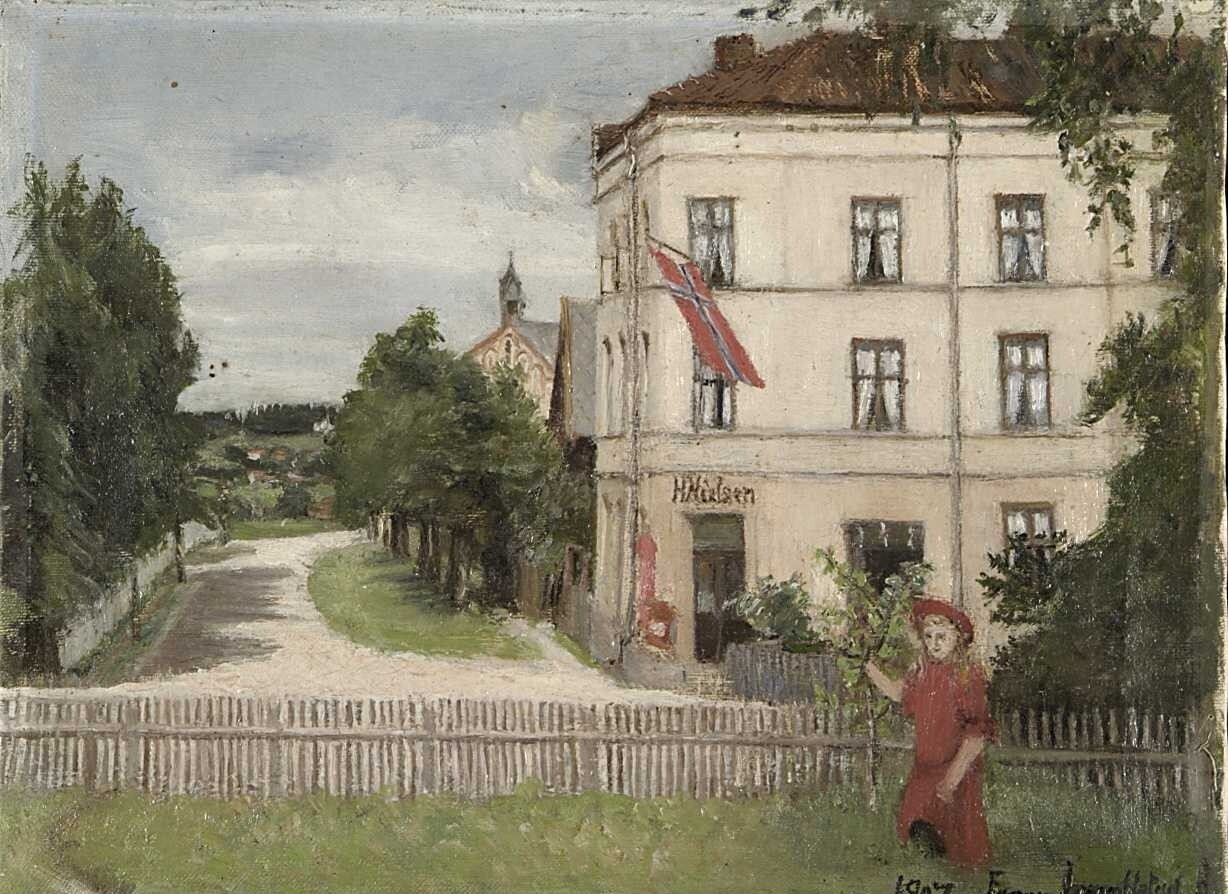
1907 oil painting of Lovisenberggt by Fanny Ingvoldstad

Ingvoldstad lived in Christiania, where she was a student at Knud Bergslien's school of painting from 1881–1884 and then was taught by Erik Werenskiold between 1884 and 1885.

In the 1880s and 1890s, Ingvoldstad exhibited interior and portrait paintings. She also painted several landscapes, two of which featuring Hammersborg and Lovisenberggatenare which are now in the possession of the Oslo City Museum. Ingvoldstad was a part of the Høstutstillingen exhibition from 1884–1886 and 1895–1896. As well as that, Ingvoldstad exhibited a small painting at the Kunstnerforeningnens spring exhibition in 1887.

In May 1892, Ingvoldstad, together with her former teacher Werenskiold and other artists, signed a petition in Christiania against the handling of a competition to sculpt a statue of Peter Tordenskjold and demanded a new jury to oversee the competition.

== Later life and death ==
She became less active at the beginning of the 20th century, but her work was exhibited at the Høstutstillingen exhibition in 1932, which focused on the first 25 years of the event.

Ingvoldstad died on 14 May 1935 in Oslo, at the age of 78. She was buried six days later on 20 May at Vår Frelsers Gravlund.
