= August Cappelen =

Norwegian painter (1827–1852)

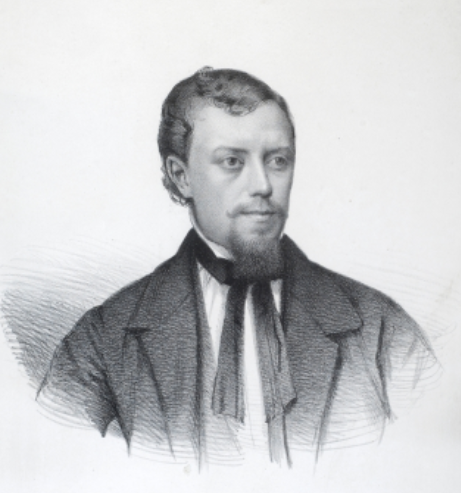
August Cappelen 1850

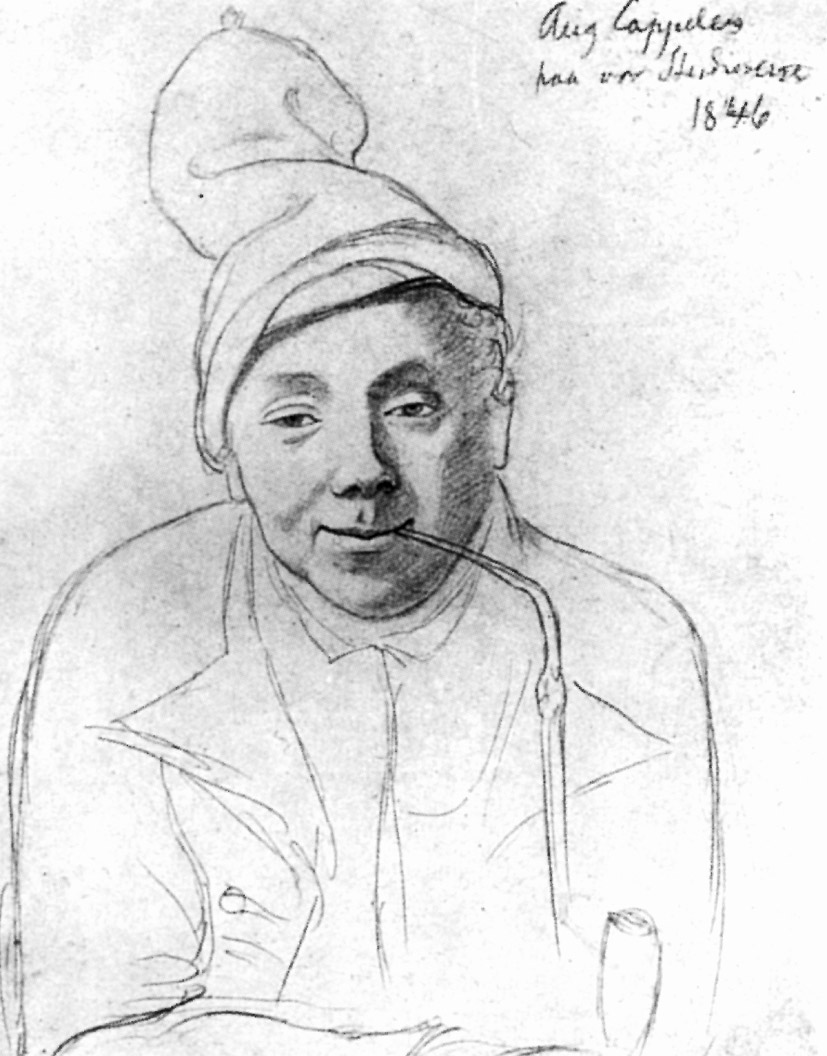
Portrait sketch by Hans Gude (1846)

Hermann August Cappelen (1 May 1827 – 8 March 1852) was a Norwegian painter. Cappelen was best known for his melancholic, dramatic and romantic landscape compositions.

== Background ==
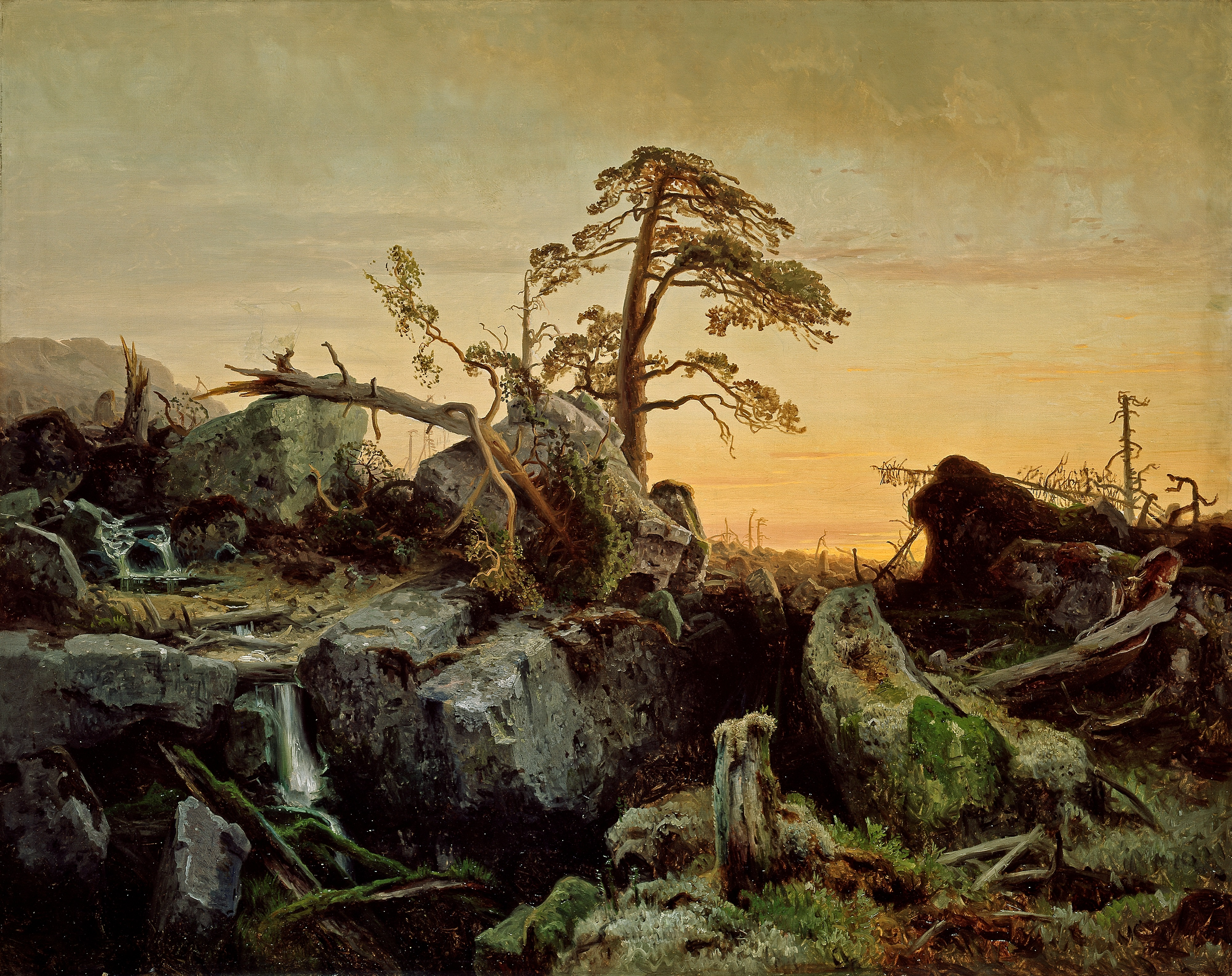
Dying forest (1851)

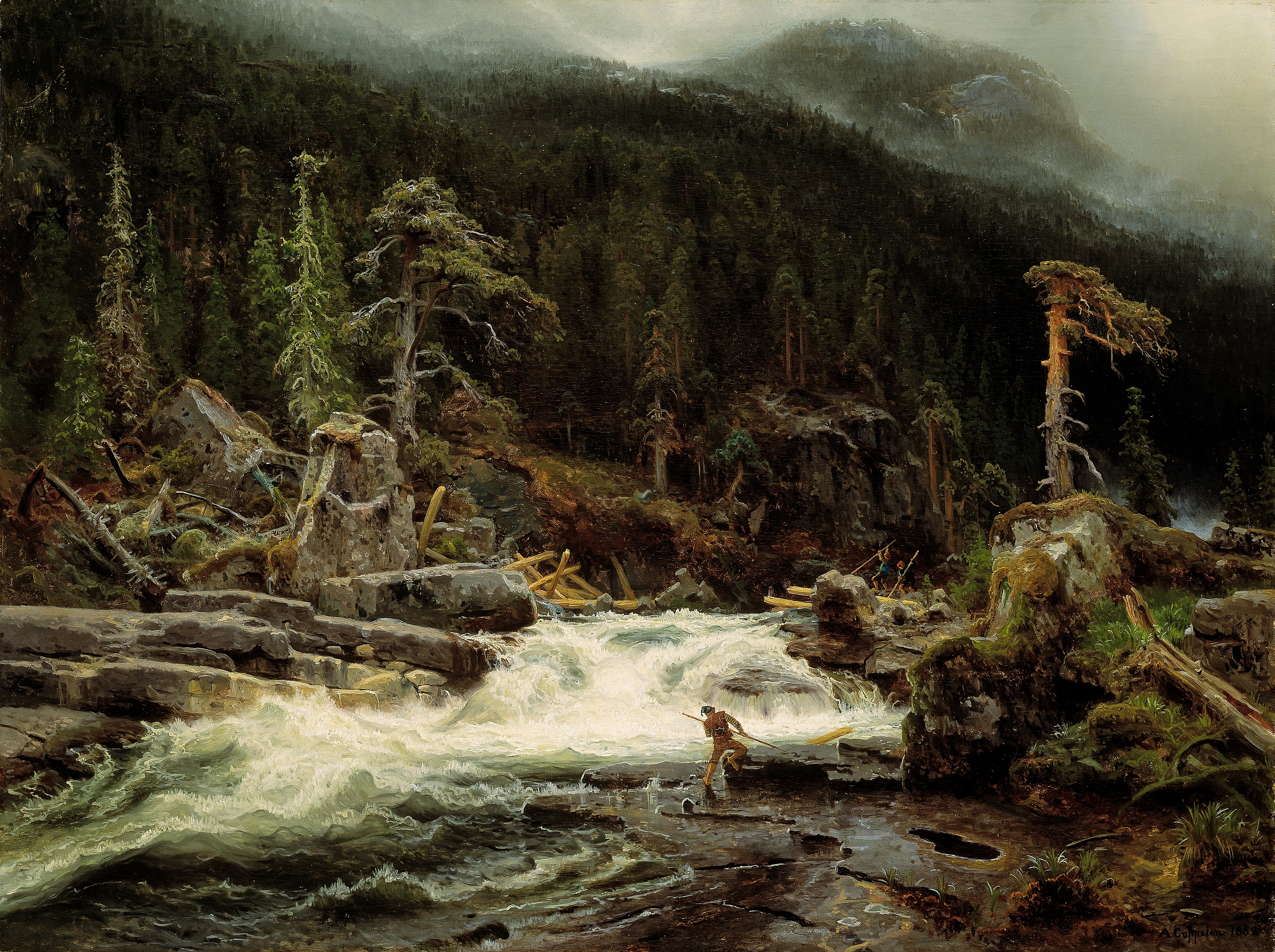
Waterfall in lower Telemark (1852)

Hermann August Cappelen was born in Skien, Norway. He was the son of Diderik von Cappelen (1795–1866) and Margaret Noble Severine Henriette Løvenskiold (1796–1866). Both the Løvenskiold and Cappelen families were prominent Norwegian families of merchants, land owners, civil servants and politicians. His family were the owners of prominent iron works and various other properties. His grandfather, Diderik von Cappelen (1761–1828), was member of the Norwegian Constituent Assembly at Eidsvoll Manor in 1814.

He grew up at Holden, a manor in Ulefoss in the Grenland district of the county of Telemark. After school graduation in Skien in 1845, he went to Christiania to take another exam at the Royal Frederick University. He subsequently went to Düsseldorf, where he studied with Hans Gude. Cappelen was a student at Kunstakademie Düsseldorf under Johann Wilhelm Schirmer in landscape painting class from 1846 to 1850. He is associated with the Düsseldorf school of painting.

== Career ==
Cappelen went on several study tours in Norway: Lom Municipality in Gudbrandsdalen (along with Gude and Johan Fredrik Eckersberg, 1846), Sogn and Hardanger (1847), as well as several summer residence in the countryside around Holden.

His most productive period was between 1850 and 1852, the two last years of his life. He struggled against gastric cancer of which he died, aged 25, at Düsseldorf in 1852.{{

== Legacy ==
The most important collection of Cappelen's art is in the National Museum of Art, Architecture and Design. The National Gallery owns three of his major works: Waterfall in Lower Telemark, Forest Lake and Dying Forest , the last unfinished, together with 26 smaller images and studies. There is a mountain landscape by him in the Oslo Kunstforening, the scene of which he took from Telemark. In 1952, a monument to him by Norwegian sculptor Dyre Vaa (1903–1980) was unveiled in a park in Holla Municipality.

== Notable works ==
- Kvernhus, 1850
- Utdøende urskog i uvær, 1851
- Morkne trær, 1851
- Tjern i tåke, 1851
- Foss i nedre Telemark, 1852
- Skogtjern i Nedre Telemark, 1852
- Svarttjern, 1852
- Møllefossen, 1852
- Utdøende urskog, 1852
