= At the Window =

1881 painting by Hans Heyerdahl

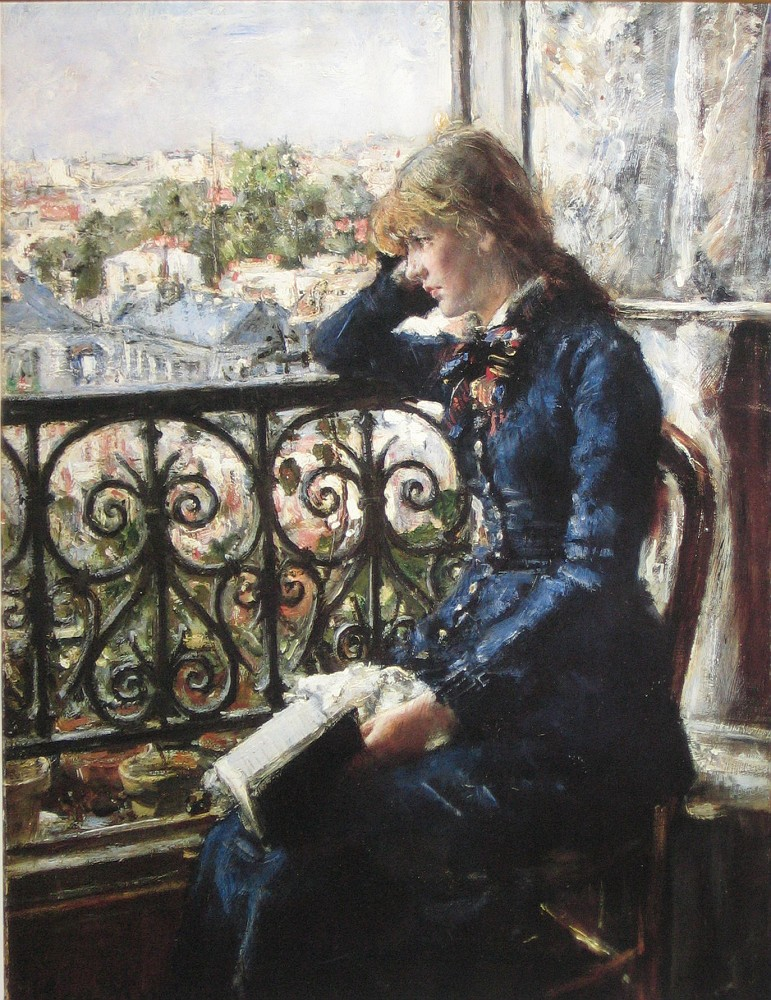
- Artist: Hans Heyerdahl
- Year: 1881
- Medium: Oil on canvas
- Dimensions: 46 cm × 37 cm (18 in × 15 in)
- Location: National Gallery; Oslo

At the Window is an 1881 painting by the Norwegian Realism painter, Hans Heyerdahl, which is held in the collection of the National Gallery, Norway.

At the Window differs noticeably from Heyerdahl’s earlier works, which were influenced by the dark, stringent style of the Munich school. This picture showcases what Heyerdahl learned from modern French painting.

== See also ==
- 1881 in art
