= Hans Heyerdahl =

Norwegian Realist painter (1857–1913)

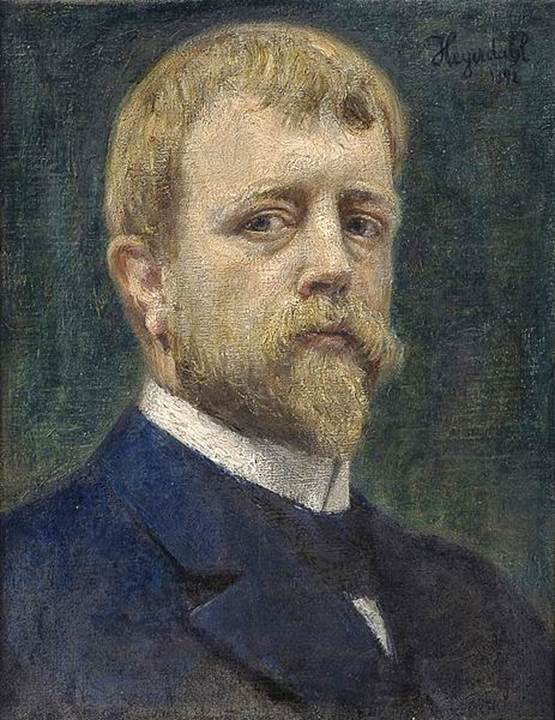
Self-portrait (1892)

Hans Olaf Halvor Heyerdahl (8 July 1857 – 10 October 1913) was a Norwegian Realist painter. His work was characterized by naturalism and focused largely on portraits and landscape paintings.

== Biography ==
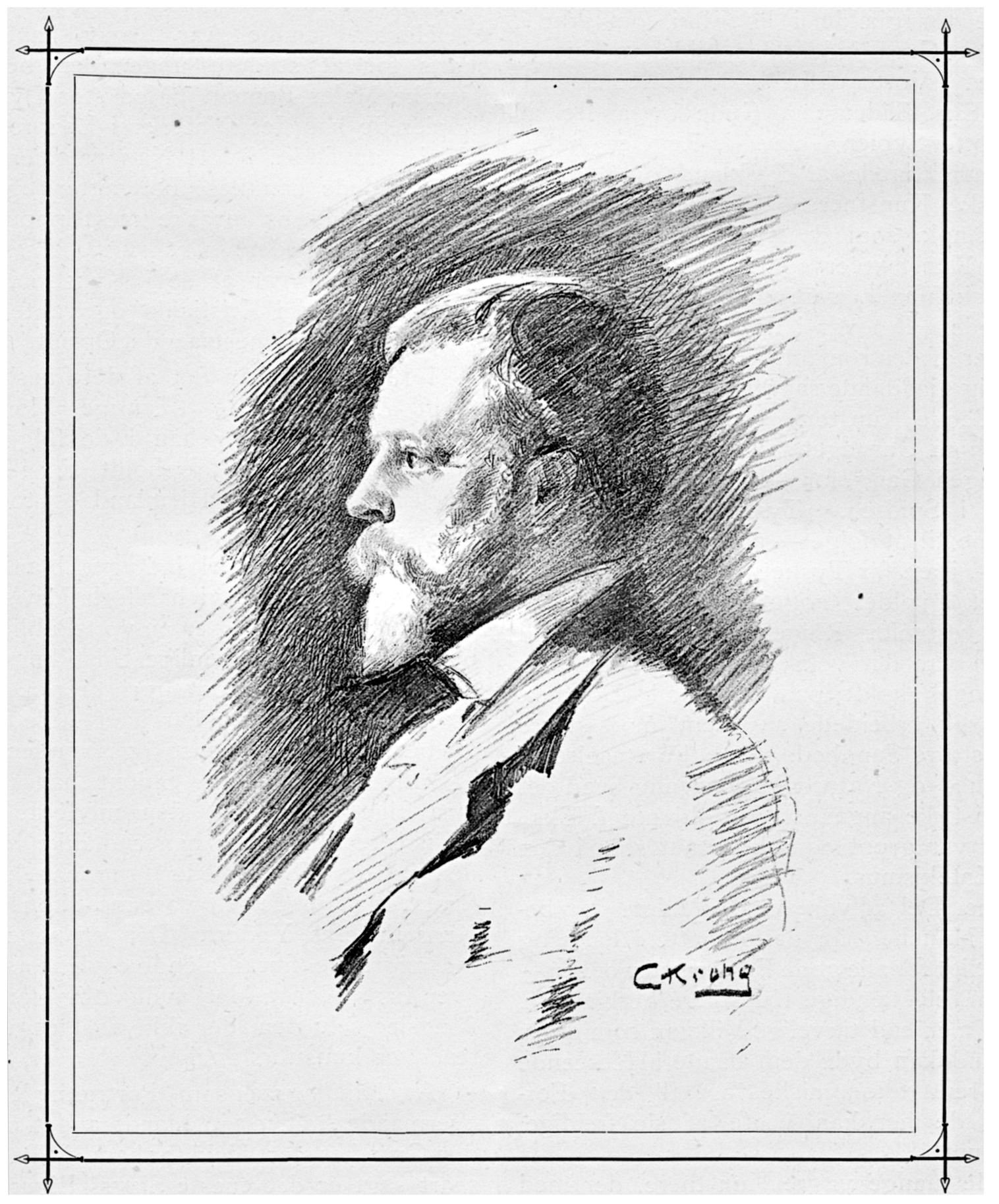
Hans Heyerdahl by Christian Krohg (1891)

Heyerdahl was born in Smedjebacken, Sweden. He was the son of Halvor Heyerdahl and Hilda Margretha Haak (1834–1917). His father was a prominent engineer and architect. In 1859, the family moved to Drammen, where his father took up the joint posts of city engineer and fire chief.

Heyerdahl was educated in Christiania (now Oslo), Munich (1874–1877) and Paris (1878–1880). He began his education with the intent of following in his father's footsteps, but soon discovered that he was more attracted to drawing and art. In 1873, he entered the Norwegian National Academy of Craft and Art Industry and studied under Peder Cappelen Thurmann, a landscape artist trained in Düsseldorf. From 1874 until 1877, he was enrolled at the Academy of Fine Arts, Munich, where his professors were Wilhelm Lindenschmit and Ludwig von Löfftz, who encouraged him to switch from landscapes to historical painting and portraits.

From 1878 to 1882, he lived in Paris and won a third-place Medal at the Exposition Universelle for his painting Adam og Eva drives ut av Paradiset. Finished in 1877 under the guidance of Wilhelm Lindenschmit, it featured the expulsion of Adam and Eve from the Garden of Eden. He made his début at the Salon of 1879 with a portrait of the composer Johan Svendsen. While in Paris, he came under the influence of Léon Bonnat and took up painting outdoors (En plein air). In 1881, his work Det døende barn won the Grand Prix du Florence at the Salon, which enabled him to spend two years studying in Italy.

After finishing his studies, he returned to Norway and settled in Christiania, where he gave private art lessons to support his studio. He started a private painting school together with Christian Krohg and Erik Werenskiold. His summers were spent painting in Åsgårdstrand, where he inspired Edvard Munch, who was just beginning his career. In addition to his landscapes, he did scenes from Norwegian history and several portraits of notable people, including Frits Thaulow (1885), Knut Hamsun (1893) and Henrik Ibsen (1894). After 1900, he spent another six years in Paris, where his paintings took on a more melancholy tone. In 1904, he was named a Knight in the Order of St. Olav. He died during 1913 in Oslo.

The largest publicly available collection of Heyerdahl's pictures can be found in the Heyerdahl room at the Drammen Museum. Several of his more important works can also be seen in the National Museum of Art, Architecture and Design (Nasjonalmuseet for kunst, arkitektur og design) in Oslo.

== Selected works ==
- Kunstnerviften (Artifacts, 1898)
- Adam og Eva drives ut av Paradiset (Adam and Eve Driven from Paradise, 1877)
- Det døende barn (, The Dying Child, 1889)
- Maleren Frits Thaulow (The Painter Frits Thaulow, c.1885)
- Professor Ernst Sars (1886)
- Redaktør Ola Thommessen (The Editor Ola Thommessen, 1888)
- Ved vinduet ( By the Window, 1881)
- Svart-Anna (Black-Anna, c.1887)
- Den danske maler Frants Henningsen (The Danish Painter Frants Henningsen, c.1881)
- Den gamle mølle (The Old Mill, 1884)
- Dikteren Henrik Ibsen (The Writer Henrik Ibsen, ca. 1893)
- Dobbeltportrett, kopi etter Bellini (Double Portrait after Bellini, 1878–1879)
- Forfatteren Gunnar Heiberg (The Author Gunnar Heiberg, 1901)
- Fra Åsgårdstrand (From Åsgårdstrand, ca. 1887)
- Gammel fisker (Old Fisherman, 1891)
- Italienerpike (Italian Clergyman, ca. 1880)
- Karen Marie Bætzmann, née Fougner (c.1880)

== Gallery ==
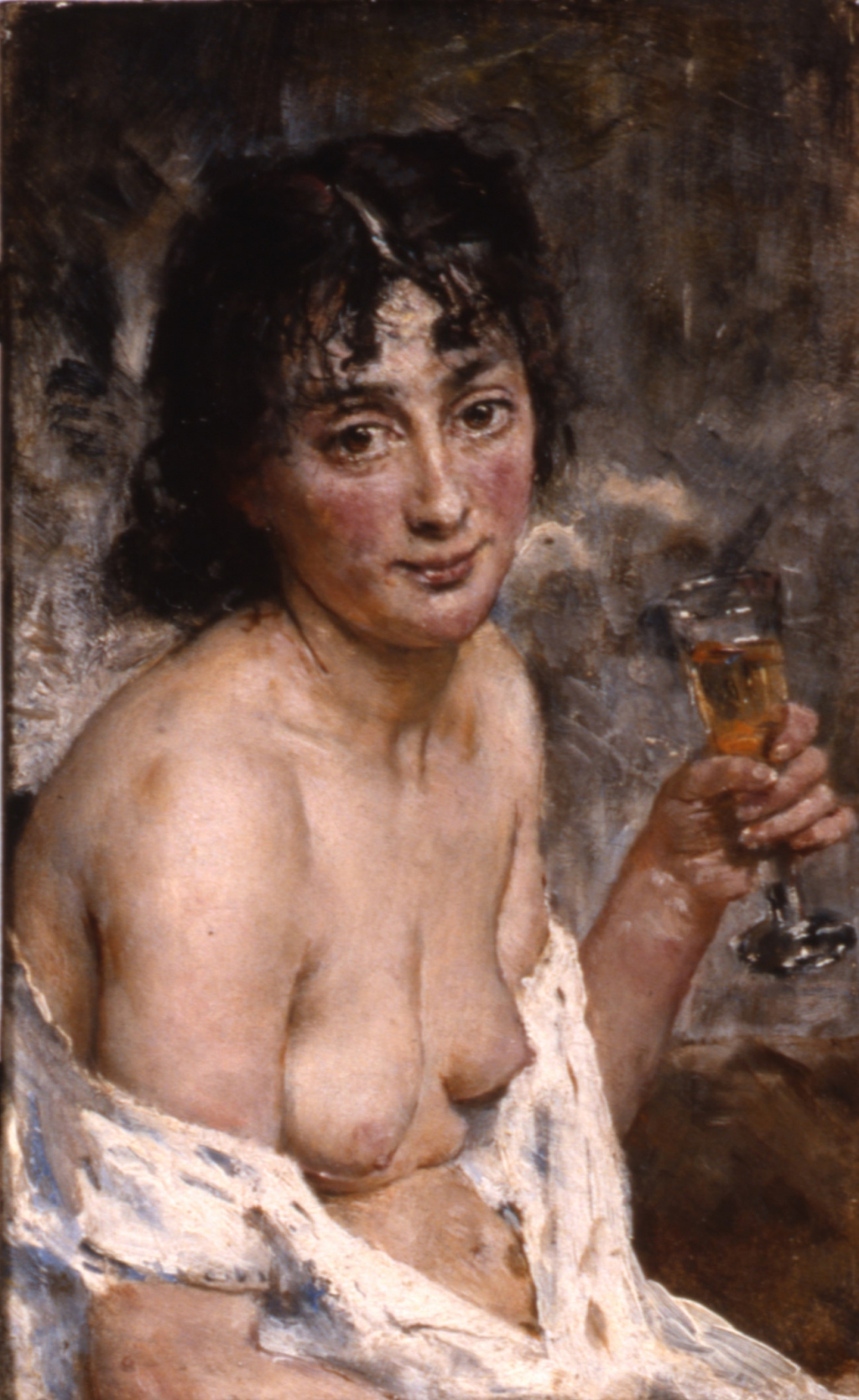
The Champagne Girl (1881, Champagnepiken)

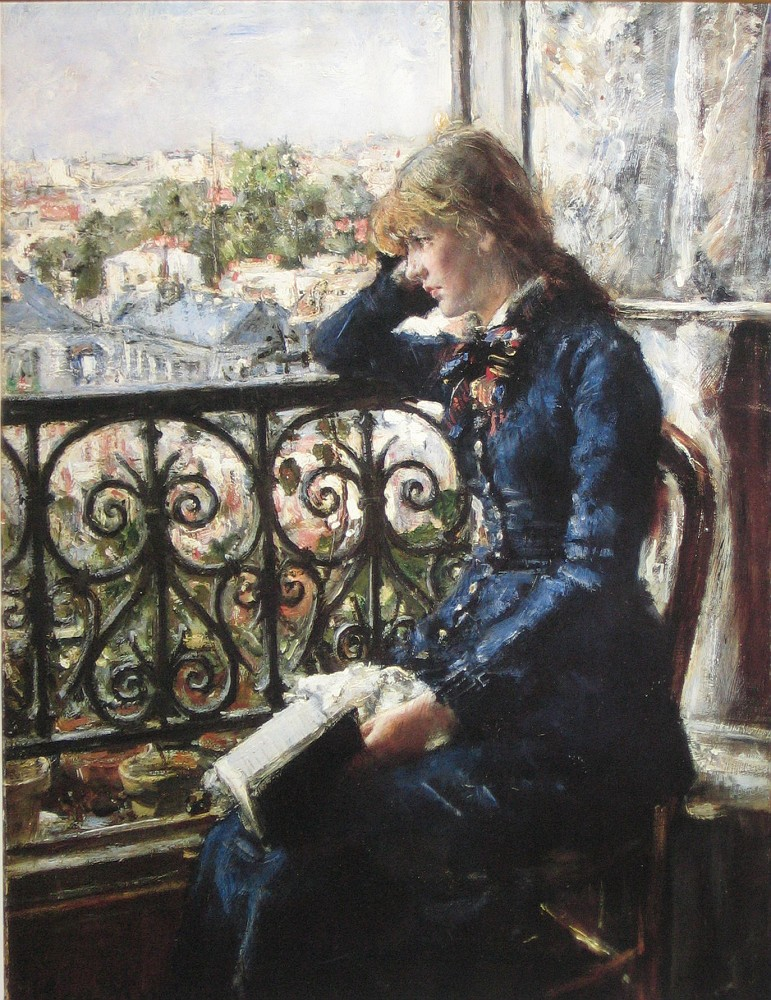
At the Window (1881)

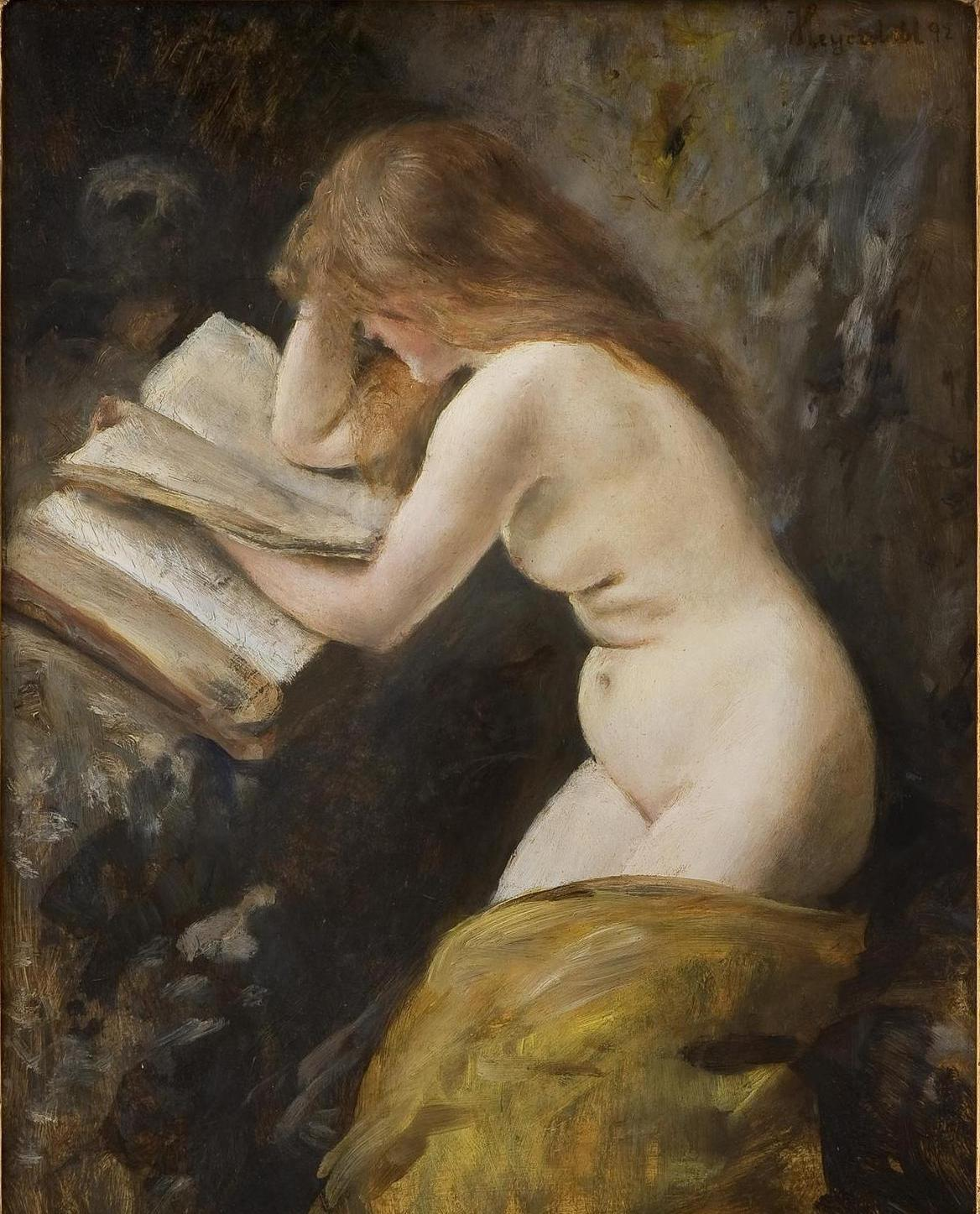
Maria Magdalena (1882)

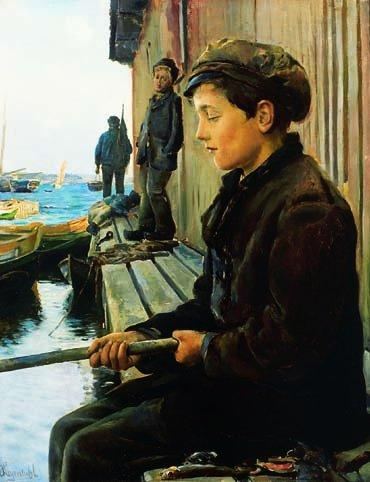
Fisher Boy (1886)

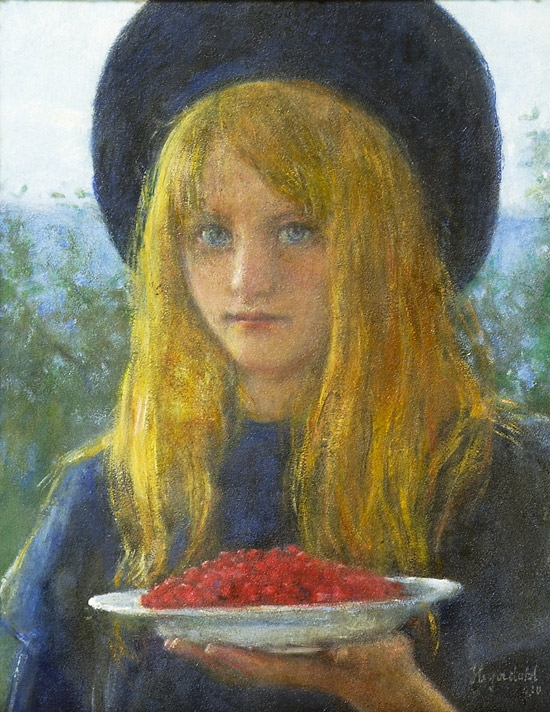
Girl with Currants (c.1890)

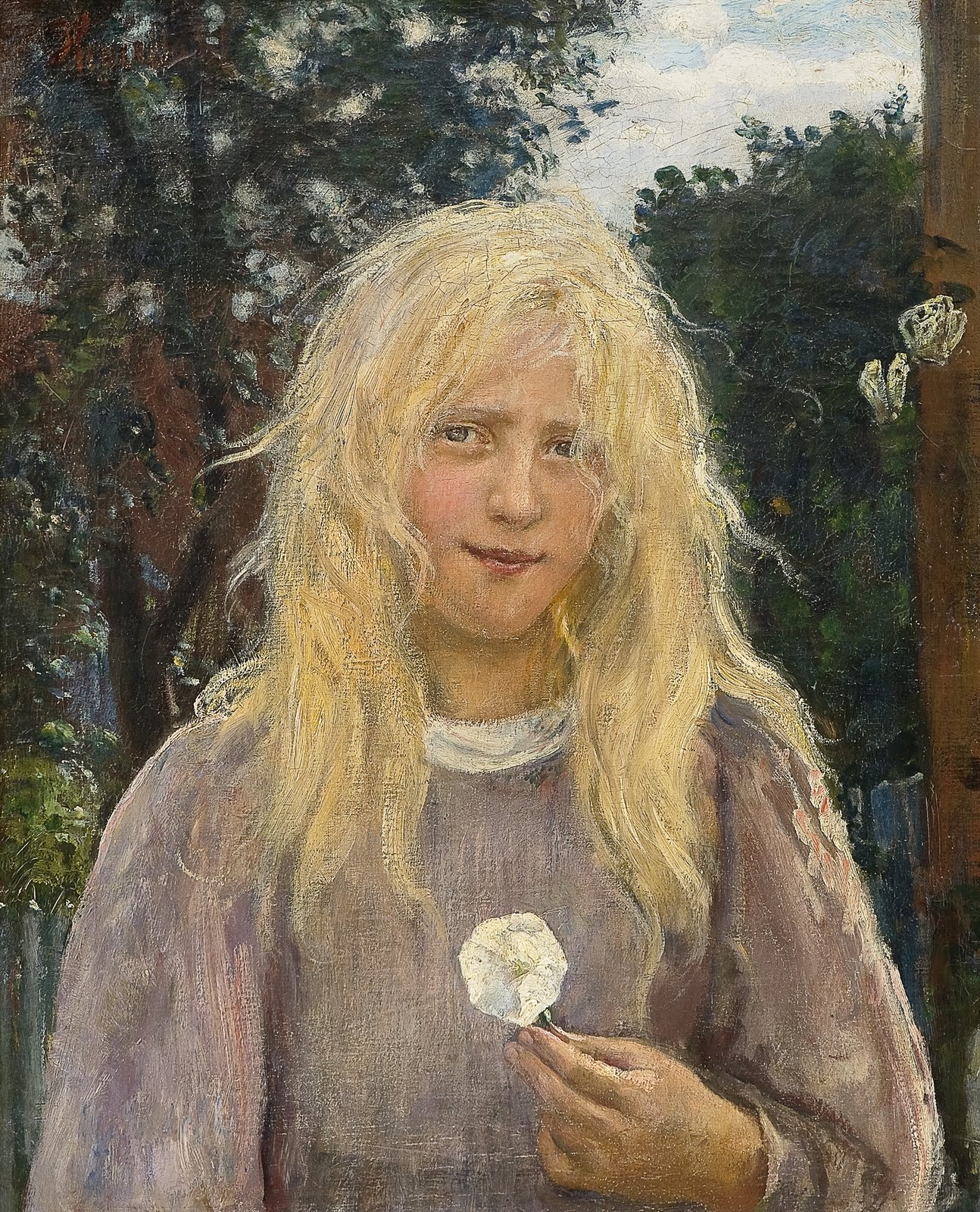
The Girl with Linen Hair (c.1890)

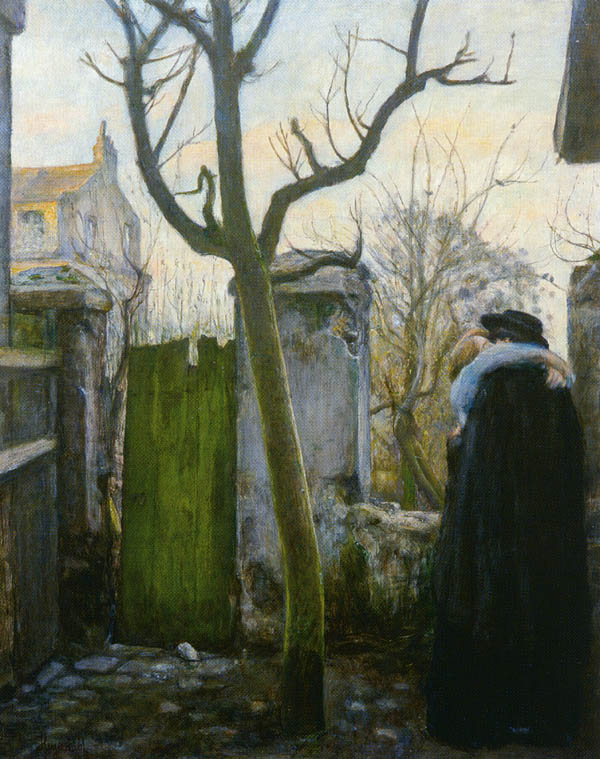
An Idyll (1906)
