= Johan Fredrik Eckersberg =

Norwegian painter (1822–1870)

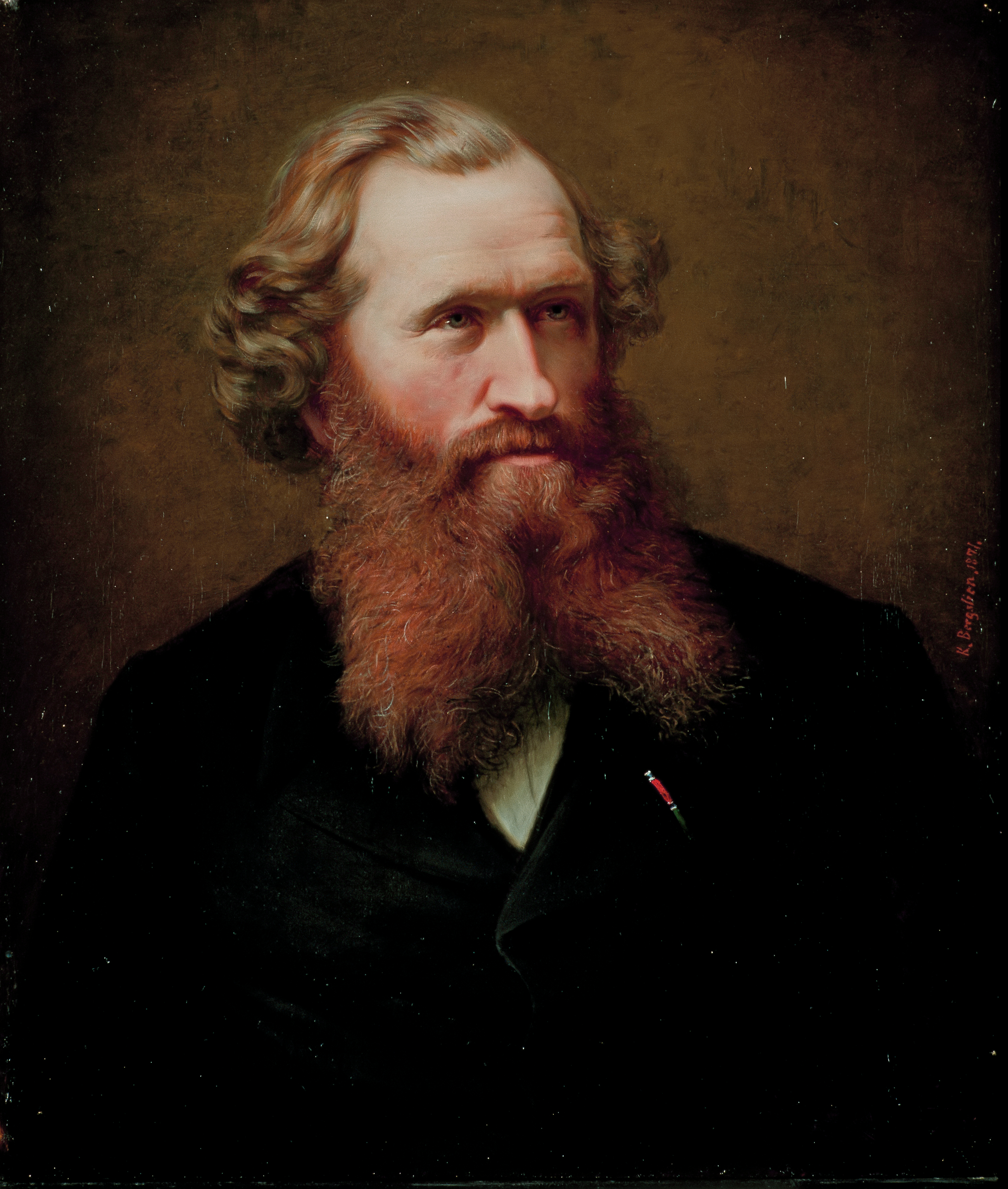
Portrait of J.F. Eckersberg Knud Bergslien (1871)

Johan Fredrik Eckersberg (16 June 1822 – 13 July 1870) was a Norwegian painter most noted for his landscapes. Eckersberg was a prominent figure in the transition from Romanticism to Realism in 19th-century Norwegian art, both as an artistic painter and a teacher at his own art school in Oslo.

== Background ==
Johan Fredrik Eckersberg was born at Drammen in Buskerud county, Norway. He was placed in a mercantile office in Oslo (then Christiania) at the age of eighteen, but having previously been in the Netherlands for several years, and visited Amsterdam, he had there imbibed a taste for art, so that after two years, against his father's wish, he relinquished his post, and entered the technical drawing-school in Christiania. Rapidly developing his talent for painting, Eckersberg trained at the Norwegian National Academy of Craft and Art Industry (Tegneskolen) under Johannes Flintoe (1843–46). He obtained one of the Government stipend (Statens stipend) for young artists and went to Düsseldorf, where he studied landscape painting under Johann Wilhelm Schirmer from 1846–48 at the Kunstakademie Düsseldorf.

== Career ==
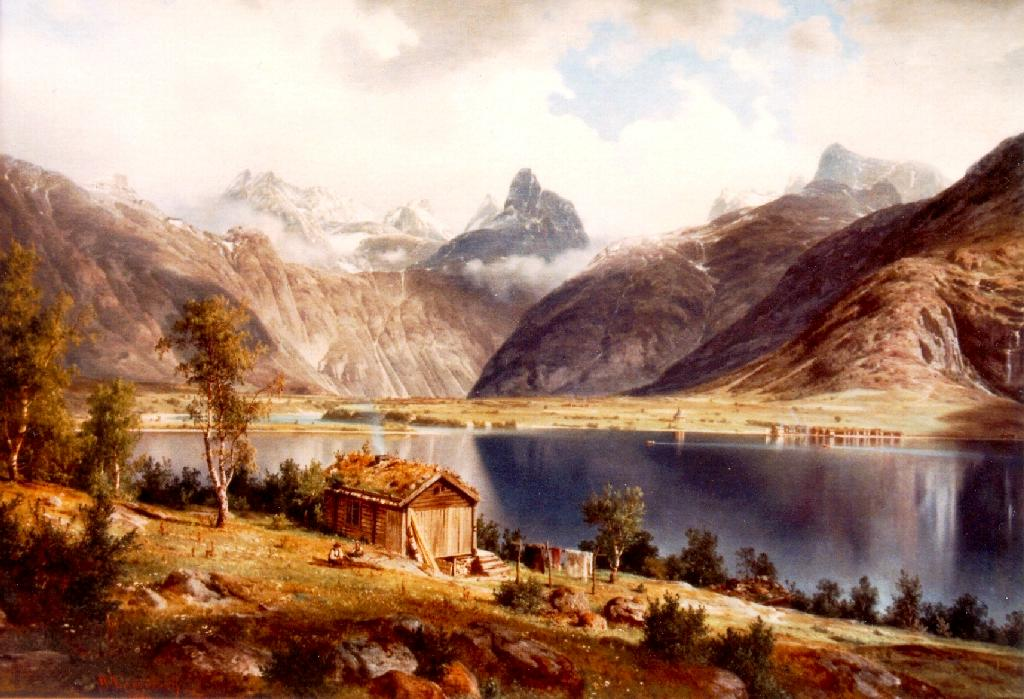
Romsdalshorn i Rauma (1865)

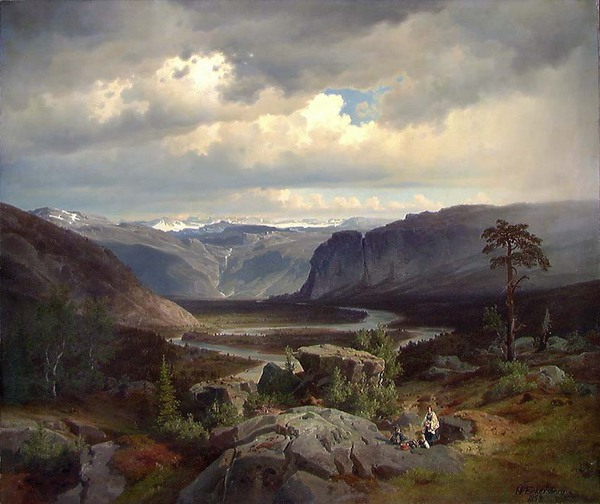
Fra Valle i Setesdal (1852)

During the summer of 1846, Eckersberg followed Hans Gude and August Cappelen on a study trip to Gudbrandsdalen, where they visited Vaage Municipality and Lom Municipality. He returned to Christiania in 1848, where his works commanded a very fair sale. Eckersberg was plagued by bad lungs and needed to stay in a warm climate. In 1852, he was obliged to visit Madeira for his health, where, having first devoted his time to portrait painting to increase his rather slender funds, he traveled over the island, making sketches, from which he afterwards painted his series of pictures of Madeira.

In 1850, he was admitted as a member of the Norwegian National Academy of Fine Arts, which served as the country's highest artistic authority. He also sat on the board of the National Gallery and Drawing School (1851–69) and the board of the Christiania Art Society from 1864. In 1859, he established an art school at Lille Grensen in Christiania. A number of later famous painters were students at his art school, including Gerhard Munthe and Christian Skredsvig. After his death, the school would be continued by Morten Müller and Knud Bergslien.

Every summer from the date of his return to Norway he visited grand and picturesque spots in his native country, making sketches from which he afterwards elaborated his pictures. His most important images date from the 1860s. His Grand Panoramic Scene from a Norwegian Plateau was exhibited at the Paris Exposition Universelle (1867).

He was not a great colourist and was too much a realist to be led by imagination. However, he made use of clear, cool colors, with magnificent views of plains and distant mountains. The National Museum of Art, Architecture and Design in Oslo owns two of his major works, Fra Valle i Setesdal (1852) and Fra Jotunheimen (1866), besides ten smaller landscapes.

== Personal life ==
In 1850 Johan Fredrik Eckersberg married Laura Martin Hansen (1821–1878). Eckersberg was made a knight of the Order of Vasa in 1866 and was appointed a knight of the Royal Norwegian Order of St. Olav in 1870. Eckersberg died of tuberculosis at Sandvika near Christiania.

== Selected works ==
- Fra Valle i Setesdal, 1852
- Jesus i Getsemane, 1854
- Brudeferd på Hardangerfjorden, 1865
- Norsk høyfjell, soloppgang, 1865
- Solnedgang på fjellet, 1865
- Fra Jotunheimen, 1866
- Mannesker i Fjellandskap, 1862
