= Lars Jonson Haukaness =

American painter

- Born: February 28, 1862; Folkedal, Norway
- Died: September 4, 1929 (aged 67); Calgary, Alberta, Canada
- Occupations: impressionist painter and art instructor
- Known for: landscape painter

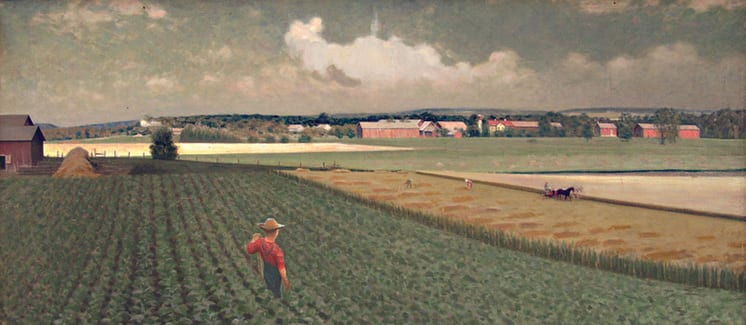
Torger Thompson Farm, Vesterheim Norwegian-American Museum

Lars Jonson Haukaness (February 28, 1862 – September 4, 1929) was a Norwegian born American-Canadian impressionist painter and art instructor who was known for his landscapes.

== Death and legacy ==
Haukaness died in 1929, while head of the art department at the institute. He died of heart disease while camping in the Ptarmigan Valley in the Canadian Rockies, falling from his horse while trying to reach the resort at Lake Louise. He was buried in Banff, Alberta.

== Other sources ==
- Bumsted, J. M. (1999). Dictionary of Manitoba Biography. University of Manitoba Press. pp. 106–107. ISBN 978-0-88755-318-9.
- Collinson, Helen (1991). Lars Haukaness: Northern Vision. Edmonton Art Gallery. ISBN 978-0-88950-081-5.
- Loken, Gulbrand (1980). From Fjord to Frontier: A History of Norwegians in Canada. Canada, Multiculturalism Directorate. Mcclelland and Stewart.
- Haugan, Reidar Rye. Prominent Artists and Exhibits of Their Work in Chicago (Chicago: Nordmanns-Forbundet, 24: 371—374, Volume 7, 1933)
