= Morten Müller =

Norwegian painter (1828–1911)

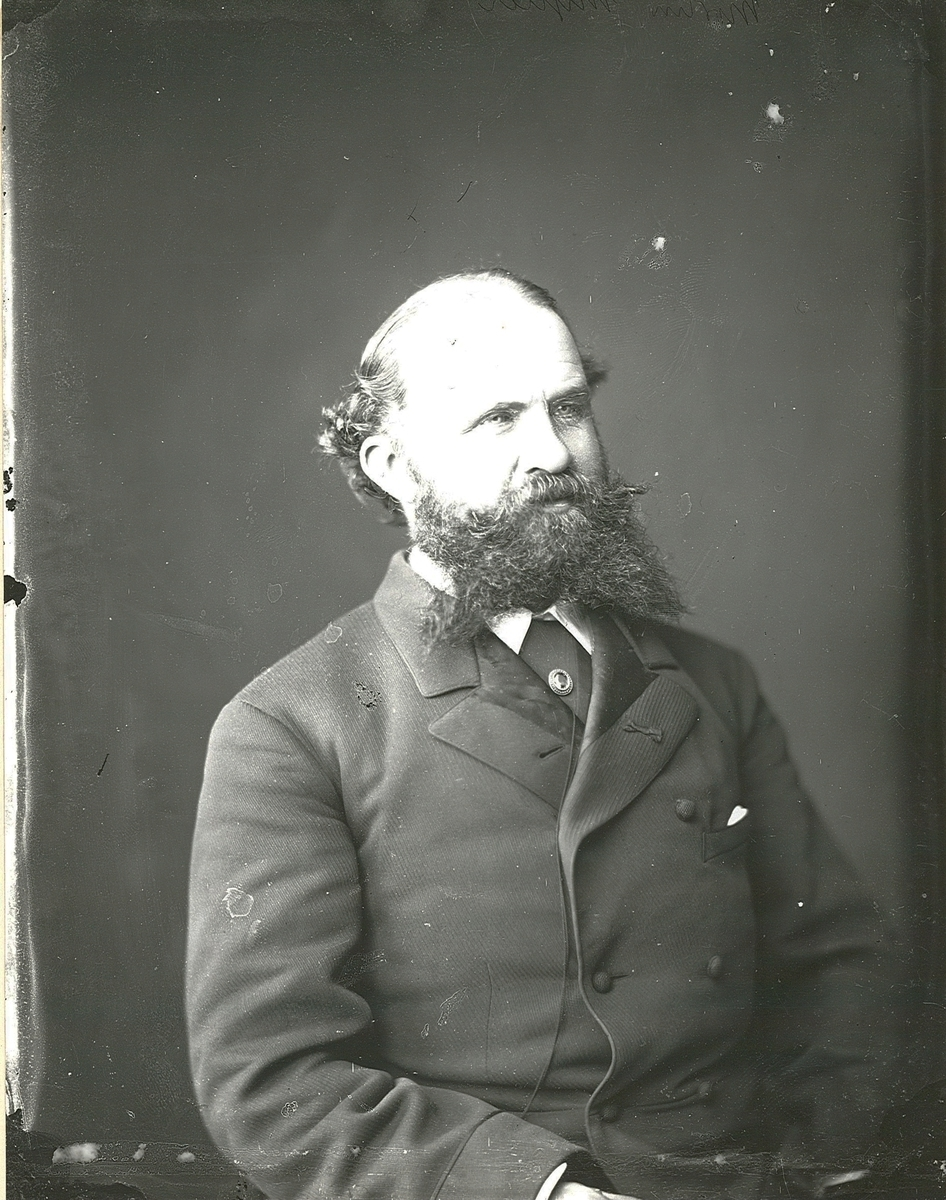
- Morten Müller (ca. 1895)
- Born: 13 February 1828; Holmestrand, Norway
- Died: 10 February 1911 (aged 82)
- Occupation: Landscape painter
- Awards: Order of St. Olav

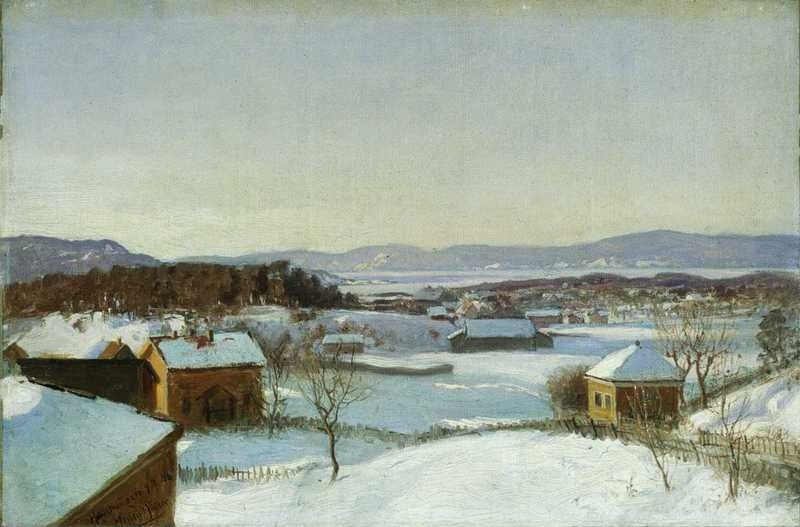
View Over Bondejordet and Surroundings (1868)

Morten Müller (13 February 1828 – 10 February 1911) was a Norwegian landscape painter.

== Biography ==
Morten Müller was born by the Christianiafjord at Holmestrand, in Vestfold County, Norway. Morten Müller began his art studies with Adolph Tidemand and Hans Gude in Düsseldorf, Germany, from 1847 to 1848. From 1850 he was again a student at the Kunstakademie Düsseldorf, with Johann Wilhelm Schirmer as a teacher.

From 1850 to 1851, Müller painted with the Swedish landscape painter Marcus Larson in Stockholm. From 1866 to 1873, Morten Müller lived in Oslo, where he taught together with Knud Bergslien, first at the art school operated by Johan Fredrik Eckersberg. Later he continued working with Knud Bergslien at the Bergslien school of Art. In 1875, Müller returned to Düsseldorf, where he lived the rest of his life. He is associated with the Düsseldorf school of painting. Among his landscape motifs are fjords and pine forests. He is represented with several works in the National Gallery of Norway.

In 1875, Morten Müller was appointed as a painter to the Swedish Royal Court. He was knighted into the Order of Vasa in 1869 and in 1874 became an honorary member of the Royal Swedish Academy of Arts in Stockholm. He was made a Knight of the Order of St. Olav during 1882 and became a commander of the 2nd Class of 1895.

== Notable works ==
- Fra omegnen av Christianiafjorden (“View on Christianiafjord,” 1855)
- Norsk Landskab med Vandsag (“Pine Forest in Norway,” 1860)
- Ved Hardangerfjordens utløp (“Entrance to Hardangerfjord,” 1866)
- Ulriksdal (1870)
- Romsdalfjord (1876)
- Norsk fossefall med furuskog (“Norwegian waterfall and pine forest,” 1879)
- Norsk fiskehavn ved Christianiafjorden (“Norwegian fishing port in Christianiafjord,” 1880)
- Norsk urskog (“Norwegian virgin forest,” 1883)
- Norwegische Fernsicht (“Norwegian vista,” 1886)
- “Forest Lake by Moonlight” (1892)

== Gallery ==
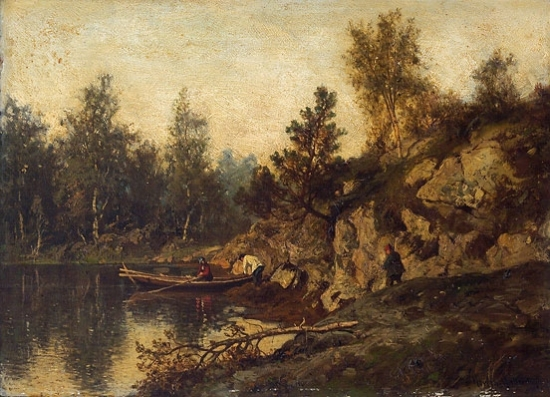
Lake with Rowboat (1876)

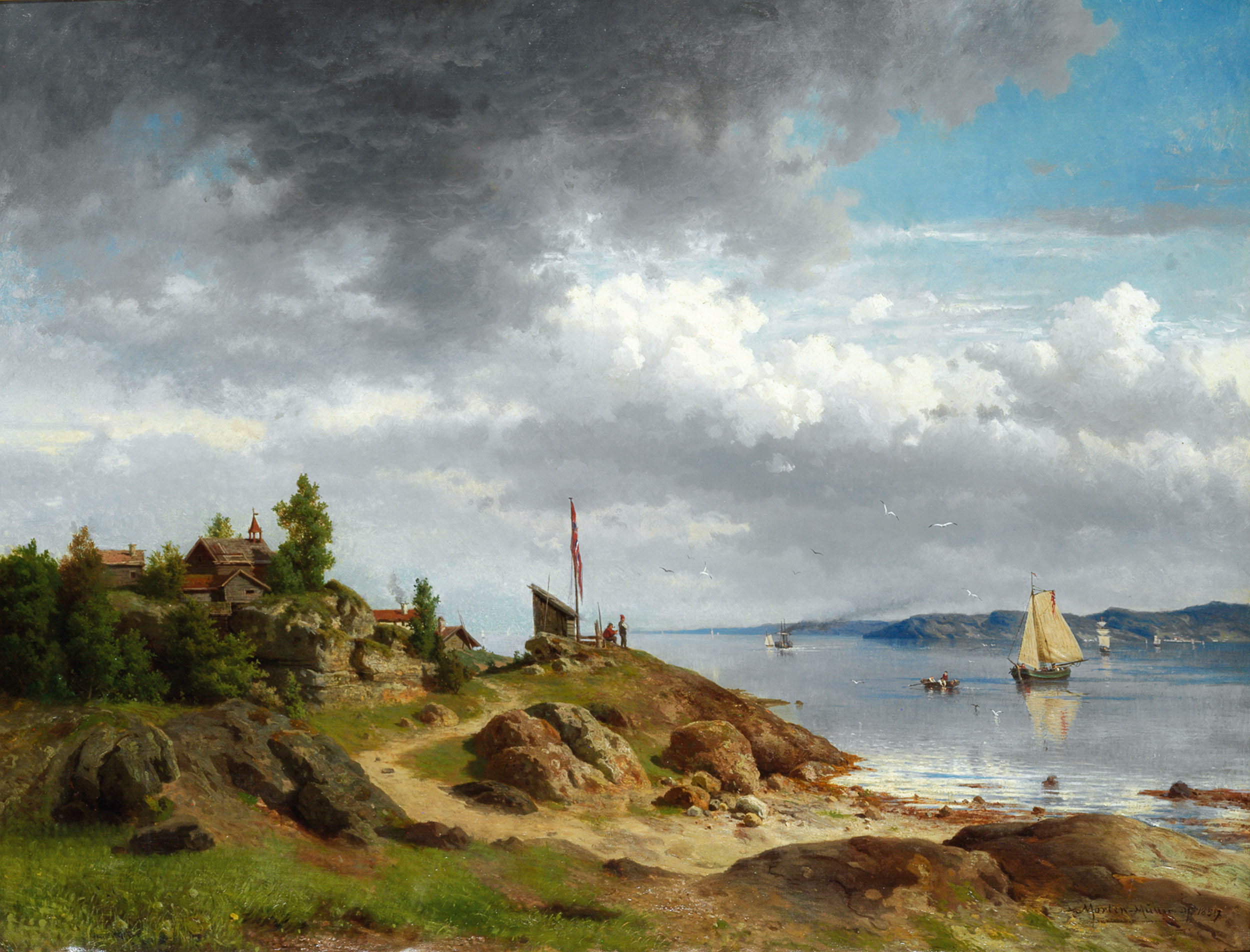
Norse Seascape with Figures (1857)

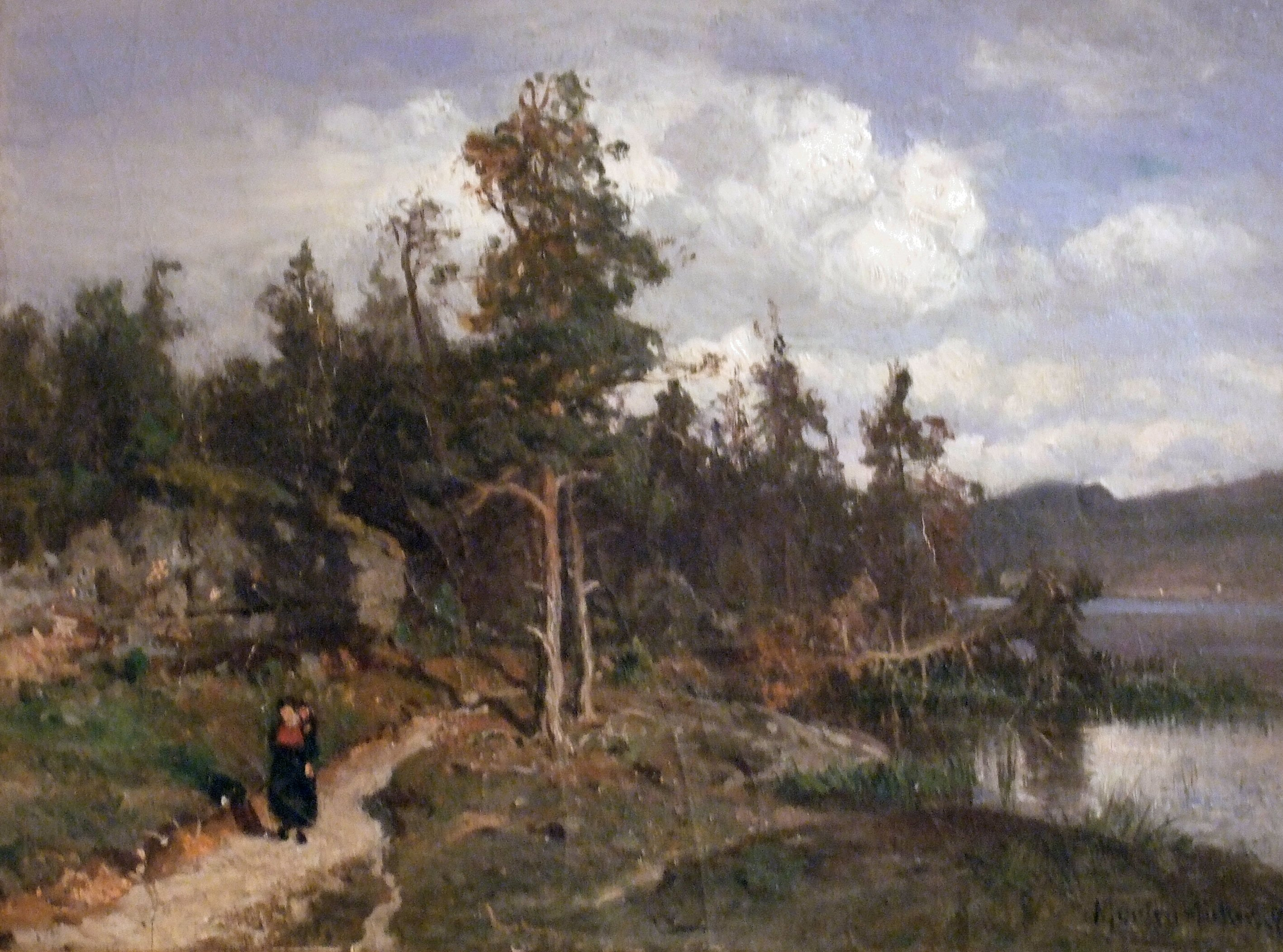
Landscape. Private Island (1874)
