= Henrik Sørensen =

Norwegian painter (1882–1962)

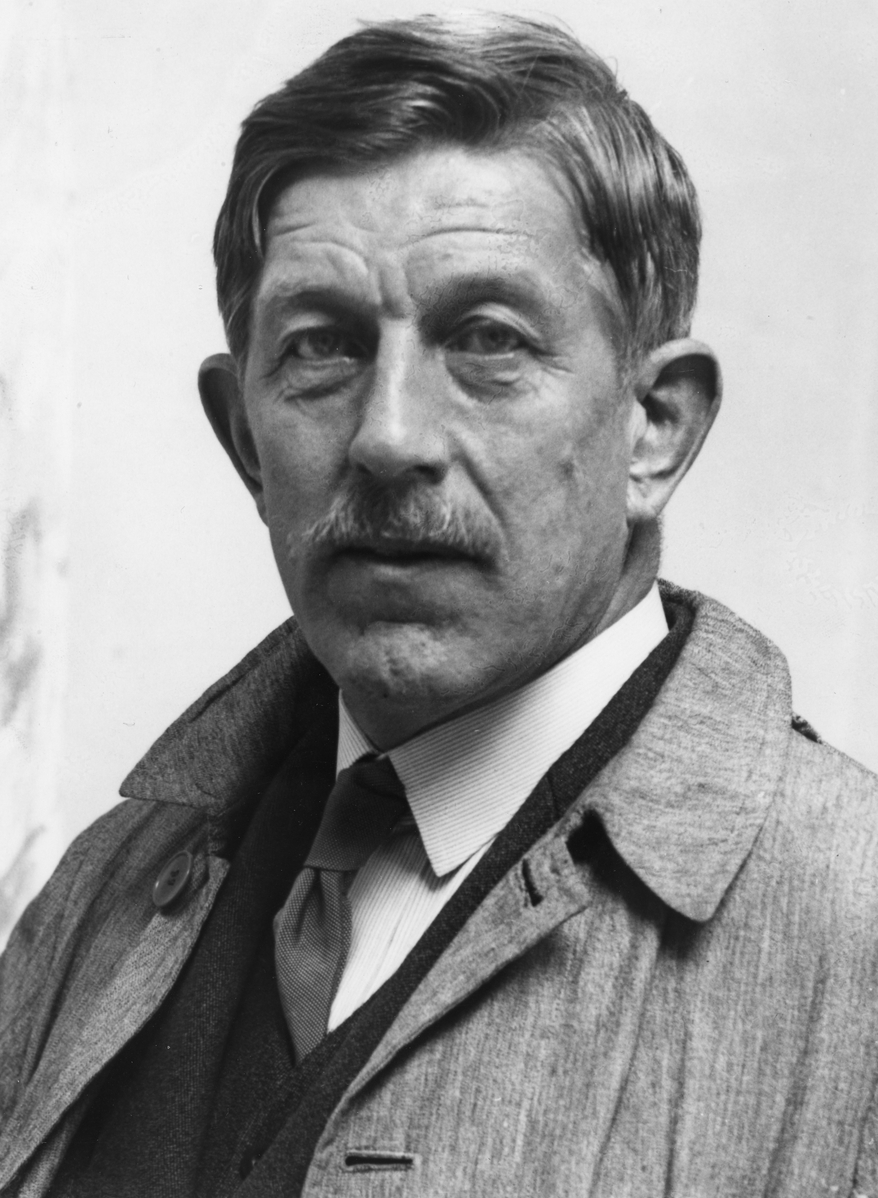
- Sørensen, c. 1935-40
- Born: 12 February 1882; Fryksände, Sweden
- Died: 24 February 1962 (aged 80)
- Occupation: painter
- Children: Sven Oluf Sørensen
- Relatives: Halfdan Cleve (brother-in-law); Cissi Cleve (niece)

Henrik Sørensen (12 February 1882 – 24 February 1962) was a Norwegian painter.

== Personal life ==
Sørensen was born in Fryksände in Sweden as a son of Severin Sørensen and Helene Høibraaten. He was married to Gudrun Klewe, and is father of physicist Sven Oluf Sørensen. He was a brother-in-law of composer Halfdan Cleve.

== Painting career ==
Sørensen studied drawing at the Norwegian National Academy of Craft and Art Industry in Kristiania in 1904 and from 1906 to 1908. He studied with Kristian Zahrtmann in Copenhagen from 1904 to 1905, and became fascinated by the French impressionists while studying at the art school Académie Colarossi in Paris during the autumn of 1905. He studied painting with Henri Matisse in Paris from 1908 to 1910. His breakthrough was the painting Svartbækken from 1908. His painting Varietéartist from 1910 caused big headlines, and was bought by the Swedish painter and art collector Prince Eugén, Duke of Närke. He is represented in the National Gallery with several paintings, as well as in other Scandinavian museums, and has decorated a large wall at the Oslo City Hall. In 1939 the Government of Norway donated his iconic wall painting "The Dream of Peace" in today the Library of the United Nations Office Geneva to the League of Nations.

He illustrated books by Jørgen Moe, Bjørnstjerne Bjørnson, Ragnhild Jølsen and Aasmund Olavsson Vinje, and painted portraits of the writers Ingeborg Refling Hagen (1932) and Sigurd Christiansen (1936). His painting Jødene (Israels folk) is from 1943. A painting by Sørensen was used on Norwegian 10 kroner notes from 1954 to 1973. He has painted altarpieces to the Linköping Cathedral and the Hamar Cathedral.

During World War II he was held at the Grini concentration camp for one week, January–February 1945. He was a member of the Norwegian Association for Women's Rights.

== Legacy ==
In 1968 a memorial of Sørensen, made by sculptor Ragnhild Butenschøn, was raised in Lillestrøm. Galleries with works by Sørensen were later raised at two of his favourite painting locations, Holmsbu Billedgalleri in 1973, and Vinje Biletgalleri in Smørklepp in 1991.
