= Sven Oluf Sørensen =

Norwegian physicist

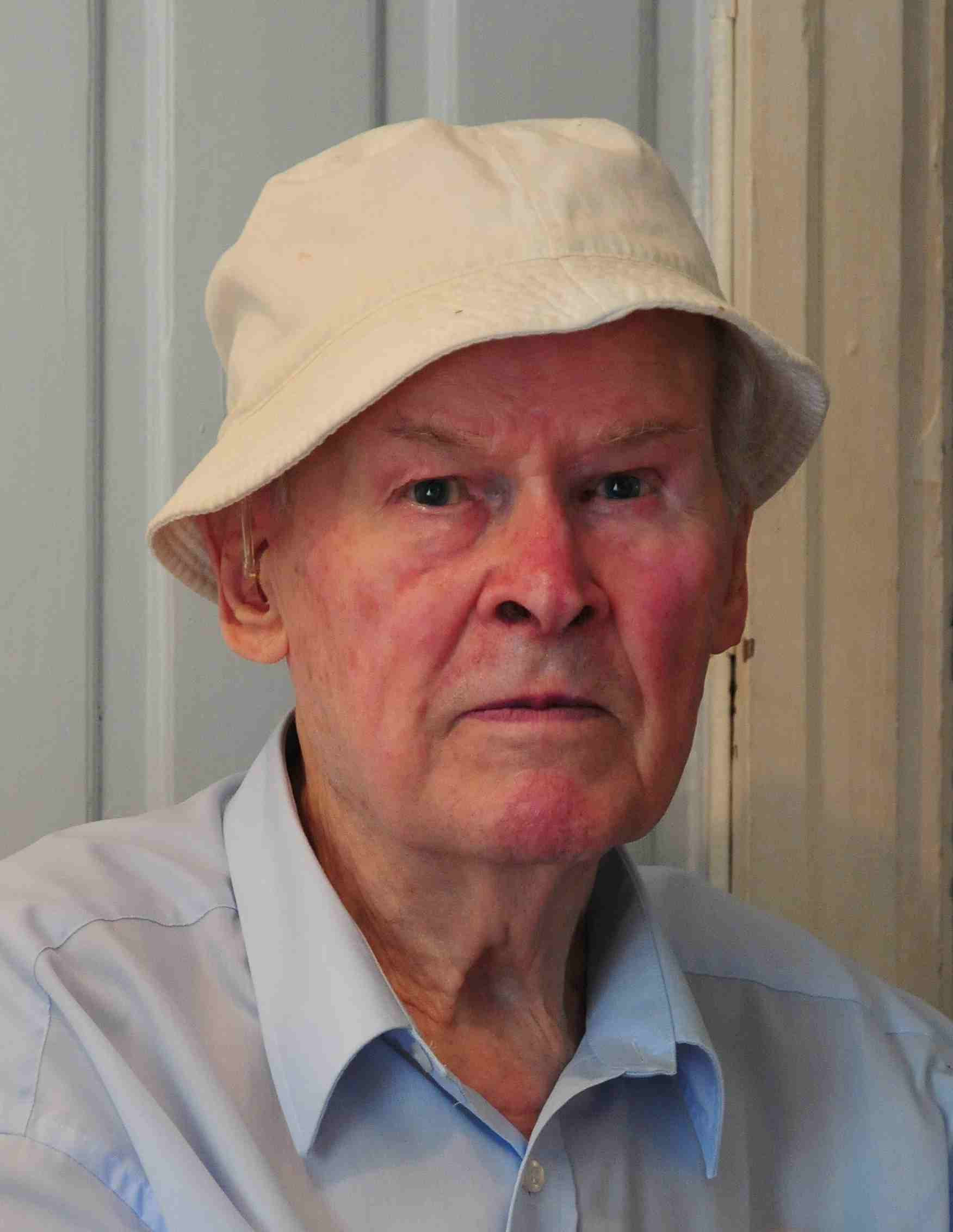
- Born: 26 November 1920; Paris, France
- Died: 16 September 2017 (aged 96); Oslo, Norway
- Occupation: Physicist
- Parent(s): Henrik Sørensen and Gudrun Klewe

Sven Oluf Sørensen (26 November 1920 – 16 September 2017) was a Norwegian physicist. He was born in Paris, as a son of painter Henrik Sørensen and Gudrun Cleve. Sørensen was appointed professor in nuclear physics at the University of Oslo. He has participated in several international research groups, in particular associated to CERN in Genéve. Also, he established Holmsbu billedgalleri and Vinje Biletgalleri in honour of his father, Henrik Sørensen.

== Career ==
S. O. Sørensen studied physics and mathematics at the University of Oslo and graduated in 1947. He completed his doctoral thesis and became Dr.philos in 1952. During the years 1948-61 he was research assistant at the University of Oslo and became professor of physics there from 1961 till he retired in 1987 becoming professor emeritus.

His scientific work was focused on the study of elementary particles and their reactions by means of photographic emulsions, bubble chamber pictures and electronic equipment. He has written several scientific papers on nuclear physics and elementary particle physics presenting new results of significance for our understanding of the atomic nuclei.

Around 1950 S. O. Sørensen introduced high energy nuclear physics at the University of Oslo. He had earlier stayed at a research institute in Bristol which at that time was World leading in this type of research.

Sørensen was one of the grounding fathers of a Nordic cooperation project on research of proton collisions that was performed by means of bubble chamber technique at CERN. This cooperation turned out to be of great significance for the evolution of elementary physics in the Scandinavian countries. Sørensen also performed research on antiprotons and on cosmic radiation.

S. O. Sørensen has also been author of several semipopular articles on many topics such as nuclear physics, cosmic radiation, dark matter and astronomical topics. He was known as an inspiring lecturer both at the university and when gave popular lectures. He also wrote a great biography about his father's life and art.

S. O. Sørensen was a member of the Norwegian Academy of Science and Letters since 1965 and the Royal Norwegian Society of Sciences and Letters since 1990. He was given the Buskerud County Municipality Award of Culture in 1978. He was decorated Knight, First Class of the Order of St. Olav in 1991.
