= The Dream of Peace =

Artwork by Henrik Sørensen in the United Nations Library

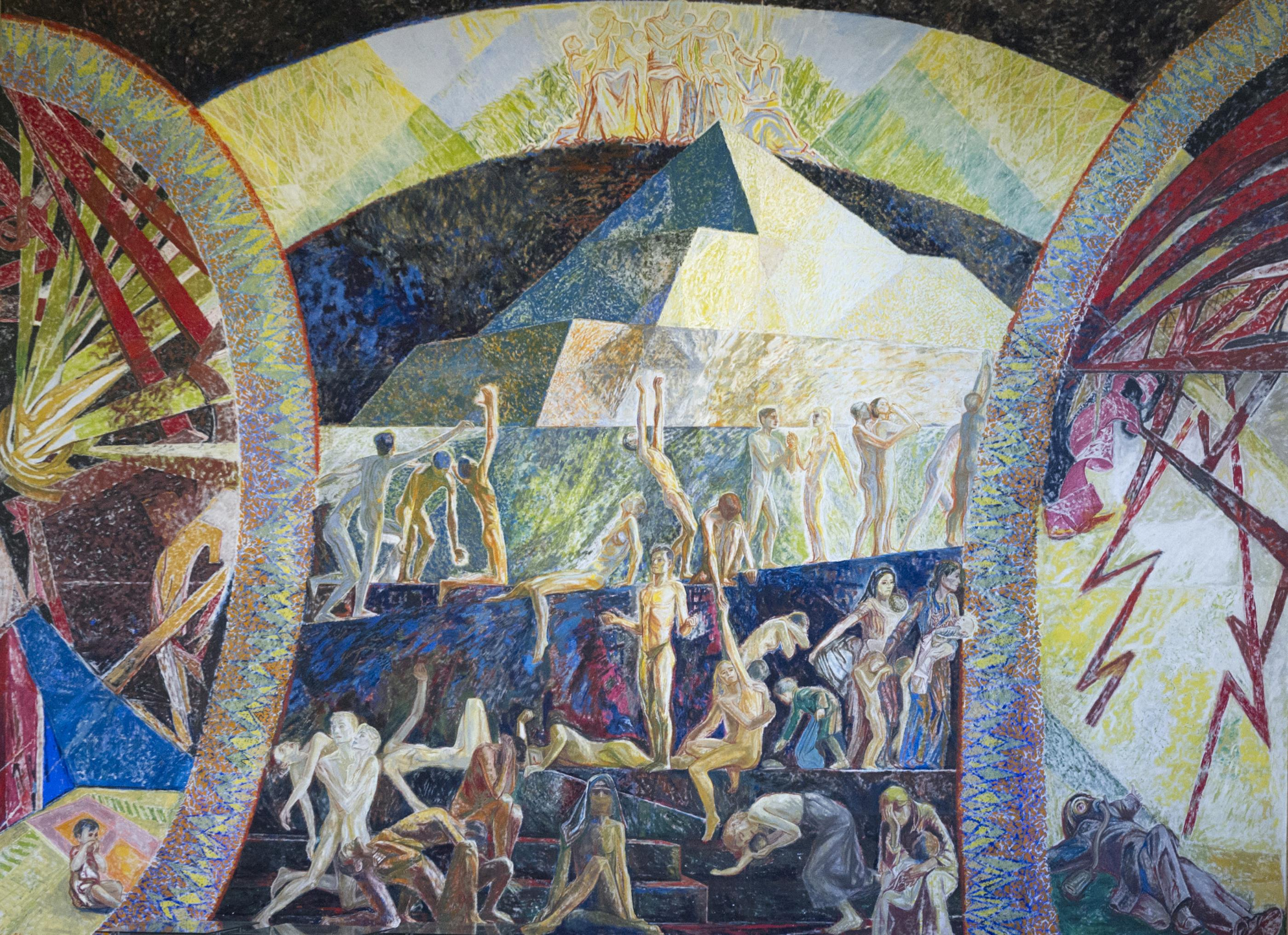
The Dream of Peace

The Dream of Peace is an 8.6 meters wide by 6.5 meters tall oil painting on canvas by Norwegian artist, Henrik Sørensen (b. 1882 – d. 1962), depicting themes of war, defeat, and hope for humanity. It is on permanent display, mounted on a wall (Marouflée) in the United Nations Library & Archives in Geneva at the Palais des Nations.

== History ==
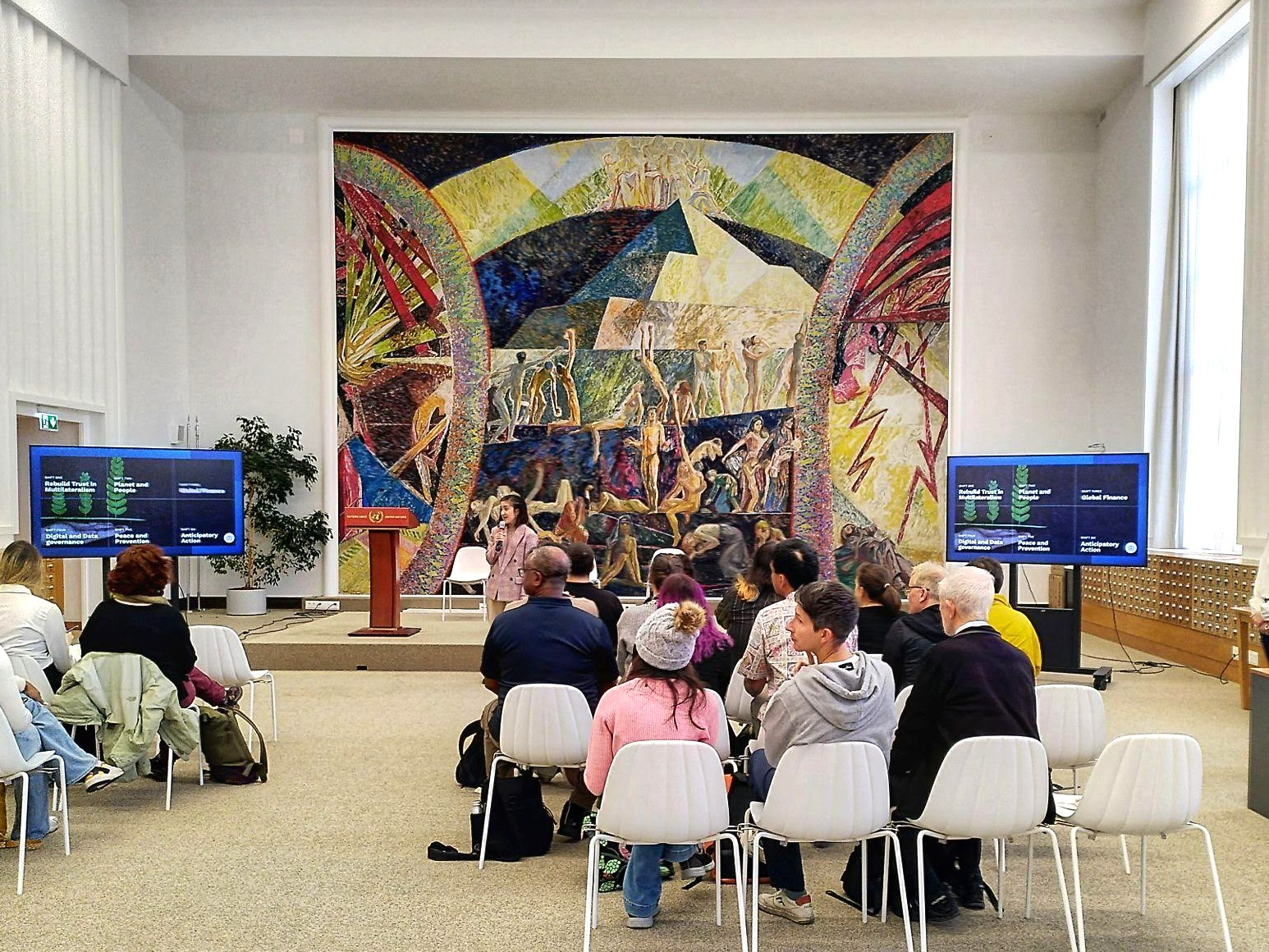
The painting, as staff and visitors see it today

Commissioned in 1937 by the Norwegian government, it was over two years in production. Several other painters contributed to the painting: the constructivist Georg Jacobsen, extraordinary professor in the period of 1936-40 at the Academy of Fine Arts in Oslo, designed the pyramid and Cathrine Riddervold, a student of Sørensen, acted as an assistant: painting, notably the two large ornamental arches separating the pyramid from the two side panels.

Halvdan Koht, at the time Norway’s Minister of Foreign Affairs, personally commissioned the art together with Carl J. Hambro, then President of the Parliament. The painting was shortly displayed at the House of Artists in Oslo in November 1939, and then rolled up and brought by train to Geneva. There it was mounted in the Palais des Nations to adorn the Large study room of the League of Nations Library (today the event room of the UN Library & Archives Geneva), a place of calm and contemplation. Its inaugurationed took place in December 1939 in the presence of Carl J. Hambro, then-President of the League of Nations Assembly, reinforcing the highly symbolic gesture of this donation.

== Composition ==
The initial sketch of The Dream of Peace was quite different from the final painting. It depicted a rising sun and a frieze featuring portraits of the founding fathers of the League of Nations idea.

Color plays a crucial role in this painting. The artist emphasized his message using blue and green tones, colors of hope, and lighter hues of the sun to guide the dream of humanity. The characters lack physical power and majesty. On the contrary, they are slender and uniform. The iconographic ensemble recalls the triangular compositions of the Last Judgment, where paradise and hell are separated, one depicted on the left and the other on the right. The golden frame of the painting is meant to represent a halo.
