= Holmsbu =

Village in Asker, Norway

Coordinates: 59°34′N 10°26′E

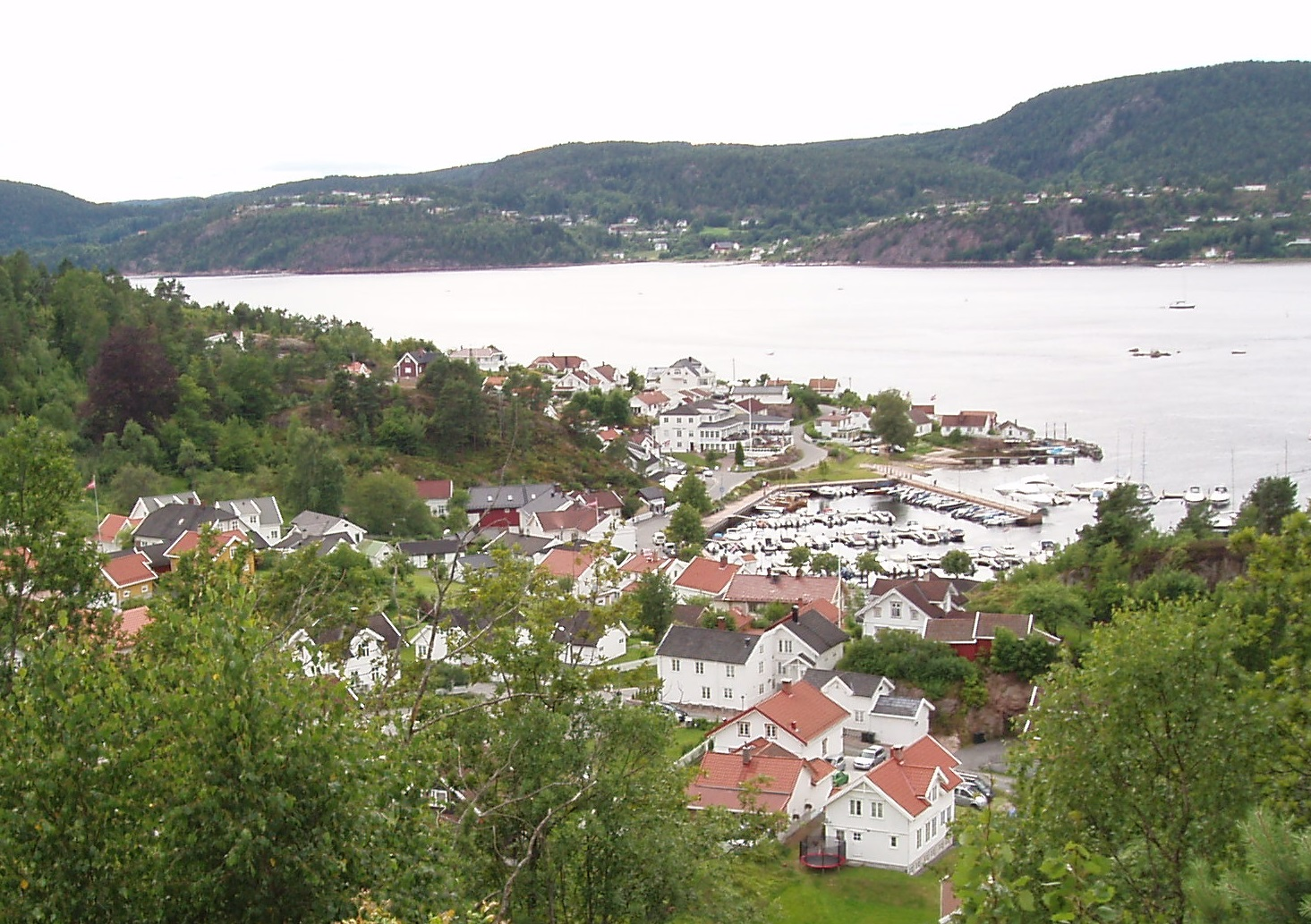
Holmsbu seen from Stratos

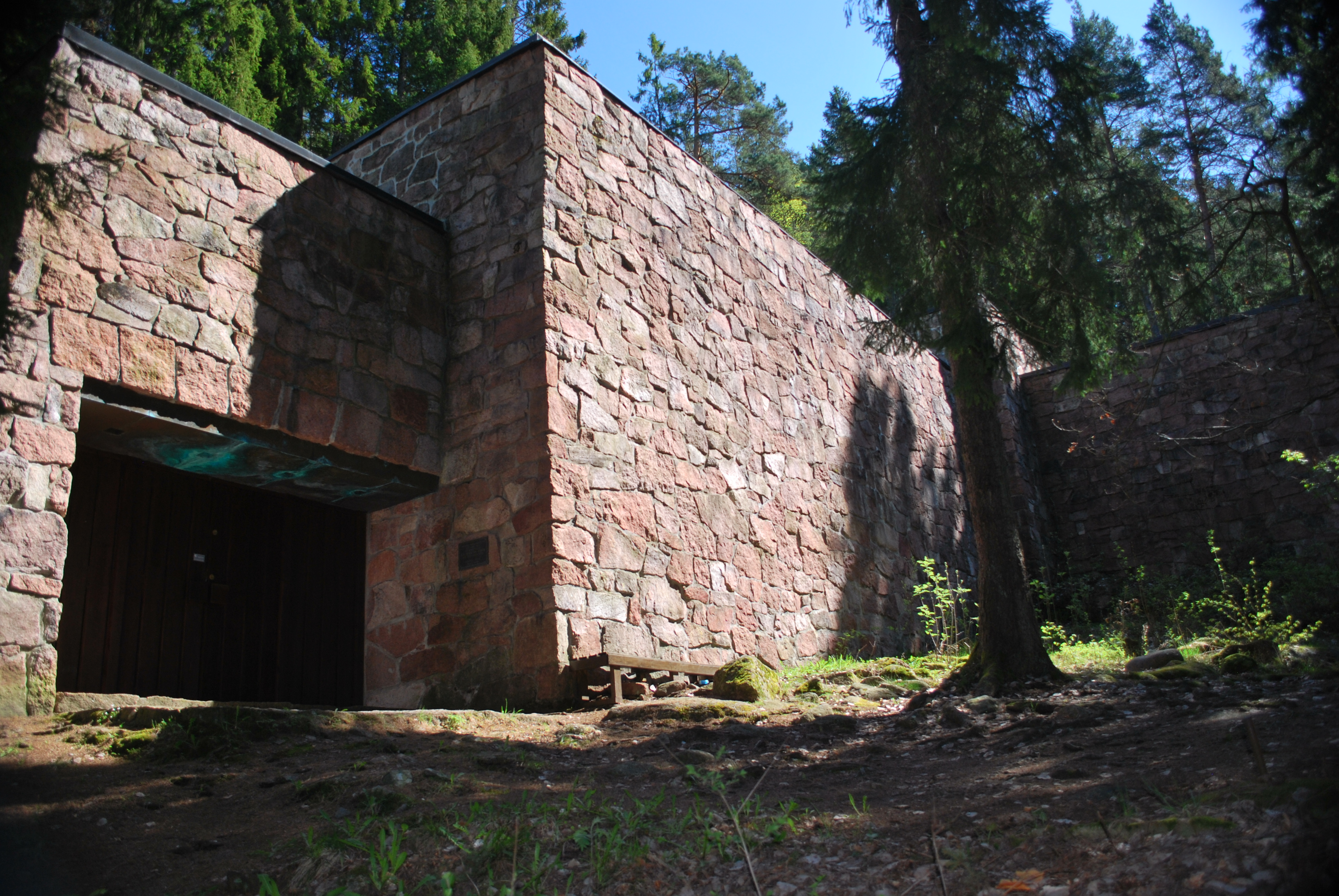
Holmsbu Art Gallery

Holmsbu is a small village located in Akershus, Norway.

Holmsbu is situated in the municipality of Asker on the west side of the peninsula of Hurumlandet on Drammensfjord. The village had 309 residents as of 1 January 2014. The seaport village was granted city status (ladested) in 1847 and lost its status in 1964.

Old wooden buildings along the waterfront are largely preserved. The village has attracted both artists and tourists. Holmsbu Bad is a hotel dating back to 1880. The hotel is situated overlooking Holmsbu harbor and Drammensfjorden.

Holmsbu Art Gallery (Holmsbu Billedgalleri) was designed and constructed during the period 1963 to 1973. The art gallery focuses on the art work of Holmsbu Painters Oluf Wold-Torne (1867–1919), Thorvald Erichsen (1868–1939) and Henrik Sørensen. Holmsbu Art Gallery, which received the Houen Foundation Award, was designed by Norwegian architect Bjart Mohr and was opened in 1973.

Holmsbu Church (Holmsbu Kirke) is constructed of wood and was built in 1887. The church has long plan and 300 seats. Holmsbu chapel (Holmsbu kapell) was inaugurated on March 23, 1887. The chapel is located in the hilly landscape on the outskirts of the village of Holmsbu ca. 500 m east of Drammensfjorden and ca. 7 km south of the main church.

== Gallery ==
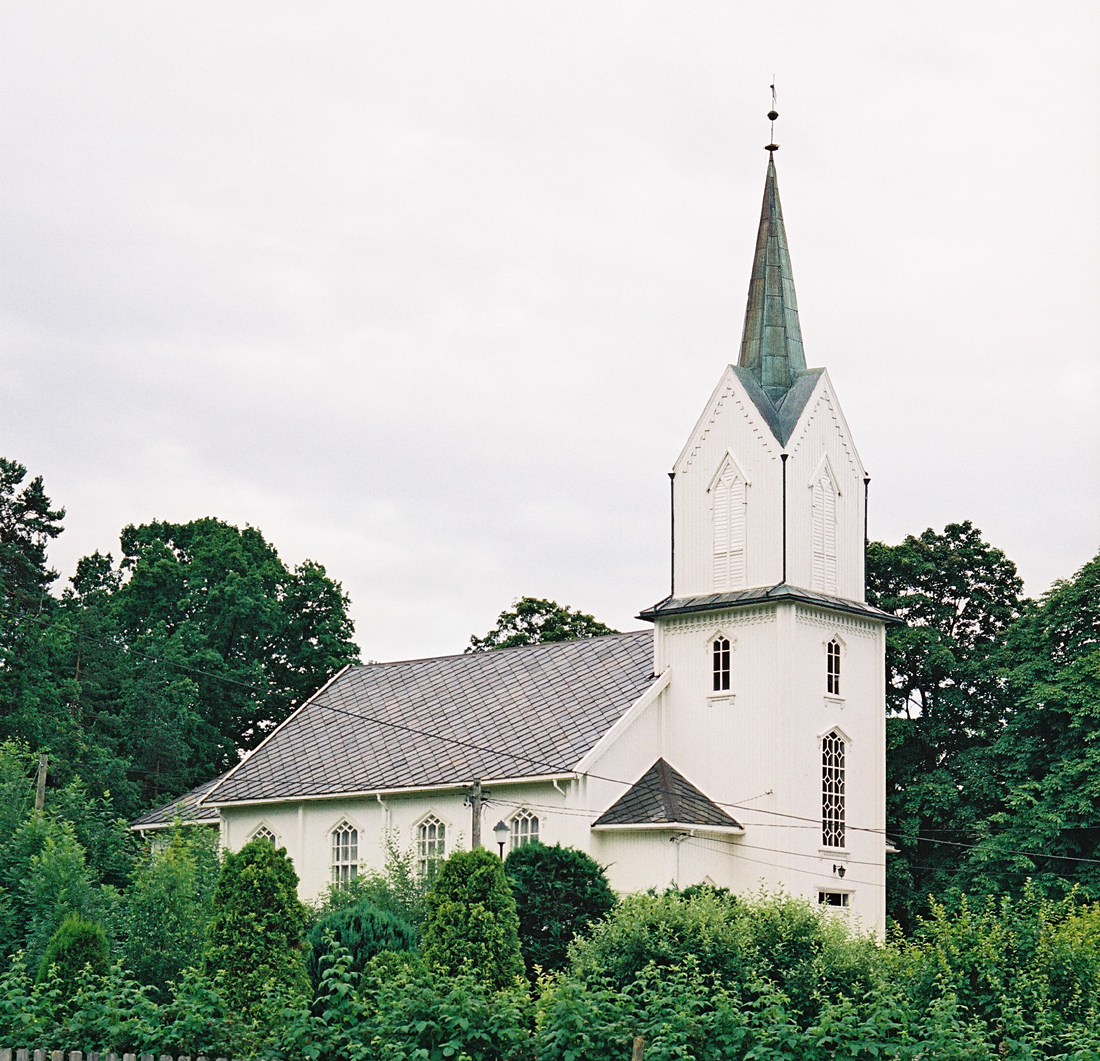
Holmsbu Church

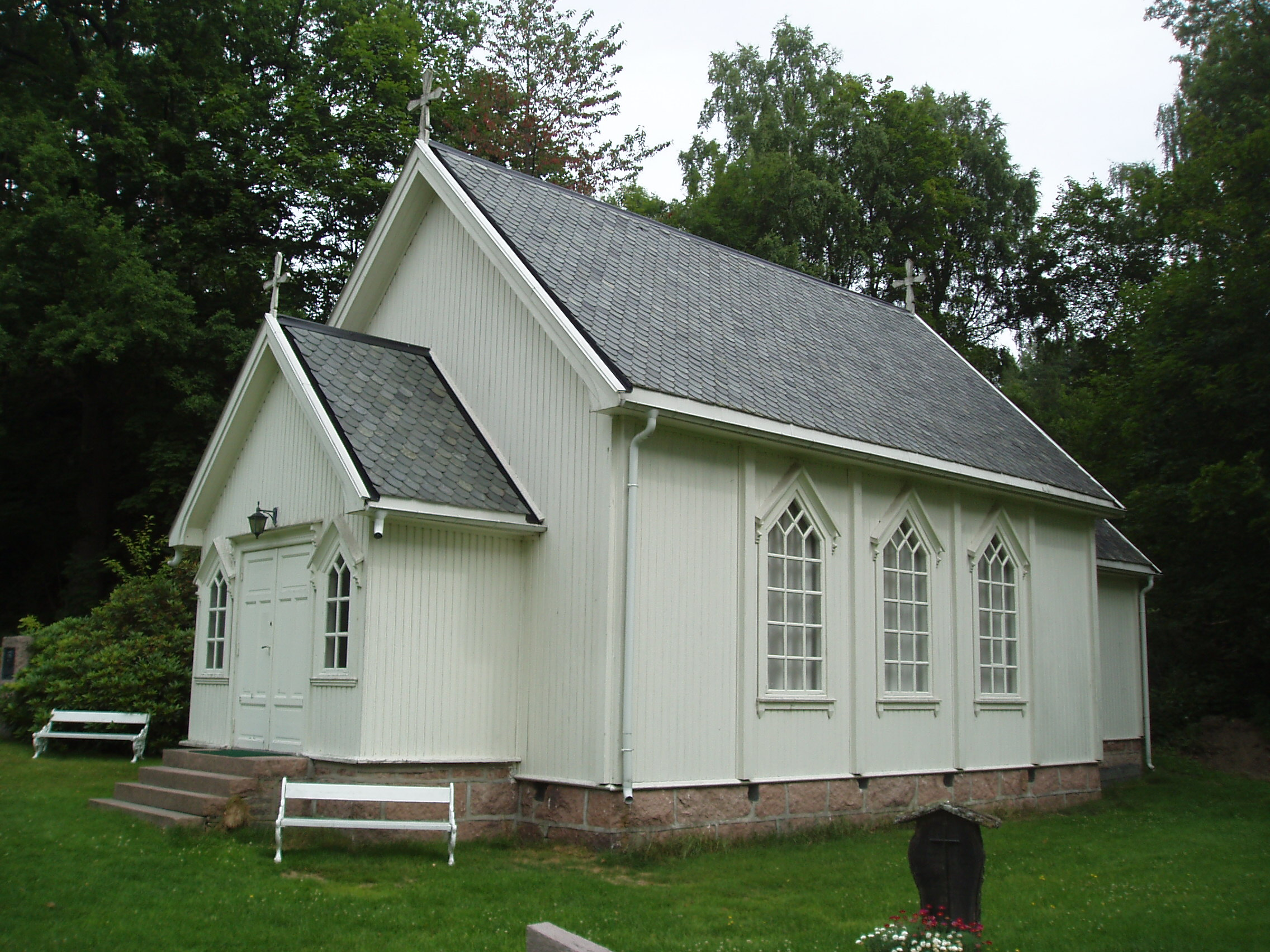
Holmsbu Chapel

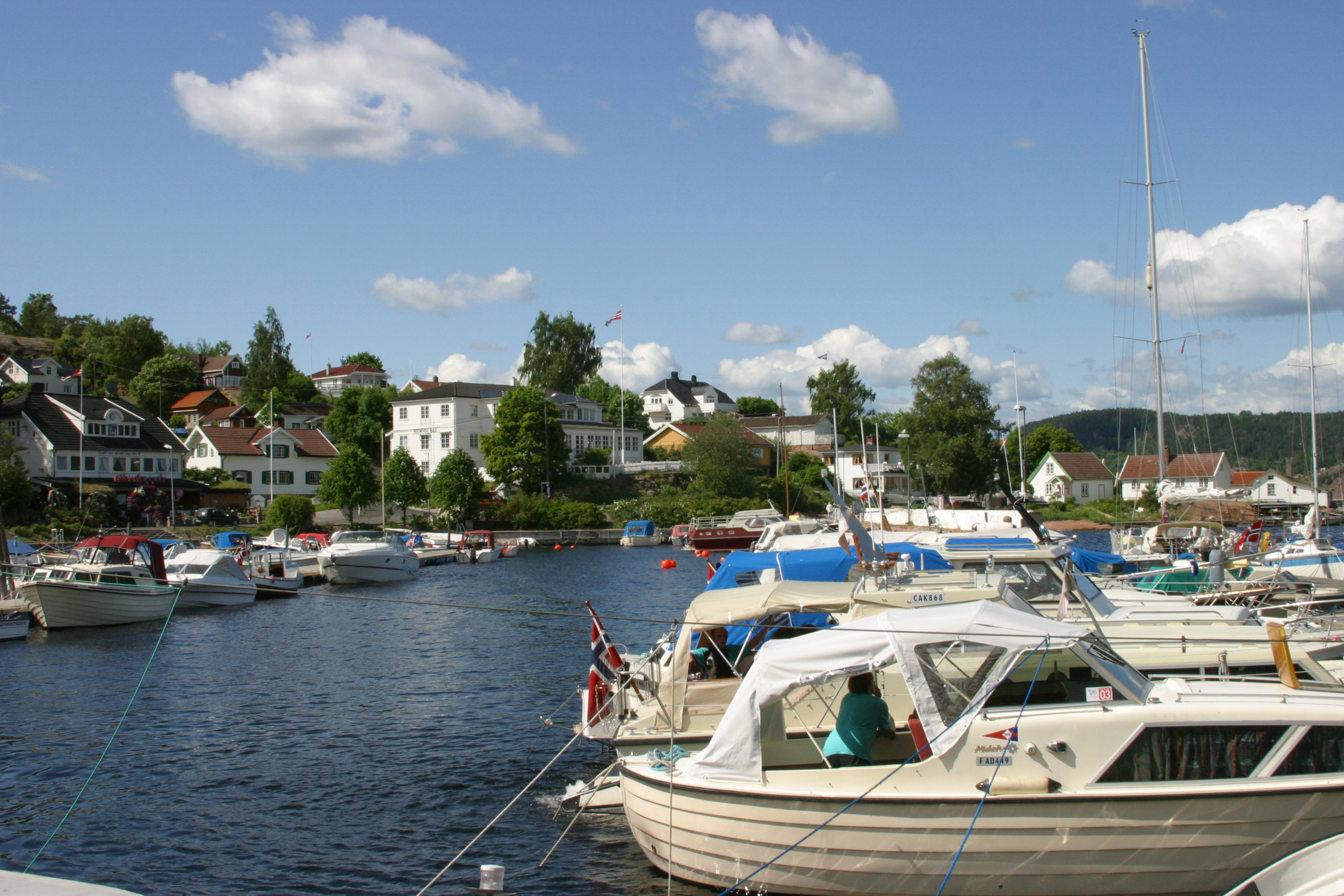
Holmsbu Harbour

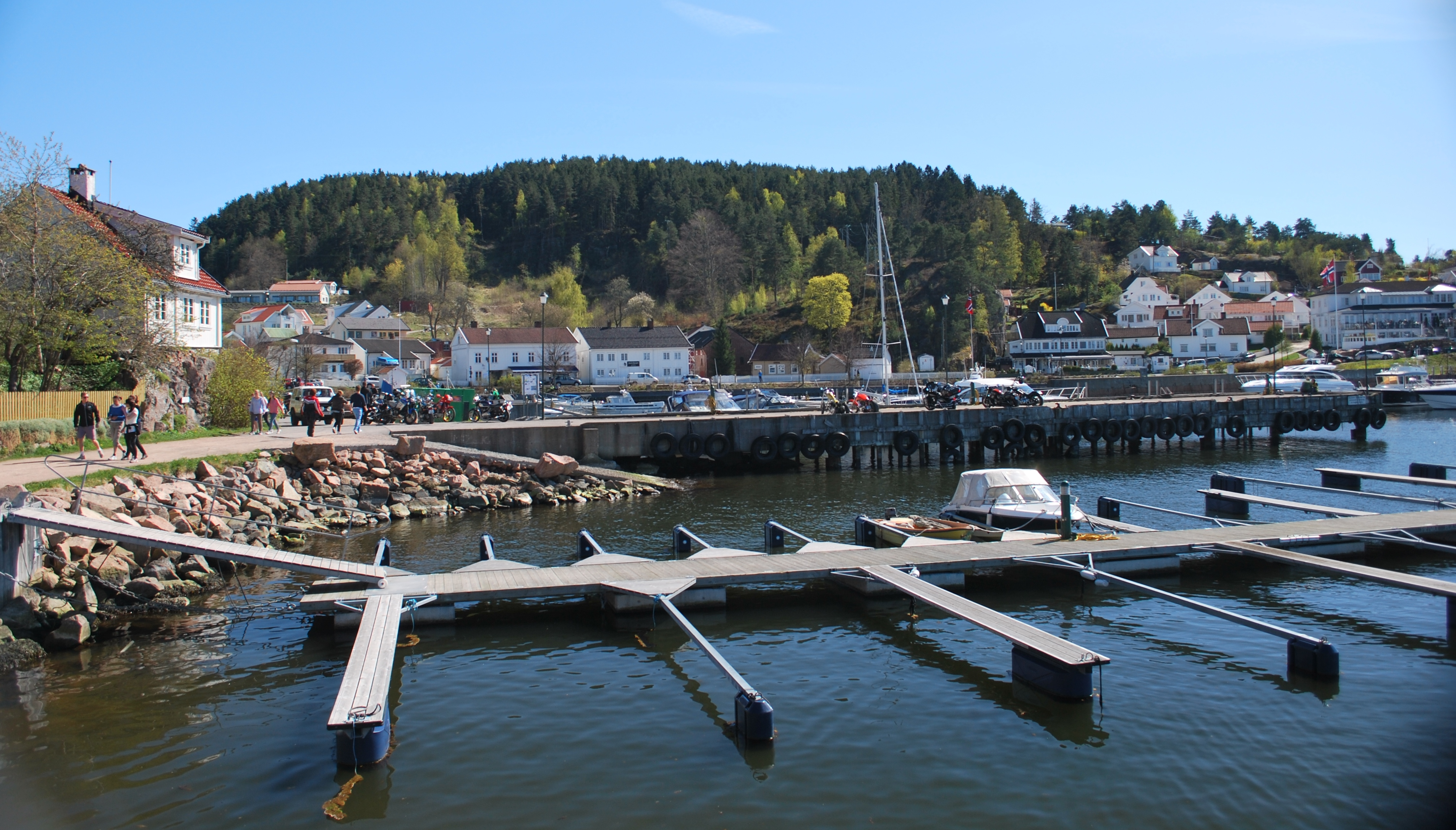
Holmsbu Marina

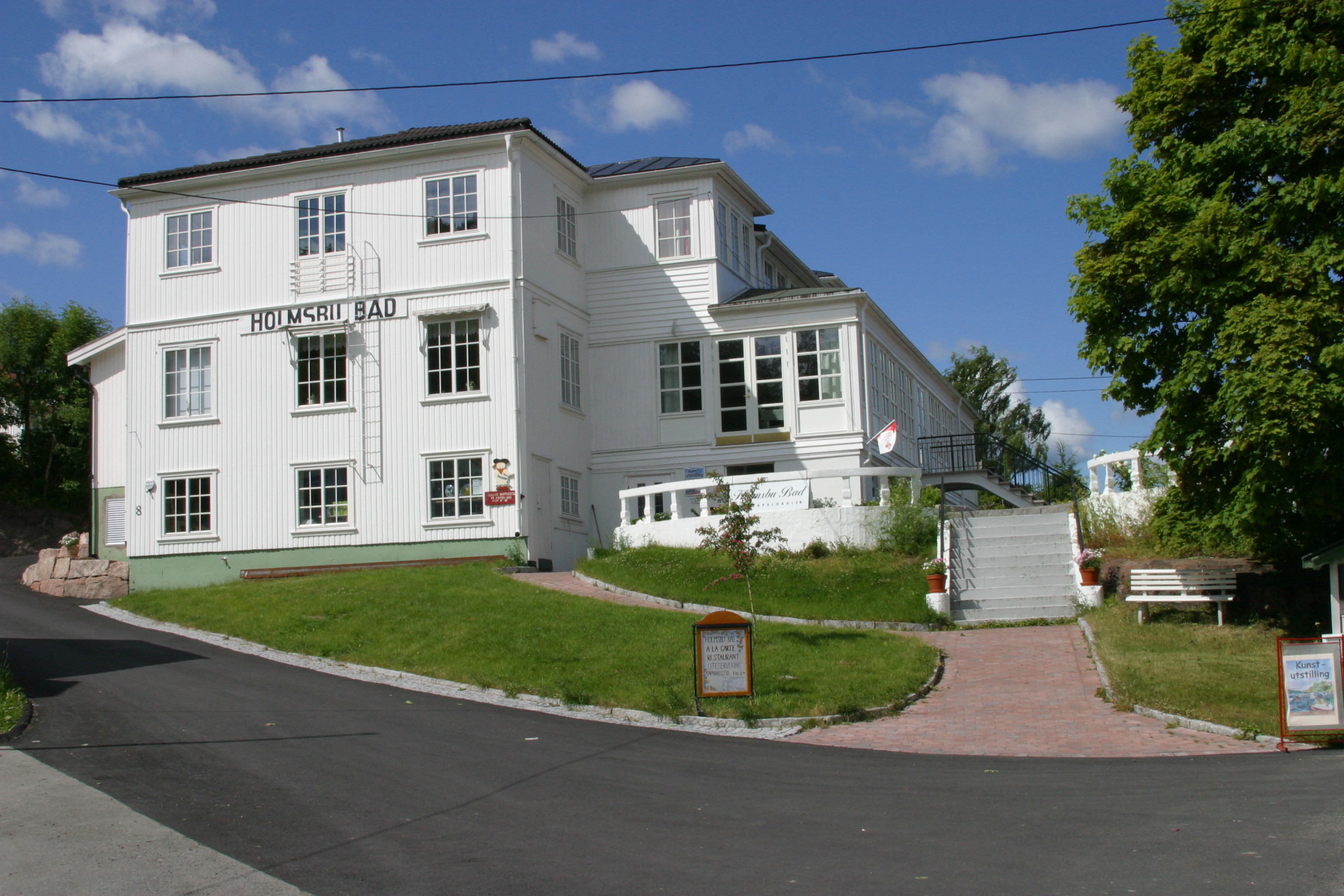
Holmsbu Bad

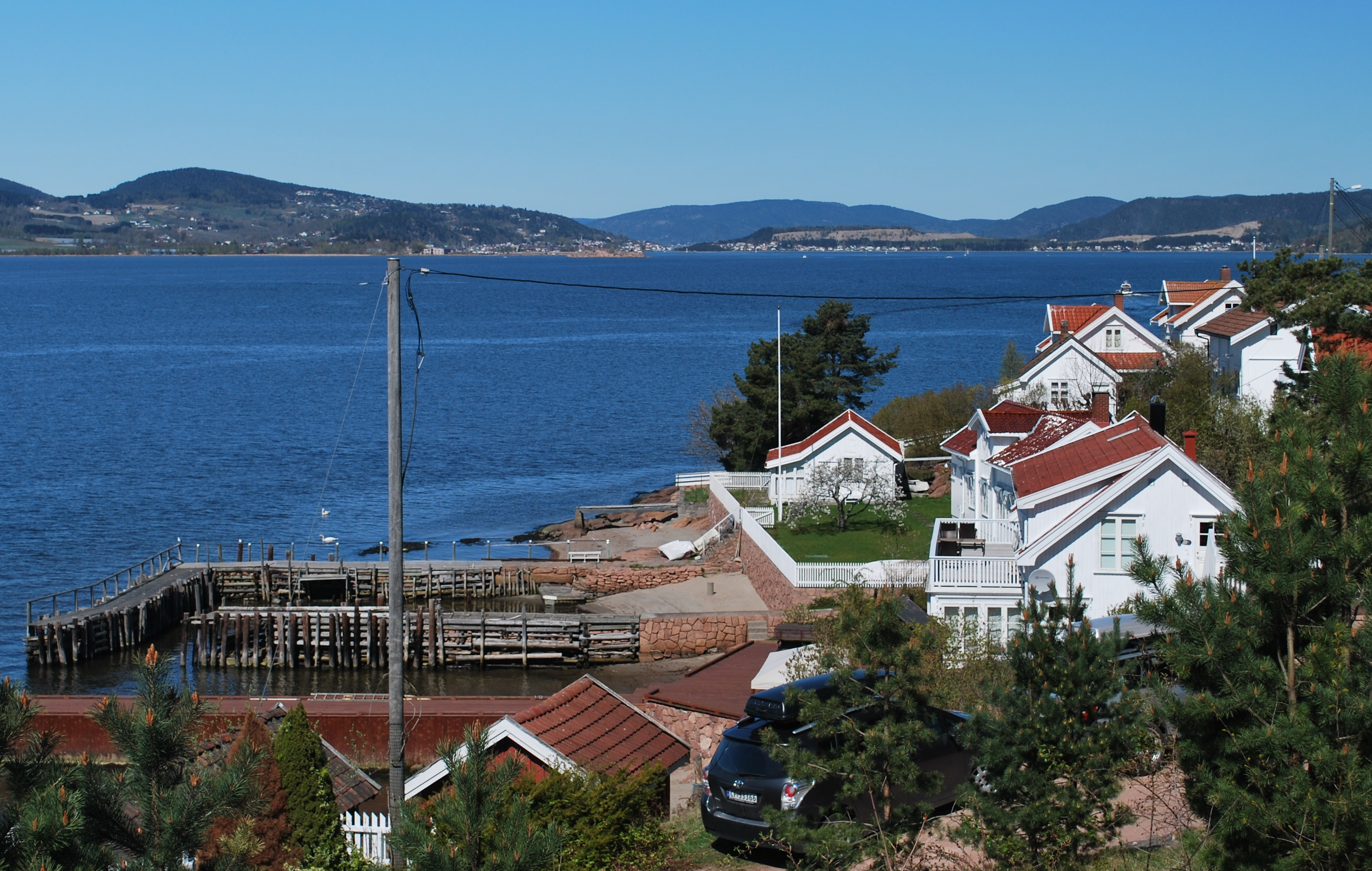
Holmsbu looking toward Verket and Svelvik

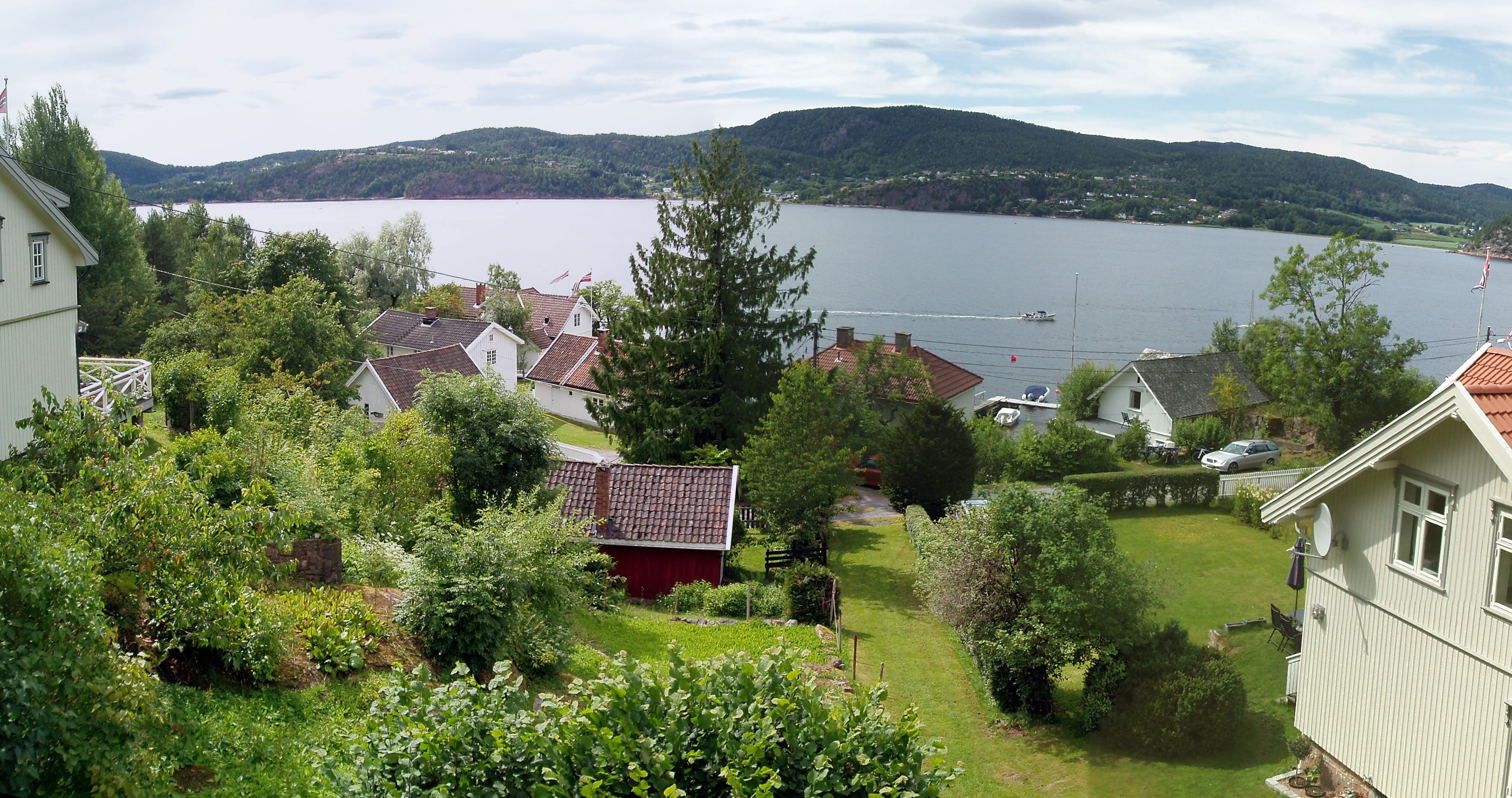
Støa in Holmsbu, centre of the Holmsbu painters

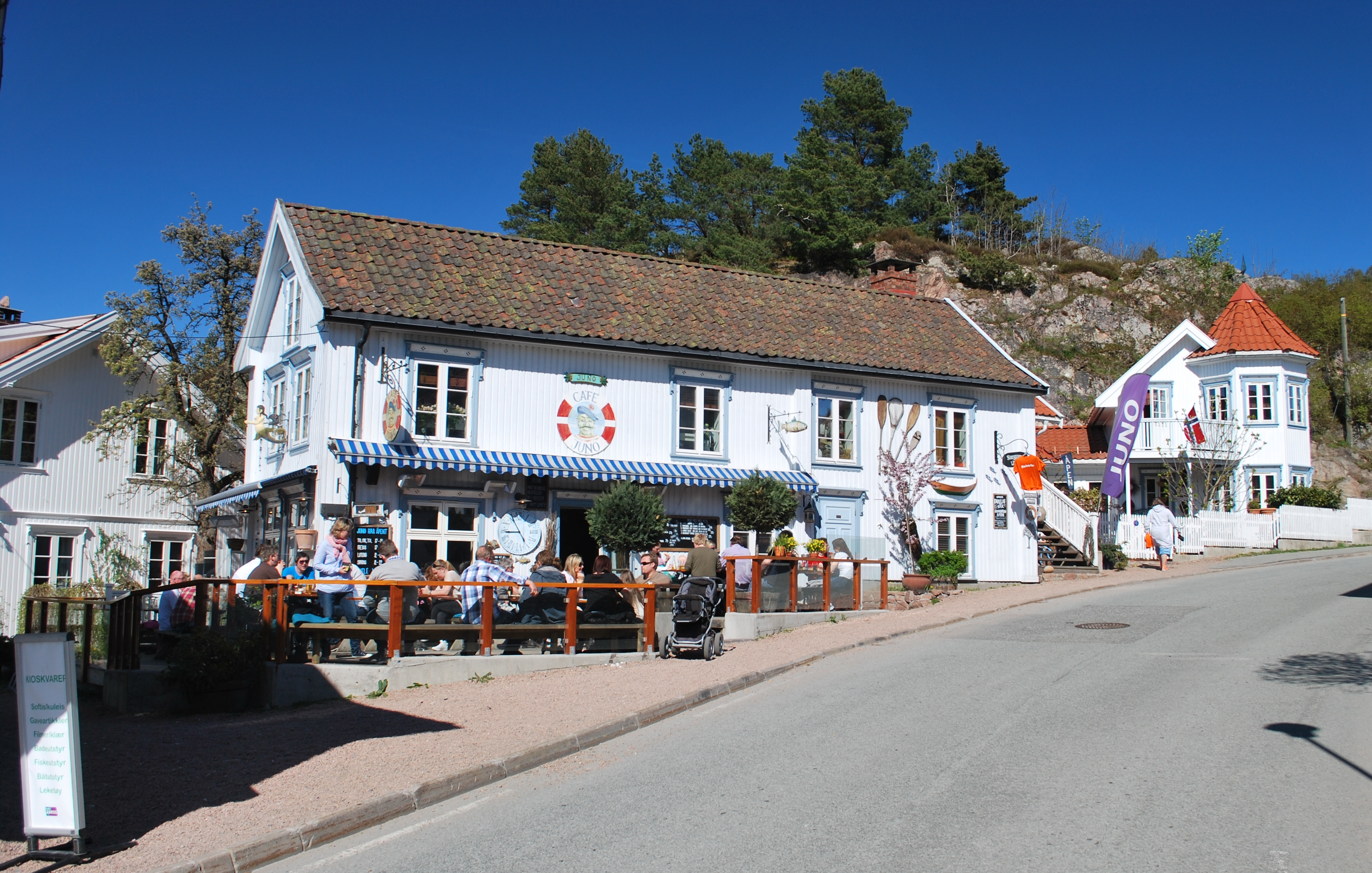
Cafe Juno

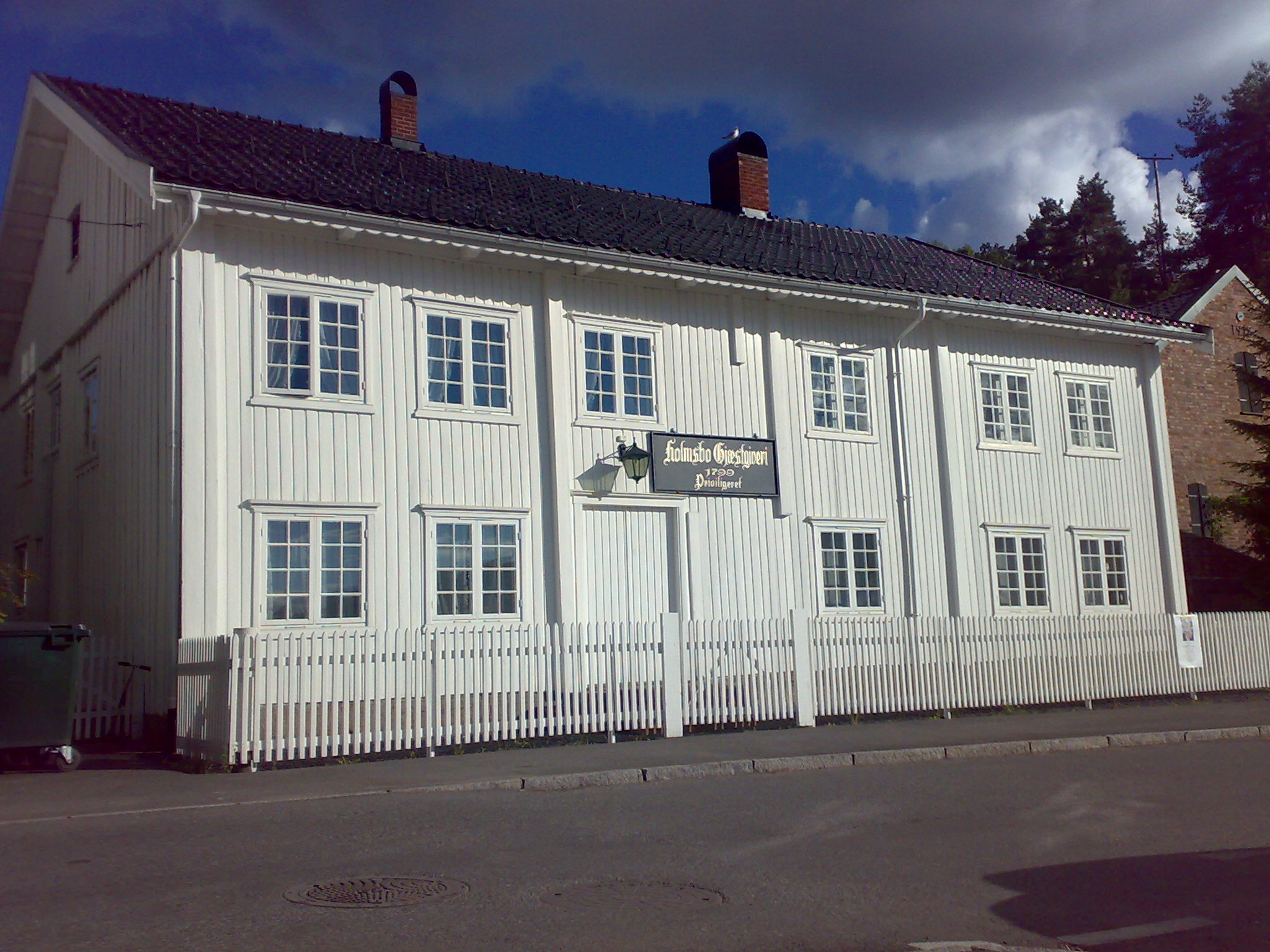
Holmsbu guesthouse
