= Halfdan Cleve =

Norwegian composer (1879–1951)

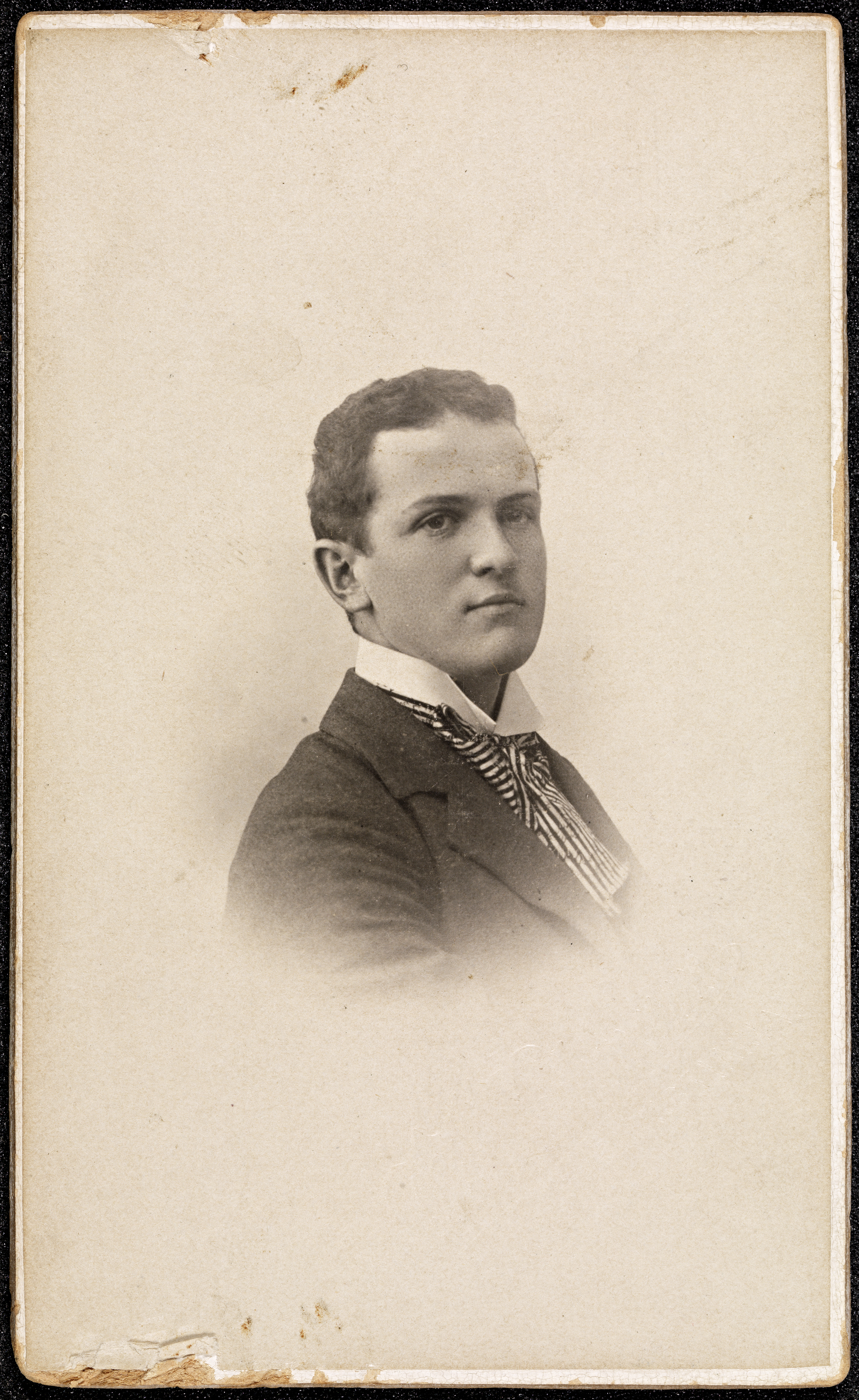
Portrait of Halfdan Cleve by Carl Christian Wischmann, c. 1898

Halfdan Cleve born Halfdan Klewe (5 October 1879 – 6 April 1951) was a Norwegian composer, and father of the singer and composer Cissi Cleve.

== Biography ==
Cleve was born and raised in Kongsberg, Norway. He lived some time in Germany. Some examples of his output as a composer are piano concertos, other piano works, and some chamber music. He was described as a child prodigy. He married pianist Berit Winderen (10 February 1878 – 23 September 1964) and they had four children. Berit changed her name to Berit Windern Cleve after marrying Halvdan. Their four children was Cissy Cleve, Signy Cleve, Dagny Cleve, and Astri Cleve. In an interview with Aftenposten on March 19, 1957, Berit Cleve stated that all four daughters were performing musicians. Cissi Cleve was an opera singer. Signy Cleve was a pianist, Dagny Cleve a violinist, and Astri Cleve was a singer who also danced ballet.

Throughout his early childhood he was tutored with a firm hand by his father, the organist Andreas Johan Julius Klewe (1832–1903). A child prodigy, he made his first appearances on the concert stage at the age of five. The strictness of his training is exemplified by the fact that he was not allowed to play anything other than the works of Johann Sebastian Bach until he was sixteen. For the next three years his musical training was undertaken by Otto Winter-Hjelm, after which he studied in Berlin under Oscar Raif and the brothers Xaver and Philipp Scharwenka. In 1902, Cleve debuted his First Piano Concerto in Berlin. That same year, he married Berit Winderen, a student of Teresa Carreño, and made numerous concert appearances together, both in Norway and abroad. Cleve composed five piano concertos, a violin sonata, a piano quintet, songs with orchestral accompaniment and over one hundred piano pieces. In the last period of his life (1926–50), he worked as a piano teacher at Music Conservatory in Oslo and died 1951 in Oslo.

== Works ==
- 1900: 7 Klaverstykker, op. 1
- 1901: Klaverkonsert nr. 1, op. 3
- 1904: Klaverkonsert nr. 2, op. 6
- 1907: Klaverkonsert nr. 3, op. 9
- 1908: Four songs with orchestra to palms by Olaf Schou, op. 11
- 1912: Klaverkonsert nr. 4, op. 12
- 1915: Klaverkonsert nr. 5, op. 20
- 1931: Sonata for violin and piano, op. 21 (op. 33–36 is not released)

== Discography ==
- 1980: Halfdan Cleve, Einar Steen-Nøkleberg, New Symphony Orchestra of London, Roy Wales - Klaverkonsert Nr. 4 A-Moll / Klaversonate D-Moll - Etyde Fiss-Dur - Vårbølger Dess-Dur (Norsk Kulturråds Klassikerserie)
- 1992: Halfdan Cleve, Geir Henning Braaten - Piano Works (Norsk Kulturråds Klassikerserie)
- 2018: Ballade Tragica, Halfdan Cleve Chamber Works (SIMAX)
