= Cissi Cleve =

Norwegian Music Artist

Cissi Cleve, born Cecilie Schou Cleve (17 December 1911 – 27 December 1993), was an operatic singer and composer, and the daughter of the composer Halfdan Cleve.

== Biography ==
Cleve danced ballet for 14 years, and studied under Per Aabel and Lowe Krohn. She performed in a show with Sonja Henie at Centralteatret, as well as at the National Theatre (Oslo) for the royal family. At the age of 21 she won the Ruud-scholarship for 4 years in a row, and studied singing in Vienna. Later she was engaged for six weeks at the Cairo Opera House as part of the Vienna State Opera.

Cleve was awarded the Leharmedaljen by Franz Lehár personally. She was engaged for three years by the Nuremberg Opera, until the outbreak of the Second World War. She was a member of Tono from the age of 19, and as a composer produced 15 piano pieces and 2 pieces for the Janitsjar Orchestra, as well as 14 other pieces for orchestra. Her music has been played on NRK Radio by Kringkastingsorkesteret on several occasions. Cleve received a Ruudstipendium for singers over a period of four years, won a grant from the artists' compensation fund four times, and two scholarships from Tono.
