= Bull (disambiguation) =

Bull usually refers to an uncastrated adult male bovine.

Bull may also refer to:

== Common meanings ==
- The adult male of many other species—see List of animal names
- Papal bull, a decree issued by the Pope
- "Bull", euphemistic shortening of the expletive "bullshit"

== Arts and entertainment ==
- The Young Bull or The Bull, a 1647 painting by Paulus Potter
- Bull (1965 film), a Bulgarian film
- Bull (2019 film), an American film
- Bull (2021 film), a British crime film
- Bull Hurley, a character in Over the Top (1987)
- Bull (2000 TV series), a short-lived drama series on the TNT Network
- Bull (2015 TV series), a British comedy series on Gold
- Bull (2016 TV series), an American drama series on CBS
- "Bull" (CSI), a 2008 episode of television series CSI: Crime Scene Investigation
- Bull Shannon, bailiff in the Night Court TV sitcom
- Bull, a 2013 play by Mike Bartlett
- Bull, a dog in Japanese comic Lassie
- Bald Bull, an opponent in the video game Punch-Out!! Series
- Bull (album), a 1992 album by Canadian rock band Bootsauce
- Bull (band), an English indie rock band from York
- "Bulls", a 2016 song by Australian band the Cat Empire from Rising with the Sun
- Bull (sculpture), a sculpture by Robert Clatworthy
- "The Bull", a short story by Saki
- The Bull of Navan or The Bull, a sculpture in Navan, Ireland
- An alternative name for the music venue The Bull's Head, Barnes, south-west London
- "The Bull", a song from the album Slowheart by Kip Moore
- "The Bull", a song from the album Good Blood Headbanguers by Massacration

=== Film ===
- The Bull (1994 film), a film by Carlo Mazzacurati
- The Bull (2019 film), a film by Boris Akopov
- The Bull, a character in the 2009 film Where the Wild Things Are

=== Radio ===
- The pub in the long-running BBC radio series The Archers
- KOMG, a country music radio station in Willard, Missouri
- KSD (FM), a country music radio station in St. Louis, Missouri
- KZSN, a country music radio station in Hutchinson, Kansas
- WBUL-FM, a country music radio station in Lexington, Kentucky

== Military ==
- USS Bull, two U.S. Navy ships
- Bull, NATO reporting name of the Tupolev Tu-4, a Soviet bomber aircraft
- Bull (armored personnel carrier)

== Names ==
- Bull (nickname), including list of persons with the nickname or stage name
- Bull (surname), including list of persons with the surname
- Bull., standard author abbreviation of Jean Baptiste François Pierre Bulliard (c. 1742–1793), French physician and botanist
- Carmine Agnello (born 1960), American mobster
- Sammy Gravano (born 1945), American mobster and government informant
- Terry Jenkins (born 1963), English professional darts player
- Andy "The Bull" McSharry, Irish farmer known for his disputes with hillwalkers
- "Johnny the Bull", a ring name of American professional wrestler Jon Hugger

== Places ==
- Bull River (disambiguation)
- Bull Arm, Newfoundland, Canada, an arm or bay
- Bull Hill, a mountain in Putnam County, New York
- Bull Island, Dublin Bay, Ireland
- Bull Point, Falkland Islands
- Bull Point Lighthouse, Devon, UK
- Fort Bull, a fort in British North America during the French and Indian War
- The Bull, Dorset, a rock out to sea near Durdle Door on the Jurassic Coast, England
- The Bull at Pinehurst Farms, a Jack Nicklaus-designed golf course located in Sheboygan Falls, Wisconsin, US

=== Pubs ===
- The Bull at Sonning, Berkshire, England
- The Bull, St Paul's Cray, south-east London
- The Bull Hotel, Cambridge, Cambridgeshire, England
- The Bull Hotel, Llangefni, Anglesey, Wales
- The Bull Hotel, Ludlow, Shropshire, England
- The Bull Hotel, Peterborough, Cambridgeshire
- The Bull Hotel, Sedbergh, North Yorkshire, England

== Other uses ==
- Groupe Bull, a French computer company
- Bull (stock market speculator)
- Bull baronets, an extant title in the Baronetage of the United Kingdom
- Bullet (typography), the &bull; HTML entity
- Bull boat, a boat made by Native Americans and frontiersmen from the hide of a bull
- Red Bull, an energy drink brand
- Taurus (constellation)

== See also ==
- Bull Canyon (disambiguation)
- Bulla (disambiguation)
- Bulle (disambiguation)
- Bulls (disambiguation)
- The Bull (disambiguation)
