= Begonia melanobullata =

Scientific classification
- Kingdom: Plantae
- Clade: Tracheophytes
- Clade: Angiosperms
- Clade: Eudicots
- Clade: Rosids
- Order: Cucurbitales
- Family: Begoniaceae
- Genus: Begonia
- Species: B. melanobullata

Binomial name
- Begonia melanobullata C.I Peng & C.W.Lin

Species of flowering plant

Begonia melanobullata, the Vietnamese black peak begonia or Vietnam ferox, is a species of flowering plant in the family Begoniaceae, native to Vietnam. It was first documented in limestone karst areas across the Sino-Vietnamese border.

Begonia melanobullata is noteworthy for having hair-tipped, dark-colored conical bullae across the upper leaf surface. It has red flower stalks, and red-streaked, green tinted flowers and seed capsules. It is very similar to Begonia ferox and Begonia nahangensis but differs in size and leaf shape.

Comparison of Begonia melanobullata with B. ferox and B. nahangensis
		B. melanobullata	B. ferox	B. nahangensis
Stipule	Length	1.4–2.5 cm	1–1.7 cm	0.4–0.6 cm
Leaf	Apex	Acuminate	Acuminate	Obtuse to nearly rounded
Leaf	Shape	Widely ovate to widely elliptic	Ovate	Broadly oblique-ovate or oblique-reniform
Leaf	Conical bullae on upper surface	Present on all leaves; erect hairs tipping bullae persistent	Progressively developed on leaves as the plant matures; hairs on bullae soon deciduous	Unknown
Inflorescence	Peduncle length (cm)	15–38	5–13	(8–) 10–12 (−14)
Male flower	Tepal color	Greenish	Pale pinkish-yellow	White to light pink
Male flower	Tepal size (mm)	Outer 6–9 × 7–9, inner 5–7 × 3–4	Outer 9–11 × 6–11, inner 7–11 × 4	Outer 8–9 in diam., inner 8–9 × 2.5–3.5
Male flower	Anther length (mm)	0.5–0.8	Ca. 1	Ca. 0.5
Female flower	Tepal color	Yellowish-pinkish	Pinkish-white	Light olive-green
Female flower	Tepal size (mm)	Outer 7–8 × 7–8, inner 4–6 × 2–3	Outer 8–11 × 7–11 mm, inner 8–9 × 3–4	Outer (4.5) 5–6 (7) × (8) 9–11 (12) mm, inner 5–6 × 3–3.
Capsule	Size	1.2–1.9 cm long; abaxial wing crescent-shaped, 0.5–0.7 cm wide	1–1.5 cm long; abaxial wing crescent-shaped, 0.6–0.9 cm wide	0.8–1 cm long; abaxial wing oblique-triangular, 0.4 cm wide
Distribution		Northern Vietnam	Guangxi, China	Northern Vietnam

== Other references ==
- DeLano, Donald (January–February 2026). "Glass Containers" (PDF). The Begonian. 93: 7. ISSN 0096-8684.
