= Curwin Bosch =

South African rugby union player

- Full name: Curwin Dominique Bosch
- Born: 25 June 1997 (age 29) Port Elizabeth, Eastern Cape, South Africa
- Height: 1.81 m (5 ft 11 1/2 in)
- Weight: 83 kg (13 st 1 lb; 183 lb)
- School: Grey High School
- University: University of KwaZulu-Natal

Rugby union career
- Position: Fly-half / Fullback
- Current team: Bulls
Youth career
- 2010–2015: Eastern Province Kings
- 2016: Sharks
Amateur team(s)
Years	Team	Apps	(Points)
2016	UKZN Impi	4	(25)
Senior career
Years	Team	Apps	(Points)
2016	Sharks XV	2	(14)
2016–2023	Sharks (Currie Cup)	45	(448)
2016–2023	Sharks	115	(872)
2018	→ Munakata Sanix Blues	6	(95)
2024–2026	CA Brive	39	(267)
2026–	Bulls	0	(0)
- Correct as of 16 August 2026
International career
Years	Team	Apps	(Points)
2014–2015	South Africa Schools	6	(57)
2016–2017	South Africa Under-20	9	(104)
2017–2018	South Africa	2	(0)
- Correct as of 3 June 2018
Medal record
Boy's rugby sevens
Representing South Africa
Commonwealth Youth Games
Gold medal – first place	2015 Apia	Team competition

Curwin Dominique Bosch (born 25 June 1997) is a South African professional rugby union player, currently signed to the Bulls. He can play as a fly-half or a fullback.

== Career ==
=== 2010–15: Schoolboys ===
Bosch was born in Port Elizabeth and attended Grey High School. His first-team debut was at the age of 16 against Paul Roos Gymnasium.

Bosch was selected on several occasions to represent Eastern Province at youth rugby tournaments. His first being in 2010, when he played at the Under-13 Craven Week tournament held in Graaff-Reinet, scoring a penalty in their win over Boland. In 2013, he made three starts for Eastern Province at the Under-16 Grant Khomo Week held in Vanderbijlpark, which included a match that saw him score a try and five points with the boot against Western Province.

Bosch appeared at the premier rugby union competition at schoolboy level in South Africa, the Under-18 Craven Week, in 2014. He started the tournament in Middelburg by scoring 21 of his team's points in a 26–25 victory in their opening match before helping his team beat Free State and SWD in the final match of the tournament to be crowned unofficial champions. After the tournament, Bosch was included in a South Africa Schools team to play in the Under-18 International Series against their counterparts from France, Wales and England. He played in all three matches – starting the first and last matches – and kicked 15 points throughout the series to help his side to two wins in their three matches.

Still at school in 2015, Bosch represented Eastern Province at the Craven Week for a second time. A 21-point points tally form Bosch in their first match against SWD in a repeat of the 2014 main match was followed by 13 points in their 23–22 victory over KwaZulu-Natal in their second match to qualify for a second successive final. However, Bosch failed to help his side to back-to-back wins, as Western Province beat them 95–0 in a very one-sided final. Bosch was once again noticed by the South African Schools selectors as he earned another selection in the squad for the 2015 International Series. He kicked a total of 42 points in the three matches – ten penalties and six conversions – in victories over Wales, France and England.

=== 2016: Sharks ===
Bosch moved to Durban to join the Sharks academy for the 2016 season. His first action of the season came for the Sharks-affiliated university side UKZN Impi in the 2016 Varsity Shield. He made four appearances for the team, scoring one try in a 63–30 victory over TUT Vikings and 19 points with the boot as his side finished level at the top of the log with Wits (although a subsequent points deduction saw them demoted to third).

In March 2016, Bosch was included in a South Africa Under-20 training squad, also making the cut for a reduced provisional squad named a week later. In between training with the team, he returned to the Sharks to make a single appearance for a Sharks XV in the 2016 Currie Cup qualification series, making his first class debut in a 48–18 victory over Namibian side the Welwitschias. He came on as a replacement shortly after half-time and took just half an hour to score his first try in first class rugby, scoring the Sharks' sixth try in the 73rd minute.

On 10 May 2016, Bosch was included in the final South Africa Under-20 squad for the 2016 World Rugby Under 20 Championship tournament to be held in Manchester, England. He started their opening match in Pool C of the tournament in the fullback position as South Africa came from behind to beat Japan 59–19, with Bosch successfully converting all eight of South Africa's tries and also kicking one penalty. He switched positions with fly-half Manie Libbok for their next pool match as South Africa were beaten 13–19 by Argentina, with Bosch scoring eight of his team's points. He reverted to fullback for their final pool match, scoring a try and kicking 15 points as South Africa bounced back to secure a 40-31 bonus-point victory over France to secure a semi-final place as the best runner-up in the competition. He also started the semi-final, as South Africa faced three-time champions England. Despite Bosch scoring his second try of the competition and kicking seven points, the hosts proved too strong for South Africa, knocking them out of the competition with a 39–17 victory. His final appearance at the tournament was against Argentina in the third-place play-off match, and Bosch kicked two conversions as Argentina beat South Africa – as they did in the pool stages – convincingly winning 49–19 and in the process condemning South Africa to fourth place in the competition. As the main kicker for the team, Bosch was the top scorer for his team with 63 points.

Shortly after returning to South Africa, Bosch was included in the Sharks Super Rugby squad for their Round Sixteen match against the Cheetahs.

=== 2017–18 ===
Bosch has been a regular starter for the Sharks since 2017, being called up for South Africa's international team, the Springboks, during the 2017 Rugby Championship. Bosch made his international debut for South Africa on 19 August 2017, replacing Elton Jantjies off the bench in a 37-15 win over Argentina.

Bosch has featured prominently at fullback for the Sharks during the 2018 Super Rugby season, with Robert du Preez taking his place at first-five, becoming the leading points-scorer in the competition so far. Bosch was named in the Springbok squad again for the 2018 June internationals.

=== 2024: Moving to France ===
Bosch signed a two-year contract with French Pro D2 club CA Brive in June 2024.

=== 2026: Going To Loftus ===
Bosch made his unofficial debut vs the All Blacks on August 15 for the Bulls in a losing effort.
