= Palm Canyon Wash (Whitewater River tributary) =

Arroyo in California, US

Palm Canyon Wash is an arroyo and tributary ephemeral stream or wash of the Whitewater River, in Riverside County, California.

Palm Canyon Wash runs southward from Bull Canyon then north down Palm Canyon then east to its confluence with the Whitewater River at an elevation of 322 feet / 98 meters. Its source is at 33°36′47″N 116°33′23″W, at an elevation of 6,165 feet, at the head of Bull Canyon on the southern western slope of a ridge in the San Jacinto Mountains. The waters of Palm Canyon Wash are augmented by Bull Canyon Spring at 33°35′22″N 116°33′24″W, at an elevation of 5,331 feet / 1,625 meters. There the mouth of an unnamed creek flows north down from Vandeventer Flat into the head of Palm Canyon at its confluence with the creek of Palm Canyon Wash where it is flowing out of Bull Canyon at 33°34′08″N 116°31′43″W at an elevation of 4,460 feet. The creek or arroyo then runs northward in Palm Canyon to 33°44′59″N 116°32′08″W where the wash begins.
