= Buls =

Buls may refer to:

- Buls Bay, Antarctica
- Charles Buls (1837–1914), Belgian politician, mayor of Brussels
- Boston University Literary Society

== See also ==
- Bul (disambiguation)
- Bulls (disambiguation)
