= Bul =

Bul or BUL may refer to:

- Bulgaria
- Bul (game), a Mayan board game
- Bul FC, Ugandan football club
- BUL Transmark, an Israeli handgun manufacturer
- Bulgarian language
- Brunel University London
- Bulolo Airport in Papua New Guinea
- Buol Island, Indonesia
- Cheshvan, a Hebrew month
- Lee Bul (born 1964), South Korean sculptor
- PPS Bul, sister ship to the Papuan patrol vessel Euatel
- Bar Umar Laanat (Persian: بر عمر لعنت)

== See also ==
- Bull (disambiguation)
- Buls (disambiguation)
