= Peel Hotels =

British hotel company

- Type: Public company (LSE: PHO)
- Industry: Hospitality
- Founded: 1998
- Headquarters: London, W9; United Kingdom
- Area served: United Kingdom
- Key people: Robert Peel, chief executive
- Revenue: £15.9m (2007)
- Website: http://www.peelhotels.co.uk

Peel Hotels plc is a hotel company operating in the United Kingdom. It operates eight hotels and is listed on the AIM.

== History ==
The company was founded in 1998 by Robert Peel, when he bought the Bull Hotel in Peterborough. Since that date, the company has acquired other notable hotels, such as the famous Midland Railway Hotel in Bradford, and the King Malcolm Hotel in Dunfermline.

Recently the company has demised a 25-year lease to Clermont Leisure, owners of the Clermont Club casino in London, to open a casino in the basement of the Midland Hotel, taking advantage of the Gambling Act 2005 permitting new casino-hotels. The new hotel will be called the Guoman Club and will be the third casino in the city, which will effectively join the new Westfield Shopping Centre being built adjacent to the hotel. This lease, together with the recent disposal of land to the north of the Midland site to developers and the disposal of the Avon Gorge Hotel in Bristol, has left the hotel group debt-free.
