= Bula =

Bula or BULA may refer to:

== Places ==
- Bula, Camarines Sur, a municipality in the Philippines
- Bula (Guinea-Bissau), sector in Guinea-Bissau
- Bula, Indonesia, a district on Seram Island
- Bula, Texas, US
- Bula, West Virginia, US
- Bula (river) in Tatarstan and Chuvashia, Russia
- Clipped form of Ashtabula, Ohio, US

== Other uses ==
- Bula, a Fijian word that translates as either "hello" or "life"
- Bulă, a stock character in Romanian comedy
- Bula (horse), a racehorse that won the Champion Hurdle in 1971 and 1972
- Basic Ultra-Light Aeroplane, a Canadian aircraft category
- Beach Ultimate Lovers Association, a body promoting the sport of Beach Ultimate
- I. L. Bula (1921–?), Fijian cricketer
- Bula (band), a Brazilian alternative rock band
- Bundeslager (BuLa) or "federal camp" hosted by Swiss or German scout associations, particularly Swiss Guide and Scout Movement#BuLa Jamborees

== See also ==
- Bula Bula
- Bulla (disambiguation)
