= Bulle (disambiguation) =

Bulle is a municipality in the canton of Fribourg, Switzerland.

Bulle may also refer to:

- FC Bulle, based in the Swiss town
- Bulle, Doubs, France
- Heinrich Bulle (1867–1945), German archeologist

== See also ==
- Bull (disambiguation)
- Bulles, Oise, France
