= Bull Canyon =

Bull Canyon may refer to:

- Bull Canyon (California), Riverside County, California
- Bull Canyon Formation, a geological formation in New Mexico
- Bull Canyon Provincial Park, British Columbia, Canada
