= Bubble =

Bubble, Bubbles or The Bubble may refer to:

== Common uses ==
- Bubble (physics), a globule of one substance in another, usually gas in a liquid
  - Soap bubble
- Economic bubble, a situation where asset prices are much higher than underlying fundamentals

== Arts, entertainment and media ==
=== Fictional characters ===
- Bubble, in Absolutely Fabulous
- Bubble, in the animated series Adventure Time episode "BMO Lost"
- Bubble, from the animated web series The Amazing Digital Circus
- Bubble, from Battle for Dream Island, an animated web series
- Bubble, in the video game Clu Clu Land
- Bubbles (Trailer Park Boys)
- Bubbles (The Wire)
- Bubbles Utonium, in The Powerpuff Girls
  - Bubbles (Miyako Gotokuji), in Powerpuff Girls Z
- Bubbles (The Adventures of Little Carp)
- Bubbles the Clown, a doll used in the BBC's Test Card F
- Bubbles, an oriole from the Angry Birds franchise
- Bubbles, a yellow tang fish in the Finding Nemo franchise
- Lourdes "Bubbles" Torres, in Philippine action drama series FPJ's Ang Probinsyano
- Samantha "Bubbles" Montenegro, in Philippine action drama series FPJ's Batang Quiapo
- Bubbles, in Jabberjaw
- Bubbles, in The Adventures of Timmy the Tooth
- Bubbles, the pet goldfish of Peanut, Baby Butter and Jelly Otter in PB&J Otter
- Cobra Bubbles, in Lilo & Stitch
- Bubbles DeVere, in Little Britain
- Bubbles, in Oddbods
- Bubbles, in the webcomic Questionable Content
- Bubbles Yablonsky, the protagonist in a series of novels by Sarah Strohmeyer
- Bubbles, several SpongeBob SquarePants characters

=== Film and television ===
==== Film ====
- Bubble (2005 film), a drama by Steven Soderbergh
- Bubble (2022 film), a Japanese animated film
- Bubbles (film), a 1930 short film
- The Bubble (1966 film), a science fiction film
- The Bubble (2001 film), a Greek film
- The Bubble (2006 film), an Israeli romantic drama
- The Bubble (2022 film), an American comedy

==== Television ====
- The Bubble (game show), 2010
- "Bubbles", a 1997 episode of Teletubbies
- "The Bubble" (30 Rock), a 2009 TV episode
- "The Bubble" (Parks and Recreation), a 2011 TV episode

=== Literature ===
- A Bubble, an 1895 novel by Lucy Bethia Walford
- The Bubble, a 1984 novel by Mulk Raj Anand
- Bubbles, a 2000 novel by Peter Prince
- Bubble, a 2012 novel by Anders de la Motte

=== Gaming ===
- Bubbles (video game), 1982
- Bubbles, gameplay items in the video game LittleBigPlanet

=== Music ===
==== Artists and labels ====
- Bubbles (band), a Swedish girl group
- Bubbles (rapper), from Roll Deep
- Bubbles, a record label owned by Erlend Øye and Marcin Oz of The Whitest Boy Alive

==== Songs ====
- "Bubble" (Band-Maid song), 2019
- "Bubble" (Fluke song), 1994
- "Bubble" (G.E.M. song), 2012
- "Bubble" (STAYC song), 2023
- "Bubble" (Takagi & Ketra song), 2022
- "Bubbles" (song), by Biffy Clyro, 2009
- "Bubble", by Imagine Dragons from the super deluxe edition of Night Visions
- "Bubbles", a version of the song "I'm Forever Blowing Bubbles" adapted as the anthem of the West Ham United football club
- "Bubble", by Aespa from Rich Man, 2025
- "Bubbles", by Aldous Harding from Warm Chris, 2022
- "Bubbles", by Frankie Laine, 1955
- "Bubbles", by The Free Design from Stars/Time/Bubbles/Love, 1970
- "Bubbles", by Herbie Hancock from Man-Child, 1976
- "Bubbles", by James from Hey Ma, 2008
- "Bubbles", by Norman Connors from You Are My Starship, written by Shunzo Ono, 1976
- "Bubbles", by Pop Will Eat Itself, first released as B-side to "Beaver Patrol", 1987
- "Bubble", by Red Velvet from Cosmic, 2024
- "Bubbles", by Spooky Tooth from It's All About, 1968
- "Bubble", by Squarepusher (credited as Tom Jenkinson) from Bubble and Squeak, 1996
- "Bubbles", by System of a Down from Steal This Album!, 2002
- "The Bubble", by Status Quo from The Party Ain't Over Yet, 2005

=== Other uses in arts, entertainment and media ===
- Bubbles (painting), by Sir John Everett Millais, 1886, also used to market Pears soap
- Bubbles: Spheres Volume I: Microspherology, a work by Peter Sloterdijk
- Bubble Comics, a Russian comic book publisher
- Bubble (podcast), a scripted science fiction podcast

== People ==
- Bubbles Anderson (Theodore M. Anderson, 1904–1943), American baseball player in the Negro leagues
- Bubbles Hargrave (Eugene Franklin Hargrave, 1892–1969), American baseball player
- Bubbles Paraiso (Pilar Angela D. Paraiso, born 1984), Filipina actress
- Barney Bubbles (Colin Fulcher, 1942–1983), English graphic artist
- John W. Bubbles (John William Sublett, 1902–1986), American entertainer
- Patricia Harmsworth, Viscountess Rothermere (1933–1992), English socialite and actress
- William James (Royal Navy officer, born 1881) (1881–1974), British admiral, politician and author
  - Bubbles (painting)
- Billy Myers (Canadian football) (1923–2019)
- Mary Nolan (1902–1948), American actress, singer and dancer
- John O'Dwyer (born 1991), Irish hurler
- Beverly Sills (1929–2007), opera singer
- Bianca Sloof, a contestant on Real Chance of Love (season 1) and Charm School with Ricki Lake

== Science and technology ==
- Bubble chamber, a particle detector in physics
- Bubble Nebula, NGC 7635, in space
- Bubble Nebula (NGC 6822), in space
- Bubble (computing), a delay in a pipeline
- Bubble (programming language), developed by Bubble Group
- Bubble memory, a type computer memory
- Bubble, a negation logic gate symbol

== Sports ==
- Bio-secure bubble, an isolation zone used for hosting sporting events
  - 2020 NBA Bubble
- Bubble, a term used in poker tournaments
- Bubble, in the NCAA basketball tournament selection process

== Other uses ==
- Bubbles (chimpanzee), who lived with Michael Jackson
- Bubbles, a hippopotamus who escaped from Lion Country Safari in Irvine, California, U.S.
- Bubble, or pizzo, a pipe used to freebase drugs
- Bubbles, a mephedrone product, a synthetic stimulant drug
- Filter bubble, a state of intellectual isolation
- Bubble, a style of Hi-Riser automobile

== See also ==
- Babel (disambiguation)
- Bubble Act, a 1720 Act of the Parliament of Great Britain
- Bubble and squeak, a British vegetable dish
- Bubble Boy (disambiguation)
- Bubble tea, a tea-based drink
- Bubble Gang, a Philippine television sketch comedy show
- Bubblegum
- Bubble wrap, a packaging material
- Bulla (disambiguation) (Latin, 'bubble')
- Champagne, a French sparkling wine
- "I'm Forever Blowing Bubbles", a popular American song written in 1918
- Microbubble, a very small bubble
- Speech balloon, or speech bubble, a graphic convention
- Support bubble (disambiguation)
