= Navan =

Town in County Meath, Ireland

Navan An Uaimh (Irish)
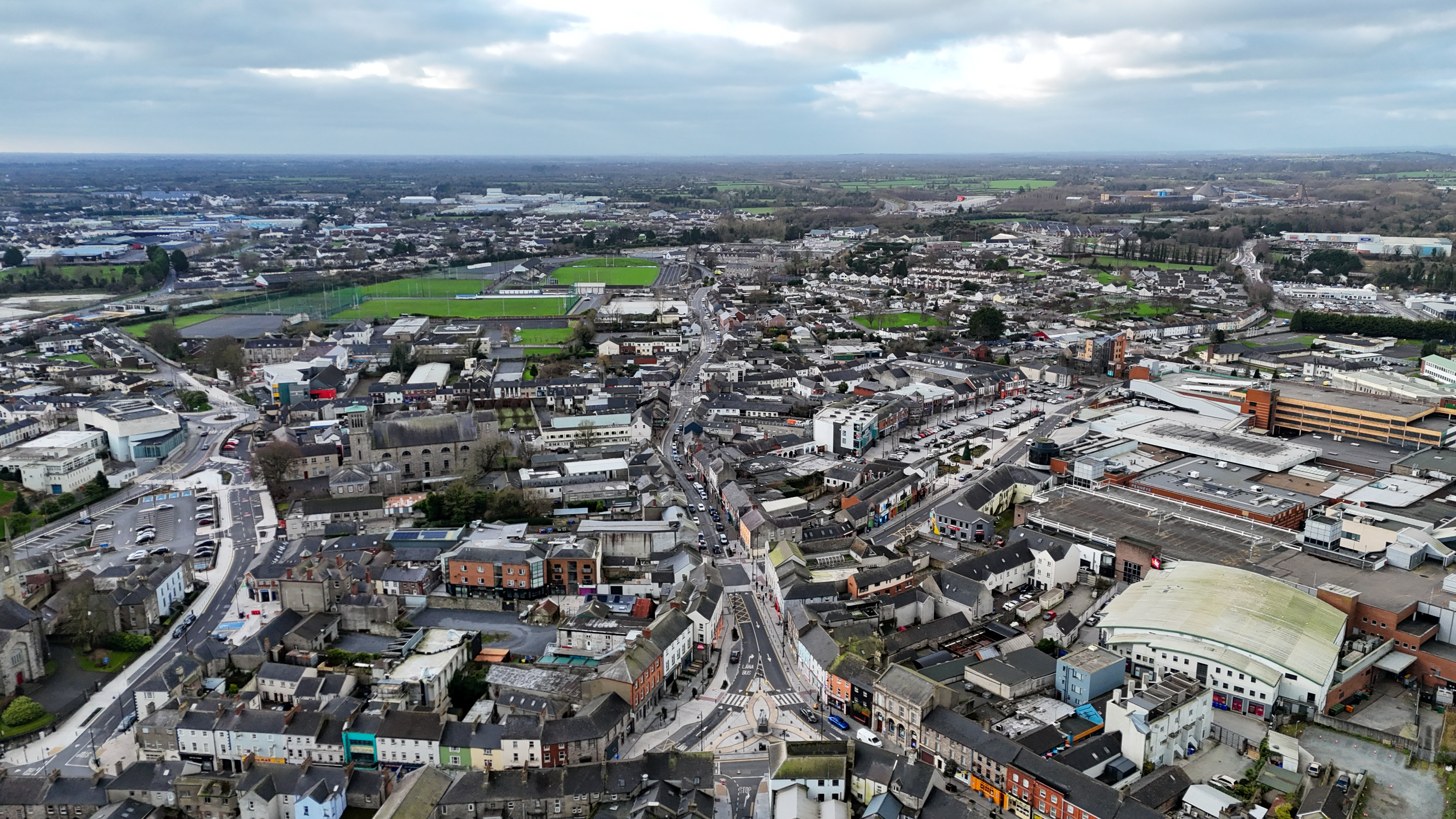
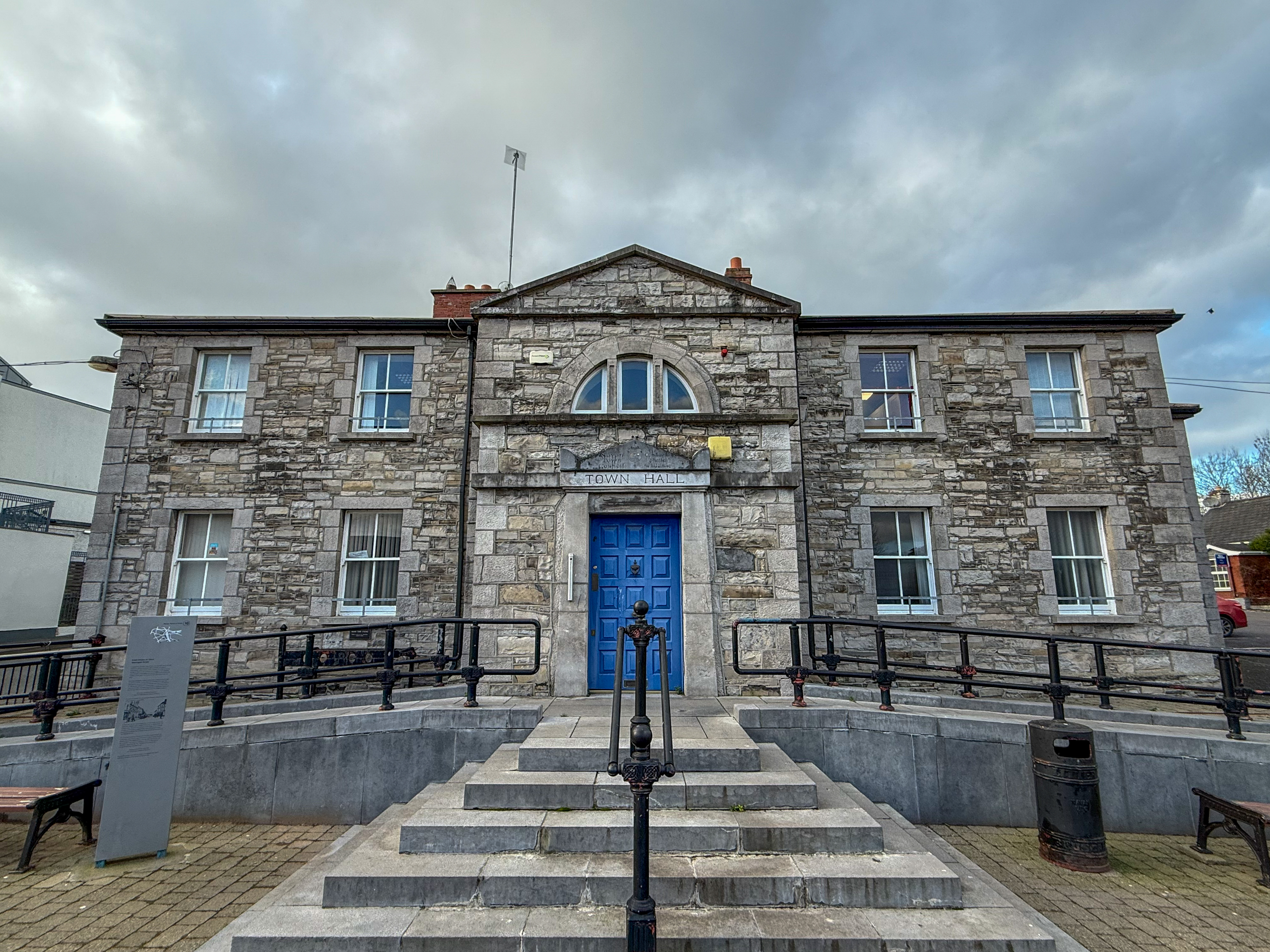
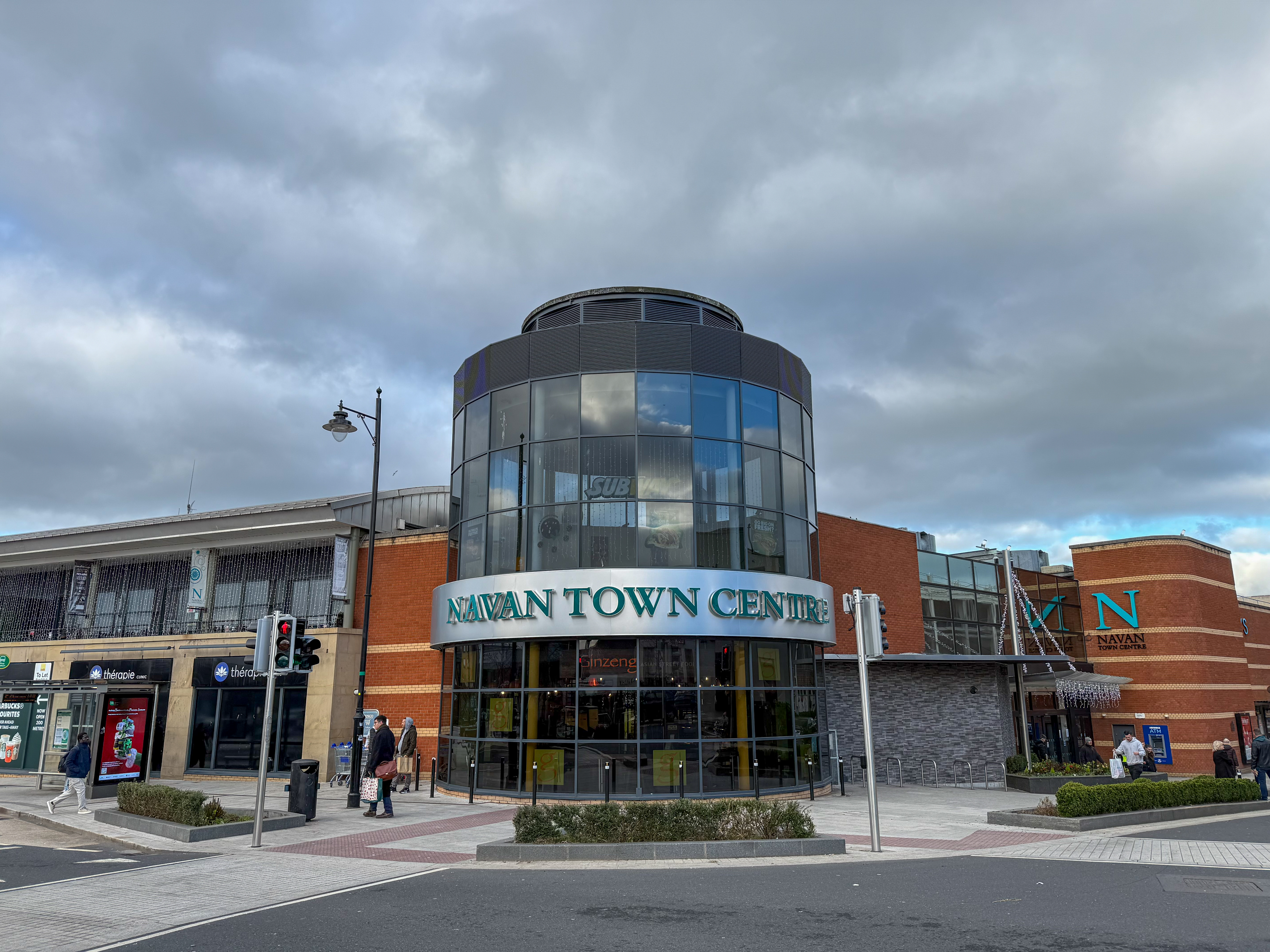
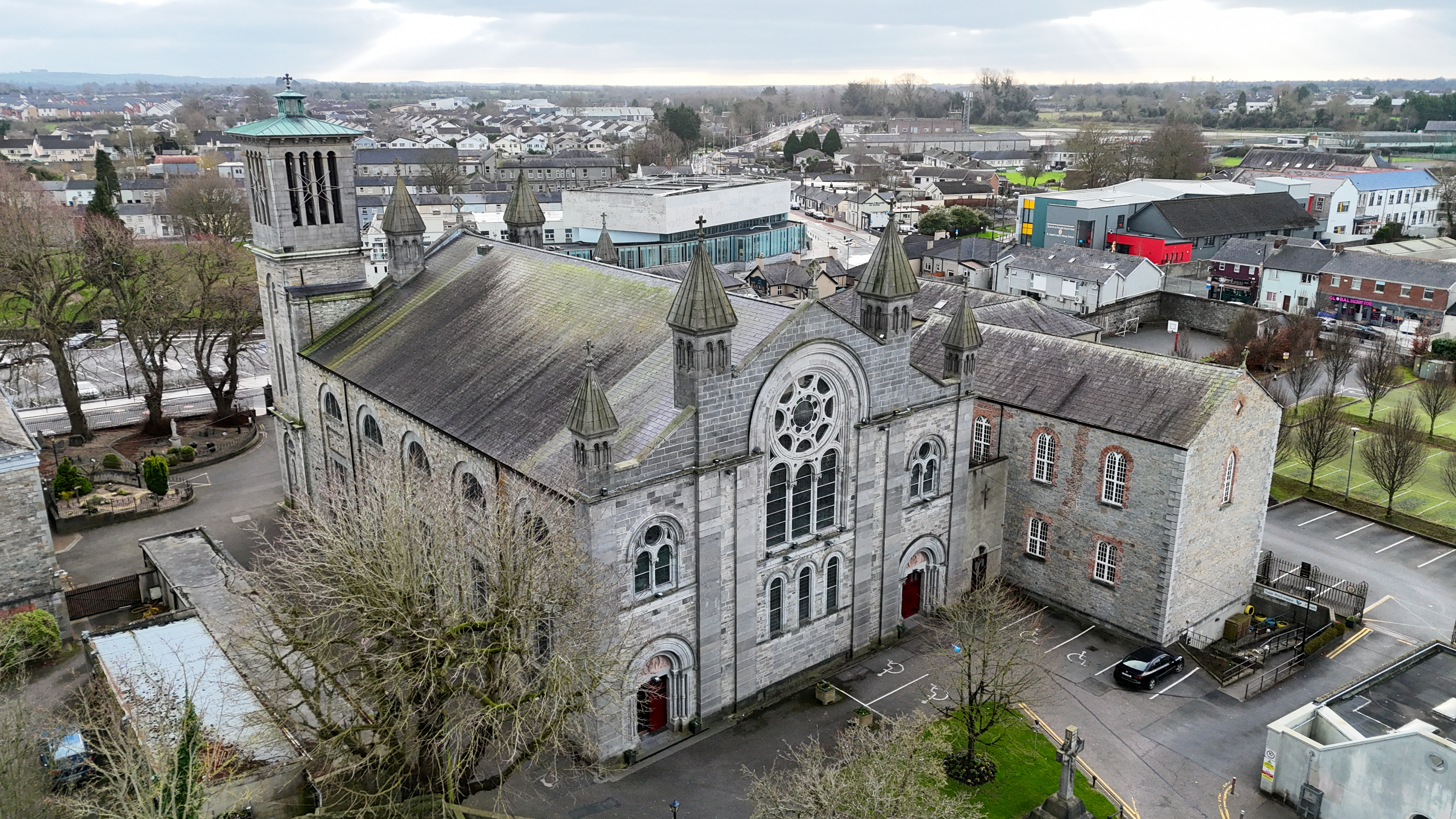
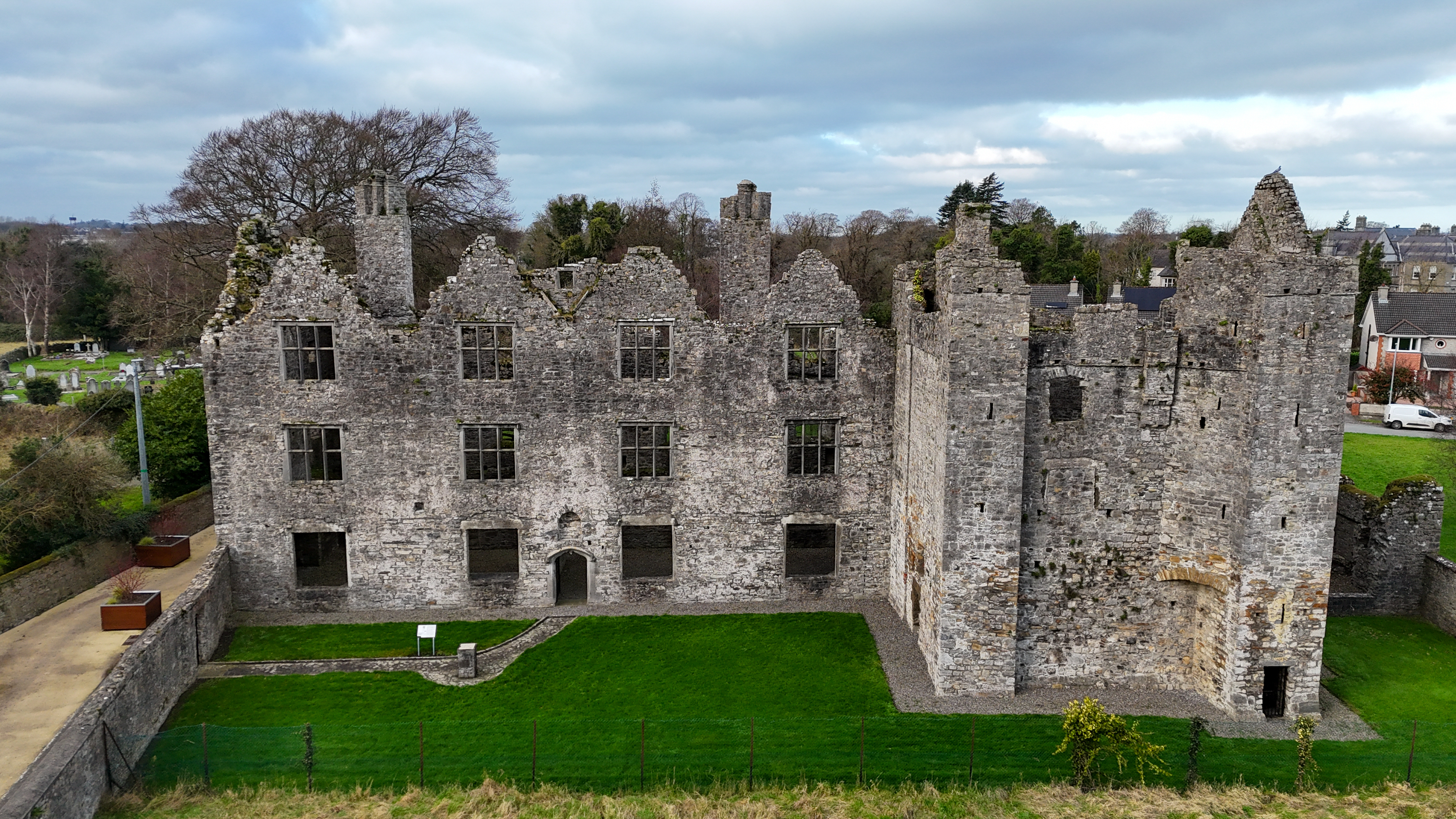
- Town skyline Navan Town Hall Navan Town Centre St Mary's Church Athlumney Castle

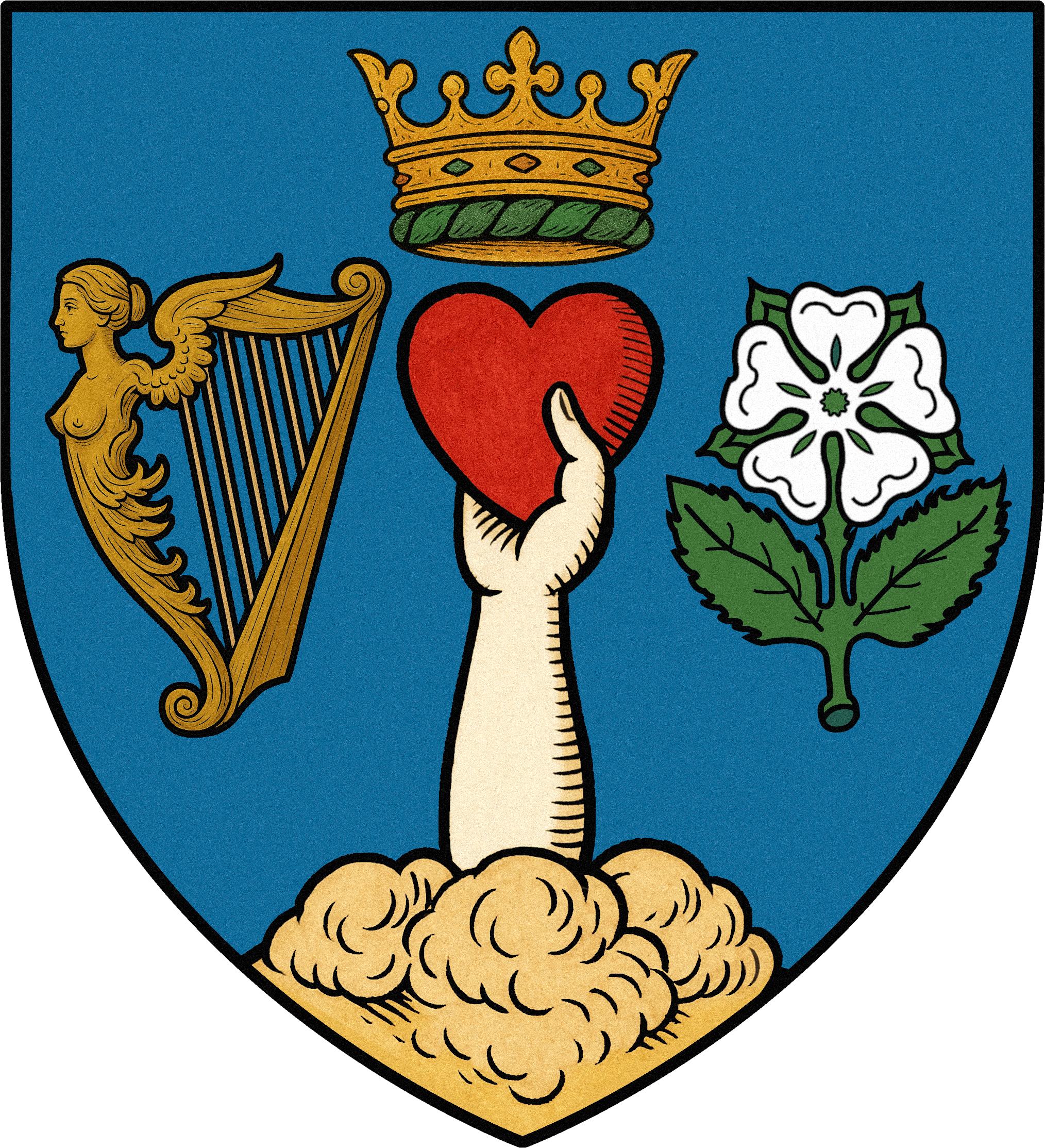
- Coat of arms

- Location in Ireland Navan (Europe)
- Coordinates: 53.6528°N 6.6814°W
- Country: Ireland
- Province: Leinster
- County: County Meath
- Dáil constituency: Meath West
- Elevation: 42 m (138 ft)

Population (2022)
  - Rank: 9th
  - Urban: 33,886
- Time zone: UTC±0 (WET)
  - Summer (DST): UTC+1 (IST)
- Eircode routing key: C15
- Telephone area code: +353(0)46
- Website: meath.ie

Navan (Note: /ˈnævən/ NAV-ən; Irish: An Uaimh [ənˠ ˈuəvʲ], meaning "the Cave") is the county town and largest town of County Meath, Ireland. It is at the confluence of the River Boyne and Blackwater, around 50 km northwest of Dublin. At the 2022 census, it had a population of 33,886, making it the fourteenth largest settlement in all of Ireland. The town is in a civil parish of the same name.

== Etymology ==
The Modern Irish name An Uaimh is most likely derived from the prehistoric burial mound An Odhbha, named after Odhbha, the first wife of Érimón. It is likely the result of Odbha being later misunderstood and confused by locals with the similar sounding and much more familiar word uaimh, or uamha, which also has a very similar meaning "cave, crypt or souterrain". The Modern English name Navan is likely either an anglicisation of An Uaimh, which was often written and pronounced An Uamhainn, or of An Odhbha(n). An Uaimh was the town's sole official name from the foundation of the Irish Free State in 1922 until 1970, when it was changed to Navan. Since the Official Languages Act 2003, both the Irish and English names have had equal status, as in the rest of the State.

== History ==
=== Prehistory ===
==== An Odhbha ====
Originally An Odhbha was probably a prehistoric tumulus, one of many in the Boyne Valley.

==== Roman Artefacts ====
A small Roman copper alloy figure was found in the River Boyne near Navan. The figurine most likely represents a Lar, a Roman deity believed to protect the household. It is likely that the figure was placed in the river as a votive offering as in Irish mythology the river was considered divine and to have been created by the goddess Boann (Bóinn in Modern Irish). This belief in the divinity of rivers was shared by the Romans. Two Roman coins have also been found in Navan.

=== Middle Ages ===
The town of Navan was founded by the Normans: Hugh de Lacy, who was granted the Lordship of Meath in 1172, awarded the Barony of Navan to one of his knights, Jocelyn de Angulo, who built a fort there, from which the town developed.

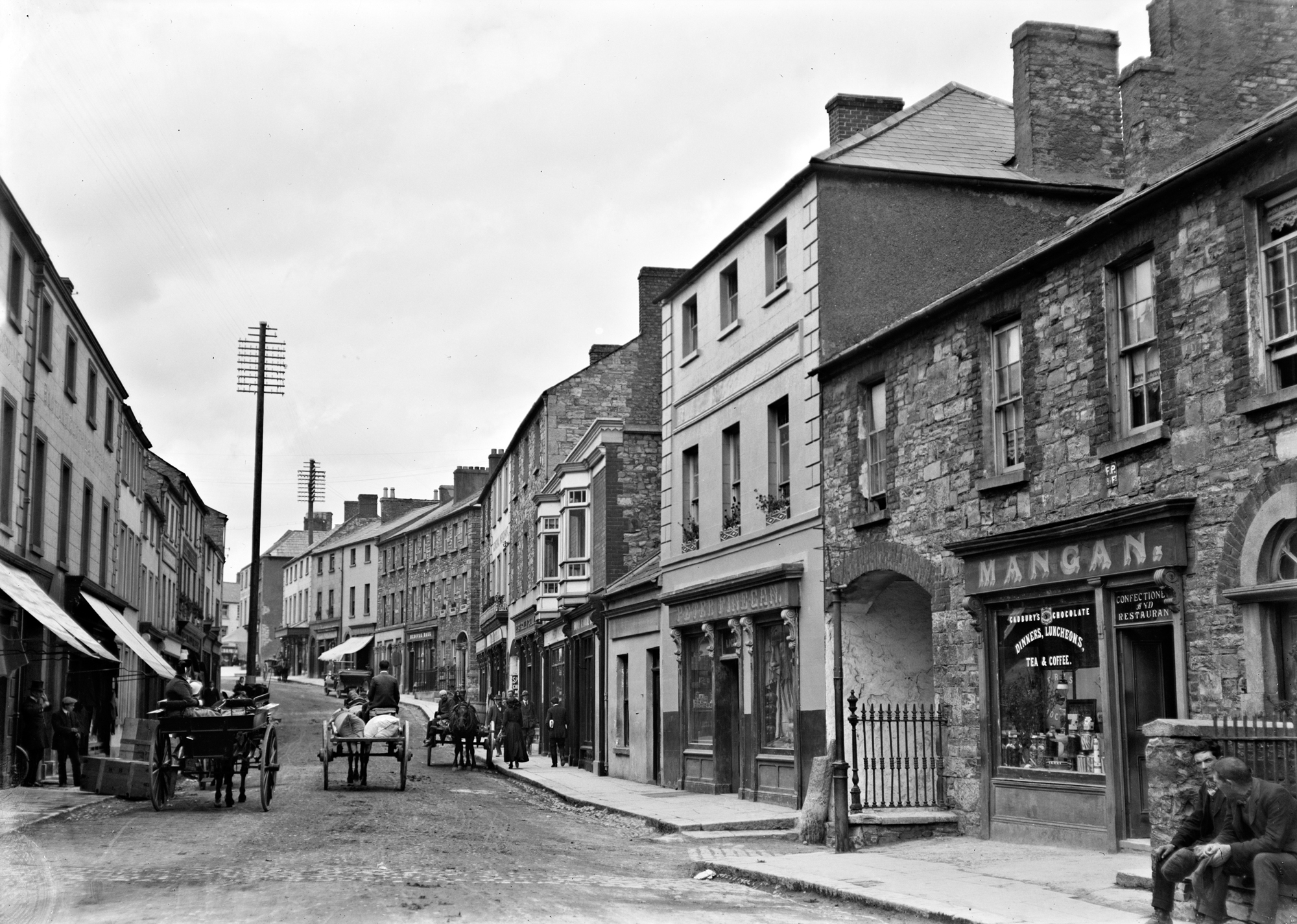
Ludlow Street circa 1900–1939

Inside the town walls were three streets: Trimgate Street, Watergate Street and Dublingate Street (now called Ludlow Street). The orientation of the three original streets remains from the Middle Ages but the buildings date from the Victorian and Edwardian periods.

=== Modern era ===
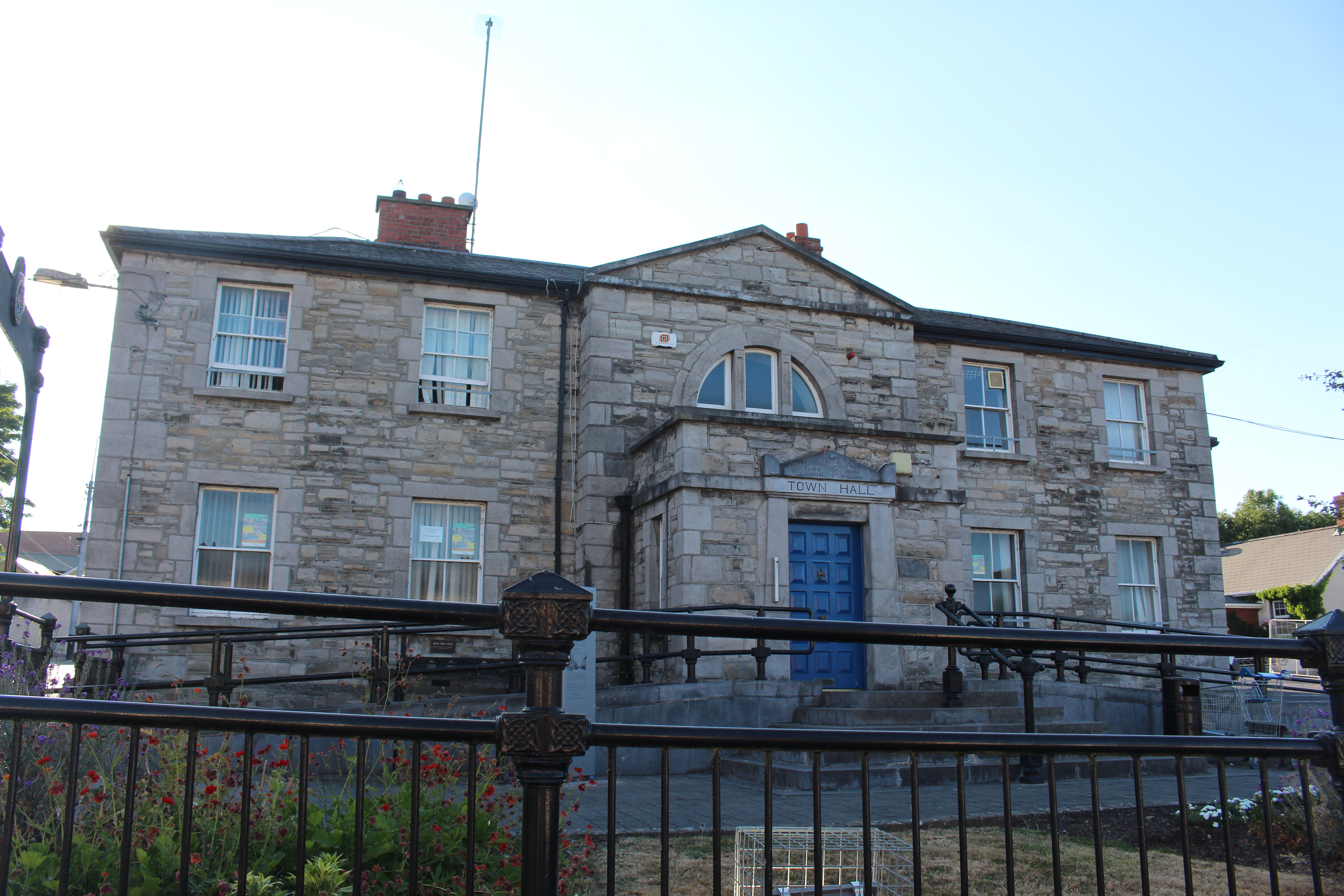
Navan Town Hall

Navan Town Hall started life as the local bridewell in 1831 and only became a municipal facility in 1983.

The town's Post Office on Trimgate Street was built in 1908 on the site of an earlier post office. In 1990, the post office was relocated to Kennedy Road. The building of a new shopping centre re-oriented the town's centre. The onetime post office was acquired as the site of the town's first McDonald's restaurant.

== Geography ==
=== Climate ===
Navan has an oceanic climate (Köppen: Cfb).

Climate data for Navan
| Month | Jan | Feb | Mar | Apr | May | Jun | Jul | Aug | Sep | Oct | Nov | Dec | Year |
|---|---|---|---|---|---|---|---|---|---|---|---|---|---|
| Mean daily maximum °C (°F) | 7.6 (45.7) | 8.3 (46.9) | 9.9 (49.8) | 12.2 (54.0) | 15.1 (59.2) | 17.7 (63.9) | 18.9 (66.0) | 18.5 (65.3) | 16.7 (62.1) | 13.5 (56.3) | 9.9 (49.8) | 8.0 (46.4) | 13.0 (55.4) |
| Daily mean °C (°F) | 5.3 (41.5) | 5.6 (42.1) | 6.7 (44.1) | 8.6 (47.5) | 11.5 (52.7) | 14.2 (57.6) | 15.6 (60.1) | 15.2 (59.4) | 13.5 (56.3) | 10.6 (51.1) | 7.5 (45.5) | 5.7 (42.3) | 10.0 (50.0) |
| Mean daily minimum °C (°F) | 3.0 (37.4) | 3.0 (37.4) | 3.6 (38.5) | 5.0 (41.0) | 7.8 (46.0) | 10.5 (50.9) | 12.3 (54.1) | 12.0 (53.6) | 10.3 (50.5) | 7.9 (46.2) | 5.0 (41.0) | 3.5 (38.3) | 7.0 (44.6) |
| Average precipitation mm (inches) | 65.8 (2.59) | 58.4 (2.30) | 59.4 (2.34) | 60.4 (2.38) | 73.2 (2.88) | 75.1 (2.96) | 78.1 (3.07) | 84.6 (3.33) | 69.5 (2.74) | 82.9 (3.26) | 78.9 (3.11) | 75.1 (2.96) | 861.4 (33.92) |
Source: Weather.Directory

== Demographics ==
Historical population
| Year | Pop. | ±% |
|---|---|---|
| 1813 | 3,802 | — |
| 1821 | 3,500 | −7.9% |
| 1831 | 4,416 | +26.2% |
| 1841 | 5,628 | +27.4% |
| 1851 | 3,979 | −29.3% |
| 1861 | 3,865 | −2.9% |
| 1871 | 4,104 | +6.2% |
| 1881 | 3,873 | −5.6% |
| 1891 | 3,963 | +2.3% |
| 1901 | 3,839 | −3.1% |
| 1911 | 3,934 | +2.5% |
| 1926 | 3,652 | −7.2% |
| 1936 | 4,123 | +12.9% |
| 1946 | 4,102 | −0.5% |
| 1951 | 4,271 | +4.1% |
| 1956 | 4,813 | +12.7% |
| 1961 | 5,255 | +9.2% |
| 1966 | 5,907 | +12.4% |
| 1971 | 6,665 | +12.8% |
| 1981 | 11,136 | +67.1% |
| 1986 | 11,929 | +7.1% |
| 1991 | 11,706 | −1.9% |
| 1996 | 12,810 | +9.4% |
| 2002 | 19,417 | +51.6% |
| 2006 | 24,851 | +28.0% |
| 2011 | 28,559 | +14.9% |
| 2016 | 30,173 | +5.7% |
| 2022 | 33,886 | +12.3% |

In 2022, there were 33,707 people residing in Navan. In 2022, according to the CSO, the town is 64.2% White Irish and 1.9% Irish Traveller, 17.8% White of any other background, 3.9% Black, 4.1% Asian, 3.6% any other racial background, and 4.3% not stated.

== Culture ==
=== Public art ===
Public art and sculptures in Navan include Sniomh, by Betty Newman Maguire, which sits in front of Navan Fire Station. This sculpture is reputedly inspired by the movement of water and the merging of the rivers Boyne and Blackwater.

Another public sculpture, The Fifth Province by Richard King, is located on the Navan Bypass. This sculpture is composed of four branches and a central upright stem that symbolises the flowering of hope and peace.

The Bull, designed by sculptor Colin Grehan, is a prominent piece of public art. Situated in the market square of the town, this is a 16-tonne limestone statue of a bull being held back by two handlers and commemorates the historic bull markets that took place in the area. The statue was surrounded by controversy over its cost, an estimated €90,000, and its location. Local man Paddy Pryle noted that "anybody coming up Timmons Hill, which is one of the main entrances into the town, will be entering Navan via the bull's arse. It is one of the most crazy things I have seen put up yet," Objections to the statue delayed its erection by 8 years.

On the Great Wide open is a 3.2m stone sculpture of a man carrying a large stone on his shoulder, created by Patrick Barry to pay tribute to all those who dedicated their life to Navan's mining industry. Originally,the piece was unveiled in 2012 by then Mayor of Navan Anton Cabe on the Kells Road roundabout near Tara Mines,however it has since been placed into storage pending relocation following the removal of the roundabout.

=== Folklore ===
According to local folklore, a Souterrain was discovered near the Navan Viaduct in 1848. The location of its entrance has since been lost.

Another folk tale involves the ghost of Francis Ledwidge. According to the story an old friend of Ludwidge was working at the Meath Chronicle, the local news printer, when he heard the sound of Ledwidge's motorcycle outside. His friend was confused as he believed Ledwidge was fighting on the Western Front; upon going out to greet him the friend found that Ledwidge had disappeared. The story claims that this ghostly apparition appeared at the same moment he died.

== Sports ==
=== Gaelic Games ===
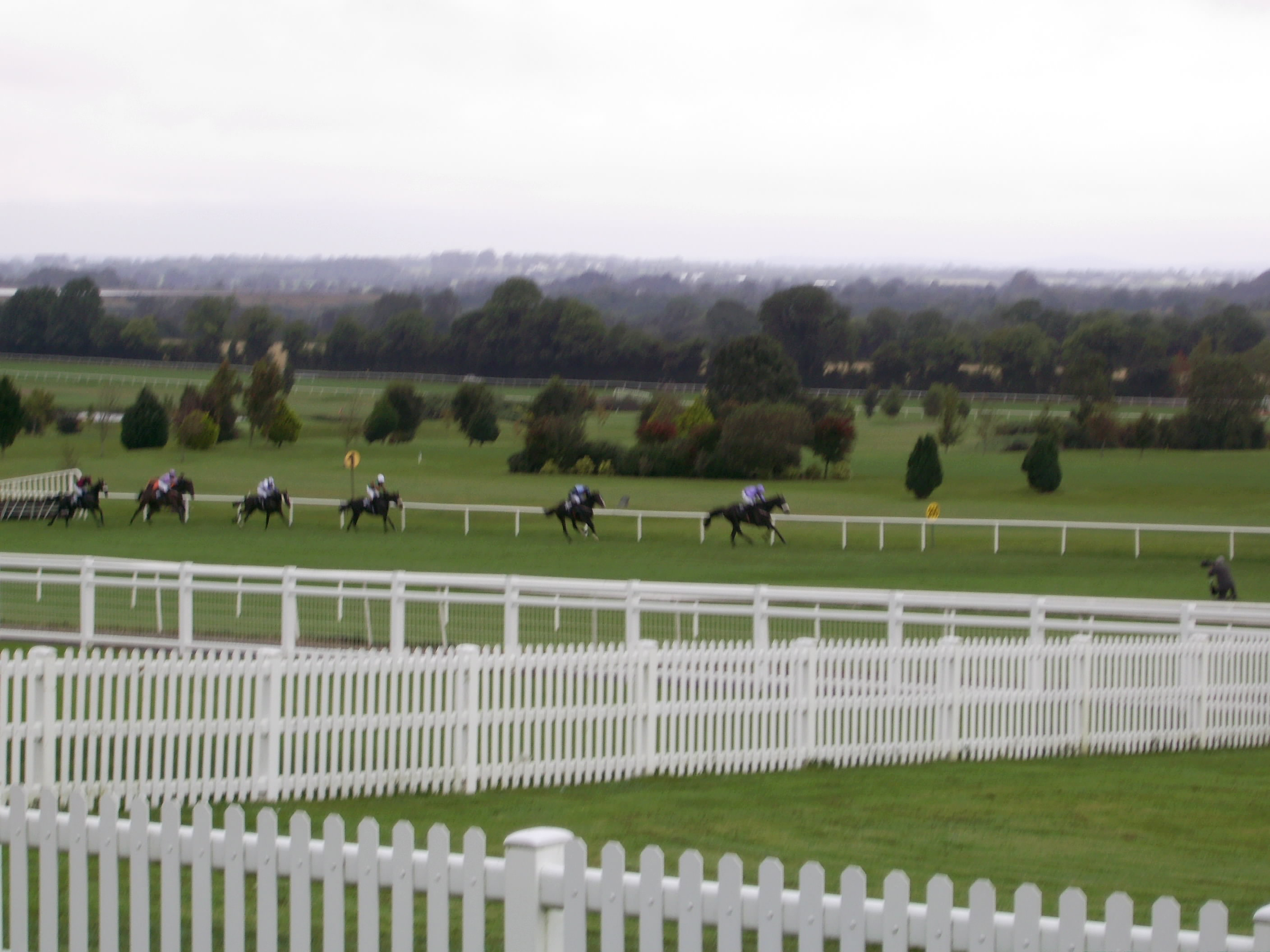
Navan Races (September 2007)

Navan is home to several GAA clubs, including Navan O'Mahonys and Simonstown Gaels.

Páirc Tailteann is a stadium in Navan and is home of the Meath Gaelic football and Hurling teams.

=== Association football ===
Parkvilla Football Club was founded in 1966 and currently plays in North East Football league Premier Division and their reserve team competes in Division 3B.

=== Rugby ===
Navan R.F.C. was founded in 1925 and have competed in Division 2B of the All Ireland League (AIL) during the 2010s.

=== Cricket ===
Knockharley Cricket Club was founded in 1982 and is the only cricket club in County Meath competing in the Leinster Cricket Union. The club's most recent success came in 2006 when the 1st XI won the Middle 2 Leinster Cup, defeating Mullingar at North Kildare.

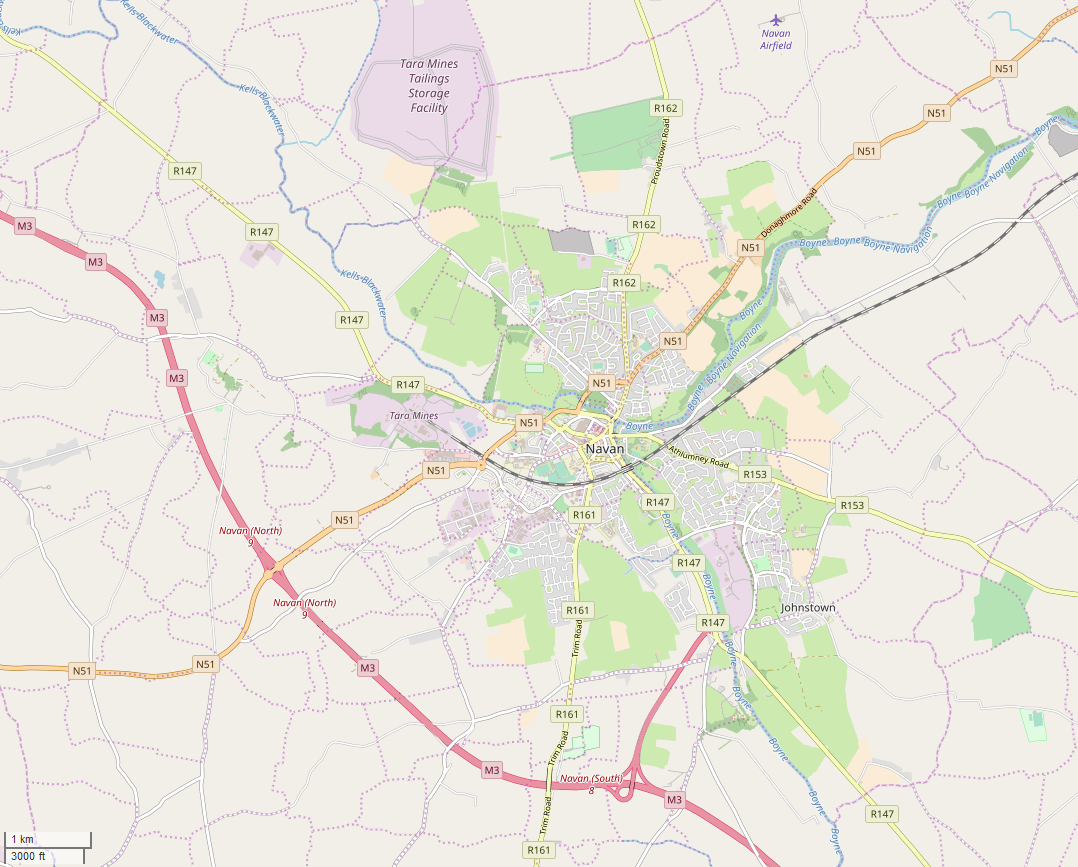
Map of Navan

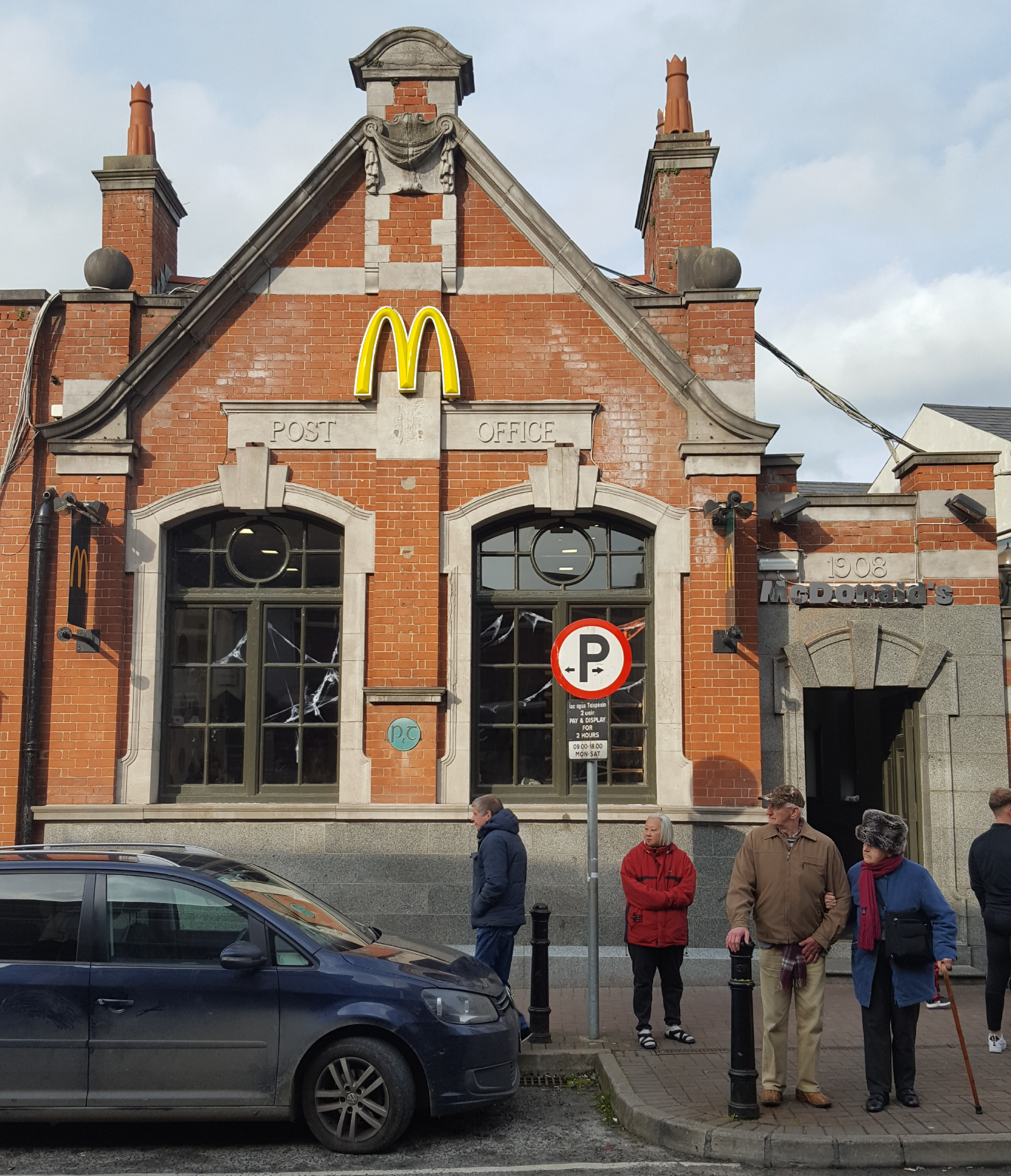
Former Post Office converted to a McDonalds

== Transport ==
Navan railway station closed in 1958 meaning buses are the primary method of public transport in the town. Navan is served by several bus routes. The town has no central bus station.

Since 2025, there are two town bus routes operated by Bus Éireann, the NV1 and the NV2.

- NV1 runs from Gainstown to Dunville Road, serving the town centre and areas of the town east of the Boyne River.
- NV2 runs from Gainstown to Belcourt, serving the town centre and areas north of the Boyne and Blackwater Rivers.

Navan is also served by a number of other Bus Éireann operated PSO services. The primary of which is the NX service which provides an express service to Dublin City Centre and operates at a frequency of up to every 20 minutes. The 109 which serves a number of other towns in County Meath such as Kells and Dunshauglin, 109X Dublin to Cavan service and the 109A which provides a direct connection to Dublin Airport also serve the town.

Sillan also serve the town. Royal Breffni Tours provide services to Dundalk Institute of Technology. Streamline Coaches provide services to NUI Maynooth.

== Education ==
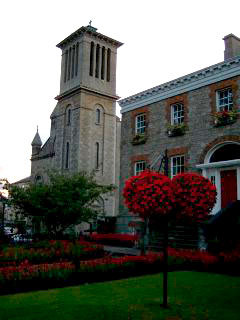
St. Mary's Church

Navan has a number of secondary schools, including private denominational and public inter-denominational and non-denominational. St. Patrick's Classical School is a Roman Catholic boys-only school. Loreto Secondary School, St. Michael's at the Loreto Convent, and St. Joseph's Secondary School at the Mercy Convent are both girls-only Roman Catholic convent schools. Coláiste na Mí is a VEC-run school in Johnstown that opened in 2013. Beaufort College is a large state-owned inter-denominational vocational school. The Abylity Secondary College was a parent-owned fee-paying non-denominational school.

Navan and the surrounding area have a number of primary schools, including the town's Catholic boys' primary school, Scoil Mhuire, which was originally run by the De La Salle Brothers. Pierce Brosnan is a former pupil of St. Anne's Loreto, which is situated beside St. Mary's Catholic Church and near St. Joseph's Mercy. There are also St. Paul's, St. Stephen's, St. Ultan's, and St. Oliver's primary schools. Scoil Éanna is the town's only gaelscoil. The town's only Church of Ireland secondary school, Preston School, closed in the 1970s. It is now the site of the shopping centre in the town. There is a Church of Ireland primary school known as Flowerfield School, on the Trim Rd., a new site. It was originally situated at the Flowerfield area of the town, on the main thoroughfare to Drogheda, in a building that has been sympathetically converted into private accommodation. There is also a multi-denominational Educate Together primary school in the town, sited at Commons Road.

== Media ==
The Meath Chronicle, a local newspaper serving the county, is based in Navan.

== Notable people ==
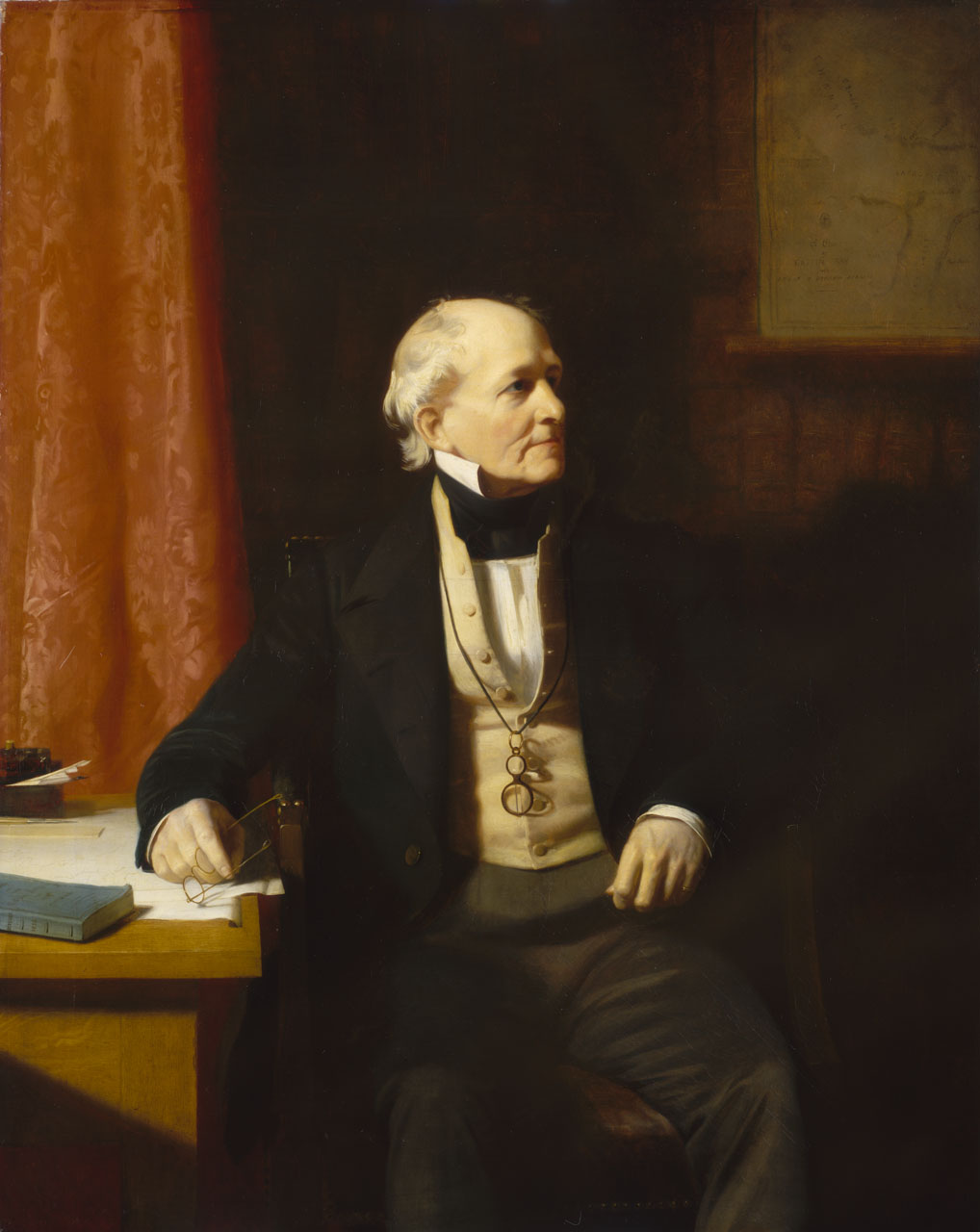
Sir Francis Beaufort

- Yemi Adenuga, TV personality and Ireland's first black female elected Councillor
- Rear Admiral Sir Francis Beaufort, naval officer and scientist
- Pierce Brosnan, actor
- Shane Cassells, Fianna Fáil politician
- Ian Clarke, computer scientist
- Sam Curtis, professional footballer
- Keith Donegan, racing driver
- Simon Fagan, musician
- Anthony Holten, author
- Donal Keogan, Gaelic footballer
- Gráinne Maguire, stand-up comedian, writer and podcaster
- Arthur Mathews, comedy writer
- Helen McEntee, Fine Gael politician
- Dylan Moran, comedian
- Conor Nash, Australian Rules Footballer
- John O'Callaghan, DJ
- Hector Ó hEochagáin, TV personality
- Joseph Rooney, Catholic priest
- Tommy Tiernan, comedian
- The Most Rev. Paul Tighe, Titular Bishop of Drivastum, currently Secretary of the Section of Culture of the Dicastery for Culture and Education in the Roman Curia in the Holy See

== International relations ==
Navan is twinned with the following places:

- Bobbio, Italy, since 2003
- Broccostella, Italy, since 2005

== See also ==
- List of towns and villages in the Republic of Ireland
- List of palindromic places
