= Simon Fagan =

Irish singer/songwriter from Navan

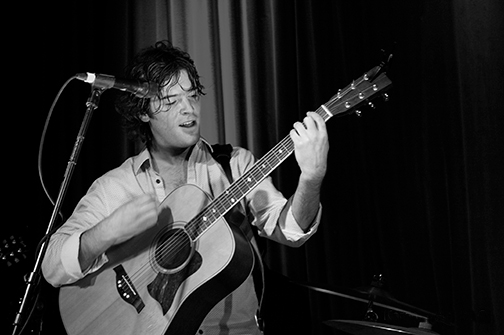

Background information
- Born: Simon Fagan; 23 May 1981 (age 44)
- Origin: Navan, Ireland
- Genres: Pop rock, Americana, Acoustic Rock, folk
- Occupation: Singer–songwriter
- Instruments: Vocals (Baritone), Guitar, Trumpet, piano
- Years active: 2007–present
- Label: Loose Robe Productions
- Website: http://www.simonfagan.net/

Simon Fagan (born 23 May 1981) is an Irish singer/songwriter from Navan. He has been performing music since the age of 5.

Simon Fagan's debut EP, Hired and Fired, was released by SiAn Records in March 2009 and his debut album Outside Looking In has been recorded.

== Musical career ==
=== Early life and breakthrough ===
Fagan's musical career started in his parish choir at the age of 5. At 7 he was taught how to play the cornet and joined his local brass band before picking up the trumpet. He later received a musical scholarship to St. Finian's College. While in his senior year, Simon joined the National Youth Orchestra of Ireland. After school he went on to study orchestral trumpet at both the Royal Irish Academy of Music and the Royal Scottish Academy of Music and Drama. During this period Simon sang in a number of original bands in both Dublin and Glasgow.

After college Simon chose to focus on a career as a singer songwriter.

In 2007 Simon teamed up with composer Brian Byrne and recorded a 14 track album in both Ireland and Los Angeles. Although never released, it earned Simon a slot in the Point Theatre, Dublin to open up for Lionel Richie in and then Smokey Robinson in Vicar Street.

=== Hired and Fired (2008–2009) ===
Simon joined up with producer Martin Quinn and recorded a 4 track EP called Hired And Fired. This was released through SiAn Records in March 2009. Throughout 2009 Fagan toured heavily throughout Ireland and the UK and even ventured as far as Egypt. He appeared on some high-profile radio shows including Today with Pat Kenny on RTÉ Radio 1 in Ireland, 9 BBC regional shows in the UK and both Nile FM and Nile TV in Cairo. It was during this period, that Fagan recorded a number of songs, among them was the track "Never Really Cried", which would later feature on the album Outside Looking In. The track was discovered buy Platinum Blue & Music Xray CEO Mike McCready who named it Song of the Week in The Huffington Post.

=== Outside Looking In (2010 – Present) ===
In January 2010 Simon started work on his debut album with producer Martin Quinn. Long-term friend and mentor Brian Byrne, came on board to arrange strings for the album, which were recorded by the Prague Philharmonic Orchestra. The album, titled Outside Looking In was released on 14 May. It contains the single 'Damn Honey'.

== Discography ==
=== Albums ===
- Hired And Fired EP (2009)
- Outside Looking In (2010)

=== Singles ===
- "Bring The Dance" (2008)
- "Falling into You" (2009)
- "Damn Honey" (2010)

== Interviews ==
- Interview with Simon Fagan, Three Monkeys
- Song Of The Week, Huffington Post
