= Bull Canyon (California) =

Canyon in the American state of California

Bull Canyon is a canyon at the top of Palm Canyon Wash, which is a tributary to the Whitewater River, in Riverside County, California. Bull Canyon and the creek of Palm Canyon Wash heads at 33°36′47″N 116°33′23″W, at an elevation of 6,165 feet in the southern western slope of a ridge in the San Jacinto Mountains. The waters of the creek of Palm Canyon Wash are augmented by Bull Canyon Spring at 33°35′22″N 116°33′24″W, at an elevation of 5,331 feet / 1,625 meters. The mouth of Bull Canyon is at an elevation of 4,508 feet / 1,374 meters at the head of Palm Canyon. The mouth of an unnamed creek flows north down from Vandeventer Flat into the head of Palm Canyon at its confluence with Palm Canyon Wash at 33°34′08″N 116°31′43″W at an elevation of 4,460 feet.
