= Llangefni Town Hall =

Municipal Building in Llangefni, Wales

- Neuadd y Dref Llangefni (Welsh)
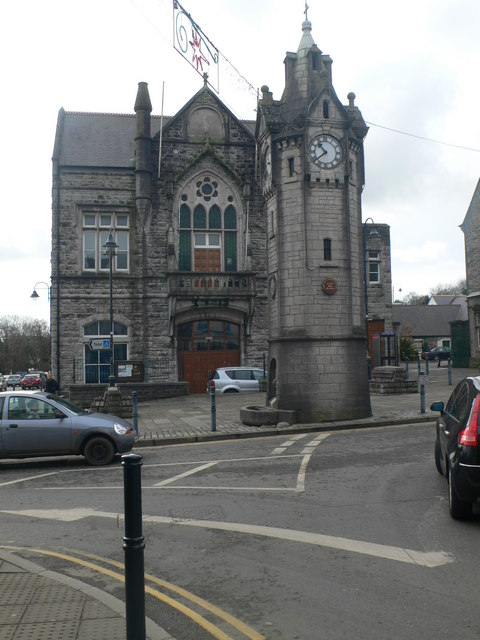
- North facade of Llangefni Town Hall and the Town Clock

- Shown in Anglesey
- 53.2555°N 4.3108°W
- Location: Llangefni

History
- Built: 1884

Site notes
- Architectural style: Neo-Gothic style

Listed Building – Grade II
- Designated: 10 November 1986
- Reference no.: 5738

Llangefni Town Hall (Welsh: Neuadd y Dref Llangefni) is a civic building dating back to the mid-19th century, in the town of Llangefni, Anglesey, Wales. It is a Grade II listed building.

== Description ==
Llangefni Town Hall is located in the centre of the town with its main three-bay Neo-Gothic facade facing onto the south side of Bulkeley Square. It has a 6-window length range to the rear. The tall two-storey building is constructed of limestone, with a slate roof and decorative terracotta ridge tiles. The Town Hall is Grade II listed, being a prominent town building which forms a visual grouping with the nearby Town Clock (erected 1902) and Bull Hotel.

The front elevation has an arched main entrance centrally at ground floor level, over which is a first floor balcony and parapet. At first floor level is a tall central traceried window and, above that, an arched recess which once contained a clock.

== History ==
The building is known to date from before 1887/8 and variously claimed to date from 1841 or 1871. Llangefni Town Council states that the town hall was opened on 10 March 1884. (Note: An article "Newyddion Cymreig – Llangefni" in Y Llan (p. 6) on 14 March 1884 says "it was mentioned some time ago about a hall built in our town by Sir Richard Bulkeley, Baron Hill. It is a beautiful room, one hundred feet long, and forty five feet wide. The room accommodates nearly two thousand people, and under it there are various sites for the traders, which are already laid out... The building will undoubtedly be a great asset to Llangefni. On Monday, the 10th of this month, the opening meeting of the Independents' eisteddfod was held, in the form of a concert... Eleazar Williams, rector of the place, had a numerous assembly, and a good recital.") In 1895, it became the administrative centre for Llangefni Urban District Council, continuing to be so until 1974 when local authority reorganisation led to the Shire Hall in Llangefni being re-designated the "Borough Council Offices" and becoming the headquarters of the new Ynys Mon Borough Council. At county level Anglesey was incorporated into Gwynedd in 1974 and the county council headquarters moved to Caernarfon. Brand new council offices were built at Llangefni in the 1990s for the new unitary authority, Isle of Anglesey County Council.

On 17 November 1992 the building was gutted by fire, with the roof and the whole interior severely damaged. Repairs cost £1 million and took three years to complete. The building remained largely unused, in 2004 the county council invited declarations of interest from private developers to use the building more effectively. By 2008 the building was costing the council £30,000 a year. A planning application was considered to introduce retail units and new offices to the building. In 2012 £170,000 was secured to refurbish the building, with the intention of it housing Menter Môn and creating 40 jobs for the town centre. In 2015 the newly refurbished town hall won the Community Benefit category of the Wales RICS Awards. It was one of five UK projects nominated for the RICS Awards 2015 Grand Final.
