= Menter Môn =

Social enterprise based in Anglesey, Wales

- Formation: 1995/1996; 30 years ago
- Type: Social enterprise
- Location: Wales
- Region served: Anglesey and Gwynedd; North Wales (minor)
- Chair: Rebecca Colley-Jones
- Website: www.mentermon.com

Menter Môn (Welsh for 'Enterprise Anglesey') is a social enterprise organisation, based in Anglesey (Welsh: Ynys Môn), Wales. It mainly operates in Anglesey and Gwynedd, although some of its programmes and funds extend to other parts of north and west Wales. Menter Môn focuses on delivering local projects, including those specialising in local regeneration, the environment and culture.

Within Menter Môn is Annog (Welsh for 'Encourage'), a trading company which specifically focuses on programmes improving the rural economy.

== Background and history ==
Operationally Menter Môn consists of two companies, Menter Môn Cyf and Annog Cyf. Menter Môn Cyf is a social enterprise development company, while Annog Cyf is its trading company. Menter Môn is a programme and project delivery agent, whose purpose is to design, implement and evaluate public sector programmes, such as those formerly funded by the European Union (EU). Menter Môn Cyf is based at Llangefni Town Hall, Anglesey.

Annog, on the other hand and created in 2000, focuses on delivering projects that specifically supports the rural economy, rather than rural development. Annog delivers projects on the behalf of the private, voluntary and public sectors, and was created by Menter Môn to develop an income to support Menter Môn overall.

While named after Anglesey (Welsh: Ynys Môn), Menter Môn also works in Gwynedd, and sometimes other parts of North Wales and West Wales. Menter Môn's managing director stated Menter Môn now works across four counties in North Wales, those being Anglesey, Gwynedd, Conwy and Denbighshire, through its social enterprise fund. The majority of its activity is centred on Anglesey and Gwynedd.

Menter Môn was started in 1995 as a one-person EU programme manager, for the EU's LEADER, within Anglesey council, and was first incorporated as an independent community-owned limited company in 1996, to support local economic development and to administer European Union rural development programmes. Since its establishment, it had managed more than £50 million in grants from multiple financiers, and has backed 80 business startups annually. Menter Môn has managed to survive, despite similar enterprises, such as Antur Dwyryd Lln in Gwynedd, collapsing.

In 2007, research conducted by Menter Môn, revealed that the red squirrels in Pentraeth forest had limited genetic diversity. A woodland ecologist, described the situation as "worrying", and that additional red squirrels from other parts of Wales would need to be introduced to address the high risk of inbreeding.

In December 2022, Menter Môn partnered with organisations, across the six counties of North Wales, to provide the Croeso Cynnes/Warm Spaces network, to assist in the cost-of-living crisis.

In March 2023, Menter Môn, through its Neges project and Anglesey council, provided free ready meals to community freezers to assist in the cost-of-living crisis. In June 2023, Larder Cymru, run by Menter Môn, participated in an innovative food event at the Senedd building, focusing on sustainable food procurement.

In August 2023, Rebecca Colley-Jones was appointed as Menter Môn's new chair, taking over from Wyn Morgan. Colley-Jones is Menter Môn's first female chair. In October 2023, Menter Môn partly funded the opening of a business support centre in Barmouth.

In November 2023, Menter Môn secured £1.75 million from the UK Government's Shared Prosperity Fund and the Nuclear Decommissioning Authority, to funding community projects on Anglesey, emphasising language, culture, age-friendliness, low-carbon, the environment, and biodiversity. Part of this funding was used to develop a Gwynedd community fund.

== Projects ==
Generally Menter Môn aims to deliver localised projects, with a focus on regeneration, environmental and cultural projects.

Over its existence, Menter Môn has focuses on developing projects in the following areas:

- Business innovation
- Coastal communities
- Community regeneration
- Energy
- Food and agriculture
- Future-planning
- Heritage
- Music and the performing arts
- Natural environment and biodiversity
- Social enterprise
- Tidal energy
- Welsh language and culture
- Youth enterprise

=== List of specific projects ===
Some specific projects of Menter Môn include:

- Arloesi Gwynedd Wledig – Innovation project in Gwynedd
- Arloesi Môn – Innovation project in Anglesey
- Cwlwm Seiriol – Community project in Seiriol, for improving the management of a sustainable local natural environment.
- Menter Iaith Môn – Welsh-language promotion project
- Bocsŵn – Music programme for children and young people in Anglesey
- WiciMôn – Assist Welsh Wikipedia to raise the use of the Welsh language and information relating to Anglesey.
- Theatr Ieunctid Môn – Arts opportunity programme for children and young people in Anglesey.
- Holyhead Hydrogen Hub – Hydrogen supply chain for the Port of Holyhead, part funded by the UK Government.
- Yr Hwb Menter – Enterprise hub
- Afonydd Menai – Response to threat posed by the (invasive) American mink, and protecting the European water vole.
- Morlais Tidal Energy – Tidal energy project, part-funded by the EU, partnering with Isle of Anglesey County Council. It would be the UK's largest tidal energy scheme. The programme also implemented Starlink on South Stack, to address its poor mobile connectivity.
- Llwyddo’n Lleol 2050 – Local entrepreneurship programme for young people in Anglesey and Gwynedd. It was later extended to Ceredigion and Carmarthenshire.
- Tech Tyfu – Vertical farming project in Anglesey and Gwynedd.
- Môn Larder – Local produce promotional programme for local supply chains.
- IIP – Investors in People accreditation support.
- "Made with Wool", with British Wool and Bangor University, to promote Wool as a sustainable and renewable source. The project also created "wool paths" along some bogs in Anglesey.
- Ffiws – Collaborative space scheme
- The Enabling Fund: Rural Economy – Annog-managed rural business scheme in Gwynedd
- FerMôntation – Hydrogen and bacteria-based fermentation scheme to produce food.
- Grymuso Gwynedd – Gwynedd community fund
- Môn a Menai – Green space improvement project in Anglesey and Gwynedd.
- Smart Towns – Rural programme addressing high street degeneration and anti-social behaviour.

=== Past projects ===
Menter Môn was credited with helping the following projects in the past:

- Halen Môn/Anglesey Sea Salt
- Môn Maintenance

=== Assets ===
Menter Môn also developed some assets, in which it leases:

- Llangefni Town Hall redevelopment
- Princes Pier, Menai Bridge
- Cooper Kingdom, Amlwch (Amlwch Port)
- Llys Llewelyn
- In 2008, it owned Castell Aberlleiniog.
