= St Mary's Church, Navan =

St. Mary's Church
- St. Mary's Roman Catholic Church
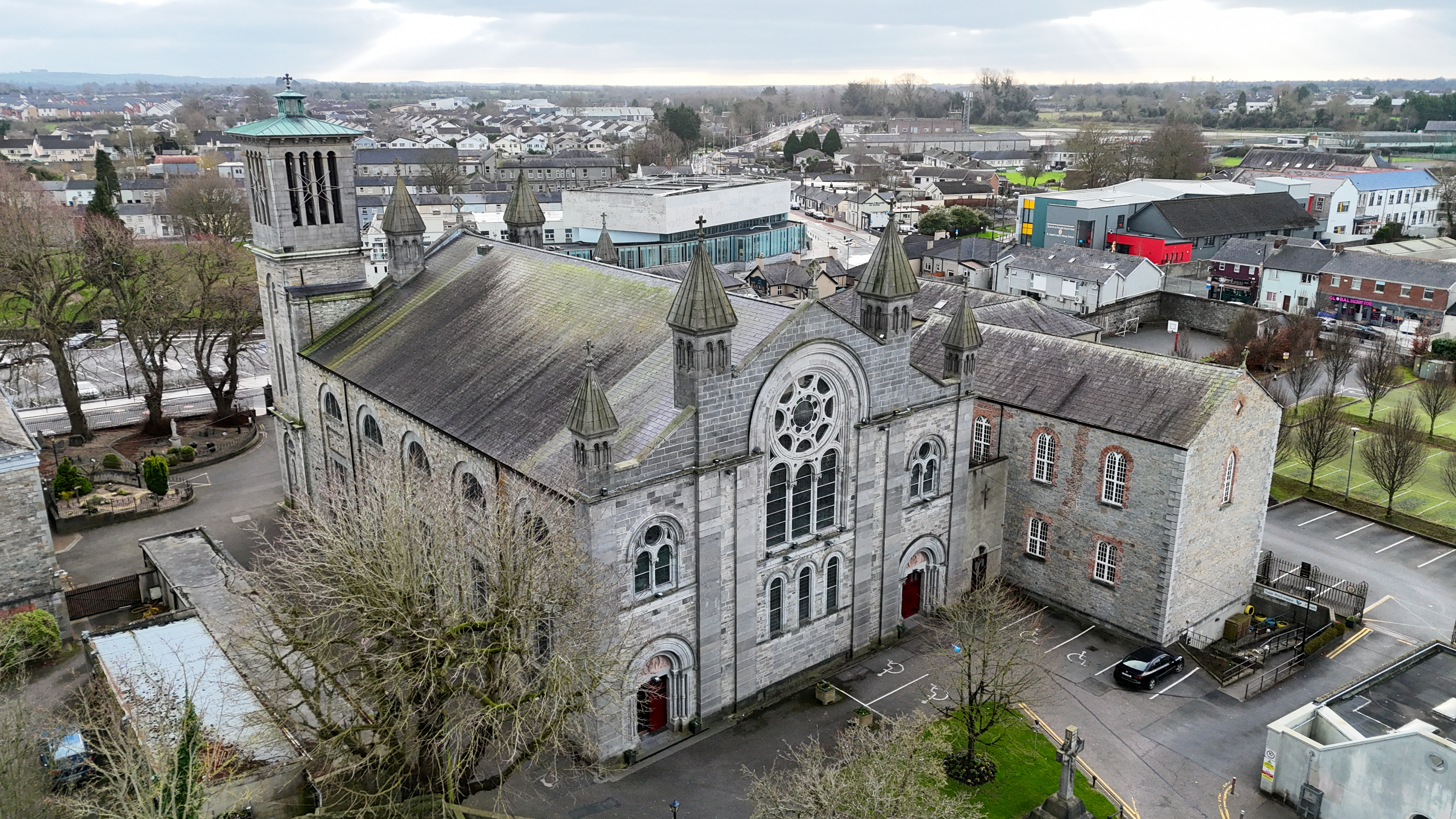
- St Mary's Church in 2025

- Location within Ireland
- 53.65156°N 6.68598°W
- Location: Navan, County Meath
- Country: Ireland
- Denomination: Roman Catholic
- Website: navanparish.ie

History
- Dedication: Mary, mother of Jesus

Architecture
- Years built: 1835–1850

Administration
- Diocese: Meath

St. Mary's Church (Irish: Eaglais Mhuire) in Navan, County Meath is one of two churches that make up the modern-day Parish of Navan in the Diocese of Meath. It was opened in 1839.

== History ==
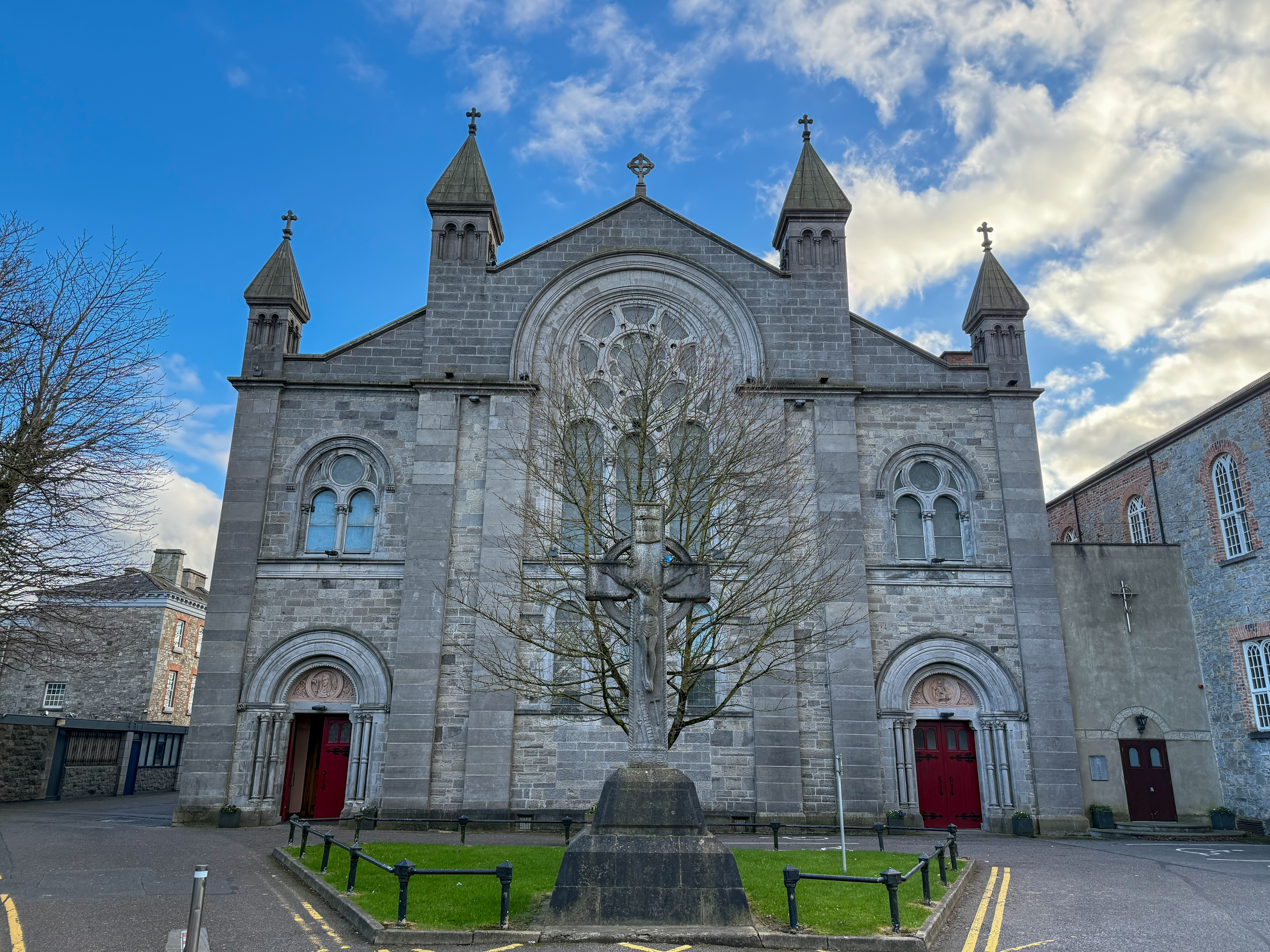
Trimgate Street side

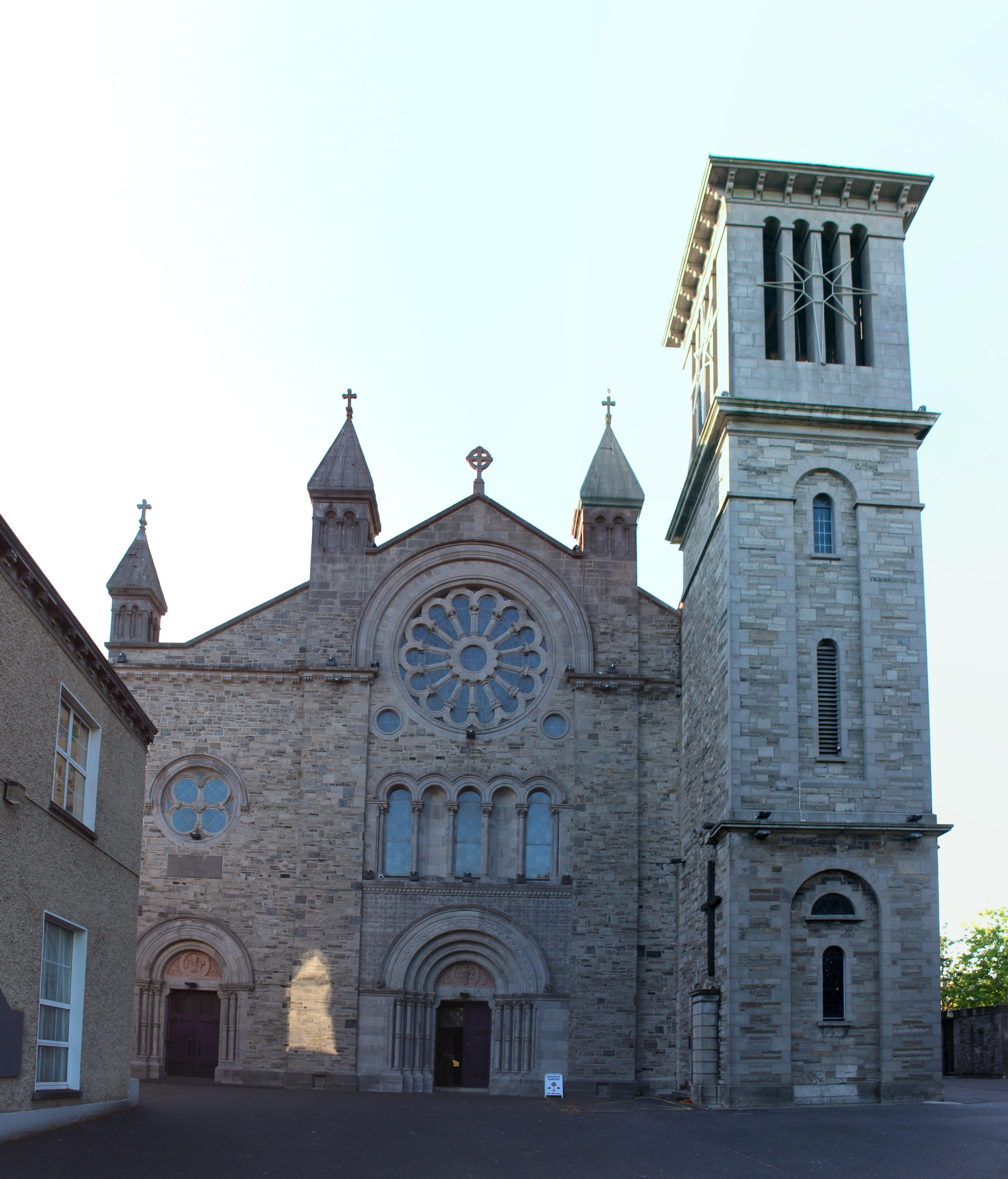
Fair Green side

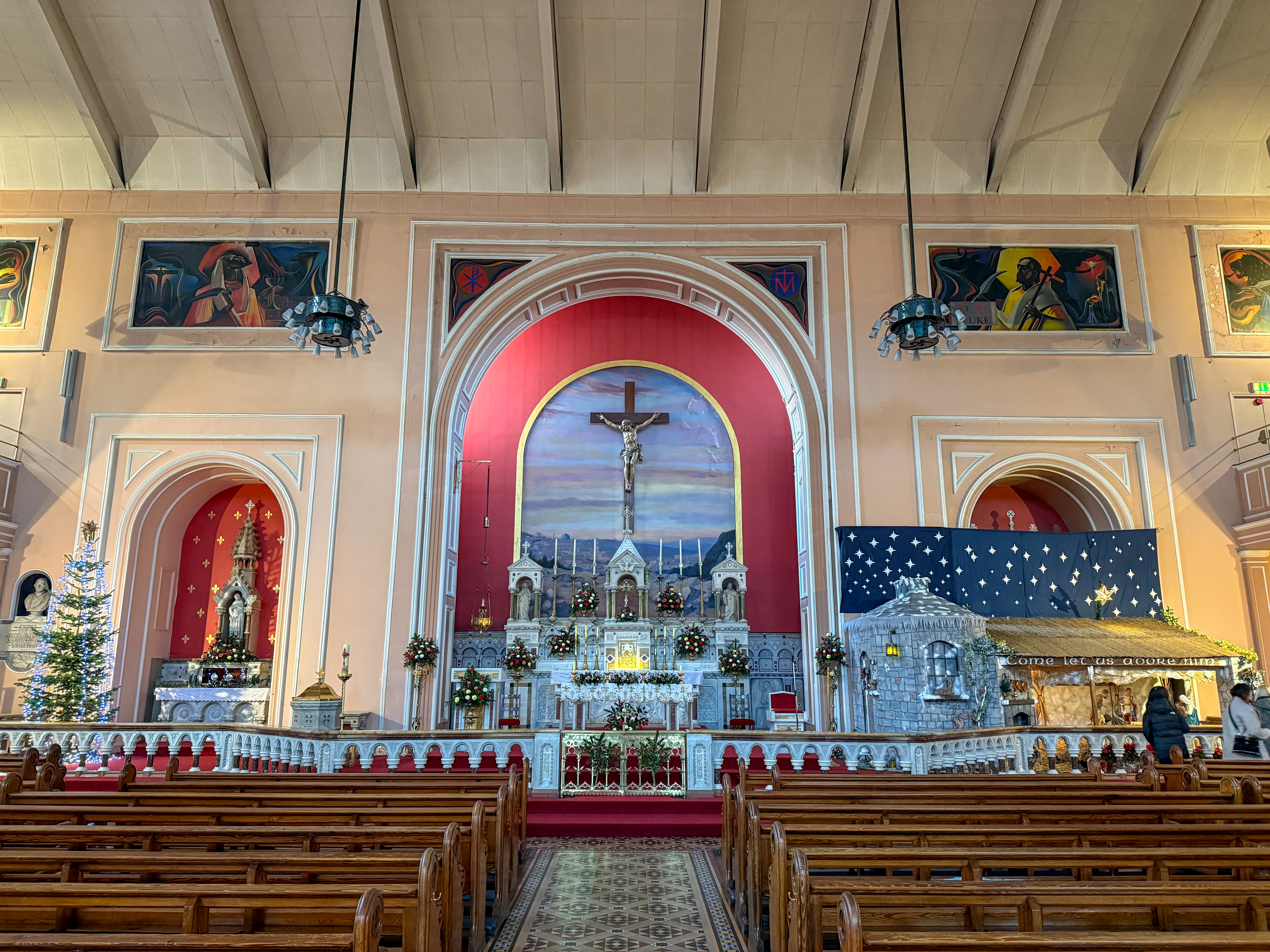
Interior

The modern Navan Parish is made up of five mediaeval parishes: Athlumney, Cannistown, Donaghmore, Dunmoe and Navan. Although cemeteries still survive in these locations, the churches were suppressed in the Penal Laws era, with many surviving simply as derelict buildings.

St. Mary's Church is named after the mediaeval Augustinian abbey which was located on the outskirts of the Parish called St. Mary's. St. Mary's Abbey and its associated granges were suppressed on the orders of King Henry VIII, the English monarch proclaimed King of Ireland, who suppressed religious orders throughout his English and Irish kingdoms, often forcibly, as part of his dispute with the Holy See over its refusal to grant an annulment of his marriage to his first wife, Catherine of Aragon.

The modern St. Mary's was one of many Catholic churches built in Ireland following Catholic Emancipation in 1829, when the last of the Penal Laws was repealed. It is located between Trimgate Street, one of the main streets of the mediaeval town of Navan, and the Fairgreen, with the main entrance facing onto the Fairgreen, where parking is available.

Fr. Eugene O'Reilly decided to build the church along with helping form various schools in the town. The decision to build St. Mary's was taken at a public meeting on 9 September 1834 at which Fr. Eugene O'Reilly P.P. presided. A committee of 34 was formed and it was "resolved that the present chapel is by far too small for the present congregation and that we do forthwith enter on the erection of a new one". It has come down in folklore that Fr. O'Reilly spoke the following or similar words at the meeting: "Why do people go to a theatre? Because they can see and hear everything that passes on the stage. I'll build a church to hold 3000, where everyone can see and hear the priest". Fr. O'Reilly is said to have had a Paris opera house in mind when the new church was designed and to have imitated its dimensions, but this has never been conclusively proven, other than by the rather "theatrical" design of the church. Fr. O'Reilly had studied for the priesthood in Lille, France, returning to Ireland in 1795 to complete his studies in the newly opened Maynooth College. A new theatre had been built in Lille in 1785 and it is possible that this was where Fr. O'Reilly got his inspiration. This theatre was completely destroyed by fire in 1903. The formal opening of St. Mary's took place on Sunday 20 October 1839 at High Mass offered by Bishop Cantwell. The collection on the occasion raised £178. 14s. 6d.

The church itself contains a monument commemorating the fact that it was built with the permission of the major landowner in the area at the time, the Duke of Bedford. The Duke's family, the Russells, were also commemorated until recently in the name of a nearby hotel (since rebuilt and renamed). The local Church of Ireland contains a balcony that was reserved for the duke and his family when they attended services there.

== Church webcam and technology ==
In April 2007, in conjunction with P5tv (Province 5 Television), the parish installed a camera under the organ loft to broadcast mass live to Navan and its environs every day at 10AM on the UPC television cable network. In December 2007, P5tv installed a second encoder to broadcast the video signal to the Parish website.

In July 2008, P5tv created a pressuremat system with an intelligent camera that allows the camera pan tilt and zoom features to be used whenever a priest stood on a mat. P5tv developed this in house with the assistance of their virtual director. P5tv also installed an adoration static camera which displays the Blessed Sacrament continually.

== Bishop is parish priest ==
Navan is one of the two mensal parishes of the diocese of Meath, the other being the Cathedral Parish of Mullingar. The parish priest of Navan is therefore the Bishop of Meath. Bishop Patrick J. Plunkett (1778–1827) and probably Bishop Robert Logan (1827–1830) resided at Navan, but Bishop John Cantwell (1830–1866) established his residence at Mullingar. On the death of Fr. Eugene O'Reilly, Parish Priest of Navan, in 1852, Bishop Cantwell petitioned the Holy See to have Navan as a mensal parish and his request was acceded to the following year. Since the construction of an episcopal palace in Mullingar by Bishop Thomas Nulty (1866–1898) in the late 1870s, the official residence of the Bishop of Meath has been in Mullingar where his cathedral is located. The bishop is represented as parish priest in Navan by an 'administrator' who fulfils all the functions of a parish priest. The current administrator is the Very Reverend Declan Hurley, Adm.

St Mary's contains a famed wooden life-size sculpture of Christ on the Cross, hanging from the back wall behind the reredos. The sculpture is by Edward Smyth, the 19th-century sculptor from County Meath famed for his riverine heads on the Custom House in Dublin

== Other religious buildings nearby ==
The Anglican church in Navan is also called St. Mary's Church and is a short distance away from the Catholic St. Mary's.

Among other religious groups that meet for services in Navan are the Elim Ministries and the Calvary Community Church.
