= Navan Town Hall =

Municipal building in Navan, County Meath, Ireland

- Halla Baile na hUaimhe
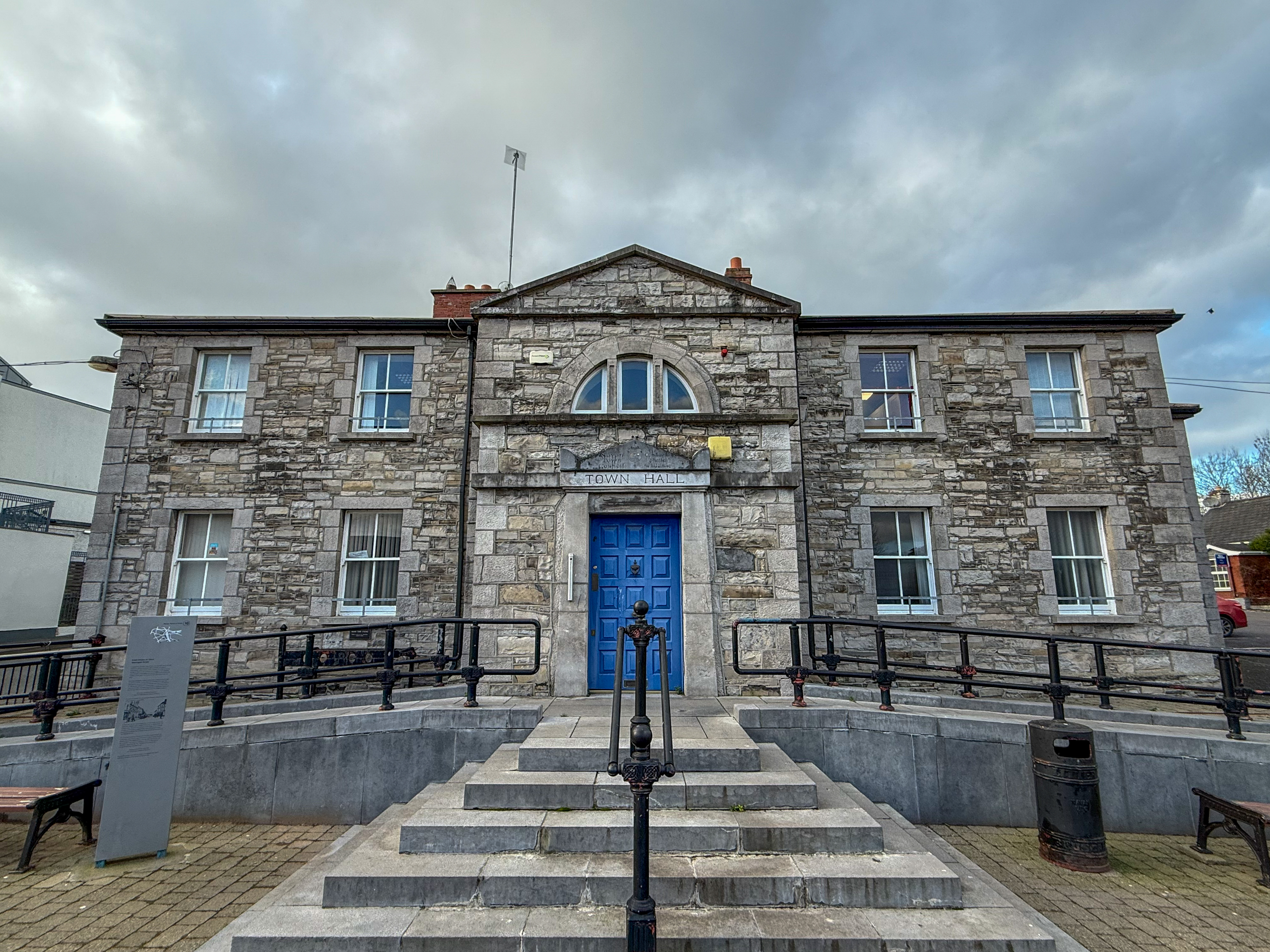
- Navan Town Hall in 2025

- Location within Ireland

General information
- Architectural style: Greek Revival style
- Location: Abbey Road, Navan, Ireland
- Coordinates: 53.6544°N 6.6835°W
- Completed: 1831

Design and construction
- Architect: John Hargrave

Navan Town Hall (Irish: Halla Baile na hUaimhe) is a municipal building in Abbey Road, Navan, County Meath, Ireland. The building, which was commissioned to serve as the local bridewell, became the police barracks, and later became the local seat of government.

== History ==
The first public building in the town was the old courthouse in Ludlow Street which was designed and built by Edward Manning and completed in 1632. After an increase in the transient population of the town, especially on market days, in the early 19th century, followed by severe economic recession in the wake of the Napoleonic Wars, there was a significant increase in the number of civil disturbances in the town. In response civic leaders decided to commission a local bridewell.

The new building was designed by John Hargrave in the Greek Revival style, built in rubble masonry with ashlar stone dressings, and was completed in 1831. The design involved a symmetrical main frontage of five bays facing onto Abbey Road. The central bay, which was slightly projected forward, featured a porch on the ground floor and a Diocletian window on the first floor with a pediment above. The outer bays were fenestrated by sash windows with architraves on both floors. On the southeast side, there was a single-bay, two-storey wing which was projected outwards.

The building was transferred to the management of the Royal Irish Constabulary as a police barracks in accordance with the provisions of the General Prisons (Ireland) Act 1877. It was then handed over to the Garda Síochána in anticipation of the formation of the Irish Free State in 1922, and subsequently continued to operate as a police barracks until the police service moved to a new police station further west along Abbey Road in 1978.

After the building was acquired by Navan Urban District Council in 1983, the council commissioned an extensive programme of refurbishment works before moving into the building. The town stocks were relocated from the courthouse to the town hall at that time. The building continued to be used as the offices of the urban district council until 2002, and subsequently as the offices of the successor town council. However, it ceased to be the local seat of government in 2014, when the council was dissolved and administration of the town was amalgamated with Meath County Council in accordance with the Local Government Reform Act 2014.

A war memorial commemorating the lives of local service personnel who died in the First World War was unveiled in front of the town hall in 2018.
