= Bull Canyon Spring (Riverside County, California) =

Spring in the American state of California

Coordinates: 33°35′22″N 116°33′24″W

Bull Canyon Spring is a spring in Bull Canyon, in the upper reach of Palm Canyon, in Riverside County, California. It is located at an elevation of 5,331 feet / 1,625 meters.
