= Bull River =

Bull River may be:

- Bull River (British Columbia) in British Columbia, Canada
- Bull River (Georgia) in Georgia, U.S.
- Bull River (Montana) in Montana, U.S.
- Bull River (West Virginia) in West Virginia, U.S.
