= The Bull Hotel, Llangefni =

Grade II listed building in Anglesey, UK

Coordinates: 53.2554°N 4.3100°W

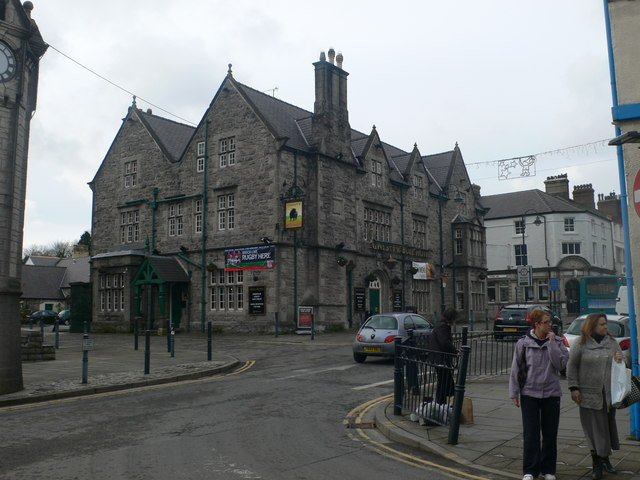
The Bull Hotel

The Bull Hotel is a Grade II-listed building in Llangefni, Anglesey, built during the nineteenth century in a seventeenth-century vernacular style. It replaced an earlier inn built on the same site.

== Background and description ==
The building was constructed around 1850 and replaced a seventeenth-century inn on the same site known as the Pen-y-Bont that had been renamed as the Bull's Head in 1817. The hotel is built in a seventeenth-century vernacular style, faced with limestone rubble and freestone facings, and fitted with a slate roof. The main part of the hotel is a double-depth, three-storey structure with a full-height gabled wing to the right rear to form an L shape. This is abutted by lofted tackrooms and servant's quarters which comprise one wing of the U-shaped range of outbuildings behind the hotel. The opposite side are lofted stables, connected to the tackrooms by a single-storey row of coach-houses.

The entrance faces north and has four bays with a lateral chimney protruding to the left that are partly corbelled over the ground floor. The roof has three gabled dormers over a pedimented, two-storey, rectangular bay window. The other windows are small-paned casements in freestone mullioned and transomed surrounds; the first-floor windows with flat moulded labels.

The hotel was listed on 11 October 1986 by Cadw "as a good, substantially complete example of a Victorian coaching Inn and courtyard range. The Inn is an ambitiously scaled and particularly well-detailed example of neo-vernacular design, prominently sited in the centre of the town, it also forms a group with the adjacent town hall and clock."
