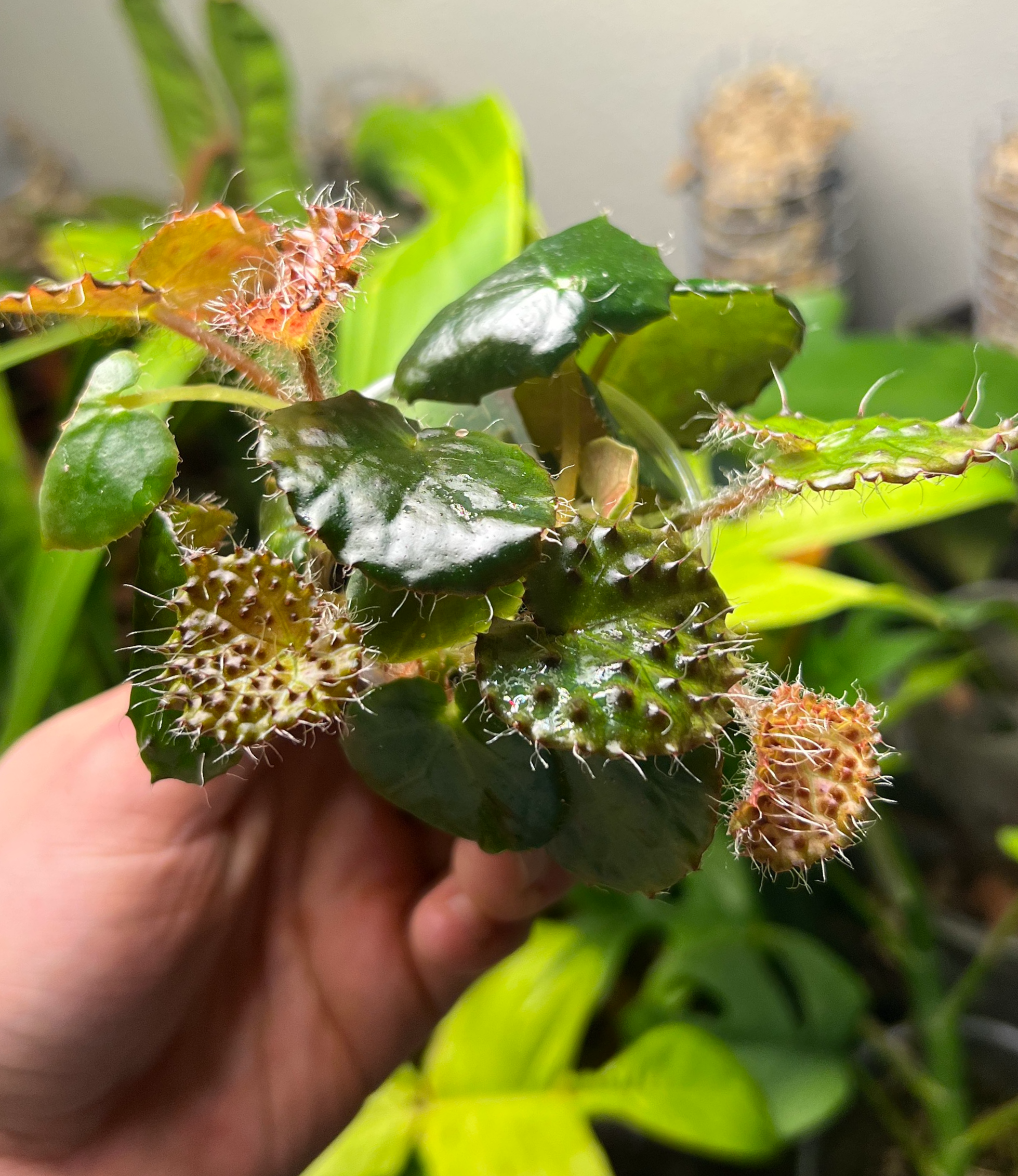
- Begonia ferox grown in cultivation

Scientific classification
- Kingdom: Plantae
- Clade: Tracheophytes
- Clade: Angiosperms
- Clade: Eudicots
- Clade: Rosids
- Order: Cucurbitales
- Family: Begoniaceae
- Genus: Begonia
- Species: B. ferox

Binomial name
- Begonia ferox C.-I Peng & Yan Liu. (2013)

= Begonia ferox =

Species of plant

Begonia ferox is a species of flowering plant in the family Begoniaceae. Begonia ferox has been documented in Guangxi Zhuangzu growing on limestone outcroppings of the forest floor. It has a creeping growth habit, with leaves up to 19 cm (7.5 in) long and 13 cm (5.1 in) wide. When the leaves reach maturity, blackish-brown and hairy bullae with red tips emerge, up to 1.3 cm (0.51 in) tall and 0.6 cm (0.24 in) wide. It flowers from January through May, producing fruit from April through July. Carpellate flowers are pinkish white, while staminate flowers are pinkish yellow, and the fruit is reddish green.

== Gallery ==
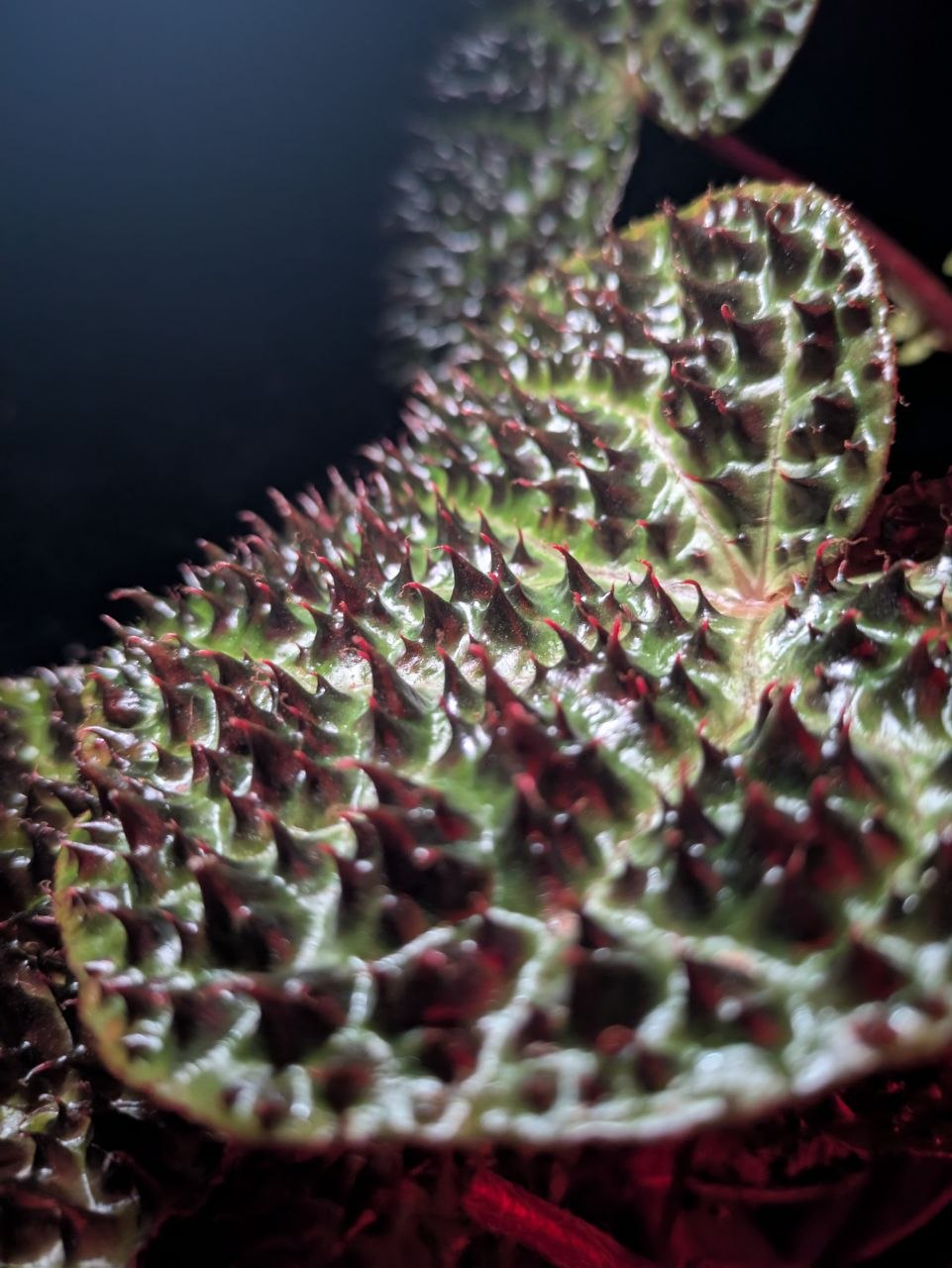
Begonia Rex Ferox (Closeup)
