= Bulla =

Bulla (Latin, 'bubble') may refer to:

== History and archaeology ==
- Bulla (amulet), given to boys in Ancient Rome
- Bulla (seal), in archaeology, an inscribed clay or soft metal token used in ancient times for commercial or legal documentation
- Bulla Felix, an Italian bandit, fl. 205–207 AD

== Medicine and natural science ==
- Bulla (dermatology), large blister
- Bulla, a focal lung pneumatosis, an air pocket in the lung
- Auditory bulla, a hollow bony structure on the skull of many mammals enclosing the ear
- Ethmoid bulla, part of the ethmoid bone of the skull
- Bulla (gastropod), a genus of sea snails

== Places ==
- Bulla, Victoria, Australia
  - Bulla Bridge
- Bulla Island, in the Caspian Sea
- Bulla Regia, an archaeological site in northwestern Tunisia

== Other uses ==
- Bulla cake, a type of Jamaican cake
- Bulla Dairy Foods, an Australian dairy company
- Bulla (Dragon Ball), a fictional character
- A fictional character of Ricky Grover
- Bulla, fictional character portrayed by Mukesh Rishi in the 1998 Indian film Gunda

== See also ==
- Bula (disambiguation)
- Bull (disambiguation)
- Bubble (disambiguation)
- Golden bull, or Bulla Aurea
- Papal bull (Latin bulla, plural bullae), a type of letter or charter issued by a pope
