= The Bull Hotel, Sedbergh =

Hotel in Sedbergh, Cumbria, England

Coordinates: 54.3237°N 2.5275°W

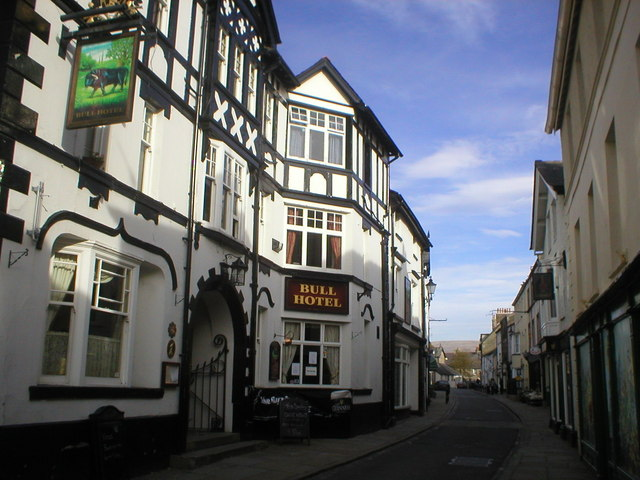

The Bull Hotel, formerly The Black Bull Hotel, is a 17th-century coaching inn in Sedbergh, Cumbria. It is located in a narrow passage parallel with the Main Street of Sedbergh and contains 14 rooms. The inn has been used for conferences, particularly by science associations and groups such as geologists and naturalists since at least the 1880s.
