= Bull (band) =

English indie rock band from York

- Origin: York, England
- Genres: Indie rock
- Years active: 2011–present
- Labels: EMI Records; Young Thugs
- Members: Tom Beer; Holly Beer; Dan Lucas; Kai West; Tom Gabbatiss
- Website: bullband.bandcamp.com

Bull are an English indie rock band from York, England.

Formed in 2011, the band released its debut album, Discover Effortless Living, in March 2021 following a signing with EMI Records.

Their second studio album, Engines of Honey, was released in March 2024.

== History ==
Bull were formed in York in 2011 by vocalist and songwriter Tom Beer and guitarist Dan Lucas.

In July 2020, YorkMix reported that Bull had signed to EMI Records in association with York label Young Thugs, coinciding with the release of their single "Green".

Bull's debut album, Discover Effortless Living, was released on 26 March 2021.

Their second studio album, Engines of Honey, was released on 1 March 2024.

== Style ==
Reviewers have described Bull's music as indie rock and "slacker pop". Flood Magazine included Bull in a feature on a jangle pop revival. In interviews, Beer has cited influences including Pavement, Yo La Tengo and Pixies.

== Critical reception ==
Gigwise and Silent Radio reviewed Discover Effortless Living as drawing on 1990s alternative rock, grunge, and britpop influences.

York Calling wrote that the album ranged stylistically from "60 stoner rock to 90s grunge to upbeat pop rock" and commented on its varied arrangements across 13 tracks.

== Members ==
- Tom Beer (vocals, guitar and otomatone)
- Holly Beer (keyboards, vocals)
- Dan Lucas (guitar, vocals)
- Kai West (bass, vocals)
- Tom Gabbatiss (drums, cymbals and vocals)

== Discography ==
=== Studio albums ===
- Discover Effortless Living (EMI Records / Young Thugs, 26 March 2021)
- Engines of Honey (distributed by AWAL, 1 March 2024)

=== Extended plays ===
- Stuck (EP, 2022)
