= The Bull of Navan =

Coordinates: 53°39′11″N 6°41′02″W

The Bull (official name)
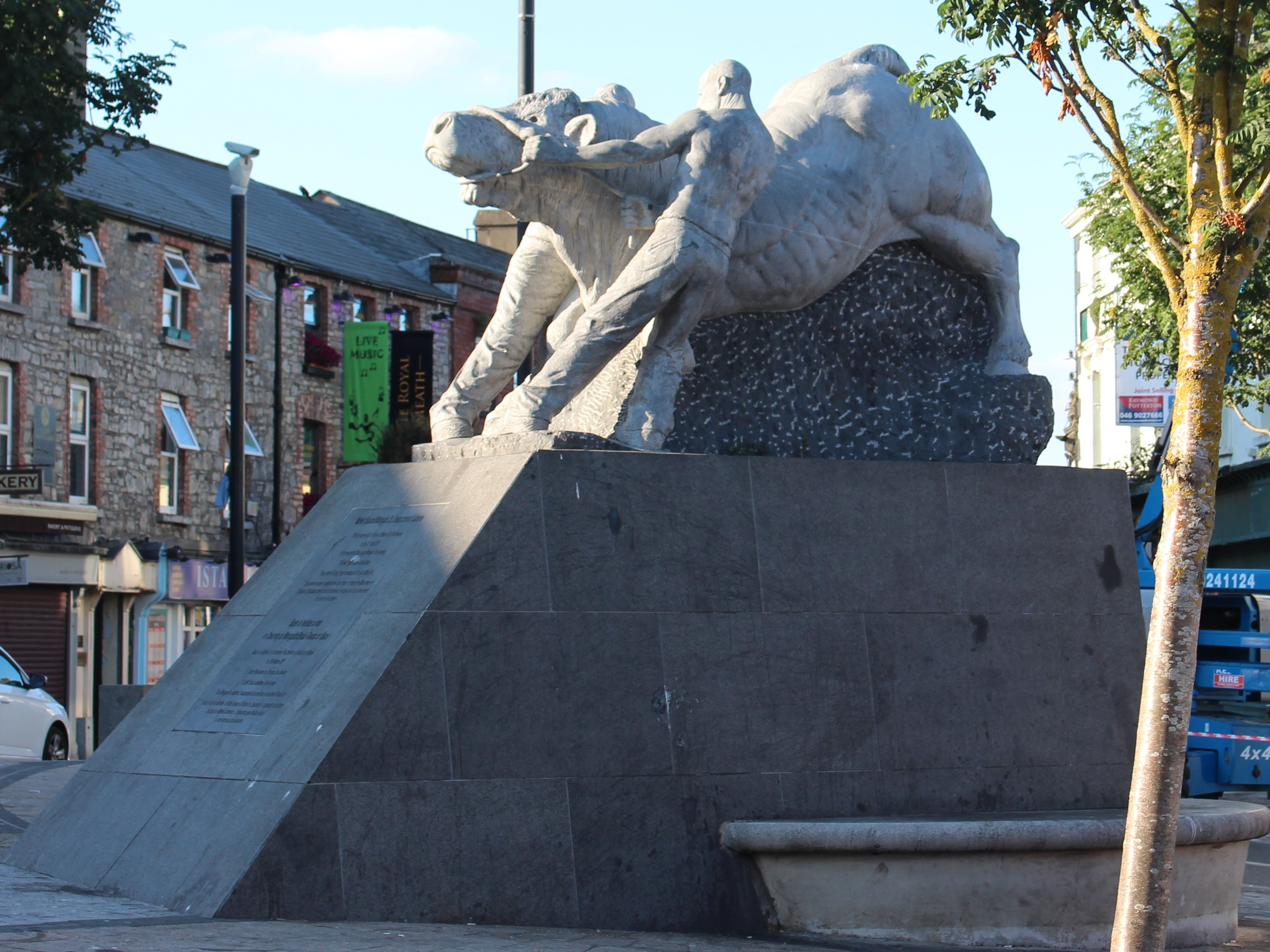
- Interactive map of The Bull (official name)
- Location: Market Square, Navan, County Meath, Ireland
- Designer: Colin Grehan
- Material: Limestone and granite
- Beginning date: 2003
- Completion date: 2011

The Bull of Navan (Irish: Tarbh na hUaimhe) is a prominent stone sculpture in the town of Navan, in County Meath, Ireland. The statue was sculpted by Galway sculptor Colin Grehan and depicts a large bull being restrained by two men. The image of the bull has historic significance for the town of Navan, where many livestock fairs were held.

The sculpture was finally positioned in the Market Square in 2011 following nine years of controversy over the cost of the project and the proposed location. The scope of the project also included a large regeneration of Navan town centre, with the planting of trees and grass, the placing of new lighting at a ground level, and the provision of stone benches.

== Description ==
The body of the Bull is sculpted out of limestone, a rock indigenous to the east of Ireland, and it stands 1.6 meters tall with a weight estimated at 16 tonnes. The bull is both lifelike in terms of appearance and accurate in terms of size, as are the men restraining it. The men are dressed only in trousers and boots. They are muscular and bare-chested, and are likely labourers or vendors from the livestock fairs.

The statue rests on a plinth of black granite at an elevation of approximately 2 meters at its highest point. The whole structure has a total height of between 3.2 and 3.6 meters as it is on a hill. The width of the bull is 0.6m and the plinth measures 2.5m at its base. The statue features in the middle of the market square and is accompanied by stone benches, also made from limestone. The statue sits at the centre of a crossroad with Trimgate street, Watergate street and Ludlow Street, and Navans main road converging in the square. It is traditional in Norman towns that 3 streets converge in the market square. The front of the bull, however, is only visible from the main road, a fact which prompted significant criticism.

== History ==
The image of the bull and its location is significant to the history of Navan. From the 17th century onwards, Navan was an important market town and commercial centre. It was in the market square that livestock fairs were held. On a predetermined day every week, local farmers would sell their animals and other countries produce in the market square. This activity was a significant part of the Navan economy. The town supplied much of the food in Meath and indeed was the corn depot of the County.

The scale of the economic activity in the market square is reflected in this 19th-century editorial of the Meath People, a local paper. Commenting on the state of the locality on market days it reads,

It is a literal fact that from the Commons Road down to the Railway Bridge there are fully two inches of horse manure, saturated hay and sludge of every description, covering the streets from one side to the other to the great enjoyment of pigs and geese.

However, during the late 19th century and early 20th century, Navan's importance in agricultural production declined as the town became industrialised. The market became far less significant in terms of the food supply and eventually was phased out to later be replaced with open space and public toilets in the 1970s. The Bull was commissioned with a view to commemorating the history of the square, which was not otherwise acknowledged in the vicinity.

== Controversy ==
The whole project of The Bull of Navan caused controversy since when it was first proposed in 2002 until the bull's installation in 2011. The bull had been commissioned in 2003 but objections to the statue delayed its completion by 8 years. It was held in storage during this period. The main sources of disagreement were the price of the project, the proposed location for the bull, and the originality of the bull in general. A petition was signed by over 4500 people as part of the "Navan against the Bull" campaign. This campaign was waged by the Anti-Bull Alliance Party chaired by Paddy Pylre and a consortium of local industrialists. Even after the bull was erected, controversy persisted over issues that arose due to its position.

The location of the bull was a major source of the controversy that surrounded the project. The campaign against the bull led by townsman Paddy Pryle particularly objected to the proposed location. Pyrle noted the issue of the crossroad and the fact that the bull could only face in one direction, saying "While it is a fine bit of art, anybody coming up Timmons Hill, which is one of the main entrances into the town, will be entering Navan via the bull's arse. It is one of the craziest things I have seen put up yet." Councillor Shane Cassells defended the location of the bull stating "I am delighted that, after such a long time, it is finally in place. It is a striking feature in the historical heart of the town and I am confident it is going to become a popular meeting place for the people of the town." Others, however, pointed out the safety hazard of the bull being placed in the centre of Navan's night-life district, in close proximity to 3 nightclubs and a number of local pubs. Pryle noted sarcastically that the monument would "keep the casualty (unit) at Navan Hospital open" on account of people climbing it.

Critics suggested the cost of the project could have been better spent on other facilities such as the local hospital. Councillor Cassells, a proponent of the bull, noted however that it had been fully funded by the Irish Government through Per Cent Art Scheme, and thus local rate-payers were not affected. Pryles campaign did not focus on the cost. The final source of controversy was the charge that the bull was not even an original piece of work. Paddy Pyrle noted that the bull was very similar to another sculpture on the Nenagh bypass, also designed by the sculptor Colin Grehan. Pyrle commented that a lot of money had been spent on a piece of art that was a "copy". Councillor Brennan complemented the bull, describing it as a "masterpiece", while Councillor Cassells praised the artist and described his work as a "striking feature". All three points of controversy remain unresolved.

== Timeline of notable events ==
- Jan. 2002 – The anti-Bull Alliance party is formed by a group of local industrialists and is chaired by Paddy Pryle. The party argued for the following 9 years that the project should be scrapped.
- 27 Feb. 2002 – An inflatable bull supported by the Anti-Bull Alliance party floats away on the river Boyne during St. Patrick's Day celebrations.
- 26 March 2011 – A fake bull used as the mascot of the Dunderry Fair was placed on the granite plinth, much to the confusion of locals. It turned out to be a publicity stunt.
- 20 April 2011 – The real limestone sculpture was placed on the plinth and was officially revealed by the town's Lord Mayor.
- 9 April 2013 – As part of a yarnbombing campaign, the Bull of Navan is dressed in various bright materials by students of Loreto school.
