= The Bull Hotel, Peterborough =

Hotel in Westgate, Cambridgeshire, England

Coordinates: 52°34′29″N 0°14′33″W

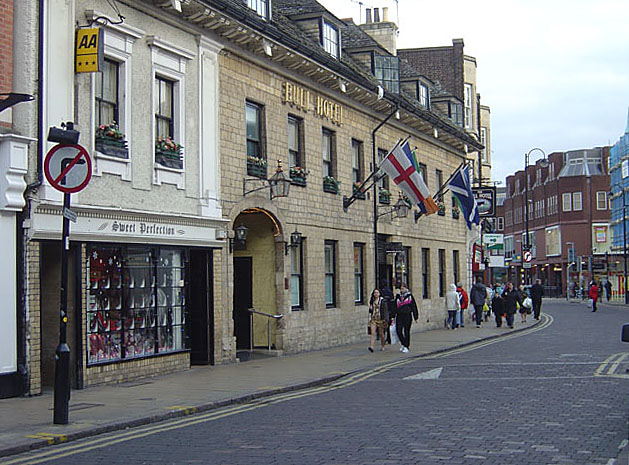

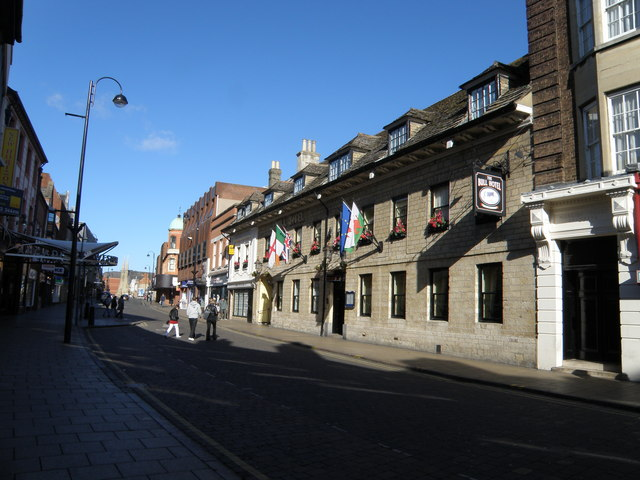

The Bull Hotel is a 17th-century AA 4-star hotel in the Westgate neighbourhood of Peterborough, Cambridgeshire, opposite the Queensgate shopping centre. The Bull Hotel, a Grade II listed building, is the premier hotel in Peterborough, and is the only AA recognised 4 star hotel in the city centre. It has served as a notable conference location for middle England, with a capacity of 250. The hotel has 118 rooms and is served by The Brasserie and the Pastroudis Bar and Cafe.
