= Bulls =

Bulls may refer to:

- The plural of bull, an adult male bovine
- Bulls, New Zealand, a small town in the Rangitikei District

== Sports ==
- Bucking bull, used in the sport of bull riding
- Bulls (rugby union), a South African rugby union franchise operated by the Blue Bulls
- Bulls (X-League), an American football team in Asaka, Saitama, Japan
- Belfast Bulls, a former American football team in Northern Ireland
- Belleville Bulls, a junior ice hockey team in Ontario, Canada
- Birmingham Bulls (American football), an American football team in the UK
- Birmingham Bulls (ECHL), a defunct American ice hockey team from the East Coast Hockey League
- Birmingham Bulls (WHA), a defunct American ice hockey team from the World Hockey Association and Central Hockey League
- Birmingham Bulldogs or Birmingham Bulls, a British rugby league team
- Bradford Bulls, a rugby league club in Bradford, England
- Buffalo Bulls, the sports teams of the University at Buffalo
- Buffalo Bulls football, college football team from Buffalo, New York
- Buffalo Bulls men's basketball, men's basketball team from Buffalo, New York
- Canterbury Bulls, a rugby league team in Christchurch, New Zealand
- Chicago Bulls, a National Basketball Association team in Chicago, Illinois
- Dundalk Bulls, an ice hockey team from Dundalk, Ireland
- Durham Bulls, a minor league baseball team in Durham, North Carolina, United States
- Gombe Bulls, a Nigerian basketball team
- Jacksonville Bulls, a defunct American football team
- Kapfenberg Bulls, a basketball team in Austria
- Lethbridge Bulls, baseball team in the Western Canadian Baseball League
- Louisville Bulls, a Mid Continental Football League team in Louisville, Kentucky
- Pittsburgh Bulls, a defunct lacrosse team in the U.S. state of Pennsylvania
- Queensland Bulls, an Australian cricket team
- Bulls, the nickname of Spain's national Australian rules football team
- Red Bull (Toro Rojo), nickname of Pichincha de Potosí, a Bolivian basketball team
- South Florida Bulls, the sports teams of the University of South Florida
- Windy City Bulls, a basketball team in Hoffman Estates, Illinois, United States
- Zhejiang Golden Bulls, a Chinese basketball team in the CBA

== See also ==
- Blue Bulls, a rugby union club based in Pretoria, South Africa
- Bulldog
- Bulls Gap, Tennessee, a town in the United States
- The running of the bulls
- Bull (disambiguation)
