= Vandeventer Flat =

Flat in Riverside County, California, U.S.

Coordinates: 33°33′02″N 116°32′02″W

Vandeventer Flat is a flat in Riverside County, California. It lies at the elevation, 4,636 feet / 1,413 meters between the San Jacinto Mountains and Santa Rosa Mountains.

    This area was named for Frank Vandeventer, who came into the area around 1866 and established a ranch. He married the daughter of the Chief of the Santa Rosa Indians and had two sons, John and Charlie. 
    In 1909, the Bureau of Land Management found the land belonged to the Santa Rosa Indians and returned it to them. It remains part of the Santa Rosa Indian Reservation.
