= Munthe =

Munthe is a surname, mainly used in Scandinavia. Notable people with the surname include:

- Adolph Frederik Munthe (1817–1884), Norwegian military officer and government official
- Anna Munthe-Norstedt (1854–1936), Swedish painter
- Audun Munthe-Kaas Hierman (1892–1975), Norwegian newspaper editor and novelist
- Axel Munthe (1857–1949), Swedish-born physician and psychiatrist
- Carl Oscar Munthe (1861–1952), Norwegian military officer and historian
- Christopher Morgenstierne Munthe (1875–1939), Norwegian genealogist
- Gerhard Munthe (1849–1929), Norwegian painter and illustrator
- Gustaf Munthe (1896–1962), Swedish writer, art historian and art teacher
- Hans Munthe-Kaas (born 1961), Norwegian mathematician at the University of Bergen
- Hartvig Andreas Munthe (1845–1905), Norwegian military officer, engineer and genealogist.
- Henrik Munthe (1860–1958), Swedish geologist
- Herman Munthe-Kaas (1890–1977), Norwegian architect
- Holm Hansen Munthe (1848–1898), Norwegian architect
- Hugo Munthe-Kaas (1922–2012), Norwegian intelligence agent and resistance fighter during World War II
- Johan Munthe Cappelen (1884–1962), Norwegian legal scholar and judge
- Johan Wilhelm Normann Munthe (1864–1935) was born in Bergen, Norway. After a military education in the cavalry, he emigrated to China
- Lagertha Munthe (1888–1984), Norwegian painter
- Ludvig Munthe (1841–1896), Norwegian-born, German landscape painter
- Malcolm Munthe (1910–1995), British soldier, writer and curator
- Margrethe Munthe (1860–1931), Norwegian teacher, children's writer, songwriter and playwright
- Otto Hjersing Munthe-Kaas (1883–1981), Norwegian politician, businessman and military officer
- Preben Munthe (1922–2013), Norwegian economist
- Wilhelm Munthe (1883–1965), Norwegian librarian
- Leonardus Valentin von Munthe (1940-2018), Norwegian-born, Dutch scientist at Philips

== See also ==
- Munthe af Morgenstierne (noble family), Danish and a Norwegian noble family living in Norway and the Netherlands
