= Iver Leganger =

Norwegian priest and author

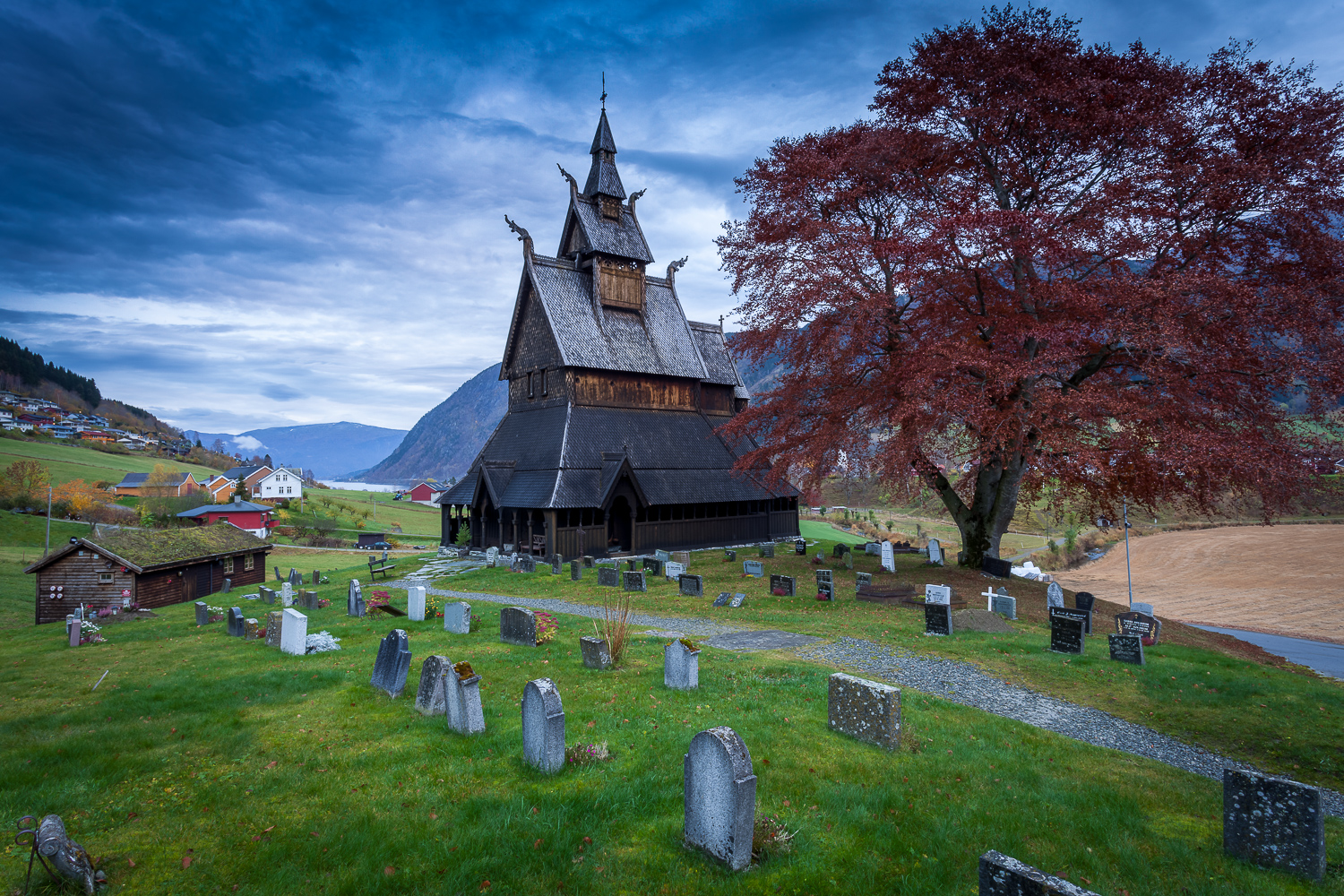
Hopperstad Stave Church in Vik

Iver Erikssøn Leganger (February 26, 1629– April 2, 1702) was a Norwegian priest and author.

He was born at Leikanger in Nordre Bergenhus, Norway and adopted the Danish spelling "Leganger" as a surname. He was the son of provost Erik Iverssøn Nordal (1591–1658) and Karen Nilsdatter Arctander Werner (1595–1634). He attended the Bergen Cathedral School. He took his baccalaureate at the University of Copenhagen in 1648. He subsequently had studied in Germany and the Netherlands. Leganger first worked during 1656 as personnel chaplain for his father in Leikanger. Leganger was priest at Vik Church from 1657 and dean in the Sogn prosti from 1668. He became the owner of several farms in Vik and elsewhere in Sogn.

Leganger was also a historical and topographical author. Leganger had traveled in his youth extensively in Denmark, Germany and the Netherlands. Many of his cadastre surveys and maps are deposited at the library of the University of Trondheim. He is particularly known for his historical and topographical descriptions of Sogn written largely in Latin, Circa brevissimam Sogniæ chorographiam. Leganger also compiled a theological dissertation in Latin, Simplicissima Textus Prophetici expositio, Esaiæ LV. 6–7 (1692), regarding the writings of the prophet Isaiah. At the Hopperstad Stave Church there is a plaque (with text in Latin) memorializing Leganger on a church wall.

== Personal life ==
He was married twice. In 1659, he married Maren Berthelsdatter Glad (1614–1665). In 1667, after the death of his first wife, he married Anna Pedersdatter Finde (1645–1728). His descendants included the artist Gerhard Munthe, historian Hartvig Andreas Munthe, writer Margrethe Munthe and military officer Carl Oscar Munthe.
