= Edvard Bull =

Edvard Bull may refer to:

- Edvard Bull, Sr. (1881–1932), Norwegian historian and politician
- Edvard Bull, Jr. (1914–1986), Norwegian historian
- Edvard Isak Hambro Bull (1845–1925), Norwegian physician
- Edvard Hagerup Bull (1855–1938), Norwegian judge and politician
- Edvard Hagerup Bull (composer) (1922–2012), Norwegian composer
