= Theodor Bull =

Norwegian businessman and genealogist (1870–1958)

- Born: 1870; Kristiana
- Died: 1958 (aged 87–88)
- Occupations: Businessperson and Genealogist

Theodor Bull (1870 – 1958) was a Norwegian businessperson and genealogist.

He was born in Kristiana (later renamed Oslo) as a son of medical doctor Edvard Isak Hambro Bull (1845–1925). He was a brother of theatre director Johan Peter Bull, historian and politician Edvard Bull and literary professor Francis Bull. Through Edvard Bull he was the uncle of historian Edvard Bull. He was also a nephew of military officer Karl Sigwald Johannes Bull, grandnephew of Anders Sandøe Ørsted Bull, great-grandson of Georg Jacob Bull and great-great-grandson of Chief Justice Johan Randulf Bull.

In his professional career he worked as a wholesaler. He also published several genealogical works, and was the chairman of the Norwegian Genealogical Society from 1943 to 1952. In 1952, he was created an honorary member.

Party political offices
Preceded by Sigurd Segelcke Meidell	Chairman of the Norwegian Genealogical Society; 1943–1952	Succeeded by Wilhelm Munthe
