= Edvard Bull Sr. =

Norwegian historian and politician (1881–1932)

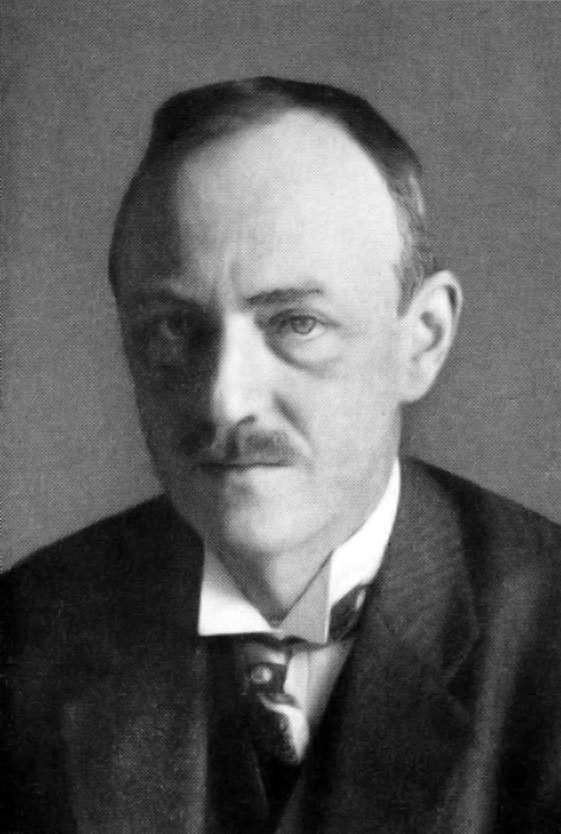

Minister of Foreign Affairs
- In office 28 January 1928 – 15 February 1928
- Prime Minister: Christopher Hornsrud
- Preceded by: Ivar Lykke
- Succeeded by: Johan Ludwig Mowinckel

Personal details
- Born: 4 December 1881 Kristiania, Norway
- Died: 26 August 1932 (aged 50) Oslo, Norway
- Party: Labour
- Spouse: Lucie Juliane Antonette Voss
- Children: Edvard Bull Jr.
- Parent(s): Edvard Isak Hambro Bull; Ida Marie Sofie Paludan
- Education: University of Kristiania
- Profession: Historian

Edvard Bull (4 December 1881 – 26 August 1932) was a Norwegian historian and politician for the Labour Party. He took the doctorate in 1912 and became a professor at the University of Kristiania in 1917, and is known for writings on a broad range of subjects. In addition to his academic work, he is known for his work on Norsk biografisk leksikon. His Marxist leanings inspired him to take up a parallel political career, in the Labour Party. Situated on the radical wing in the 1910s, he was among the architects as the Labour Party denounced the Twenty-one Conditions in 1923 and reunited with the social democrats in 1927. He was the deputy party leader from 1923 to 1932, and served as Norwegian Minister of Foreign Affairs in Hornsrud's short-lived cabinet in 1928.

== Early life ==
He was born on 4 December 1881, in Kristiania as the son of chief physician Edvard Isak Hambro Bull (1845–1925) and his wife Ida Marie Sofie Paludan (1861–1957). He was a brother of theatre director Johan Peter Bull, literary professor Francis Bull and genealogist Theodor Bull. He was also a nephew of military officer Karl Sigwald Johannes Bull, grandnephew of Anders Sandøe Ørsted Bull, great-grandson of Georg Jacob Bull and great-great-grandson of Chief Justice Johan Randulf Bull.

In July 1909, he married Lucie Juliane Antonette Voss (1886–1970). Their son Edvard Bull, Jr. became a notable historian.

== Academic career ==
Bull finished his secondary education in 1899, and studied in classical philology, geography and history at the University of Kristiania. He graduated in 1906 with the cand.mag. degree—by that time he had already published his first academic work. A study trip in Germany and France from 1906 to 1907 spurred his interest of medieval Catholicism. He planned on writing a larger work incorporating church history. He released the paper Bods- og skriftevæsenet i den norske kirke i middelalderen in 1909, and expanded upon this work to publish his doctoral thesis Folk og kirke i middelalderen. Studier til Norges historie in 1912. The work earned him the dr.philos. degree. He had been employed as a research fellow at the University of Kristiania since 1910, and became a lecturer in 1913. In 1917, he succeeded the deceased Ernst Sars as a professor.

Although he wrote several publications on miscellaneous European history, his main contribution was on Norwegian history. His main work in the field, volume two of Det norske folks liv og historie, was published as late as 1931. The study of old agricultural societies also led him on a path of local history. In 1914 and 1918 he published the two-volume Akers historie, on the history of Aker, and two volumes of Kristianias historie, on Oslo, followed later. Bull was also known as a co-editor of the biographical dictionary Norsk biografisk leksikon, the first volume of which was released by the publishing house Aschehoug in 1923. Bull was well known at Aschehoug, having formerly contributed to its periodical Samtiden. Long-time Samtiden editor Gerhard Gran was the second co-editor, the third was Anders Krogvig. Following the early deaths of Gran and Krogvig, Einar Jansen was brought in to assist Bull. Bull was also a consultant for the Norwegian Nobel Committee from 1914 to 1918. From 1927 to 1932, he chaired the Norwegian Historical Association.

Despite influences from Karl Lamprecht and Werner Sombart, Bull clearly drew most of his inspiration from Karl Marx' historical materialism. Publications in this vein include Karl Marx (1918) and Den russiske arbeider- og bonderevolution (1922). He also wrote purely political articles and pamphlets.

== Political career ==
While studying, Bull became acquainted with radical politicians like Emil Stang, Jr., Jakob Friis and Kyrre Grepp. He became active in the Norwegian Labour Party around 1915, and was a driving force behind the molding of the Labour Party into a revolutionary workers' party towards the end of the 1910s. He was known both as a party ideologist and speaker, editing the party magazine Det tyvende Aarhundrede from 1918 to 1920 and 1927 to 1928, but also as a day-to-day politician, serving on the school board of Kristiania from 1916 to 1925 and as a member of the city council from 1919 to 1925.

In 1919, the Labour Party joined the Third Communist International. Although the revolutionary wing had taken control of the party at the 1918 national convention, dissent soon surfaced. Moderates broke out to form the Social Democratic Labour Party of Norway in 1921. The main contention surrounded the possible adaption of the Twenty-one Conditions, which was demanded by Comintern members. Bull was a staunch opponent of the Twenty-one Conditions, and following a resolution at the February 1923 national convention, the Labour Party left the Comintern. In the same year Bull was selected as deputy party leader, a position he held until his death. The Soviet-friendly Communist Party was then formed by splinters, while the road was open for a reconciliation with the Social Democratic Labour Party. Bull helped engineer the reunion between the two parties in 1927. In the same year, Labour became the largest party in the general election. Bull was never elected to Parliament, but when Christopher Hornsrud formed the first ever socialist cabinet in Norway, Bull was appointed as Minister of Foreign Affairs. However, the cabinet only lasted from 28 January to 15 February, being defeated by the other parliamentary parties on a vote of no confidence. He was both preceded and succeeded by people who were also Prime Ministers; Ivar Lykke and Johan Ludwig Mowinckel.

This defeat pushed the Labour Party in a revolutionary direction once again. Bull was among the writers of the party manifesto for the 1930 general election, which was more radical. However, this tactic caused a significant loss in the election. Historians generally agree that from this point, the Labour Party decisively drifted away from the revolutionary rhetoric and policies. Ole Colbjørnsen emerged as the new party ideologist, writing En norsk treårsplan in 1933 together with Axel Sømme, a program for turning Labour into a social democratic party. Labour politicians formed a cabinet again in 1935, and more or less held power until 1965, except for the war years 1940 to 1945 when Germany occupied Norway as well as a month in 1963, when a right-winged cabinet held office.

== Death ==
Bull, however, would not live to see any of this, as he died from a brain tumor on 26 August 1932, aged 50. This meant that he did not release further volumes of Det norske folks liv og historie, as he had planned. Volume three of Kristianias historie was underway, but was not finished. V. Sønstevold completed and published it in 1937.

Political offices
Preceded by Ivar Lykke	Norwegian Minister of Foreign Affairs; January 1928–February 1928	Succeeded by Johan Ludwig Mowinckel
