= Francis Bull =

Norwegian historian and editor (1887–1974)

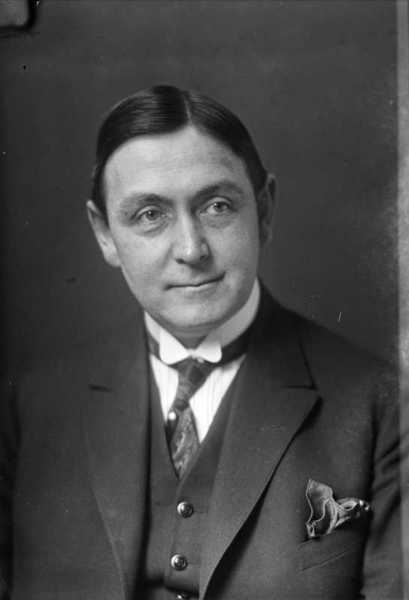
- Bull in 1925
- Born: 4 October 1887; Kristiania, Norway
- Died: 4 July 1974 (aged 86)
- Occupation: Literary historian
- Relatives: Johan Peter Bull (brother); Edvard Bull (brother); Theodor Bull (brother)
- Awards: Order of St Olav

Francis Bull (4 October 1887 – 4 July 1974) was a Norwegian literary historian, professor at the University of Oslo for more than thirty years, essayist and speaker, and magazine editor.

== Early and personal life ==
Bull was born on 4 October 1887, in Kristiania, the son of medical doctor Edvard Isak Hambro Bull (1845–1925) and Ida Marie Sofie Paludan (1861–1957). He was brother to theatre director Johan Peter Bull, historian and politician Edvard Bull and genealogist Theodor Bull. Through Edvard Bull he was the uncle of historian Edvard Bull. He was also nephew to military officer Karl Sigwald Johannes Bull, grandnephew to Anders Sandøe Ørsted Bull, great-grandson to Georg Jacob Bull and great-great-grandson to Chief Justice Johan Randulf Bull.

In June 1924, he married Ingrid Berntsen (1896–1976).

== Career ==
Bull finished his secondary education and enrolled at the University of Oslo, mainly being tutored by Gerhard Gran. As a student Bull wrote the monographs Conrad Nicolai Schwach (1908) and Bjørnson og Sverige (published 1911). The last work earned him the cand.philol. degree. His doctoral dissertation of 1916 was titled Fra Holberg til Nordahl Brun.

Bull was appointed professor in Nordic literature at the University of Oslo in 1920, succeeding the aging Gerhard Gran. In addition to lecturing he co-edited the literary history Norsk litteraturhistorie (four volumes, 1924–1937). He worked on Norsk litteraturhistorie for many years, and as a byproduct of this endeavor he wrote hundreds of entries in the biographical dictionary Norsk biografisk leksikon, of which Gerhard Gran and Edvard Bull were two of the editors-in-chief.

Bull was editor-in-chief of the journal Edda from 1925 to 1960. He was chairman of the board of Gyldendal Norsk Forlag from 1925 to 1968, and a board member of the National Theatre from 1922 to 1956, with the exception of the years 1941 to 1945. Norway was invaded and occupied by Nazi Germany in 1940, and because the National Theatre board did not abide by the directions from the Nazi government, Bull, along with board members publisher Harald Grieg and banker Johannes Sejersted Bødtker, was arrested in 1941. Bull spent three years in a concentration camp, Grini. As he had an excellent memory, he was able to continue his lecturing in prison, by holding secret lectures for co-prisoners. Due to this, Grini was nicknamed "the People's University" by some. A collection of these lectures was published as Tretten taler på Grini in 1945. Bull won recognition for this, and was a popular public speaker and lecturer after the war.

Bull was chairman of the Norwegian Academy of Science and Letters several times between 1941 and 1957, again except for 1941–1945. He held an honorary degree at Aarhus University from 1946, and was decorated as a Commander with Star of the Royal Norwegian Order of St. Olav in 1957. He retired as a professor in 1957, and died on 4 July 1974, aged 86, in Hørsholm, Denmark.
