= Hartvig Andreas Munthe =

Norwegian military officer, engineer and genealogist

- Born: 9 December 1845; Elverum, Norway
- Died: 17 June 1905 (aged 59); Kristiania, Norway
- Education: Norwegian Military Academy
- Spouse: Jeanette Camilla Kristoffersen
- Children: Christopher Morgenstierne Munthe
- Relatives: Christopher Pavels Munthe
- Military career
- Allegiance: Norway
- Branch: Norwegian Army
- Rank: Colonel
- Unit: Engineer Corps
- Other work: Military officer, engineer and genealogist

Hartvig Andreas Munthe (9 December 1845 – 17 June 1905) was a Norwegian military officer, engineer and genealogist.

== Personal life ==
He was born in Elverum as the son of physician Christopher Pavels Munthe (1816–1884). He was an older brother of painter Gerhard Munthe, writer Margrethe Munthe and historian and military officer Carl Oscar Munthe. He was also a nephew of historian and cartographer Gerhard Munthe and an uncle of librarian Wilhelm Munthe and painter Lagertha Munthe. Through his mother he was a nephew of Andreas Leigh Aabel and Oluf Andreas Aabel, and a first cousin of Hauk Aabel.

In May 1874 he married Jeanette Camilla Kristoffersen (1848–1923). He was the father of genealogist Christopher Morgenstierne Munthe.

== Career ==
His main career was with the military. After attending the Norwegian Military Academy, he rose through the ranks; becoming premier lieutenant in the Norwegian Army in 1874 and second lieutenant in the Engineer Corps in 1875. He was the fortress engineer of Fredrikstad Fortress from 1883 to 1886 and Oscarsborg Fortress from 1886 to 1888. He became premier lieutenant of the Engineer Corps in 1888, and then captain in 1889 and lieutenant colonel in 1897. Since 1900 he was an aide-de-camp of King Oscar II of Sweden and Norway, and in March 1905 he reached the rank of colonel. On 7 June 1905, the Norwegian Parliament ratified a motion by Prime Minister Christian Michelsen to depose King Oscar, essentially ending the Union between Sweden and Norway. This was confirmed by the Negotiations in Karlstad and the overwhelming Norwegian union dissolution referendum of 1905, but Hartvig Andreas Munthe lived to see neither of these as he died already on 17 June 1905 in Kristiania.

As a genealogist, Munthe was noted for his work on his own lineage, Efterretninger om Familien Munthe i ældre og nyere tid, released in two volumes in 1883 and 1888 and described by Einar Jansen as a "pioneer work". A work about related families—Aabel, Leigh og Pavels, slægsthistoriske Optegnelser—came in 1903. Munthe was a member of the board of the Dano-Norwegian genealogical society Samfundet for dansk-norsk Genealogi og Personalhistorie from 1902 to his death. The organization became a predecessor of the Norwegian Genealogical Society, of which his son was a co-founder in 1926. Munthe also took the initiative to a description of his native Elverum. The work was published posthumously, completed by Stian Herlofsen Finne-Grønn.
