= Munthe af Morgenstierne family =

Munthe af Morgenstierne
- Nobility
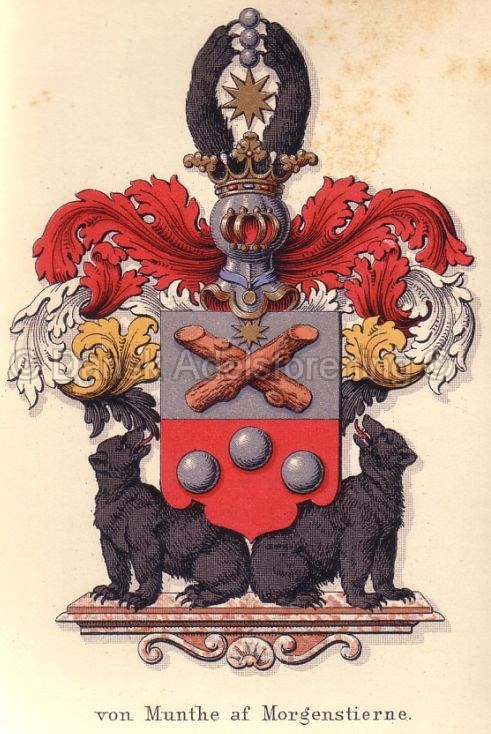
- Coat of arms of von Munthe af Morgenstierne family
- Country: Norway; Denmark the Netherlands
- Place of origin: Fron
- Founded: 19 December 1755
- Founder: Bredo Munthe of Bekkeskov

The Von Munthe af Morgenstierne family is a Danish and a Norwegian noble family living in Norway and The Netherlands. It descends from Bredo Munthe of Bekkeskov, who on 19 December 1755 was ennobled under the name von Munthe af Morgenstierne. The family is included in the Yearbook of the Danish Nobility.

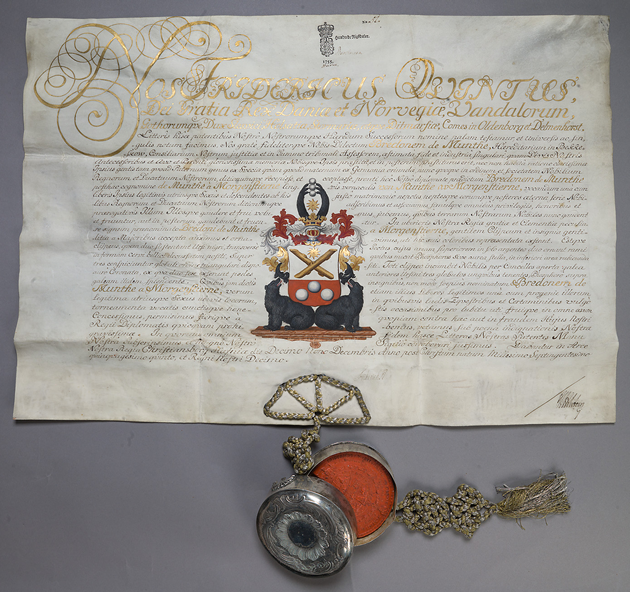
Letter of nobility of 1755 to Bredo Munthe, thereafter Bredo von Munthe af Morgenstierne. It includes the family's coat of arms

== Name ==
The noble name von Munthe af Morgenstierne was derived from the surnames of two families, Munthe and Morgenstierne, from which Bredo Munthe had descended. When he applied for ennoblement, he claimed that these two families were originally noble.

== Origin ==
Supreme Court Judge Bredo Munthe (1701–1757) was the son of Otto Christophersen Munthe (1659–1733), parish priest at Fron in Gudbrandsdalen and great-grandson of Ludvig Hansen Munthe (1593–1649), Bishop of the Diocese of Bergen. Paternally he descended from bailiff Christopher Giertssøn Morgenstierne (1619–79) who married Birgitta Ludvigsdatter Munthe (1634–1708). Their seven children took the surname Munthe.

== Coat of arms ==
The arms, which were granted upon the ennoblement, are partly based on Munthe's old arms.

Description: On a shield divided into two fields, whereof the upper is silver and the lower is red, in the 1st field two chopped and crossed brown tree stems under a ten-pointed golden star, and in the 2nd field three silver balls. On the helm a noble coronet and up from this two bear paws holding three silver balls. Supporters: two against each other sitting and onto the shield looking brown bears.

== Members ==
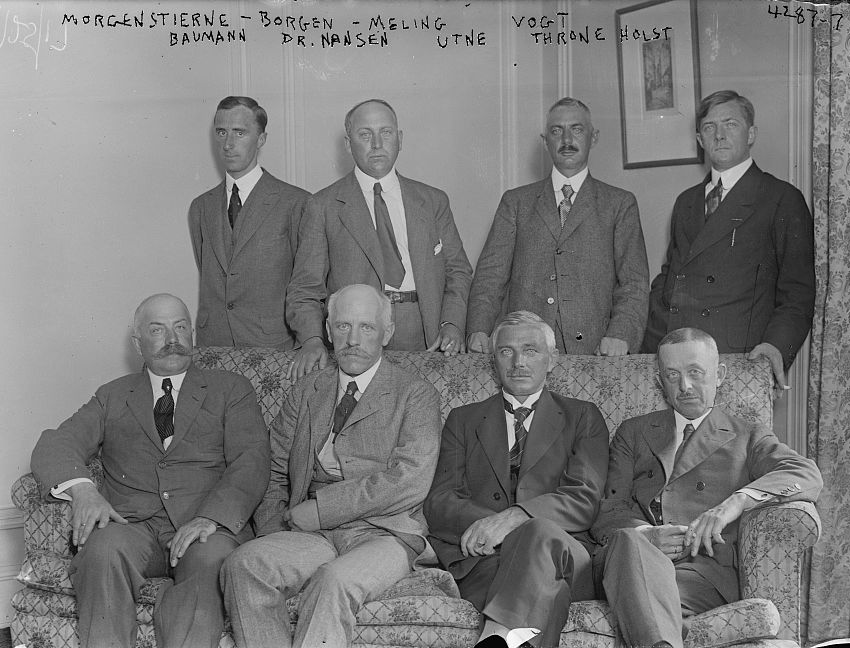
Norwegian delegation to the United States of America during the First World War. Wilhelm Thorleif von Munthe af Morgenstierne upper left.

- Bredo von Munthe af Morgenstierne
- Otto Christopher von Munthe af Morgenstierne
- Christian Fredrik Jacob von Munthe af Morgenstierne
- Vilhelm Ludvig Herman von Munthe af Morgenstierne
- Bredo Henrik von Munthe af Morgenstierne, Sr.
- Bredo Henrik von Munthe af Morgenstierne
- Christian von Munthe af Morgenstierne
- Otto Christofer von Munthe af Morgenstierne
- Wilhelm Thorleif von Munthe af Morgenstierne
- Georg Valentin von Munthe af Morgenstierne
- Otto von Munthe af Morgenstierne
- Leonardus Valentin von Munthe af Morgenstierne

== See also ==
- Norwegian nobility
- Munthe
- Christopher Morgenstierne Munthe

== Literature and sources ==
- Hans Krag (1955): Norsk heraldisk mønstring fra Fredrik IVss regjeringstid 1699–1730
- Hans Cappelen (1969): Norske slektsvåpen
- Herman Leopoldus Løvenskiold (1978): Heraldisk nøkkel
- Harald Nissen & Monica Aase (1990): Segl i Universitetsbiblioteket i Trondheim
