= Lagertha Munthe =

Norwegian artist (1888–1984)

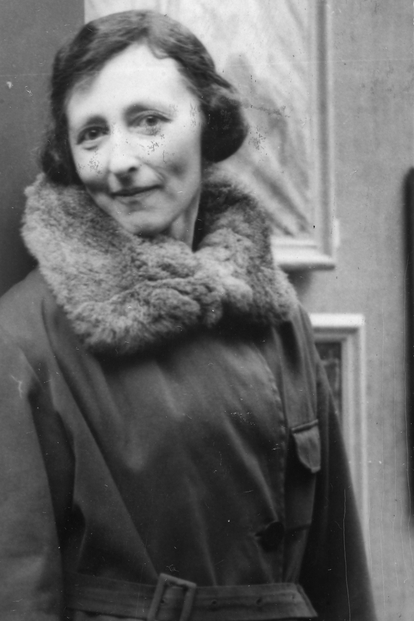
Lagertha Munthe, photographed about 1935. The photograph belongs to the collection of the city museum of Oslo ("Oslo Museum").

Lagertha Munthe (16 March 1888 – 25 March 1984) was a Norwegian painter.

She was born in Kristiania as a daughter of Olaf Andreas Jens Wilhelm Munthe (1851–1914). She was a grandniece of historian and cartographer Gerhard Munthe, a niece of historian Hartvig Andreas Munthe, painter Gerhard Munthe, writer Margrethe Munthe and Major General Carl Oscar Munthe, and a first cousin of librarian Wilhelm Munthe and genealogist Christopher Morgenstierne Munthe.

She studied at the Norwegian National Academy of Fine Arts from 1909 to 1911, under notable painters such as Christian Krohg, Halfdan Strøm, Oluf Wold-Torne and Henrik Sørensen. Several of her landscape paintings are owned by the National Gallery of Norway.
