= Bolteløkka Skole =

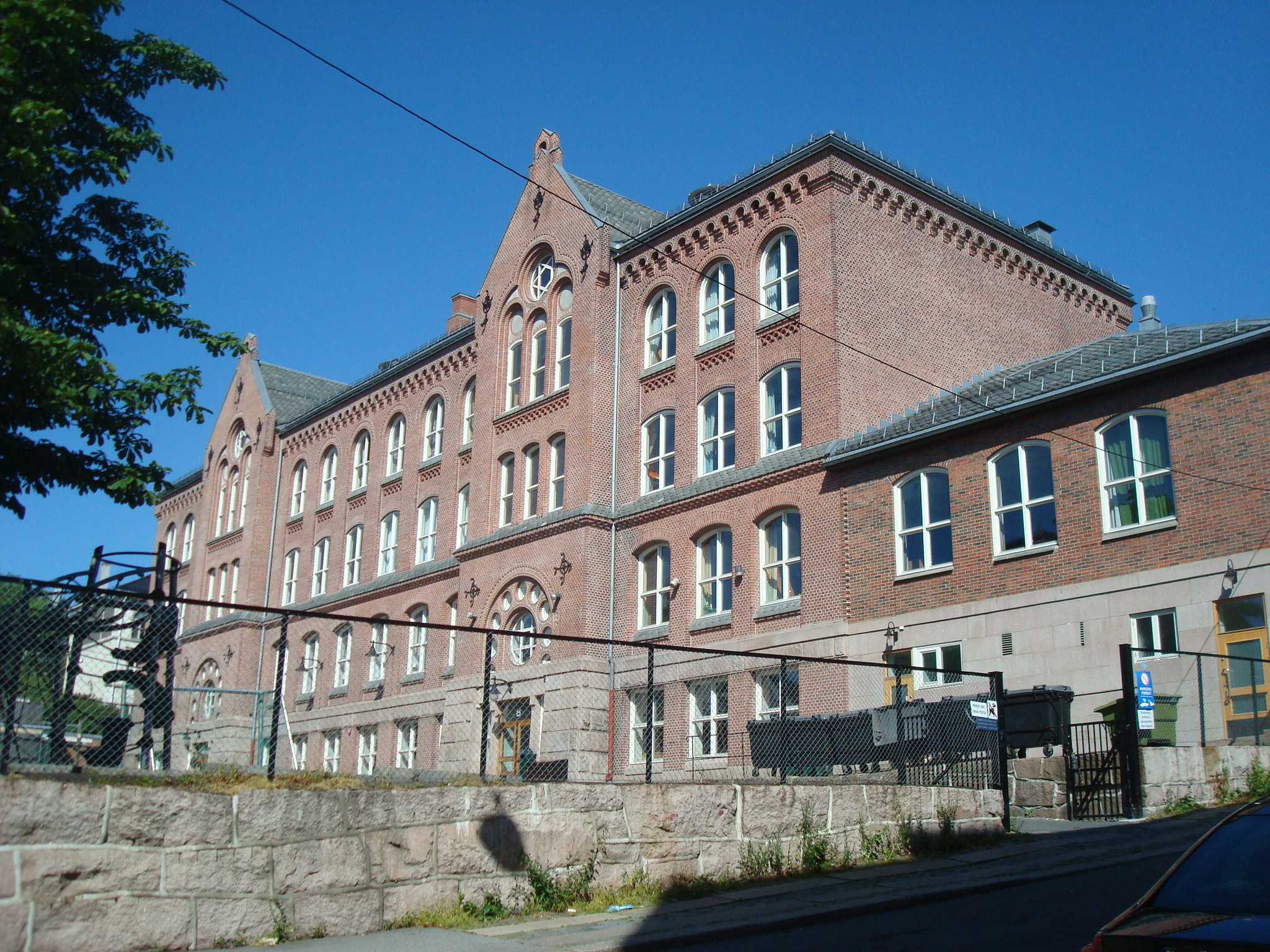

Location
- Bolteløkka, Oslo; Norway
- Coordinates: 59°55′39″N 10°44′06″E

Information
- Type: Elementary School
- Opened: October, 1898
- School district: St. Hanshaugen
- Principal: Ronny Sollien Engebråten
- Employees: 54 (2017)
- Grades: 1-7
- Enrollment: 422 (2017)
- Website: https://boltelokka.osloskolen.no

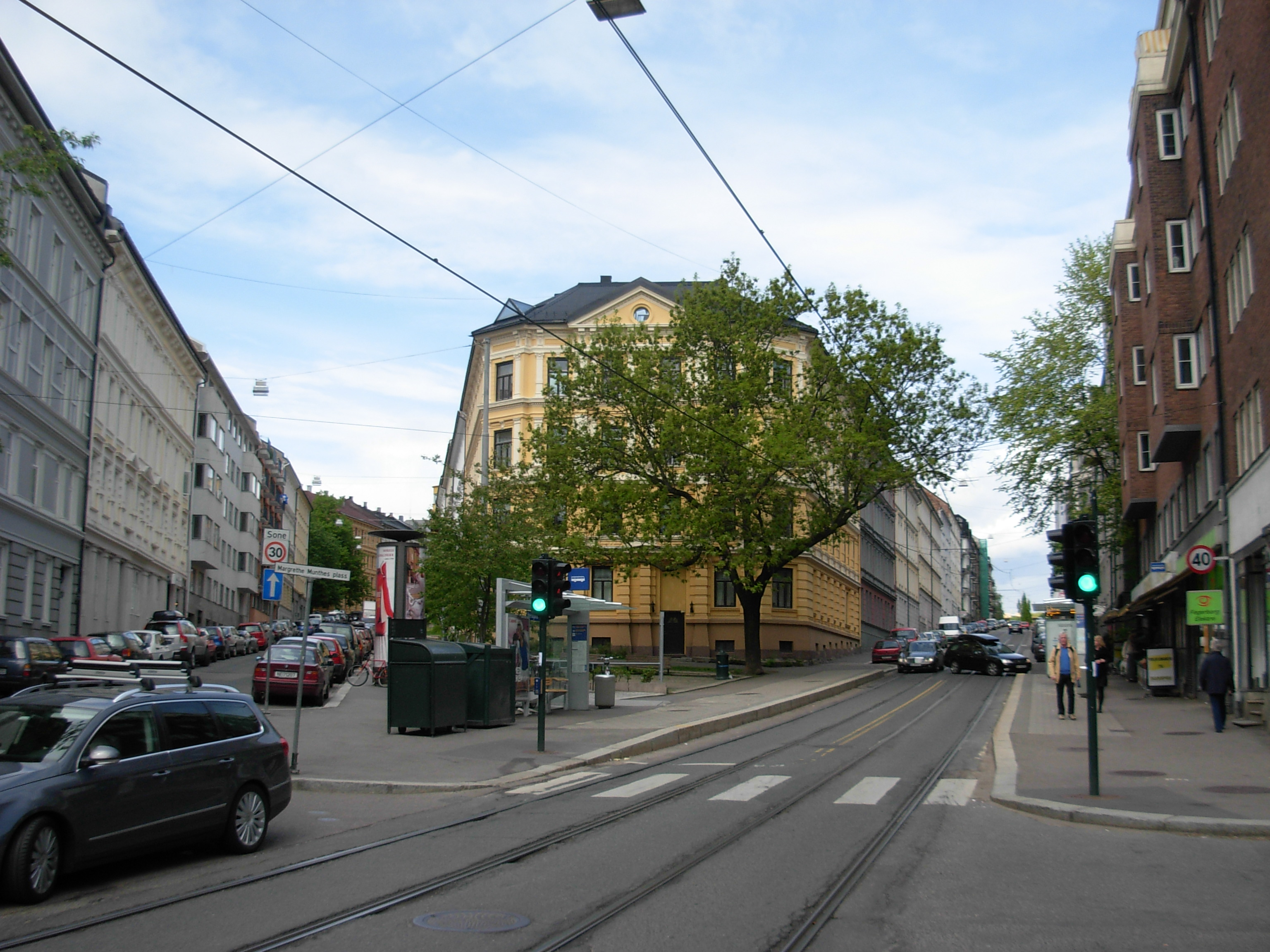
Margrethe Munthe Square

Bolteløkka Skole (School) is an elementary school offering primary education from grades one through seven, located in Bolteløkka, Oslo. The campus was designed in Neo-Gothic style with Romanesque influence by state architect Holm Munthe, and opened in October 1898.

== History ==
=== Establishment ===
Today's campus grounds were once occupied by a large toad pond, which is said to have been enjoyed by the local youth. At the time, it was located in the countryside. Upon its inception, there were a total of 1299 students receiving education in two shifts, one in the morning (8:00-12:00), and one in the afternoon (12:00-16:00). The campus is split into two schoolyards, originally done to keep boys and girls separated, it is now used to split higher and lower grades (1-4, 5–7). For a long time, the school was one of the largest of its kind in the country.

Around the year of 1907, the school experienced its highest student count at 2021 students total.

=== Culture ===
'Bolteløkka Skoles Musikkorps' (Bolteløkka School's Marching Band) was founded as a boy's marching band as early as 1902, by then headmaster H. Trætteberg. The marching band was later dissolved, but by 1931 it was reorganised and started anew. In 1960, girls were finally allowed to join the marching band alongside boys.

Margrethe Munthe served as a teacher from 1902 until 1920, whereafter she retired and moved to Italy. Margrethe Munthe Square is located close to the school.

In May 2001, during a state visit to Norway, Queen Elizabeth II & Prince Philip made a visit to the school. A performance was held by a class of third graders, reciting English versions of popular children's songs and a short play. The visit lasted for one hour, whereafter the Queen and her consort were taken to the Oslo City Hall for an exhibition in British design.

=== Second World War ===
On 4 May 1940, during the German occupation of Norway, the school was requisitioned by German forces and used as barracks. The school was released to its former function from August 19, 1940, to April 4, 1942, whereafter it was again fully requisitioned by German forces. During the 'Liberation of Finnmark,' the school served as accommodation for the evacuated from November 1944 through to February 8, 1945. From 8 February 1944, the school along with its headmaster & custodian courters were requisitioned by 'Hirdens bedriftsvern' (Hirden's Industry Protection Service). Following the liberation of Norway the school was used by the Red Cross as a gathering point for newly released prisoners of war. On 18 July 1945, the school was finally freed and restored to its intended purpose.

== Today ==
As of 2017, the school teaches 422 students in grades 1-7 and employs 54 members of staff. The campus offers a solid selection of playground venues including jungle gyms, football fields, a mini-pitch, a stickball field and a basketball field. Newly refurbished is the workshop, gathering room along with the addition of two new classrooms. As of the 2017-2018 'Skoleraporten' the school has scored above national average in all three categories tested; English, Reading & Maths.

=== Principals ===
- 2016-: Ronny Sollien Engebråten
- 2007-2016: Dag Harald Gomnæs
