= Ludvig Munthe (bishop) =

Ludvig Hanssøn Munthe (August 2, 1593 – December 3, 1649) was the Bishop of the Diocese of Bjørgvin from 1636 to 1649.

== Life and work ==
Munthe was born in Tikøb, Denmark. He was the son of the parish priest Hans Ludvigssøn Munthe (1560–1601) and Anne Catharina de Fine (1566–1601). Munthe came from a family of priests. Both of his parents died from the plague in 1601, and Ludvig was educated at his uncle's residence in Lund.

In 1613 he was admitted to the University of Copenhagen, where he received his bachelor's degree in 1616 and master's degree in 1619. He became a teacher at Lund Cathedral School in 1616, but resigned shortly after to privately teach several of the sons of the nobleman Otto Lindenov. This involved two long trips abroad. He spent six years at German universities and became familiar with contemporary theological and religious orientations.

In 1624 he was appointed parish priest at Nordre Borreby in Scania, and in 1634 senior court priest (hoffpredikant) at the court for King Christian IV. In 1636, Munthe was named Bishop of Bergen and he arrived in the town in March 1637. He was the first member of the Munthe family to arrive in Norway, when he took the office of his diocese. As bishop, he worked intensely to develop schooling and popular education through the liturgy and religious life. After the town fire of 1640, he rebuilt Bergen Cathedral School and expanded preaching and teaching activities.

Bishop Munthe published an exposition of the catechism in 1644. Munthe's views represented the widespread Lutheran orthodoxy of his time. Some of his effort was directed against "pagan and papist customs" in the form of carnival customs and processions. He criticized popular customs, including the use of images of the saints and the pilgrimage to Røldal.

== Family and descendants ==
In 1624, Munthe married Ingeborg Sørensdatter Friis, daughter of the court scribe Søren Friis. They were the parents of twelve children. Munthe died at Bergen in 1649; his wife died in 1654.

Munthe's daughter Elisabeth Munthe (c. 1630 – c. 1649) was the wife of Christen Paus, mayor of Bergen. His daughter Birgitte Munthe (1634–1708) married Christopher Morgenstierne (1619–1679). His daughter Abel Munthe (1628–1676), who was married to university professor Peder Lem (1617–1663), was the grandmother of Ludvig Holberg.

== See also ==
- Munthe af Morgenstierne (noble family)
