= Jenny Hempel =

Danish botanist

Jenny Hempel (19 February 1882 – 13 February 1975) was a Danish plant physiology pioneer. In 1916, she was the first Danish woman to receive a doctoral degree in a botanical discipline – and until 1956, she was the only. She discovered the diurnal fluctuations in cell sap acidity in succulent plants, which are now known to be linked with the CAM photosynthetic pathway.

== Life ==
Jenny Hempel was the daughter of a Copenhagen apothecary. She studied plant physiology under professor Wilhelm Johannsen, together with P. Boysen Jensen. She received the degree of magister in 1911 for her studies on the effect of ether on plant growth. She then worked with S. P. L. Sørensen at the Carlsberg Laboratory. There she studied the pH of plant sap, in particular the diurnal fluctuations in sap acidity in succulent plants first observed by Benjamin Heyne. She took her PhD on that topic in 1916 becoming the first Danish female to do so. In 1917, she married the Norwegian librarian Wilhelm Munthe, with whom she had two son, one of whom was being Preben Munthe. After her marriage, she gave up her scientific career. Her discoveries led directly to broader investigations of the pH of soils and plants by Christen Raunkiær and his student Carsten Olsen.
