= Andreas Leigh Aabel =

Norwegian physician and poet (1830–1901)

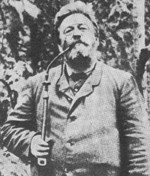
- Born: 10 February 1830; Sogndal, Norway
- Died: 9 May 1901 (aged 71)
- Education: University of Oslo
- Occupations: Physician, poet
- Children: Hauk Aabel
- Relatives: Oluf Andreas Aabel (brother), Per Aabel and Andreas Aabel (grandsons)

Morten Andreas Leigh Aabel (10 February 1830 – 9 May 1901) was a Norwegian physician and poet. He is the direct ancestor of many famous Norweigians, including Hauk Aabel, Per Aabel, and Andreas Aabel.

== Biography ==
He was born at Sogndal in Nordre Bergenhus county, Norway. His father, Peter Pavels Aabel (1795-1869), was the vicar and senior priest in Sogndal from 1824–1833. He was a brother of priest, Oluf Andreas Aabel (1825–1895).

He enrolled as a student in 1848, graduated with the cand.med. degree in 1856. Professionally, he worked as a physician from 1853 to 1899, and was a district physician in several Norwegian districts. He first worked as a district physician for western Finnmark, based in Hammerfest followed by private practice in Åsnes Municipality. At the end of the 1850s, Aabel became a doctor at Nes Municipality in Romerike. In 1864 he was appointed a district physician in Sunnfjord, and the family settled at Falkenstein in Førde Municipality. From 1876 to 1885 he was a doctor in Nord-Aurdal Municipality in Valdres. In 1885, he was appointed a district doctor for Toten where he stayed for ten years. Aabel moved to Gjøvik Municipality in 1895 and in 1899 he retired.

While studying he was a member of the Literary Association and the Norwegian Students' Society. He started writing poems and songs, and continued after graduation.

In 1857 he married Wilhelmine Louise Collett (1834–1901), a descendant of Christian Ancher Collett. Their son Hauk Aabel was a notable actor and through him, Andreas was a grandfather of actors Per Aabel and Andreas Aabel. Through his sister Christine Margrethe Aabel (1827–1887), he was the uncle of Hartvig Andreas, Gerhard, Margrethe and Carl Oscar Munthe.

== Works ==
- Rimstubber (1862)
- Høstblomster
- Rimstubber II (1896)
