= Christopher Morgenstierne Munthe =

Norwegian civil servant, military officer and genealogist

Christopher Morgenstierne Munthe (14 July 1875 – 21 December 1939) was a Norwegian civil servant, military officer and genealogist.

== Biography ==
He was a born in Christiania (now Oslo), Norway. He was the son of colonel and historian Hartvig Andreas Munthe (1845–1905). He was also a grandnephew of historian and cartographer Gerhard Munthe, a nephew of painter Gerhard Munthe, writer Margrethe Munthe and Major General Carl Oscar Munthe, and a first cousin of librarian Wilhelm Munthe and painter Lagertha Munthe.

After graduating from the Norwegian Military College, he became a lieutenant in the Kristiansand Brigade. Later he joined the Field Artillery and became captain in 1911. He took a law degree in 1908, and then became a clerk with the magistrate at Romerike. He served as secretary in the Norwegian Ministry of Defense in 1912 and from 1917 he was the bureau chief.

Before 1926 he was, together with Stian Herlofsen Finne-Grønn and Erik Andreas Thomle, a co-editor of the periodical Norsk tidsskrift for genealogi, personalhistorie, biografi og litteraturhistorie. This was Norway's first periodical on genealogy. In 1926 he was among the founders of the Norwegian Genealogical Society together with Stian Herlofsen Finne-Grønn and Sigurd Segelcke Meidell. The organization launched a new periodical, Norsk Slektshistorisk Tidsskrift.
