= Carl Oscar Munthe =

Norwegian military officer and historian

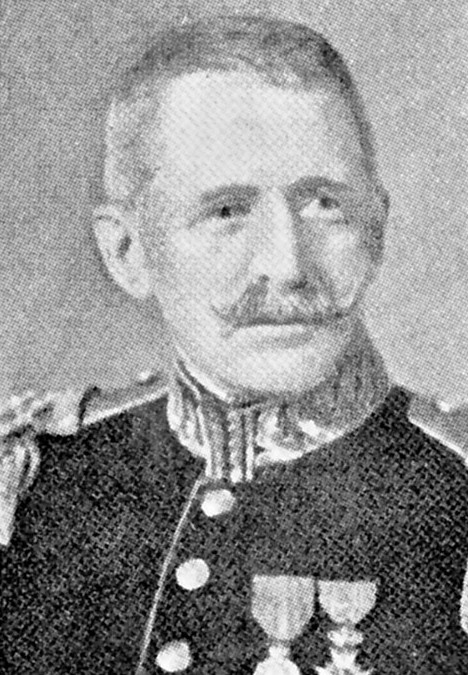
Carl Oscar Munthe (date unknown)

Carl Oscar Munthe (12 December 1861 – 20 December 1952) was a Norwegian military officer and historian.

== Personal life ==
He was born in Elverum as a son of physician Christopher Pavels Munthe (1816–1884). He was a younger brother of historian and military officer Hartvig Andreas Munthe, painter Gerhard Munthe and writer Margrethe Munthe. He was also a nephew of historian and cartographer Gerhard Munthe and an uncle of genealogist Christopher Morgenstierne Munthe, librarian Wilhelm Munthe and painter Lagertha Munthe. Through his mother he was a nephew of Andreas Leigh Aabel and Oluf Andreas Aabel, and a first cousin of Hauk Aabel.

In September 1893 he married Valborg Bøgh (1862–1925).

== Career ==
His main career was with the military. He rose through the ranks; becoming premier lieutenant in 1886, captain in 1894, major in 1910, lieutenant colonel in 1911 and colonel in 1912. He was a teacher at the Norwegian Military Academy from 1902 to 1916. He was then the commander of Fredrikstad Fortress from 1916 to 1924 and of Bergenhus Fortress from 1924 to 1929.

His first major work on military history was released in 1897, and several followed, except in the years when he was a fortress commander. The first work pertained to military officer Peder von Todderud and the chronicles he wrote during the Great Northern War. In 1901 came a work about the Hannibal War. The older history of the fortresses Frederikshald and Frederikssten followed in 1906. In 1909 he biographed Johan Georg Ræder, a lieutenant colonel who lived from 1751 to 1808. After retiring as a commander, Munthe drifted away from military history, and instead drew his book topics from Medieval Norway themes.

Munthe resided at Fantoft for the latter years of his life. He had an engagement in the Regional State Archive of Bergen from 1934. He was also associated with the Norwegian Mapping and Cadastre Authority (then known as Norges Geografiske Oppmåling) during his career, and contributed to newspapers, periodicals as well as the encyclopedias Dansk biografisk lexikon, Norsk biografisk leksikon and Aschehougs konversationsleksikon. He died in 1952.
