= Sigurd S. Meidell =

Norwegian journalist, genealogist and novelist

Sigurd Segelcke Meidell
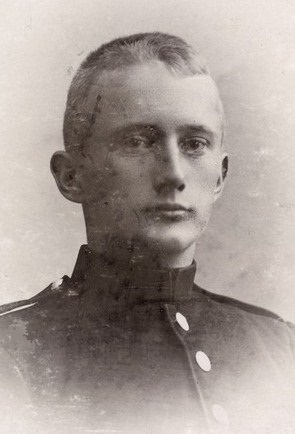
- Portrait of Meidell, taken in 1898
- Born: 20 February 1878; Bergen, Norway
- Died: 26 July 1968 (aged 90); Oslo, Norway
- Other name: Arne Vaagen
- Occupations: Journalist, genealogist, and novelist

Sigurd Segelcke Meidell (20 February 1878 – 26 July 1968) was a Norwegian journalist, genealogist and novelist.

== Biography ==
He was born in Bergen as a son of sea captain Hartvig Segelcke Meidell (1834–1902) and Malin Gohde (1847–1895). His father's family hailed from Kvinnherad Municipality, and his mother's family was Swedish. He was the brother of Fascist politician Birger Meidell. In August 1908 he married Nunne Thorbjørnsen (1885–1949).

Meidell grew up in Hamar. He finished his secondary education in 1898, enrolled in law studies and graduated with the cand.jur. degree in 1905. From 1906 to 1908 he was a foreign affairs journalist and theatre critic in the newspaper Morgenbladet. He also worked as the Kristiania city correspondent of Bergens Aftenblad and Trondhjems Adresseavis. In 1908 he co-founded and edited the sports magazine Sport.

In 1926 he was among the founders of the Norwegian Genealogical Society, together with Stian Herlofsen Finne-Grønn and Christopher Morgenstierne Munthe, among others. This was Norway's first national genealogical society. He was the chairman of the organization from 1940 to 1943, taking over from Halvdan Koht who went into exile following the German invasion of Norway on 9 April 1940. On the very same day, his brother was named as Minister of Church and Education in the Vidkun Quisling government that attempted a coup d'etat.

Meidell left the chair in 1943. He was also a member of the board of the Norwegian Museum of Cultural History and Landslaget for By- og Bygdehistorie. From 1941 he tried his luck as a novelist, under the pseudonym Arne Vaagen. He published eight novels in all, and the first three enjoyed some popularity. In 1956 he published his memoirs, Møte med livet. He was also an editorial committee member of Norsk biografisk leksikon.

In 1956, Meidell was decorated as a Knight, First Class of the Order of St. Olav and was awarded the King's Medal of Merit in gold. He was also a Knight of the Danish Order of the Dannebrog and Commander of the Finnish Order of the White Rose. He died in 1968 in Oslo.

Cultural offices
Preceded by Halvdan Koht	Chairman of the Norwegian Genealogical Society; 1940–1943	Succeeded by Theodor Bull
