= Norwegian Heraldry Society =

Heraldry society located in Oslo, Norway

Coat of arms of the Norwegian Heraldry Society.

Norwegian Heraldry Society (Norwegian: Norsk Heraldisk Forening, NHF) is a heraldry society located in Oslo, Norway, which was founded in 1969.

The first chairman was Herman Leopoldus Løvenskiold, and other founding members include C. S. Schilbred and Jørgen Mathiesen. The Norwegian Heraldry Society organizes lectures and publishes the members' magazine Våpenbrevet ("Letters Patent"). It co-operates extensively with the Societas Heraldica Scandinavica.

In 2014, it co-organised the XXXI International Congress of Genealogical and Heraldic Sciences.
