= C. S. Schilbred =

Norwegian genealogist, historian and educator

Cornelius Severin Scheel Schilbred, often referred to as C. S. Schilbred (13 December 1906 – 10 April 1985) was a Norwegian genealogist, historian and educator. A school teacher and headmaster by occupation, he wrote extensively, and chaired the Norwegian Genealogical Society and the Norwegian Heraldry Society.

== Early life ==
He was born in Eidanger Municipality as a son of Lieutenant Colonel Cornelius Mathias Schilbred (1878–1949) and Marie Henriette Petersen (1885–1965). In 1939 he married Margrethe Lomsdal (1908–2000).

Schilbred grew up in Eidanger and Oslo. He finished his secondary education in 1925, enrolled in law studies and graduated with the cand.jur. degree in 1931. While studying he was an editor of the politically conservative periodical Minerva, and in 1928 a member of the board of the Norwegian Students' Society. In 1926, despite his young age, he was among the founders of the Norwegian Genealogical Society. This was Norway's first national genealogical society.

== Later life ==
Schilbred spent his entire professional career as a teacher and headmaster in Oslo. In his spare time he had a considerable production of genealogical and local-historical works. He became a member of the board of the Norwegian Genealogical Society in 1952, served as vice chairman from 1957 and then chairman from 1968 to 1980. He edited its official periodical Norsk slektshistorisk tidsskrift from 1960 to 1967. He had formerly edited Tidsskrift for handelsutdannelse from 1948 to 1953, and also contributed to Aschehougs konversasjonsleksikon and Store norske leksikon. He also co-founded the Norwegian Heraldry Society in 1969. He was a member of the board from the start, vice chairman from 1970 and then chairman from 1973 to 1974. He also served as vice chairman of the Norwegian Society for the Protection of Animals.

Schilbred was decorated as a Knight, First Class of the Order of St. Olav in 1977. He was an honorary member of the Society for the Protection of Animals. He died in April 1985 in Oslo.

Cultural offices
Preceded by Otto Sverdrup Engelschiøn	Chairman of the Norwegian Genealogical Society; 1968–1980	Succeeded by Per Seland
