= Margrethe Munthe =

Norwegian children's writer and songwriter (1860–1931)

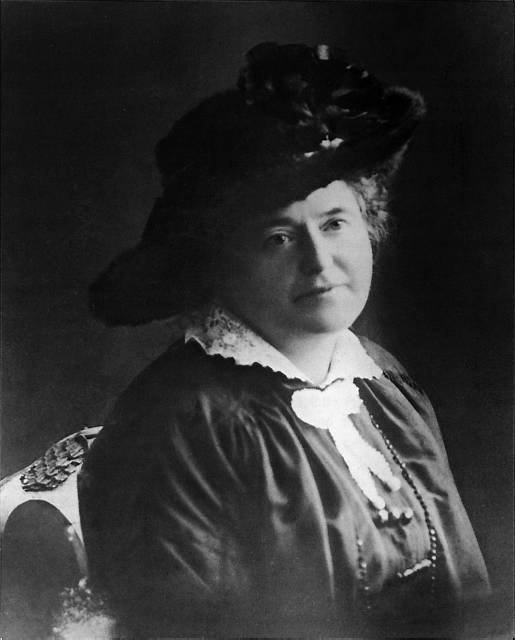
- Born: Margrethe Aabel Munthe; 27 May 1860; Elverum, Norway
- Died: 20 January 1931 (aged 70); Oslo, Norway
- Occupations: teacher, children's writer, songwriter and playwright.
- Notable work: "Hurra for deg som fyller ditt år!", "På låven sitter nissen", "Å jeg vet en seter", "Da klokken klang", "Nei, nei gutt", "Tulla" and "Jeg snører min sekk" (songs); Kom, skal vi synge (songbook series)
- Relatives: Hartvig Andreas Munthe (brother); Gerhard Munthe (brother); Carl Oscar Munthe (brother)

Margrethe Aabel Munthe (27 May 1860 – 20 January 1931) was a Norwegian teacher, children's writer, songwriter and playwright.

== Personal life ==
Margrethe Munthe was born in Elverum Municipality as the daughter of physician Christopher Pavels Munthe (1816–1884) and Christine Margrethe Pavels Aabel (1827–1887). She was a younger sister of historian and military officer Hartvig Andreas Munthe, painter Gerhard Munthe and older sister of officer and historian Carl Oscar Munthe. She was also a niece of historian and cartographer Gerhard Munthe and an aunt of genealogist Christopher Morgenstierne Munthe, librarian Wilhelm Munthe and painter Lagertha Munthe. Through her mother she was a first cousin of Hauk Aabel, niece of Andreas Leigh Aabel and Oluf Andreas Aabel.

== Career ==
Munthe attended Hartvig Nissen's school for girls in Christiania (Nissens Pigeskole), and graduated with a middle school exam (middelskoleeksamen) in 1879. She worked as a governess at her home place for one year, and then ran a private school in Langesund. She passed a higher degree for female teachers in 1883. She was appointed as a teacher at the Vaterland primary school in Kristiania from 1888 to 1893, and again from 1895. From 1902 to 1920 she worked at the Bolteløkka primary school.

She wrote a large number of song texts to folk melodies and psalm melodies, many of which are still popular today. Among her classical songs are "Hurra for deg som fyller ditt år!", "På låven sitter nissen" (English: Santa on the barn has got his Christmas treat), "Å jeg vet en seter", "Da klokken klang", "Nei, nei gutt", "Tulla" and "Jeg snører min sekk". She published the songbooks Kom, skal vi synge (three collections, from 1905 to 1918). She wrote the fairytale comedy Aase Fiskerjente, published as a book in 1912 with illustrations by Andreas Bloch. Among her other comedies for children are Askepot, Den nysgjerrige kone and Prinsessen og det halve rike.

== Legacy ==
Singer Wenche Myhre, accompanied by Sigurd Jansen's orchestra, included several songs by Munthe on her album series Sanger fra dengang mor var liten (1967, 1976 and 1981), with songs such as "Å jeg strever så med mine små du" and "Kjære Gud, jeg har det godt". Åse Thoresen and Ingebrigt Davik issued two albums with her songs, Kom skal vi synge from 1972, and Kjære kom og dans med meg from 1974. During the 1960s and 1970s Munthe's children's songs were heavily criticized for being too moralizing, but from the 1990s they were again accepted, as relics from a strange and ancient world.
