= Wilhelm Maximilian Carpelan =

Finnish-Swedish surveyor and cartographer (1787–1830)

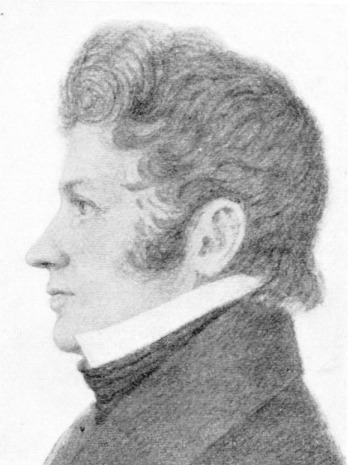
Wilhelm Carpelan; sketch by Olof Johan Södermark

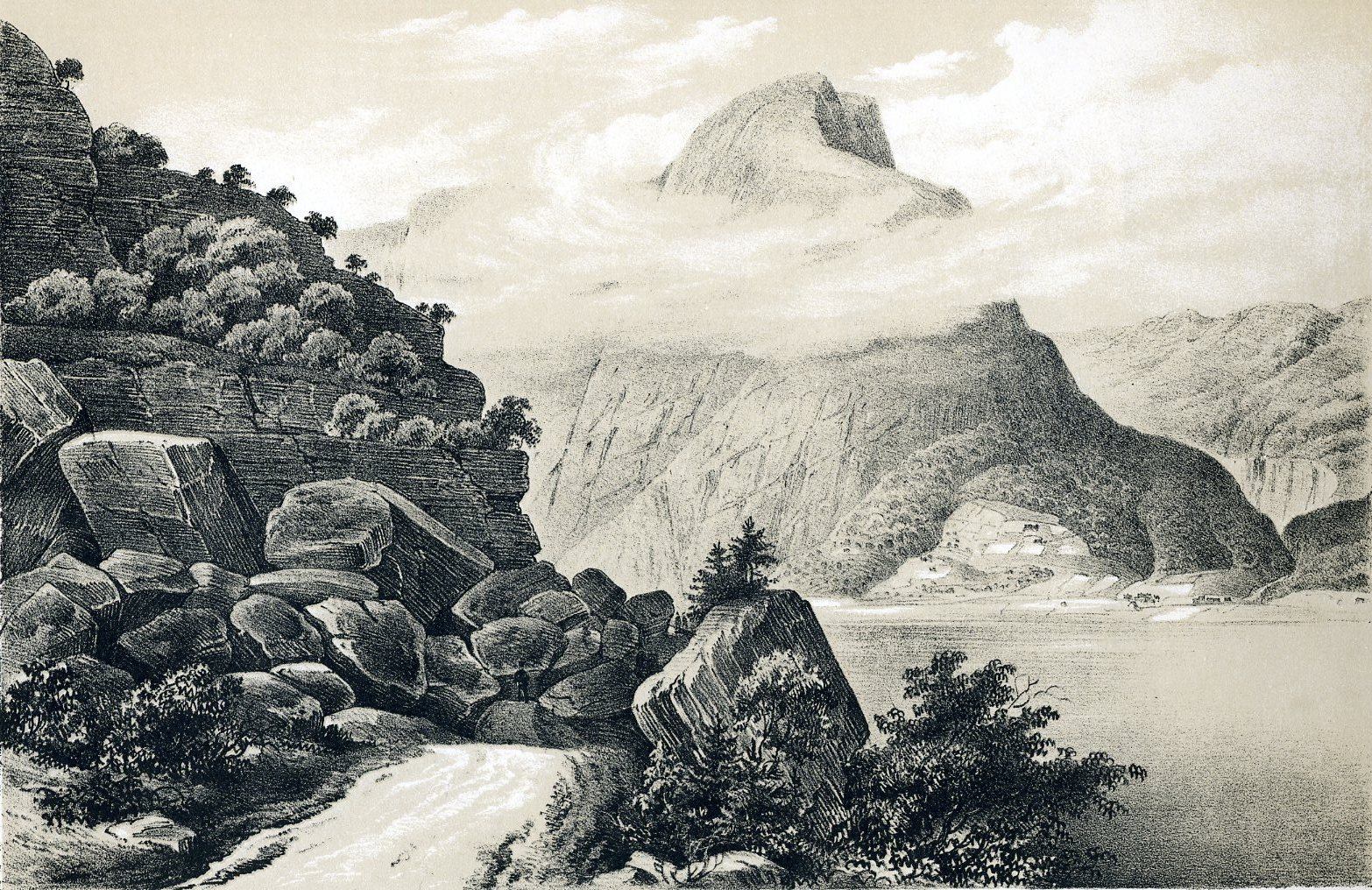
The Sjudshorn, near Valdres

Wilhelm Maximilian Carpelan (7 January 1787, Taivassalo – 19 May 1830, Stockholm) was a Swedish military officer, draftsman, surveyor and cartographer. Together with Johannes Flintoe and Heinrich August Grosch, he was one of the first to survey and describe the interior of Norway; notably Telemark.

== Biography ==
Carpelan was born into the Finnish Carpelan noble family. He was trained at the war school in Haapaniemi and served in the Stockholm Surveyor Corps. When Sweden was forced to cede Finland to Russia in 1809, he remained in the Swedish Army; participating in the construction of the Göta Canal and the Siege of Fredriksten. In 1819, he accompanied the expedition of Gerhard Munthe to Aurland and later created paintings from gouaches by Johannes Flintoe. Their drawings were exhibited in Christiania (Oslo) in 1820 and received much publicity.

From 1819 to 1824, he was an Adjutant to the Swedish Riksstattholder, Johan August Sandels. During his travels with Sandels, he created landscapes in charcoal, oil and watercolor that were published in the booklet Voyage picturesque aux alpes norvégiennes (1821-23). These include what may be the first images of Hurrungane. In 1824, he returned to the Army, with the rank of Oberstløytnant (Lieutenant -Colonel).

In 1826, he was given the task of organizing and leading the Engineering Corps' map engraving division; making enlargements of older maps of Norway and Sweden. He travelled throughout the interior regions in the company of Christopher Hansteen, making altitude measurements with the help of a barometer. He also collaborated with Baltazar Mathias Keilhau; creating formal drawings from Keilhau's sketches. His works also appear in Norge fremstillet i Tegninger, by Christian Tønsberg.

His oil paintings, probably few in number, have all disappeared. In 1829, he was admitted to the Royal Academy of War Sciences. His cause of death is believed to be poisoning from the chemicals used in aquatint etching.

In 2012, a retrospective of his plans and drawings was shown at the National Museum of Art, Architecture and Design as part of an exhibition called "Outlook. Norway seen from the road 1733-2020".
