= Anders Krogvig =

Norwegian librarian and editor

Anders Krogvig (29 April 1880 – 3 April 1924) was a Norwegian librarian, writer, literary consultant and critic.

He was born in Kristiania as the son of Carl Gustav Krogvig and Antonette Pedersen. He was a first cousin of Tryggve Andersen. In April 1903 he married Aagot Kristine Moe (1881–1923). He finished his secondary education in 1899, and enrolled in philology at the University of Kristiania. However, he did not graduate. Instead he took work as a librarian, first at the Museum of Decorative Arts and Design from 1909 to 1918, then in the Norwegian Parliament from 1921 to his death. He applied for a professorship at the university in 1919, but was not appointed.

Krogvig also worked in the publishing house Aschehoug, together with Gerhard Gran and director William Martin Nygaard. He was involved in several of their flagships; being subeditor of the periodical Samtiden from 1916, editor-in-chief of the encyclopedia Achehougs konversasjonsleksikon from 1919, and co-editor of the biographical dictionary Norsk biografisk leksikon from 1921. He edited the first volume (released 1923) together with Gerhard Gran and Edvard Bull, Sr. but died before a second volume was published.

He was also known for re-publishing several old sources, including a collection of letters written by Jørgen Moe, and, together with Moltke Moe, a revision of Peter Christian Asbjørnsen's old fairy tales. He wrote extensively in Norwegian newspapers and periodicals, especially literary critiques. Two collections of his articles were published, titled Nordisk digtning (1912) and Bøker og mennesker (1919). He was also a consultant in the Norwegian Authors' Union. Together with his position in Aschehoug, this meant that Krogvig had a significant impact on many literary careers of the time, including Johan Falkberget, Olav Aukrust, Kristofer Uppdal, and Sigurd Christiansen.
