= Rjukan Arbeiderblad =

Norwegian newspaper

Rjukan Arbeiderblad, commonly known as RA, is a Norwegian newspaper, based in Rjukan and owned by Amedia. It was established in 1923 by the local Labour movement. First editor was Axel Sømme, who edited the newspaper from 1923 to 1924. Trond Hegna was editor-in-chief from 1924.
