= Johannes Flintoe =

Danish-born painter

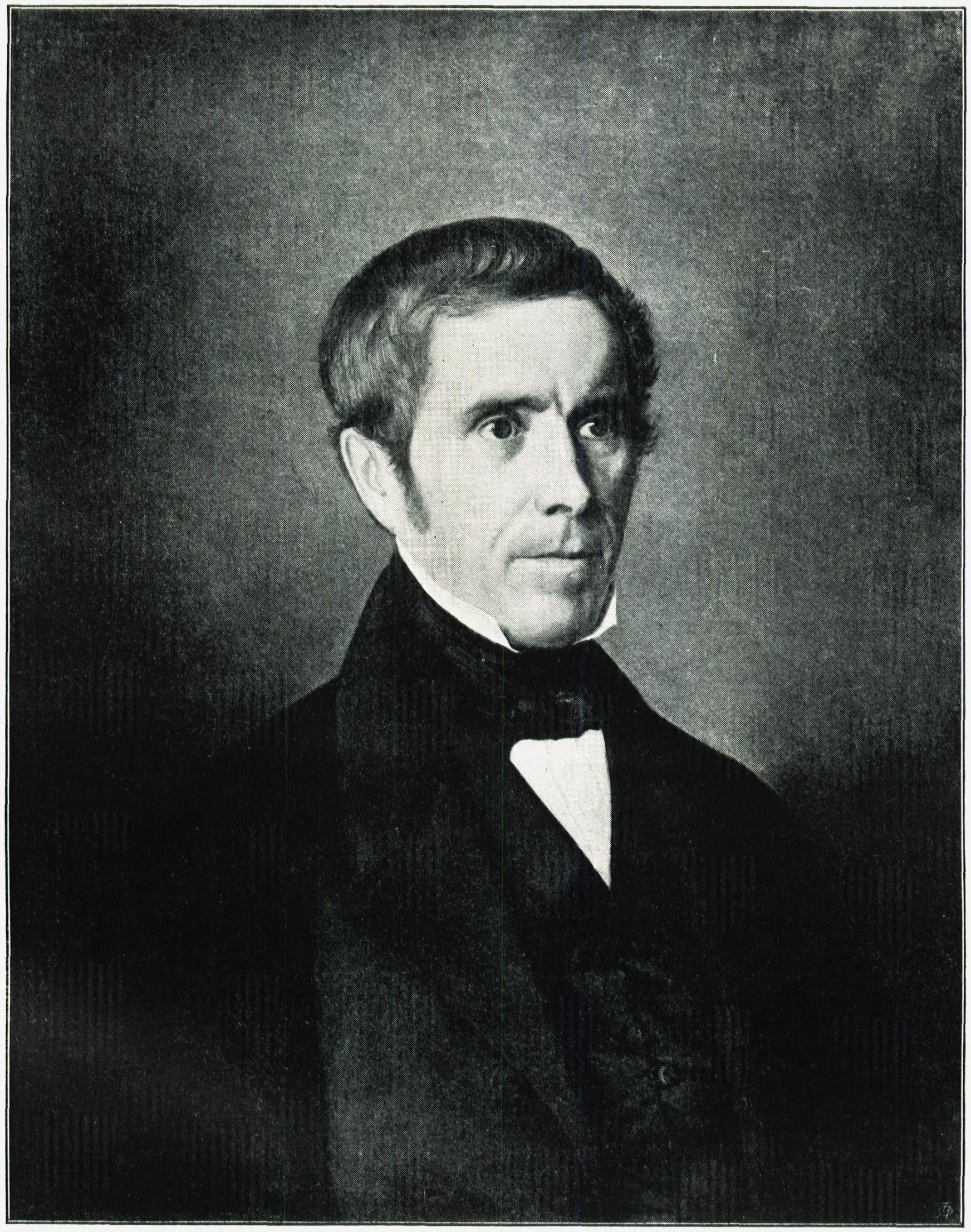
- Johannes Flintoe, portrait by Adolph Tidemand
- Born: 1787; Copenhagen
- Died: January 1870 (aged 82–83); Copenhagen
- Movement: Romanticism

Johannes Flintoe (1786/87, Copenhagen - 27 January 1870, Copenhagen) was a Danish-born painter of Norwegian ancestry. He is known for his landscapes, costume studies and historical scenes. His works play a significant role in the transition to romantic nationalism.

== Biography ==
His family (originally "Flinthoug") came from Hurum and his father was a metal caster. At the age of thirteen, he was apprenticed to a master decorative painter named Pader Faxøe. Faxøe later became Flintoe's foster father. In 1802, he began studies at the Royal Danish Academy of Fine Arts, which he completed in 1805. During this time, he also took private lessons in decorative and theatrical painting. From 1807 to 1808, he served in the Napoleonic Wars and developed rheumatism, which would create health issues for the rest of his life.

In 1811, he was named a master painter in the Copenhagen guild and moved to Christiania (Oslo), to join his brother Jacob, who had become established there as a master mason. He worked as a decorator until he took a teaching position at the newly created Norwegian National Academy of Craft and Art Industry in 1819. During his tenure there, he travelled extensively throughout Norway, visiting Telemark, Hardanger, Trøndelag and other scenic locations, painting local costumes as well as landscapes.

He also accompanied Gerhard Munthe on a mapping expedition to Aurland and, together with Wilhelm Maximilian Carpelan, made some of the first drawings of the Jotunheimen mountains. One of his most popular works is the "Fugleværelset" (Bird Room), a waiting room at the Royal Palace, painted to give the illusion that one is looking at landscapes and the sky from an open pavilion. From 1842 to 1851, he was on the board of the National Gallery.

Many of his sketches and paintings were published from 1838 to 1840 with text by Maurits Hansen. Among his best-known students were Hans Gude and Johan Frederik Eckersberg. In 1851, he returned to Copenhagen and lived on a pension. By 1866, his health had deteriorated to the point that he had to be cared for by the wife of a former student. He died in 1870.

== Selected works ==
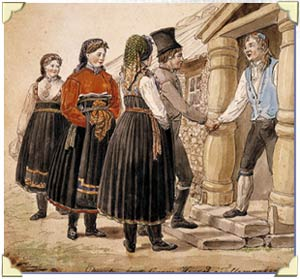
Folk costumes from Telemark.

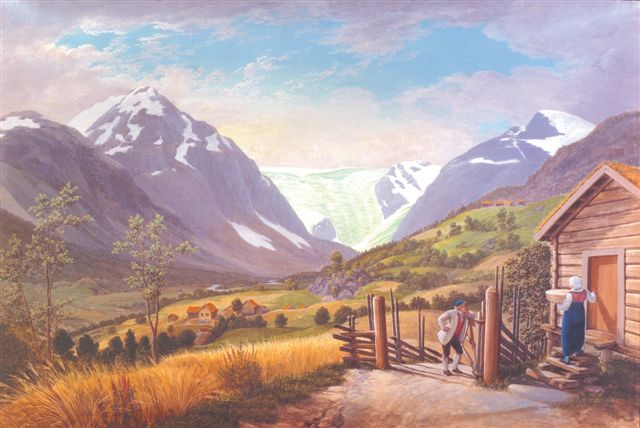
Jostedalen in Vestland.

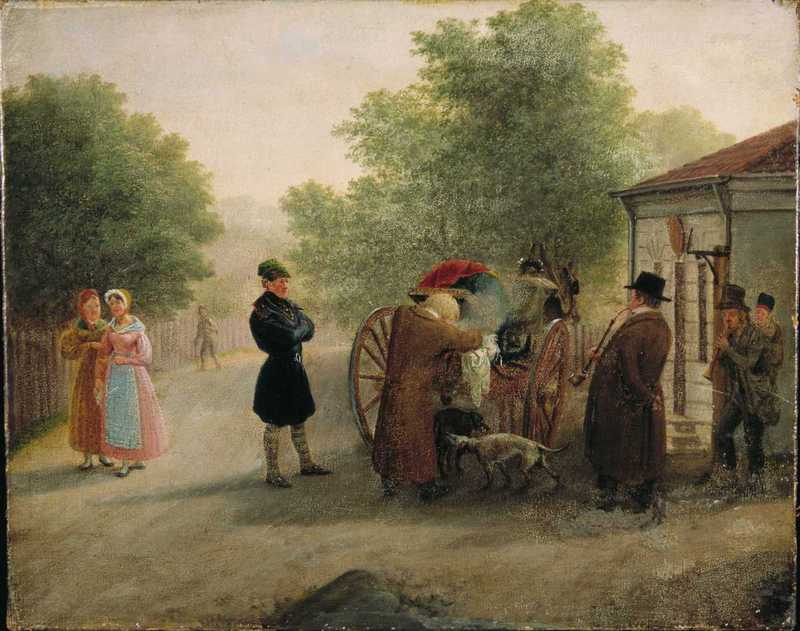
A Customs station

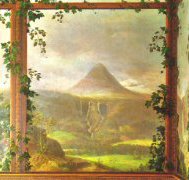
A panel from the Fugleværelset.
