= Otto Sverdrup Engelschiøn =

Otto Sverdrup Engelschiøn (30 October 1902 – 8 May 1982) was a Norwegian marketer, businessperson, resistance member and genealogist.

He was born in Kristiania as a son of consul-general Søren Dass Brodtkorb Sverdrup Engelschiøn (1867–1909) and Janka Hansen (1869–1935). In 1928 he married Gudrun Irgens Garmann.

Engelschiøn finished his secondary education in 1922 and graduated from the Royal Frederick University with the cand.jur. degree in 1926. He was an attorney from 1927, and also director of I. Sverdrup Engelschiøn which had the rights to distribute Swedish Tomten products in Norway. In 1929 it was merged with Norsk Barnengens Tekniske Fabrik. Engelschiøn spent the rest of his career in the company, from 1929 as director of the sales and marketing department and from 1948 to 1968 as co-owner.

In the 1930s he was a member of Nasjonal Samling. He left the party in the 1937 party split, continuing though in the Ragnarok group around national socialist Hans S. Jacobsen, and edited the magazine Ragnarok in 1940. In 1940, however, Norway was invaded and occupied by Nazi Germany. Engelschiøn joined the resistance movement and was the head of intelligence in Milorg's District 13, Division 3 (Asker and Bærum) from 1943 to 1945. He received the Defence Medal 1940–1945 with rosette.

Engelschiøn chaired the Norwegian Genealogical Society from 1957 to 1968, and thereafter served as deputy chairman. He was also a bibliophile, chairing Bibliofilklubben twice as well as the contest jury for the Most Beautiful Book of the Year. Engelschiøn also issued a crime novel under a pseudonym.

He resided in Bærum. He died in 1982 and was buried at Haslum.

Cultural offices
Preceded by Wilhelm Munthe	Chairman of the Norwegian Genealogical Society; 1957–1968	Succeeded by C. S. Schilbred
