= Gerhard Munthe =

Norwegian painter and illustrator (1849–1929)

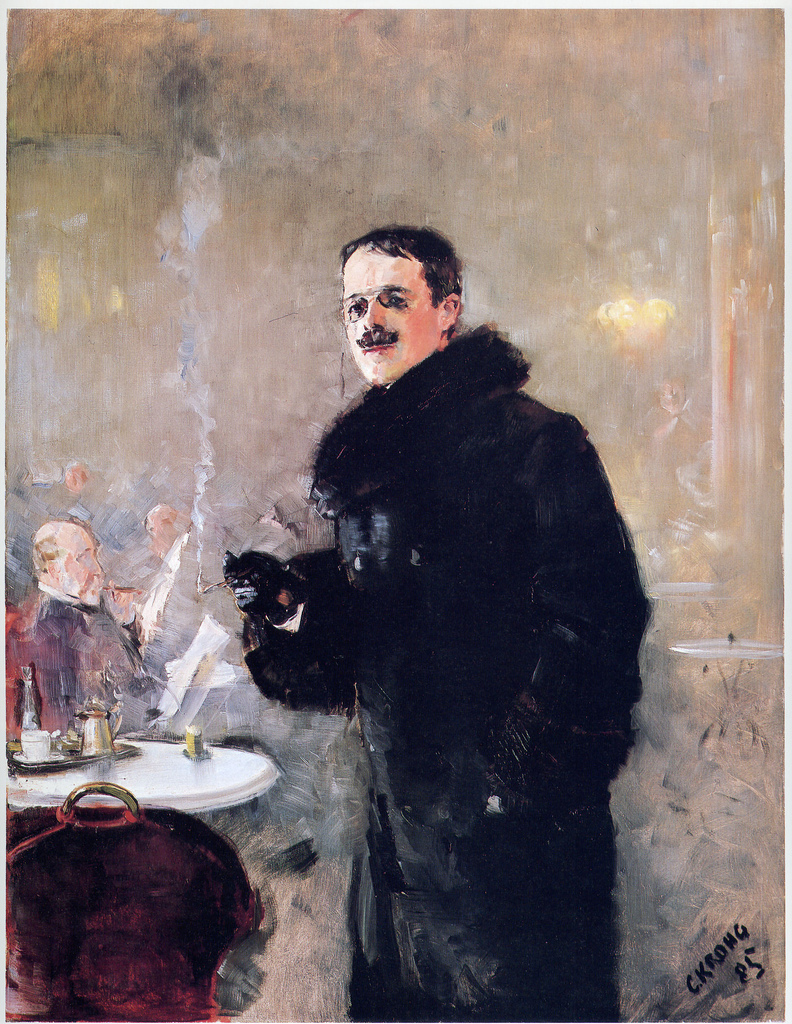
Gerhard Munthe, painted by Christian Krohg (1885)

Gerhard Peter Frantz Munthe (19 July 1849 in Elverum, Hedmark – 15 January 1929 in Lysaker, Bærum) was a Norwegian painter and illustrator.

== Background ==
Munthe was born in Elverum to physician Christopher Pavels Munthe (1816–1884) and his wife Christine Margrethe Pavels Aabel (1827–1887).

He was a brother of writer Margrethe Munthe and historians and military officers Hartvig Andreas Munthe and Carl Oscar Munthe. He was also a nephew of historian and cartographer Gerhard Munthe and an uncle of genealogist Christopher Morgenstierne Munthe, librarian Wilhelm Munthe, and painter Lagertha Munthe. Through his mother he was a nephew of Andreas Leigh Aabel and Oluf Andreas Aabel, and a first cousin of Hauk Aabel.

== Personal life ==
In December 1886 he married Sigrun Sandberg (1869–1957). Between 1886 and 1890 Bjørn Bjørnson was his stepfather-in-law. Munthe and Sandberg settled in Sandvika and later Lysaker. Also, Munthe had a studio at Ringstabekk for a short period. The couple divorced in 1919, the same year she married Fridtjof Nansen. Munthe was a prolific letter writer, and also published several articles, some of which were collected and published in 1919 as Minder og meninger (English: Memories and opinions).

== Career ==
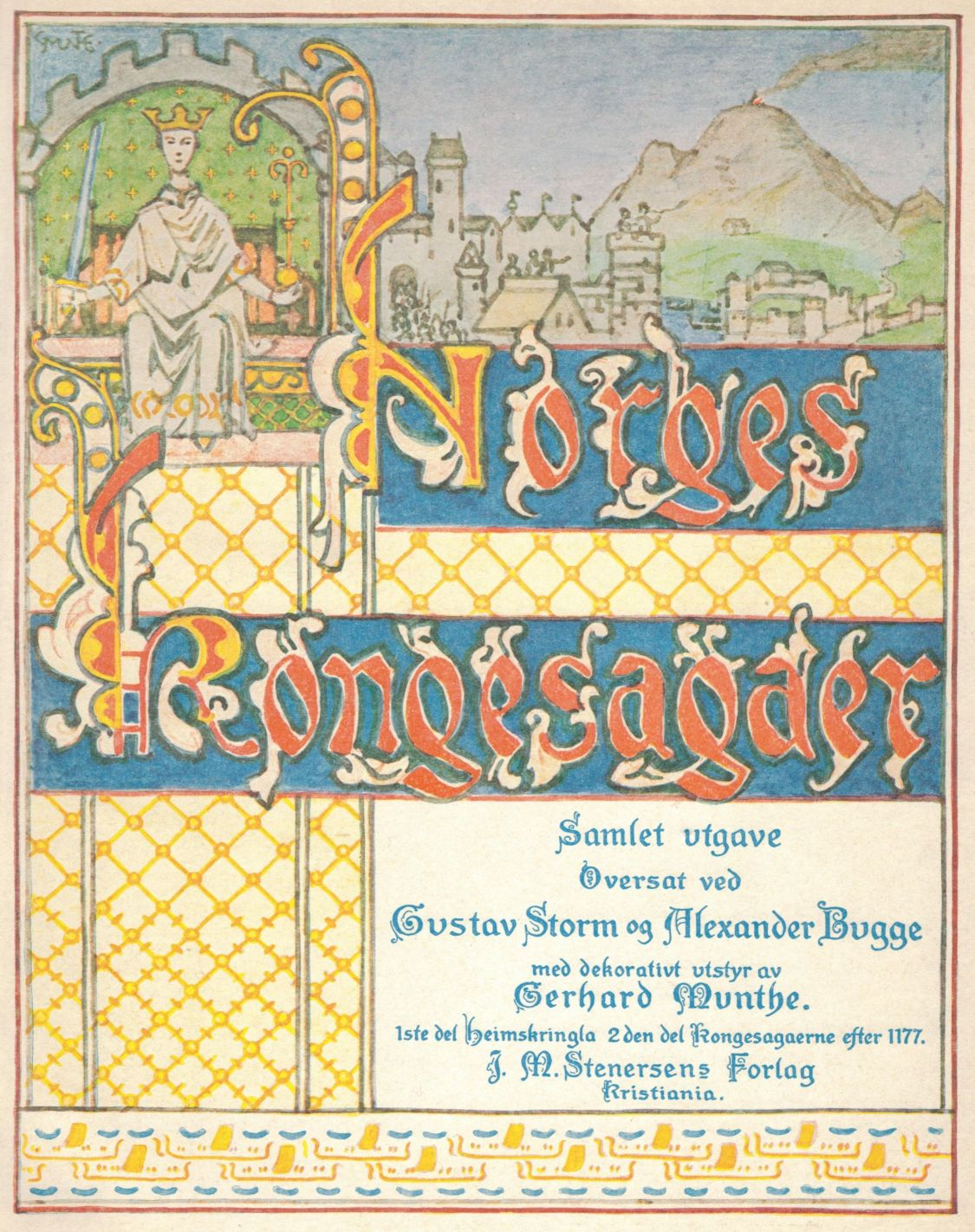
Norges kongesagaer illustrated by Gerhard Munthe (1914)

When Munthe moved to Christiania in 1863, his intention was to study medicine like his father, but his father advised him to take up the arts. He studied under Johan Fredrik Eckersberg in 1870, and continued under Morten Müller and Knud Bergslien until 1874. Between 1874 and 1876 he studied under Andreas Achenbach and his third cousin Ludvig Munthe in Düsseldorf. From 1877 to 1882 he lived in Munich most of the time. However, many of his motifs were taken from Norway. At this time he painted in the naturalist style. He is represented with several works in the National Gallery of Norway. Internationally he took part at the Exposition Universelle of 1900, the Louisiana Purchase Exposition of 1904, and elsewhere.

From the 1890s he experimented with decorative art in the Arts and Crafts style. From 1896 to 1899 he was occupied with illustrating the works of Snorri Sturluson, together with Erik Werenskiold, whom he had met in Munich. Some of his works were woven into large tapestries, notably by Ragna Breivik, whose work he particularly admired.

He also created monumental decorations, some of which have been lost, as was his house at Lysaker which was consumed by fire in 1982.

Munthe was a member of the selection committee at Høstutstillingen from its start in 1882 to 1890. He was a member of the board of the National Gallery of Norway from 1892 to 1905 and Den norske Husflidsforening from 1897 to his death, and chair of the National Gallery from 1905 to 1907. He was made a Commander of the Royal Norwegian Order of St. Olav, and a Knight of the Danish Order of the Dannebrog and the Swedish Order of the Polar Star. He died in Bærum, but was buried in Elverum.

== Gallery ==
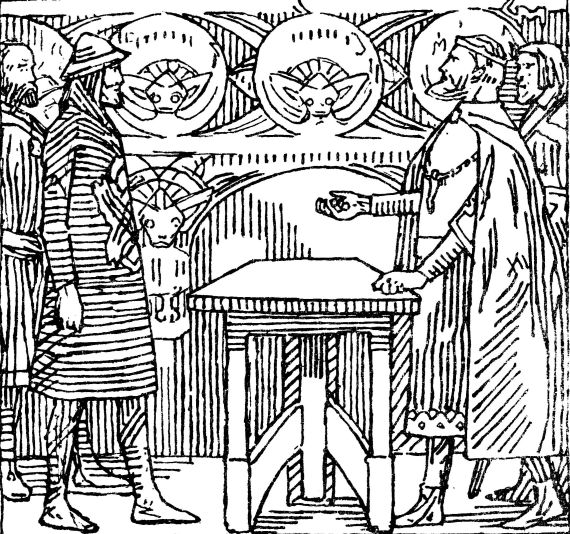
Kongane kastar terningar om ei bygd på Hisingen (The kings throw dice over a village in Hisingen)

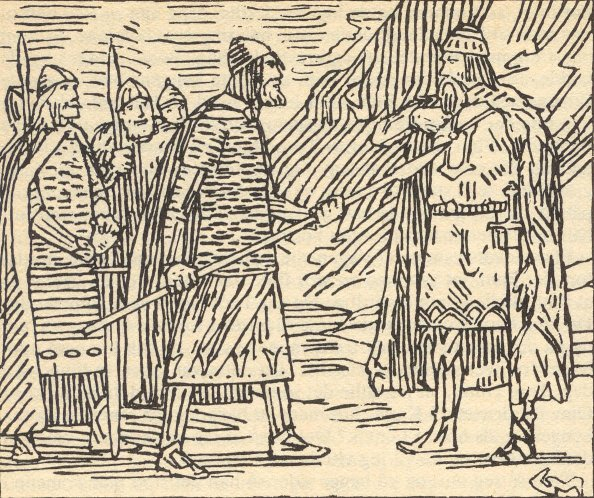
Finn Arnesson set spydodden for brystet på Tore Hund
(Finn Arnesson set spear point on the chest of Tore Hund)

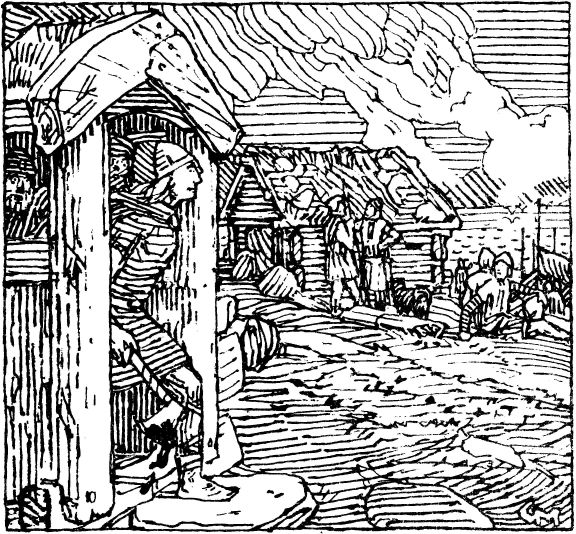
Torkjell Fostre etter at han har drepe Einar jarl (Torkjell Fostre after he has killed earl Einar)

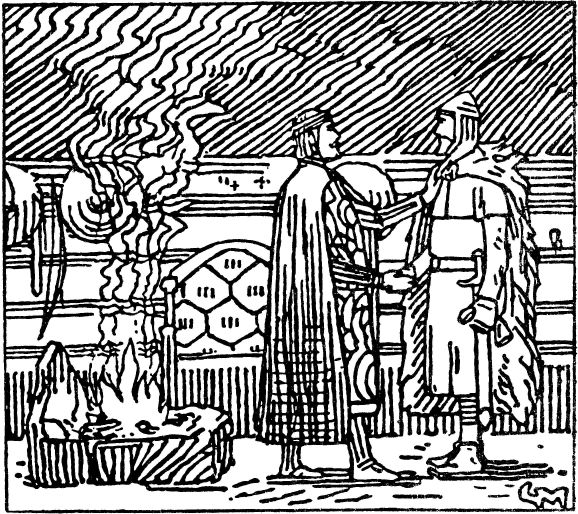
Kong Olav sender Karle på Bjarmelandsferd
(King Olaf sends Karl to Bjarmelandsferd)

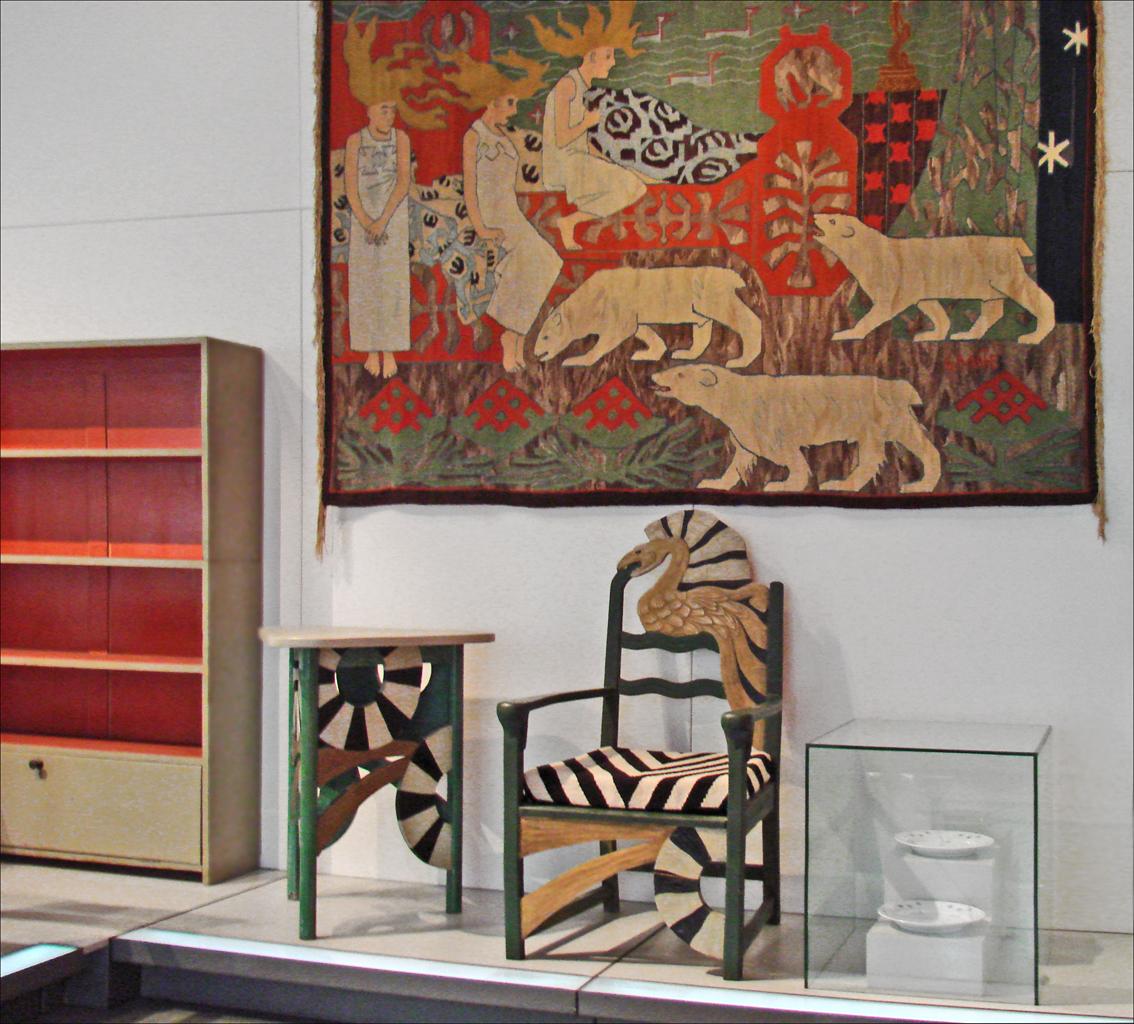
Tapestry by Munthe, "Daughters of the Northern Lights" made in 1897
