= Otto von Munthe af Morgenstierne =

Danish historian

Bredo Otto Anton von Munthe af Morgenstierne (6 March 1871, in Copenhagen – 20 May 1945, in Copenhagen) was a Danish historian of nobility and history of architecture.

He was the son of Captain Otto Ludvig Michael von Munthe af Morgenstierne (1831–1899) and Baroness Anna Helene Mariane Løvenskiold (1839–1921), and graduated as cand. jur. in 1898. He became a Knight of the Order of the Dannebrog in 1931. He inherited Det Munthe-Morgenstierne-Løvenskiold'ske Fideikommis in 1921, and was chairman of the Urne Endowment from 1919.

He wrote on the history of nobility and on history of architecture, and published books on Nicolai Eigtved (1924), Odd Fellow Palæet in Copenhagen (1926) and Field Marshal Michael Numsen i 1938. He also wrote on the position of the Norwegian nobility compared to the Danish nobility (Personalhistorisk Tidsskrift, Vol. 9, I, 1929), where he defended Danmarks Adels Aarbog against criticism from Norwegian historians.

He married Ella Caroline Hinrichsen and secondly from 1917 Martha Marie Paus (b. 1876 i Christiania), daughter of Ole Paus (1846–1931) and Birgitte Halvordine Schou (1848–1923).

A painting of him by Count Preben Knuth (1937) and a miniature by Svend Rønne (1920) exist.
