= Ole Colbjørnsen =

Norwegian journalist, economist and politician

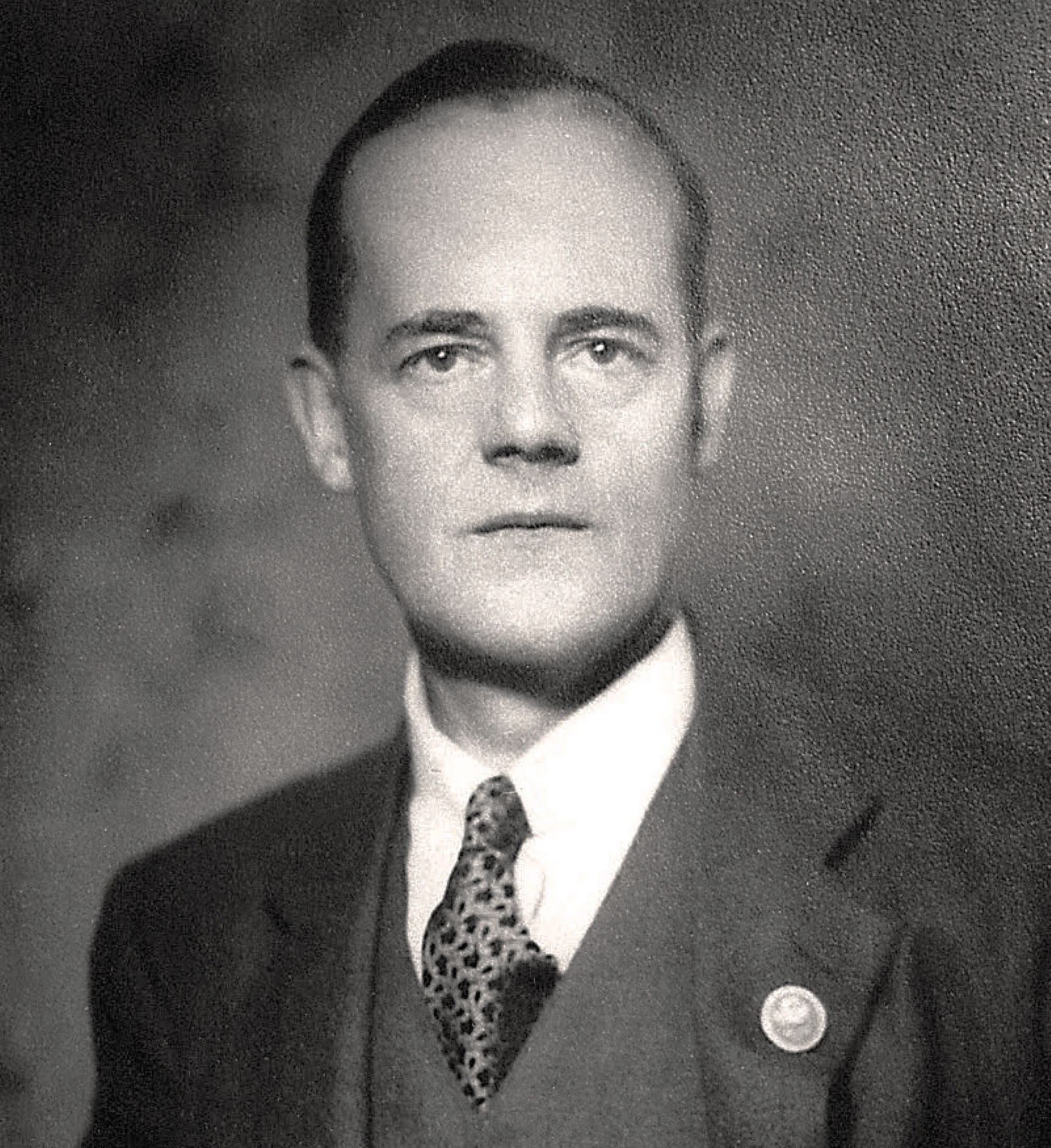
Ole Colbjørnsen

Ole Colbjørnsen (30 May 1897, Vegaardsheien, Nedenes – 12 November 1973) was a Norwegian journalist, economist and Labour Party politician.

== Early life and career ==
He was born in Vegaardsheien Municipality as a son of Torjus Taxeraas (1859–1918) and Marie Colbjørnsen (1869–1958). He took his examen artium in Arendal before turning 18 years old, and enrolled as a student in 1915. He studies natural sciences, and got work as an assistant of professors Carl Størmer and Lars Vegard. He also joined the Norwegian Labour Party while studying, and became involved in politics. He identified as a communist, and became interested in working for the Soviet Union. From 1921 he worked in the state news agency Russian Telegraph Agency (ROSTA), and from 1922 to 1928 he worked with trade and finance for the Soviet Union. Eventually he worked with organizing and preparing the first five-year plan. From 1929 to 1931 he headed a shipping company based in London, working with Soviet timber exports.

== Career in Norway ==
In 1931 he returned to Norway. He worked as a financial journalist in the Labour Party's newspaper Arbeiderbladet from the autumn of 1932. The chief editor of Arbeiderbladet, Martin Tranmæl, was also a prominent party member. As Colbjørnsen broadcast new economic ideas through his articles, among others inspired by John Maynard Keynes and William Beveridge, he too became more involved in the Labour Party. He was invited to the Labour Party national convention of 1933, where he showcased a number of reform proposals. In the same year he wrote the pamphlet Hele folket i arbeid, which also became the party slogan. In 1934 he issued the document En norsk treårsplan together with Axel Sømme. In it, the authors laid out reforms for a three-year economic plan. Colbjørnsen has been called "Norway's first plan economist". The Labour Party had tried a radical and revolutionary tactic ahead of the 1930 general election, but suffered a defeat there. Historians generally agree that from this point, the Labour Party decisively drifted away from the revolutionary rhetoric and policies. Colbjørnsen and Sømme helped build a new political platform. First, they helped shift the labour movement's focus from redistribution to production. Second, they helped create acceptance for doing this within the framework of the state, earlier lambasted as bourgeois.

In 1935, the Labour Party prevailed and formed a Cabinet led by Johan Nygaardsvold. Colbjørnsen did not become involved in this cabinet, but in the same year he became a member of Trustlovkomiteen av 1935 and the important Tiltakskommisjonen av 1935, whose goal was to battle unemployment. He was a board member of the Norwegian Industrial Bank from 1936, and chairman from 1938 to 1940. Following the 1936 general election he became as a deputy representative to the Parliament of Norway, representing the constituency Oslo, and he met on a regular basis because Oscar Torp was a cabinet member. He was one of the most pro-military politicians in the Labour Party before 1940.

In the late 1930s he repeatedly nominated Mahatma Gandhi for the Nobel peace prize, which never was awarded to him.

Colbjørnsen had to leave Norway when World War II reached the country in 1940. He worked at the Norwegian embassy in Washington, D.C. In 1946 he was a delegate and in 1947 an advisor in the United Nations General Assembly, and in 1947 he participated in the United Nations Economic and Social Council assembly. He became a supporter of Norwegian membership in NATO.

Colbjørnsen returned to Norway in November 1948 to become acting director of the Direktoratet for økonomisk forsvarsberedskap, a directorate which does not exist anymore. After a period there led a quiet life. He had married Veslemøy Ihlen Larssen in 1936, and was a son-in-law of Olav Johan Sopp. He died in November 1973 in Oslo.
