= Norwegian Genealogical Society =

Genealogical society in Oslo, Norway

Norwegian Genealogical Society (Norwegian: Norsk Slektshistorisk Forening, NSF) is a genealogical society in Oslo, Norway.

It was founded on 22 October 1926 as the first exclusively Norwegian genealogical society. Among the founders were Stian Herlofsen Finne-Grønn, Christoffer Morgenstierne Munthe and Sigurd Segelcke Meidell. The two former had already published the periodical Norsk tidsskrift for genealogi, personalhistorie, biografi og litteraturhistorie since 1906; in 1927 the Norwegian Genealogical Society launched Norsk slektshistorisk tidsskrift as its official periodical. Their internal magazine is Genealogen. The organization also runs a genealogical library.

== List of leaders ==
This is a list of leaders of the organization:

- 1926–1929 : Stian Herlofsen Finne-Grønn
- 1929–1940 : Halvdan Koht
- 1940–1943 : Sigurd Segelcke Meidell
- 1943–1952 : Theodor Bull
- 1952–1957 : Wilhelm Munthe
- 1957–1968 : Otto Sverdrup Engelschiøn
- 1968–1980 : Cornelius Severin Scheel Schilbred
- 1980–1991 : Per Seland
- 1991–1995 : Niels Christian Hjorth
- 1995–1999 : Tore Stenberg Falch
- 1999–2007 : Lars Løberg
- 2007–present : Håvard Blom
