= Bolteløkka =

Neighborhood in Oslo, Norway

Coordinates: 59°55′43″N 10°44′07″E

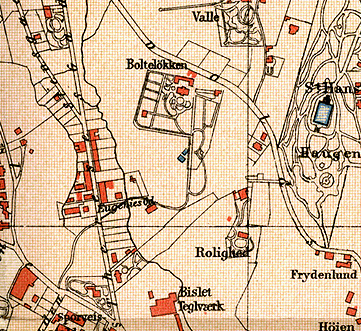
Map from 1887

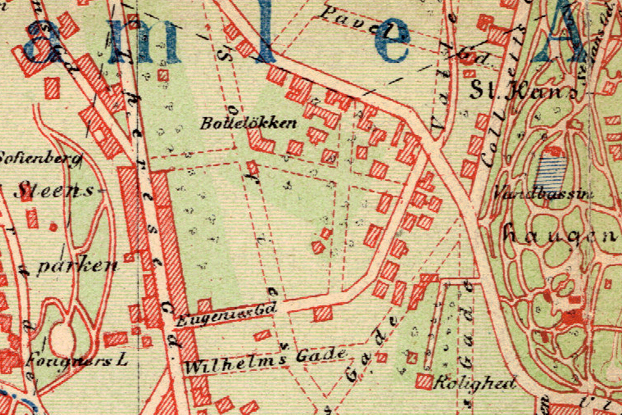
Map from 1900

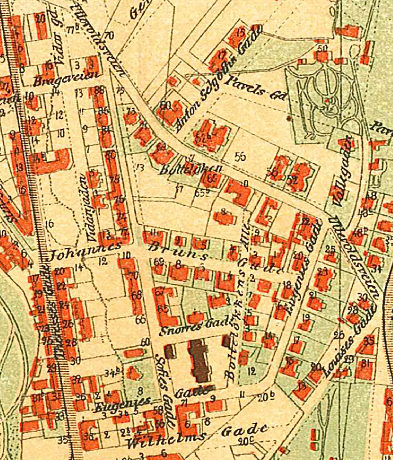
Map from 1917

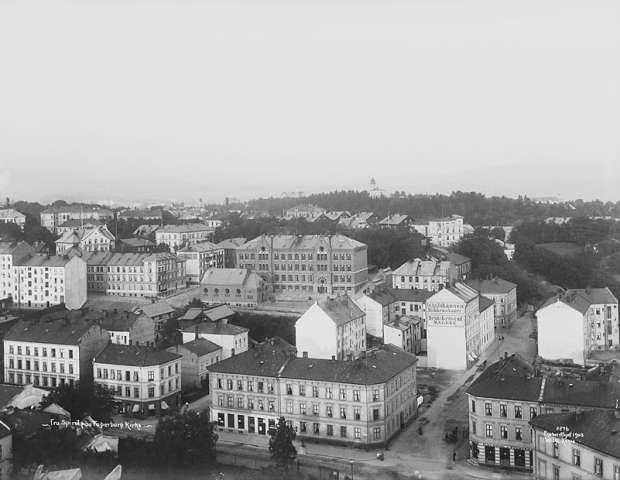
View of the neighbourhood from Fagerborg Church in 1903

Bolteløkka is a neighbourhood in the borough St. Hanshaugen in Oslo, Norway. The neighbourhood is named after proprietor David Bolt. The Bolteløkka primary school was finished in 1898.
