= Edvard Isak Hambro Bull =

Norwegian physician (1845–1925)

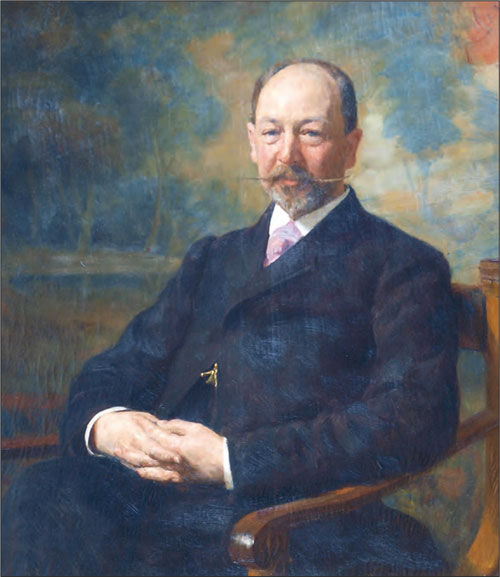
- Portrait of Edvard Isak Hambro Bull by Erik Werenskiold
- Born: 30 June 1845; Bergen, Norway
- Died: 5 June 1925 (aged 79); Oslo
- Occupation: Physician
- Children: Theodor Bull; Edvard Bull Sr. Johan Peter Bull; Francis Bull

Edvard Isak Hambro Bull (30 June 1845 – 5 June 1925) was a Norwegian physician.

== Personal life ==
He was born in Bergen, Norway to physician Johan Randulf Bull (1815–94) and Theodora Josephine Marie Hambro (1818–49). In 1869, he married Gine Falsen (1846–1879). After her death in 1880, he married Ida Marie Sophie Paludan (1861–1957). He was the father of Theodor Bull, Edvard Bull Sr., Johan Peter Bull and Francis Bull.

== Career ==
Bull graduated as cand.med. in 1868, and as dr.med. in 1875. Bull was an accomplished university teacher and a very active clinical researcher. He practiced as physician in Christiania (now Oslo) from 1870, and lectured at Rikshospitalet (now Oslo University Hospital, Rikshospitalet). From 1889 he was assigned a position as the theater doctor at Christiania Theater, and from 1899 at Nationaltheatret until his death in 1925. He also chaired the board of Nationaltheatret from 1908 to 1911.

His medical works include Om kunstige ernæringsmetoders anvendelse from 1883, Om kvindens helbred from 1885, and Om hysteri from 1887. He also wrote the travelogues Breve fra en ældre herre from 1900, Fra Alperne og Provence (1901), and Over lave og høie Fjelde from 1907.
