= Axel Sømme =

Norwegian educator, economist and geographer

- Born: 19 April 1899; Stavanger, Norway
- Died: 14 July 1991 (aged 92); Bergen
- Education: University of Oslo
- Occupations: Educator, economist and geographer, magazine editor and newspaper editor
- Employer: Norwegian School of Economics

Axel Christian Zetlitz Sømme (19 April 1899 – 14 July 1991) was a Norwegian educator, economist and geographer. During the 1920s, he was a political activist, magazine editor and newspaper editor.

== Biography ==
He was born in Stavanger, Norway. His parents were Andreas Sømme (1849–1937) and Maren Sophie Berner (1858–1946). His father was a shipowner who was a grandson of Jacob Kielland (1788–1863), one of the largest merchants in Stavanger. His uncle, Jacob Kielland Sømme (1862–1950), was a noted artist.

He attended Stavanger Cathedral School graduating in 1917. He received his cand.philol. at the University of Oslo in 1924. As a student he was politically active in the Mot Dag movement and edited the magazine Mot Dag in 1921. He was the first editor of the newspaper Rjukan Arbeiderblad. In this position he was sentenced to 30 days imprisonment for publishing articles encouraging the 1924 military strike.

Between 1927 and 1929, he completed secondary studies in economics at Paris and became Dr. Philos. in 1931 on the basis on his dissertation La Lorraine métallurgique. From 1925 to 1932, Sømme was a teacher at Oslo Handelsgymnasium and then a lecturer and principal of Genèveskolen in Geneva (Nordisk folkehøyskole i Genève) from 1932 to 1935. He became a lecturer in trade geography when the Norwegian School of Economics in Bergen opened in 1936. He was appointed professor at the Norwegian School of Economics from 1948 to 1969.

Among his most important scientific works was Jordbrukets geografi i Norge which was published in two volumes (J.W. Eides Forlag, 1949 and 1954).

== Personal life ==
He was married twice. In 1927 he married Gabrielle Kielland Holst (1899–1952), the marriage dissolved in 1939. In 1945, he married Johanne Wilhelmine Barclay Nitter (1904–1999). Axel Sømme died during 1991 in Bergen, Norway.

== Selected works ==
- Verdensøkonomiens pulsårer, 1931
- Skogen i Norge. Med et tillegg om treforedlingsindustrien, 1932
- En norsk 3-årsplan. Veien frem til en socialistisk planøkonomi i Norge (with Ole Colbjørnsen), 1933
- Jordbruket i Norge, 1933
- Fiskernes vei til bedre kår, 1935
- Varer og veier i verdenshandelen i mellomkrigstiden (with Tore Ouren), 1948
- Fjellbygd og feriefjell, 1965
