= Holm Hansen Munthe =

Norwegian architect (1848–1898)

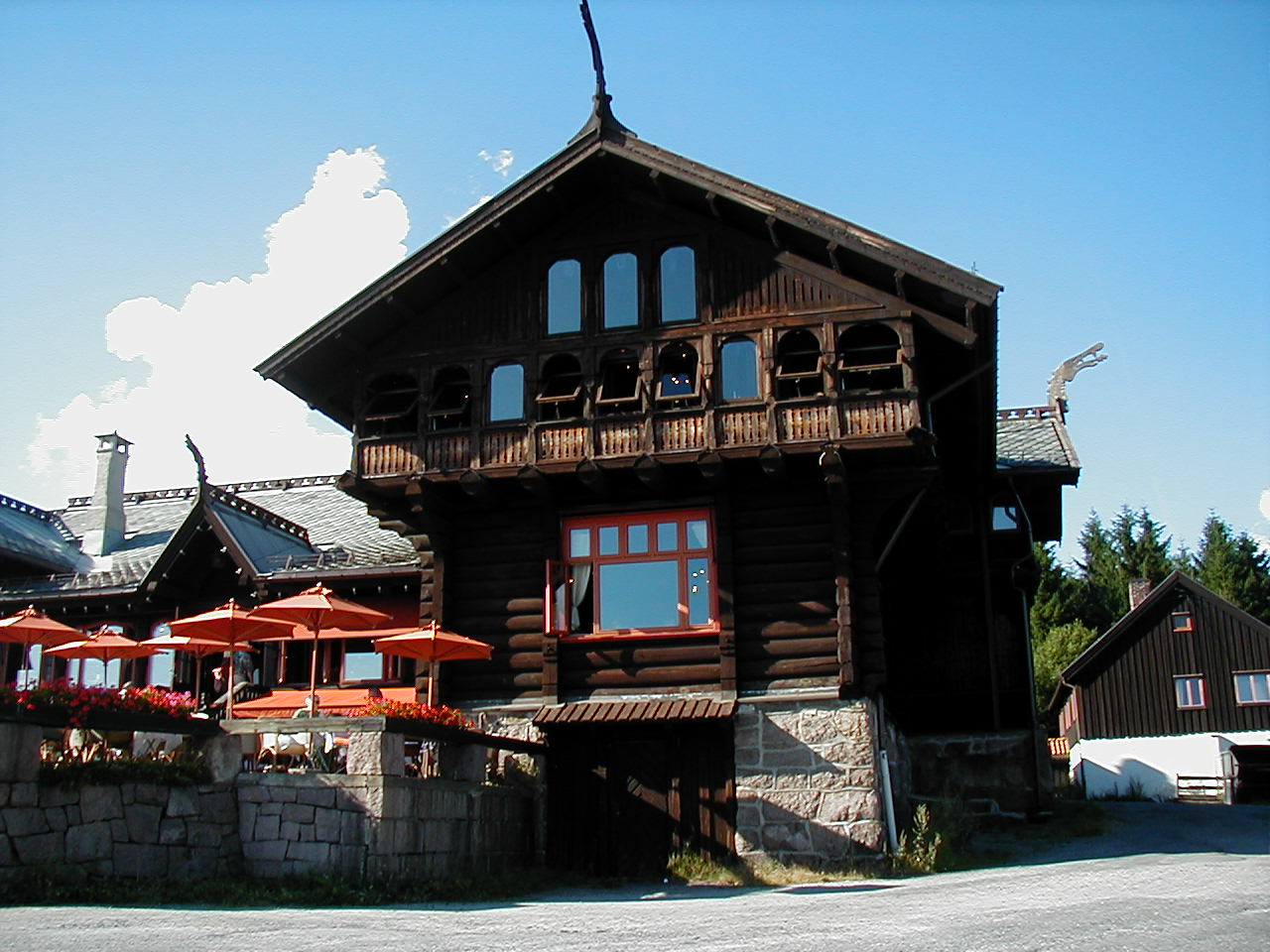
Frognerseteren restaurant

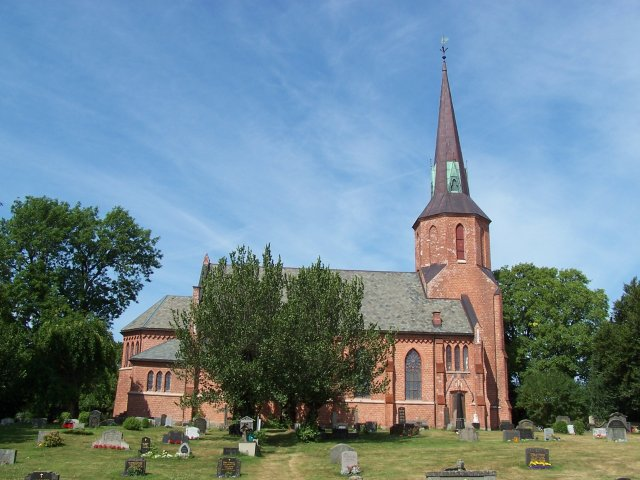
Vestby Church, cooperation with Henrik Nissen

Holm Hansen Munthe (1 January 1848 – 23 May 1898) was a Norwegian architect. He was a leading representative of dragon style architecture (Dragestil) which originated in Norway and was widely used principally between 1880 and 1910.

== Biography ==
Holm Hansen Munthe was born at Stange Municipality in Hedmark, Norway. He was the son of Adolph Frederik Munthe (1817–1884) and Karen Emilie Hansen (1820–1884). His father was a military officer and government official. In the early 1870s, he was an apprentice in Christiania (now Oslo) and a student at the drawing school of Wilhelm von Hanno. He graduated from Hannover Polytechnikum in 1877.

He was assistant of architect Conrad Wilhelm Hase before returning to Norway in 1878. Between 1878 and 1885 he cooperated with Henrik Nissen. From 1889 he worked for the Holmenkol-Voxenkol, a joint-stock company with major investors including resort operator Dr. Ingebrigt Christian Holm (1844-1918), brewery owner Ellef Ringnes (1842-1929) and wholesaler Alfred Larsen (1863-1950). The company was principally involved in developments in the neighborhood of Holmenkollena in Vestre Aker.

Munthe designed a number of structures in dragestil architectural style as part of this development including the well-known Frognerseteren Restaurant from 1890 and the Holmenkollen Turisthotell, which was built in 1889, but burned in 1895.

Emperor Wilhelm II of Germany, vacationing in Norway, noticed these buildings and commissioned the erection of his Rominten Hunting Lodge in East Prussia; however these buildings were largely destroyed after World War II, remnants of the Lodge are used as the seat of the administration at the Kaliningrad Central Park.

In 1898 Munthe was appointed city architect in Oslo, but he died before actually assuming office. He was buried at Vår Frelsers gravlund in Oslo.

== Selected works ==
- Vestby Church (1885)
- Brattvær Church (1885)
- Holmenkollen Turisthotell (1889-90, burned 1895)
- Frognerseteren restaurant (1891, re-built 1909)
- Bolteløkka School (1898)
- Lilleborg School (1898)
