= Johan Peter Bull =

Norwegian theatre director (1883–1960)

Johan Peter Bull (3 August 1883 – 16 September 1960) was a Norwegian theatre worker. He was appointed at the National Theatre of Norway from 1909 to 1950 in various administrative positions, including secretary and stage director. He was the brother of literary historian Francis Bull, and politician Edvard Bull. He founded a Theatre Museum in Oslo, and was an Honorary member of the Norwegian Actors' Equity Association.
