= Gerhard Munthe (cartographer) =

Norwegian military officer, historian and cartographer

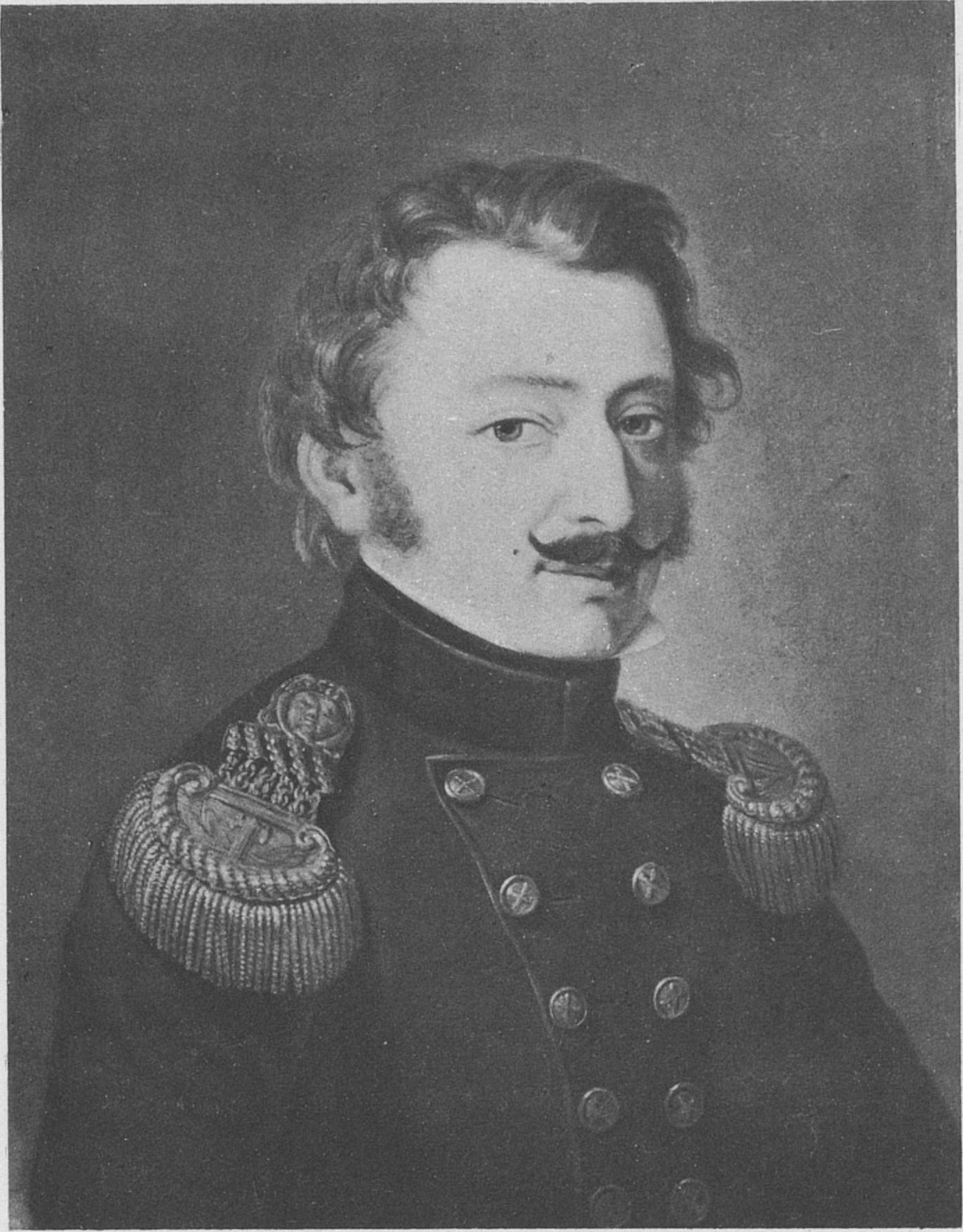
- Gerhard Munthe; by Johannes Flintoe (c. 1817)
- Born: 4 January 1795; Hafslo, Norway
- Died: 15 December 1876 (aged 81) Luster, Norway
- Allegiance: Norway
- Branch: Norwegian Army
- Service years: 1811–1830
- Rank: Captain
- Conflicts: Swedish-Norwegian War (1814)
- Other work: Historian, cartographer, instructor, farmer

Gerhard Munthe (4 January 1795, Hafslo – 15 December 1876, Luster) was a Norwegian military officer, historian and cartographer.

== Biography ==
He was born to Major Hartvig Kaas Munthe (1766–1830) and his wife, Bolette Christine, née Pavels (1774–1861), the daughter of a minister. He began attending the war school in Christiania (Oslo) in 1807 and was commissioned as a Second Lieutenant in 1811. That same year, he was retained by the Norwegian Mapping and Cadastre Authority. In 1814, he became a First Lieutenant and participated in the Swedish-Norwegian War as a cartographer; mapping the battlefields near Kongsvinger. The following year, he was part of a geographical survey team charged with creating a large topographical map of Scandinavia. In 1825, he became Captain of the Bergen Infantry Brigade, but had to resign his commission in 1830, due to problems with his eyesight.

From 1816 to 1841, he was also an instructor at the Norwegian Military Academy, where he taught drawing and calligraphy. In 1836, he became Director of the manuscript collection at the University of Christiania. During this time, he wrote geographical notes for a translation of the Heimskringla by Jacob Aall. The visual problems that caused him to resign from the service continued to bother him so, from 1841 until his death, he made his living as a farmer at the family home in Sogn. Many artists were regular visitors there, including his nephew, also named Gerhard Munthe.

He is probably best remembered for the trips he made with the artist, Johannes Flintoe, through the Norwegian mountains. The first, in 1819, followed a little known route that had recently been explored by the cartographer, Wilhelm Maximilian Carpelan. In the summer of 1822, he and Flintoe made a second trip, to Hardanger. During the trip, they were joined by the botanist, Matthias Numsen Blytt and the architect, Hans Ditlev Franciscus von Linstow.

He was married four times; to Thora Hansen (1810–1842), then to her sister, Ragnhild Susanne Hansen (1812–1853), followed by Catharine Pauline Suhrland (1823–1869) and Dora Kiønig (1837–1927). In addition to his nephew Gerhard, several other nephews and nieces were famous; notably the engineer, Hartvig Andreas Munthe, the writer, Margrethe Munthe, and the historian, Carl Oscar Munthe.
