= Karl Sigwald Johannes Bull =

Norwegian military officer and politician (1860–1934)

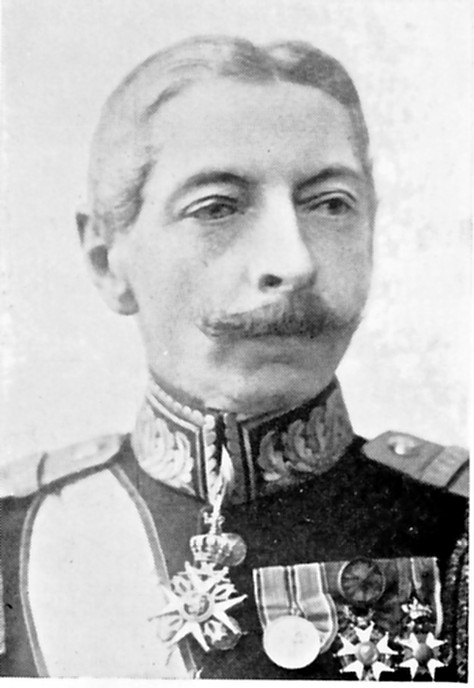

Minister of Defence
- In office 2 February 1910 – 20 February 1912
- Prime Minister: Wollert Konow
- Preceded by: August Spørck
- Succeeded by: Jens Bratlie

Personal details
- Born: Karl Sigwald Johannes Bull; 30 June 1860 Christiania, Sweden-Norway
- Died: 27 December 1936 (aged 76)
- Party: Conservative
- Spouse: Ella Kristine Falck (m. 1891)
- Children: Georg Jacob Falck Bull

Military service
- Allegiance: Norway
- Branch/service: Norwegian Army
- Years of service: 1880–1928
- Rank: Colonel

Karl Sigwald Johannes Bull (30 June 1860 – 27 December 1936) was a Norwegian military officer and politician for the Conservative Party. He is best known as the Norwegian Minister of Defence from 1910 to 1912.

== Personal life ==
He was born on 30 June 1860, in Kristiania, the son of military officer and politician Anders Sandøe Ørsted Bull and his wife Caroline Elisabeth Dahl. Also, he was a grandson of Supreme Court Justice Georg Jacob Bull, a great-grandson of Chief Justice Johan Randulf Bull, a great-grandnephew of Johan Lausen Bull and a first cousin of chief physician Edvard Isak Hambro Bull. His son Georg Jacob Falck Bull (1892–1977) became a major general.

== Career ==
He graduated from officer's school in 1880, held the rank of second lieutenant from 1880 and premier lieutenant from 1883. In 1889, he was promoted to captain. He worked for the Norwegian Mapping and Cadastre Authority (then known as Den geografiske opmaaling) from 1889 to 1891, and as a teacher at the Norwegian Military College from 1891 to 1907. He was known as a writer of military literature. From 1905, Bull held the rank of lieutenant colonel in the army, and at the Negotiations in Karlstad in the same year, he was present as a Norwegian military representative.

On 2 February 1910, when the cabinet Konow assumed office, Bull was appointed as the new Minister of Defence. He held this position until 19 February 1912, when the cabinet resigned. He returned to his military career. In 1911, he had been promoted to colonel and chief of the Fourth Infantry Regiment of East Akershus. He died on 27 December 1936, aged 76.

Political offices
Preceded by August Geelmuyden Spørck	Norwegian Minister of Defence; 1910–1912	Succeeded by Jens Bratlie
