= Edvard Bull Jr. =

Norwegian professor and historian

Edvard Bull (22 November 1914 – 15 December 1986), Edvard Bull d.y. or Edvard Bull Jr. was a Norwegian professor and historian.

== Biography ==
He was born in Kristiania as the son of professor and politician Edvard Bull, Sr. and Lucie Juliane Antonette Voss 1886–1970). He was active member of the Workers' Youth League (AUF). During the occupation of Norway by Nazi Germany he was imprisoned and sent to labour work in Kirkenes, and later incarcerated at Grini.

He attended the University of Oslo and was appointed to the cand.philol. in 1939; dr.philos. in 1958. He was a lecturer in Oslo from 1939 to 1948, curator at the Norwegian Folk Museum from 1950 to 1962, professor of history at the Norwegian College of Teaching, (later the Norwegian University of Science and Technology) from 1963 to 1981 and rector there from 1966 to 1969.

He wrote a large number of articles and several books, in particular on social history and the history of the Norwegian labour movement. Among his books is volume one of Arbeiderbevegelsens historie i Norge a six-volume history series, published by Tiden Norsk Forlag between the years 1985–1990. He also wrote two volumes for Cappelens Norgeshistorie, the Cappelen series on Norwegian history: Volume 13 Klassekamp og fellesskap 1920-1945 and Volume 14 Norge i den rike verden tiden etter 1945.

== Personal life ==
He was married in 1939 to Andrea Nilsine Rockmann Olsen.

== Selected works ==
- Arbeiderklassen blir til. 1850–1900 ISBN 82-10-02751-4
- Retten til en fortid sosialhistoriske artikler ISBN 82-00-05720-8
- Norge i den rike verden tiden etter 1945 ISBN 82-02-03449-3
- Klassekamp og fellesskap 1920-1945 ISBN 82-02-15333-6
