= Oluf Andreas Aabel =

Norwegian priest and writer (1825–1895)

- Born: October 9, 1825; Sogndal, Nordre Bergenhus Country, Norway
- Occupation: Translator
- Children: Wilhelmine Margrethe Aabel
- Parents: Peder Pavels Aabel (father); Margrete Engelke Magdalene Leigh (mother)

Oluf Andreas Aabel (9 October 1825 – 24 December 1895) was a Norwegian priest and writer.

He was born in Sogndal as the son of priest Peter Pavels Aabel. He was a brother of Morten Andreas Leigh Aabel, and an uncle of Hauk Aabel.

He finished his secondary education at Christiania Cathedral School in 1843, and graduated with the cand.theol. degree in 1847. After graduation, he worked as a teacher; he was also a research fellow at the Royal Frederick University from 1851 to 1854, but did not pursue an academic career. He was instead hired as a curate in Land in 1857 and Sigdal Municipality in 1863. He then became vicar in Jevnaker Municipality in 1878 and in Søndre Land Municipality in 1897. In 1881 he was promoted to dean of Hadeland og Land prosti.

He translated Georg Benedikt Winer's Grammatik des neutestamentlichen Sprachidioms in 1852, and published a translation of the biblical work of Otto von Gerlach. He also published a work of his own, Omrids af Det christelige Troesindhold, which came in two editions in 1855 and 1864.
