= Wilhelm Munthe =

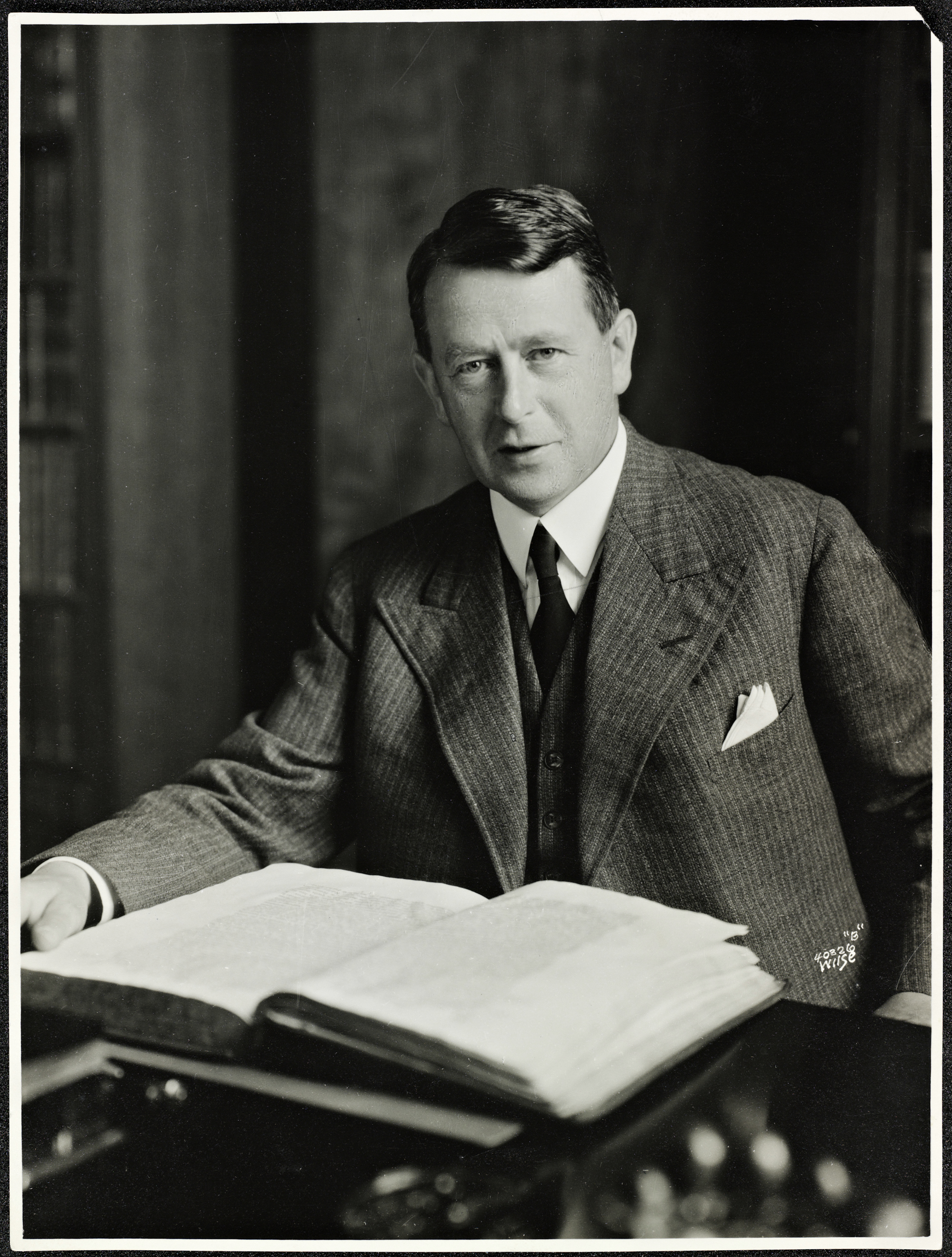
Wilhelm Munthe (1933)

Abraham Wilhelm Støren Munthe (20 October 1883 – 18 December 1965) was a Norwegian librarian and author. He worked at the University Library of Oslo from 1903 to 1953.

== Personal life ==
Munthe was born in Kristiania (now Oslo) as the son of Olaf Andreas Jens Wilhelm Munthe (1851–1914) and Helene Andrea Støren (1857–1939). In 1917, he married Jenny Hempel (1882–1975).

== Career ==
Munthe finished his examen artium at Kristiania Cathedral School in 1902. He worked for the University Library of Kristiania from 1903, first as a volunteer. He received the cand.philol. degree in 1911. He studied middle age palaeography and diplomatics at the University of Berlin from 1913 to 1914, and Old Norse handwritings at the libraries of Uppsala, Stockholm and Copenhagen from 1915 to 1916. From 1920 he was leader of the handwriting collection at the University Library of Oslo, and from 1922 he was appointed leader of the library, a position he held until he retired in 1953. Among Munthe's works are De norske bibliotekers historie from 1927, American Librarianship from a European Angle from 1939, Litterære falsknerier from 1942, and the 1947 essay Norwegian Libraries during the War. He co-edited the journal Nordisk tidskrift för bok- och biblioteksväsen for many years, and served as president of the International Federation of Library Associations and Institutions (IFLA) from 1947 to 1951.

Munthe chaired the Norwegian Trekking Association from 1940 to 1946, and the Norwegian Genealogical Society from 1952 to 1957, and received honorary degrees from the University of Toronto and University of Uppsala.

Munthe was appointed as a Commander of the Royal Norwegian Order of St. Olav (1953), of the Order of the Polar Star (Sweden), of the Order of the Dannebrog (Denmark) and of the Order of the White Rose of Finland.

Cultural offices
Preceded by Theodor Bull	Chairman of the Norwegian Genealogical Society; 1952–1957	Succeeded by Otto Sverdrup Engelschiøn
