= Bull (surname) =

Bull is a surname.

In addition to people bearing "Bull" as an Old World-derived surname, "Bull" has been part of the names of some Native Americans, in some cases as part of a traditional name of their respective cultures. Some of these, and some others, either have borne it as part of a legal surname or (with or without their assent) been treated as bearing it.

Those bearing Bull as a surname include:

== A ==
- Aksel-Otto Bull (born 1963), Norwegian theatre director
- Alfred E. Bull (1867–1930), American football player and coach
- Alyssa Bull (born 1995), Australian canoeist
- Amos Bull (1744–1825), American composer
- Amos Bad Heart Bull (c. 1868 – 1913), Oglala Lakota artist, son of Bad Heart Bull, passed that whole name on to both his sons in surname fashion
- Amy Bull (1877–1953), British suffragist and rural district councillor
- Anders Henrik Bull (1875–1956), Norwegian electrical engineer
- Anders Sandøe Ørsted Bull (1817–1907), Norwegian politician and mayor of Oslo
- Andy Bull, Australian singer-songwriter from Sydney
- Anthony Bull (1908–2004), British transport engineer and president of the Institute of Transport
- Arthur Bull (cricketer) (1892–1965), English cricketer
- Arthur Gilbert Bull (1890–1963), England rugby international player

== B ==
- Bart Bull, American writer, reporter, author, columnist, and critic
- Bartholomew Bull (1791–1879), immigrant and land owner in Upper Canada
- Bartle Bull (born 1970), American writer, magazine editor and journalist
- Bartle Bull (politician) (1902–1950), Canadian-British barrister and politician
- Ben Bull (born 1873), English footballer
- Benjamin Bull (1798–1879), American lawyer and politician
- Benjamin Pinto Bull (1916–2005), independence activist in Guinea-Bissau
- Bernard Bull (born 1971), American scholar and academic administrator
- Bernt Bull (born 1946), Norwegian politician for the Labour Party
- Birke Bull-Bischoff (born 1963), German politician
- Brynjulf Bull (1906–1993), Norwegian lawyer, Supreme Court advocate and politician
- Bull (Kent cricketer) (fl. 1871), English cricketer with unknown given name

== C ==
- Carla Bull (born 2002), Australian sprinter
- Cavinder Bull, Singaporean lawyer
- Cecil Robert Bull (1890–1978), Canadian politician
- Charles Bull (politician) (1846–1906), Australian politician and lawyer
- Charles Livingston Bull (1874–1932), American illustrator
- Charlie Bull (1909–1939), English cricketer
- Chloe Bull (born 1994), Welsh footballer
- Christian Bull (born 1996), Norwegian ice hockey player
- Christoph Bull (born 1966), German composer and musician
- Clarence Sinclair Bull (1896–1979), American portrait photographer
- Clive Bull (born 1959), English radio talk show host
- Cran Bull (born 1946), New Zealand cricketer and administrator

== D ==
- Dan Bull (born 1986), British rapper
- Dan Bull (politician), Australian politician and musician
- Daniel Bull (born 1980), Australian adventurer, mountain climber and professional speaker
- Dave Bull (bishop), British Anglican bishop
- David Bull (politician) (born 1969), English politician and television personality
- David Bull (craftsman) (born 1951), Canadian artist specializing in Japanese woodblock printmaking
- David Bull (Scouting) (born 1944), English former chairman of European Scout Region
- David Roger Bull (born 1957), English professor of electronic engineering
- Deborah Bull (born 1963), English dancer, writer, and broadcaster
- Dell Bull (born 1965), United States Navy officer
- Desmond Bull (1935–2015), Australian cricketer
- Dixie Bull (fl. 1630s), English sea captain and pirate
- Donald Bull, rugby union player who represented Australia
- Dontae Bull (born 1999), Canadian football player

== E ==
- Ed Bull, American professional stock car racing driver
- Edvard Bull, Sr. (1881–1932), Norwegian historian and politician
- Edvard Bull, Jr. (1914–1986), Norwegian historian
- Edvard Isak Hambro Bull (1845–1925), Norwegian physician
- Edvard Hagerup Bull (1855–1938), Norwegian judge and politician
- Edvard Hagerup Bull (composer) (1922–2012), Norwegian composer
- Edward Bull (c.1759–1798), English steam engine engineer
- Einar M. Bull (born 1942), Norwegian diplomat
- Eleanor Bull (1550–1596), owned establishment where Christopher Marlowe, the Elizabethan playwright and poet, died in 1593
- Ella Holm Bull (1929–2006), Southern Sámi teacher and author
- Elliott Ronald Bull (1942–1979), Aboriginal Australian artist
- Emma Bull (born 1954), American science fiction and fantasy author
- Emma Bull (art director), English director and creative consultant
- Ephraim Wales Bull (1806–1895), American farmer and politician, inventor of the Concord grape
- Eric Bull (1886–1954), Australian cricketer
- Everett L. Bull (born 1949), American computer scientist

== F ==
- Fran Bull (born 1938), American artist
- Francis Bull (1887–1974), Norwegian literary historian, professor at University of Oslo
- Frederick Bull (1875–1910), English cricketer who played for Essex
- Frederick Bull (Lord Mayor of London) (c. 1714–1784), British radical politician
- Fredrik Rosing Bull (1882–1925), Norwegian engineer and Information technology pioneer
- Fredrik Bull-Hansen (1927–2018), Norwegian military officer

== G ==
- Gary Bull (born 1966), English footballer
- Geoff Bull (born 1942), Australian jazz trumpeter and bandleader
- Geoffrey Bull (1921–1999), Scottish Christian missionary and author
- Geoffrey Bull (cricketer) (1912–1997), English cricketer
- Georg Andreas Bull (1829–1917), Norwegian architect and chief building inspector
- Georg Jacob Bull (1785–1854), Norwegian jurist and politician
- George Bull (1634–1710), English theologian and Bishop of St David's
- George Bull (British Army officer) (1877–1916), British brigadier-general
- George Bull (cricketer), English cricketer of the 1900s
- George Bull (journalist) (1929–2001), English translator, author and journalist
- George Stringer Bull (1799–1865), English cleric and social reformer
- Gerald Bull (1928–1990), Canadian engineer
- Graham MacGregor Bull (1918–1987), South African and British physician
- Grant Short Bull (c. 1851–1935), Lakota leader; passed Short Bull on to both his sons in surname fashion

== H ==
- Hank Bull (born 1949), Canadian artist and illusionist
- Hans Peter Bull (born 1936), German constitutional lawyer and jurist
- Harcourt Burland Bull (1824–1881), Canadian journalist and political figure
- Harold R. Bull (1893–1976), Assistant Chief of Staff, Supreme Headquarters Allied Expeditionary Force (SHAEF) under Dwight D. Eisenhower
- Hedley Bull (1932–1985), Australian-born political scientist
- Henrik Bull (1864–1953), Norwegian architect and designer
- Henrik Bull (judge) (born 1957), Norwegian judge
- Henrik H. Bull (1929–2013), a founder of Bull Stockwell Allen Architects in San Francisco
- Henrik Johan Bull, Norwegian businessman who patented the grenade-harpoon gun used for whaling
- Henry Bull (theologian) (died 1577), English Protestant writer
- Henry Bull (MP) (1630–1692), English member of parliament
- Henry Bull (settler) (1799–c. 1848), British Royal Navy officer and pioneer settler of the Swan River Colony in Australia
- Henry Bull (governor) (1610–1694), governor of Rhode Island, 1685–86, 1690
- Henry Bull (speaker) (1687–1774), speaker of the House of Deputies of the Colony of Rhode Island and Providence Plantations
- Henry Bull (cricketer) (1843–1905), English cricketer.
- Henry Graves Bull (1818–1885), British medical doctor, botanist and mycologist
- Hiram C. Bull (1820–1879), American politician

== I ==
- Ida Bull, Norwegian archivist and historian

== J ==
- Jacob Breda Bull (1853–1930), Norwegian author
- James G. Bull (1838–1927), mayor of Columbus, Ohio
- James J. Bull, Professor in Molecular Biology at the University of Texas at Austin
- James Bull (cricketer) (born 1976), English cricketer
- Jan Bull (1927–1985), Norwegian author and theater instructor
- Jasmine Bull (born 2002), English footballer
- Jens Bull (1886–1956), Norwegian jurist and diplomat
- Johan Bull (1893–1945), American painter
- Johan Lausen Bull (1751–1817), Norwegian jurist and politician
- Johan Peter Bull (1883–1960), Norwegian theatre worker
- Johan Randulf Bull (1749–1829), Norwegian judge
- John Bull (disambiguation), multiple people
  - John Bull (businessman) (1672–1742), English businessman and Sheriff of London
  - John Bull (composer) (c. 1562–1628), Baroque English composer and musician
  - John Bull (gunman) (1836–1929), gunman of the American Old West
  - John Bull (Missouri politician) (1803–1863), American politician from Missouri
  - John Bull (Pennsylvania politician) (1731–1824), American politician and military officer from Pennsylvania
  - John Bull (priest) (fl. 1826–1830), Archdeacon of Barnstaple
  - John Bull (prophet) (died 1642), English self-proclaimed prophet
  - John Bull (South Carolina politician) (c. 1740–1802), American statesman, Continental Congressman from South Carolina
  - John Edward Bull (1806–1901), British Army officer and public servant in New South Wales
  - John S. Bull (1934–2008), American pilot and astronaut
  - John Wrathall Bull (1804–1886), settler, inventor and colonial author of South Australia
- Josh Bull (born 1985), Australian politician

== K ==
- Karl Sigwald Johannes Bull, (1860–1936), Norwegian Minister of Defence from 1910 to 1912
- Kieran Bull (born 1995), Welsh cricketer
- Kirsti Strøm Bull (born 1945), Norwegian professor of law
- Kirstin Bull, Australian ultramarathoner and long-distance runner
- Knud Bull (1811–1889), Norwegian painter and counterfeiter
- Kjell Bull-Hansen (1923–1945), Norwegian resistance member

== L ==
- Leonard Bull (1935–2013), Kenyan sports shooter
- Les Bull (1901–1973), Australian rugby league footballer
- Leslie George Bull (1916–1944), British RAF pilot
- Lionel Bull (1889–1978), Australian veterinary scientist
- Lucien Bull (1876–1972), Irish-born French pioneer in chronophotography
- Lyder Bull (1881–1959), Norwegian civil servant
- Lyle F. Bull (1938–2018), American rear admiral

== M ==
- Marcus Bull (born 1962), British historian
- Marie Magdalene Bull (1827–1907), Norwegian actress and photographer
- Melville Bull (1854–1909), U.S. Representative from Rhode Island
- Mette Bull (1876–1946), Norwegian actress
- Michael Bull, British academic
- Micky Bull (1930–2011), English footballer
- Mike Bull (born 1946), pole vaulter and decathlete from Northern Ireland
- Moses Bull (1830–1896), American politician

== N ==
- Nathaniel Bull (1842–1911), Australian politician
- Nikki Bull (born 1981), English footballer
- Norma Bull (1906–1980), Australian artist

== O ==
- Obadiah Bull, Irish lawyer during the reign of Henry VII
- Odd Bull (1907–1991), Royal Norwegian Air Force officer
- Olaf Bull (1883–1933), Norwegian poet
- Ole Bull (1810–1880), Norwegian violinist
- Ole Bornemann Bull (physician) (1842–1916), Norwegian ophthalmologist
- Ole Jacob Bull (born 1948), Norwegian translator and cultural director

== P ==
- Peter Bull (1912–1984), British character actor
- Phil Bull (1910–1989), English professional gambler, racehorse owner and publisher

== R ==
- Ray Bull, British psychologist
- Reidar Bull (1909–1994), Norwegian judge
- René Bull (1872–1942), British illustrator and photographer
- Renee Bull (born 1993), American beauty pageant titleholder
- Richard Bull (actor) (1924–2014), American actor
- Richard Bull (aviator) (1914–1942), U.S. naval officer
- Richard S. Bull (1913–1942), U.S. naval officer, also an aviator
- Richard Bull (Australian politician) (born 1946), New South Wales politician
- Richard Bull (MP) (1721–1805), British politician
- Robert Bull (1778–1835), British Royal Horse Artillery officer who fought in the Napoleonic Wars
- Rolf Bull-Hansen (1888–1970), Norwegian educator and author
- Ronnie Bull (footballer) (born 1980), English footballer
- Ronnie Bull (American football) (born 1940), American football running back
- Roy Bull (1929–2004), Australian rugby player and coach

== S ==
- Sandy Bull (1941–2001), American folk musician
- Sara Chapman Bull (1850–1911), American writer and philanthropist
- Schak Bull (1858–1956), Norwegian architect
- Scott Bull (born 1953), American professional football player
- Silke Bull, East German sprint canoer
- Sir Stephen Bull, 2nd Baronet (1904–1942), English lawyer and baronet
- Steve Bull (born 1965), English footballer
- Storm Bull (musician) (1913–2007), American musician, composer and educator
- Storm Bull (1856–1907), Norwegian-American engineer and educator
- Sverre Hagerup Bull (1892–1976), Norwegian banker, composer and writer

== T ==
- Tas Bull (1932–2003), Australian trade union leader
- Ted Bull (1898–1967), Australian rower
- Theodor Bull (1870–1958), Norwegian businessperson and genealogist
- Thomas Bull (judge), Swedish jurist
- Thomas Bull (Pennsylvania politician) (1744–1837), American politician
- Thomas Bull (settler) (c.1605–1684), early settler in the Connecticut Colony
- Thomas K. Bull (died 1893), American politician from Pennsylvania
- Thomas Short Bull (born 1946), American politician from South Dakota
- Tim Bull (born 1966), Australian politician
- Tom Bull (1905–1976), Australian politician
- Tony Bull (footballer) (1930–2019), Australian rules footballer
- Tony Bull (wrestler), British wrestler
- Tove Bull (born 1945), Norwegian linguist
- Trevor Bull (1944–2009), British cyclist
- Trygve Bull (1905–1999), Norwegian lecturer and politician
- Tyson Bull (born 1993), Australian artistic gymnast

== V ==
- Vincents Stoltenberg Bull (1882–1935), Norwegian engineer
- Vika Bull and Linda Bull, Australian vocal duo performing as Vika and Linda

== W ==
- Walter Bull (died 1952), English football player and manager
- Wendy Lucas-Bull (born 1953), South African executive
- William Bull (diver) (1886–1970), British Olympic diver
- William Bull (governor) (1638–1755), landowner and politician in the Province of South Carolina
- William Bull II (1710–1791), lieutenant governor of the Province of South Carolina
- William Bull (minister) (1738–1814), English independent minister
- William Bull (botanist) (1828–1902), English botanist
- William Bull (landowner) (1867–1956), founder of Bilbul, a small town in New South Wales, Australia
- Sir William Bull, 1st Baronet (1863–1931), British solicitor and politician
- William Frederick Bull (1903–1993), Canadian diplomat
- William Ford Bull (1876–1941), American football player and coach
- William T. Bull (1865–1924), American football player and coach
- William L. Bull (1844–1914), American banker and president of the New York Stock Exchange
- William James Bull (1863–1931), 1st Baronet, British solicitor, Conservative politician, Member of Parliament

== People bearing Bull as part of a traditional Native-American name ==
- Sitting Bull (c. 1831 – 1890), Hunkpapa Sioux leader and performer
- Amos Bad Heart Bull (c. 1868 – 1913), Oglala Lakota artist and historian
- Grant Short Bull (c. 1851 – 1935), Oglala Lakota leader (he started being known, as an adult, with "Grant" before his traditional name, and passed "Short Bull" on in surname fashion in the male line of his descendants)
- Arnold Short Bull (c. 1845 – 1923), Sičháŋǧu (or Brulé) Lakota leader
- White Bull (Native American) (1849–1947), Sioux leader
