= David Bull =

David Bull may refer to:

- David Bull (art restorer) (1934–2024) English art conservator
- David Bull (craftsman) (born 1951), Canadian artist specializing in Japanese woodblock printmaking
- David Bull (politician) (born 1969), English politician and television personality
- David Bull (Scouting) (born 1944), English former chairman of European Scout Region
- David Roger Bull (born 1957), English professor of electronic engineering
- Dave Bull (bishop), British Anglican bishop
