= William Bull =

William Bull may refer to:

- William Bull (diver) (1886–1970), British Olympic diver
- William Bull (governor) (1638–1755), landowner and politician in the province of South Carolina
- William Bull II (1710–1791), lieutenant governor of the province of South Carolina
- William Bull (minister) (1738–1814), English independent minister
- William Bull (botanist) (1828–1902), English botanist
- William Bull (landowner) (1867–1956), founder of Bilbul, a small town in New South Wales, Australia
- Sir William Bull, 1st Baronet (1863–1931), British solicitor and politician
- William Frederick Bull (1903–1993), Canadian diplomat
- William Ford Bull (1876–1941), American football player and coach
- William T. Bull (1865–1924), American football player and coach
- William L. Bull (1844–1914), American banker and president of the New York Stock Exchange

== See also ==
- William "Bull" Nelson (1824–1862), American naval officer
- William "Bull" Halsey (1882–1959), American naval officer
- Bull (surname)
