= Stephen Bull =

Stephen Bull may refer to:

- Sir Stephen Bull, 2nd Baronet (1904–1942), English lawyer
- Stephen Medaris Bull, American inventor, mixed-media technologist, and media producer
- Steve Bull, (born 1965) English footballer
- Stephen Bull Fine Arts Elementary School

== See also ==
- Bull baronets
- Bull (surname)
