= Liberation Front of Portuguese Guinea and Cape Verde =

- Leader: Amilcar Cabral
- Founded: 1960
- Dissolved: Unknown
- Headquarters: Dakar
- Ideology: Communism; Marxism-Leninism; African nationalism African socialism Anti-imperialism; Left-wing nationalism
- Political position: Left-wing

The Liberation Front of Portuguese Guinea and Cape Verde (Portuguese: Frente de Libertação da Guiné Portuguesa e Cabo Verde, FLGC) was a militant political party in Guinea-Bissau, then part of Portuguese Guinea, formed to seek independence from Portugal.

It was established in Dakar in 1960 by Amilcar Cabral and Henri Labėry from an amalgamation of the Liberation Movement of Portuguese Guinea and the Cape Verde Islands (French:Mouvement de Liberation de la Guinee Portugaise et des Iles du Cap Vert, MLGCV) with other groups such as the Liberation Movement of Portuguese Guinea (Portuguese: Movimento de Libertação da Guiné Portuguesa, MLGP)

Its life was short due to internal conflict and it was soon replaced by the United Liberation Front (Front Uni de Libération, FUL), a predecessor of the Struggle Front for the National Independence of Guinea (Frente de Luta Pela Independencia Nacional da Guine-Bissau, FLING)
