= Liberation Front of Guinea =

Political party in Guinea-Bissau

The Liberation Front of Guinea (Portuguese: Frente de Libertação da Guiné, FLG) was a political party in Guinea-Bissau, the part of Portuguese Guinea, formed to seek independence from Portugal.

It was created in 1961 from the union of the Liberation Movement of Guinea (Movimento de Libertação da Guiné, MLG) headed by Francois Kankoila Mendy and the African Democratic Rally of Guinea (Rassemblement Democratique Africain de la Guinee, RDAG). On 3 August 1962 FLG merged in turn with six other parties to form the Struggle Front for the National Independence of Guinea (Frente de Luta pela Independência Nacional da Guiné, FLING)
