= Anders Henrik Bull =

Norwegian electrical engineer

- Born: 25 January 1875; Minneapolis, Minnesota, U.S.
- Died: 29 July 1956 (aged 81)
- Father: Ole Bornemann Bull
- Relatives: Fredrik Rosing Bull (brother); Jens Bull (half-brother); Johan Bull (half-brother)

Anders Henrik Bull (25 January 1875 – 29 July 1956) was an American-born Norwegian electrical engineer.

== Early life and education ==
Bull was born in Minneapolis as the son of ophthalmologist Ole Bornemann Bull (1842–1916) and his first wife Marie Cathrine Lund (1843–1884). The family moved to Norway in 1876. He took his engineering education in Kristiania and Hanover.

== Career ==
Bull returned to Norway from Hannover in 1901, and became noted in the engineering community for his pioneering work on wireless telegraphy. He also worked for Norsk Hydro, as a consultant to Kristian Birkeland, from 1906 to 1909, in that company's formative phase. He married Agnes Emilie Rosenkvist, née Lund, in November 1908. They later remigrated to the United States.

He was awarded the Louis E. Levy Medal in 1943.

== Personal life ==
Anders Henrik Bull was the brother of Fredrik Rosing Bull, and a half-brother of Jens Bull and Johan Bull.
