= Eustace Tilley =

Mascot of The New Yorker

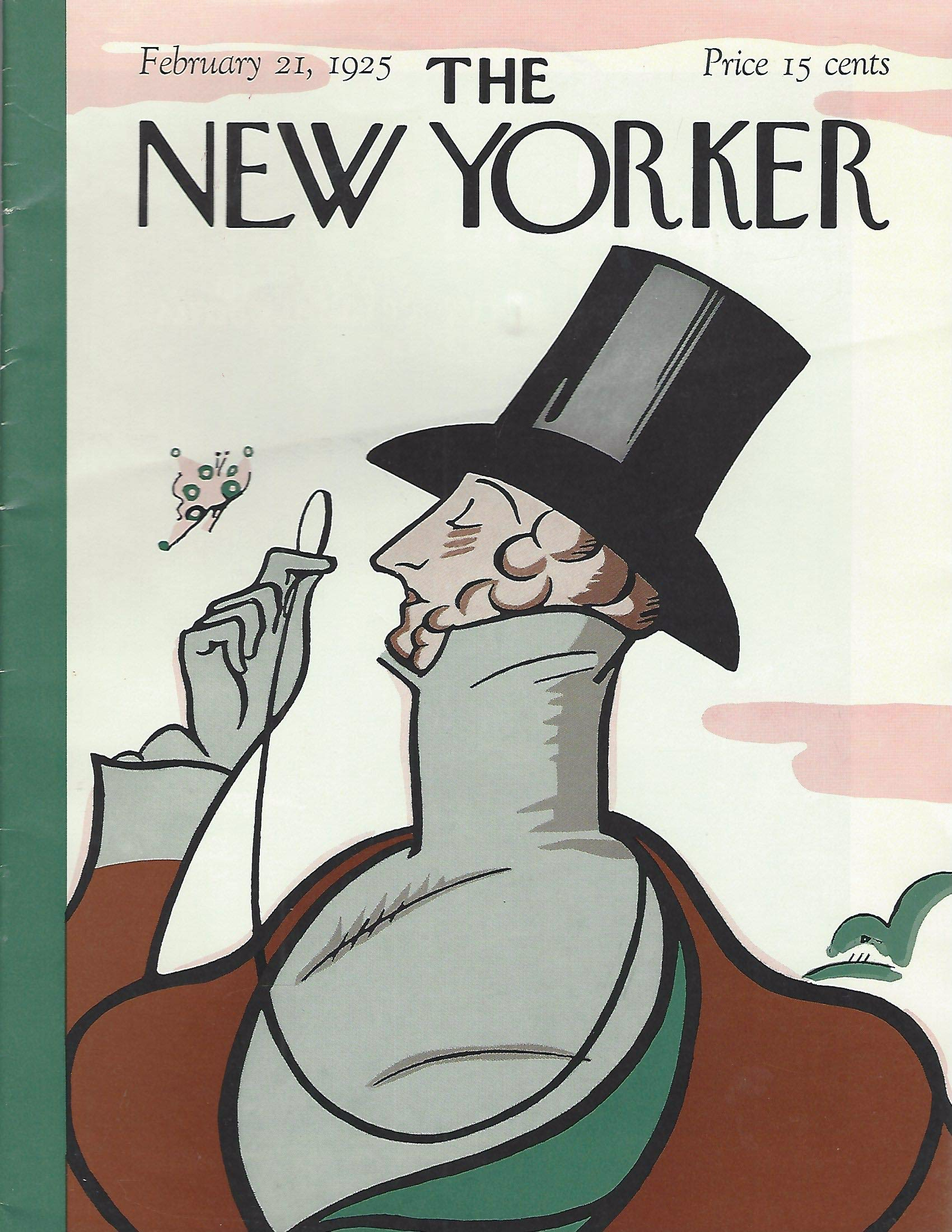
Tilley featured on the cover of the first issue of The New Yorker (dated February 21, 1925) as a dandy of days past, as created by Rea Irvin

Eustace Tilley is a caricature that appeared on the cover of the first issue of The New Yorker in 1925 and has appeared on the cover in various forms of every anniversary issue of the magazine except 2017. He was not initially named, but acquired the name from Corey Ford in subsequent issues as part of a fictional magazine history backstory included to fill the early issues of the magazine. The original cover, showing Tilley examining a butterfly through his monocle, was drawn by Rea Irvin, but a younger and more modern-looking version of him as drawn by Johan Bull in subsequent months appeared throughout the magazine in its early years. This later version was given the name Tilley and subsequently the original cover was also declared to be Tilley. Because of the cover's prominence, almost all of the references to Tilley in the press discuss the Irvin version.

Irvin drew three versions of the masthead artwork that featured Tilley in 1925 and 1926. Irvin's third version from 1926 was not updated or revamped until the May 22, 2017, issue with artwork by Christoph Niemann. In 2023, Niemann drew a robot named Till-E for the magazine.

Until 1994, the original cover artwork was reproduced for the annual anniversary edition, but, since then, there has been significant variation in how his character has been embodied. He has become the mascot of the magazine and is described as a dandy. There have been two years without any anniversary issue and in other years, when the anniversary celebration/remembrance has broken from previously-established tradition, it has resulted in stories in publications such as The Washington Post and The New York Times. Since 2008, artists have competed in an annual Eustace Tilley contest with prizes that include the potential to have their artistic interpretation submissions chosen for the anniversary cover. All contest submissions are derived from Irvin's version.

== Origin ==
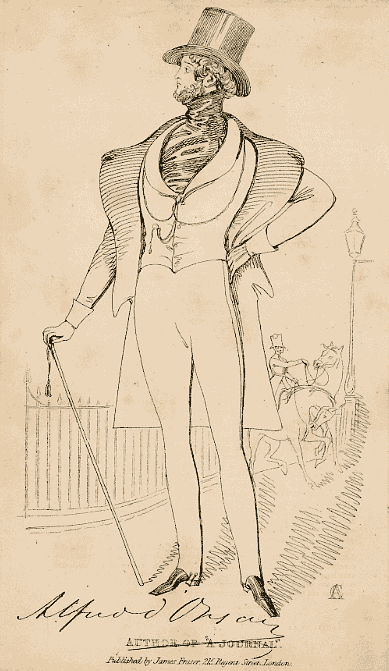
Image of Alfred d'Orsay (1801–1852), published by James Fraser (1783–1856)

Tilley was born out of necessity when the coverless first edition of The New Yorker was set to print. After editor-in-chief and founder Harold Ross was unsatisfied by the array of artist submissions under the theme of "a curtain going up on Manhattan", Ross turned to art editor Rea Irvin with the directive to produce a cover that "would make the subscribers feel that we've been in business for years and know our way around". Irvin was The New Yorker's first employee and its de facto art editor. He drew the magazine's first cover of the character, modelling him on a caricature of Alfred d'Orsay in the December 1834 edition of Fraser's Magazine. This caricature can be found under the subject "costume" in the 11th edition of the Encyclopædia Britannica published in 1910 ("Costume", Encyclopædia Britannica, eleventh edition, vol. 7 (New York: Encyclopædia Britannica Co., 1910), 244, fig. 47.). Irvin, who had four months earlier drawn a magazine cover of a well-clad gentleman, added features to the 19th-century stylistic source image: a monocle to represent “supercilious intellect” as well as a butterfly for "whimsey".

First 3 Inside section logos
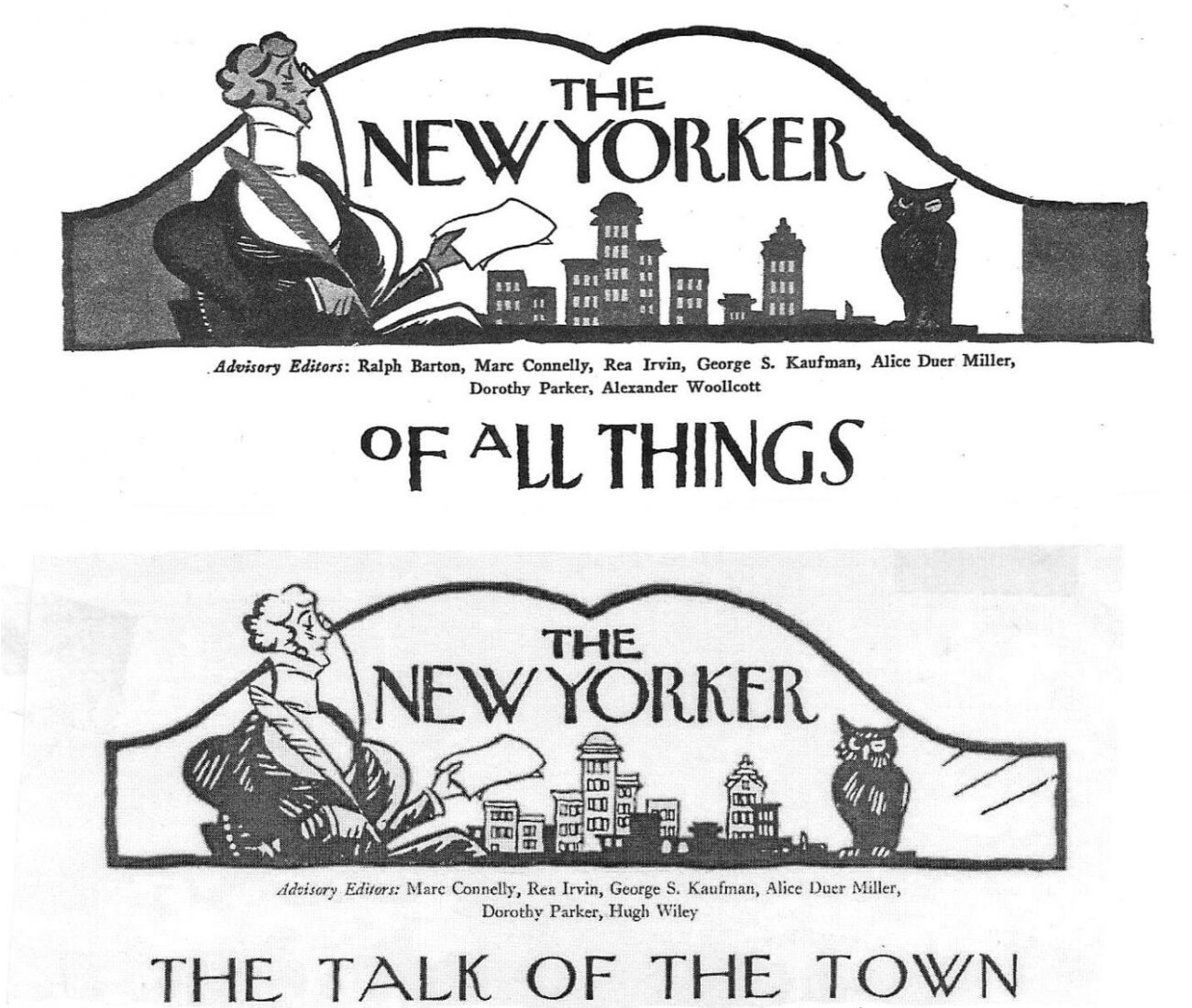
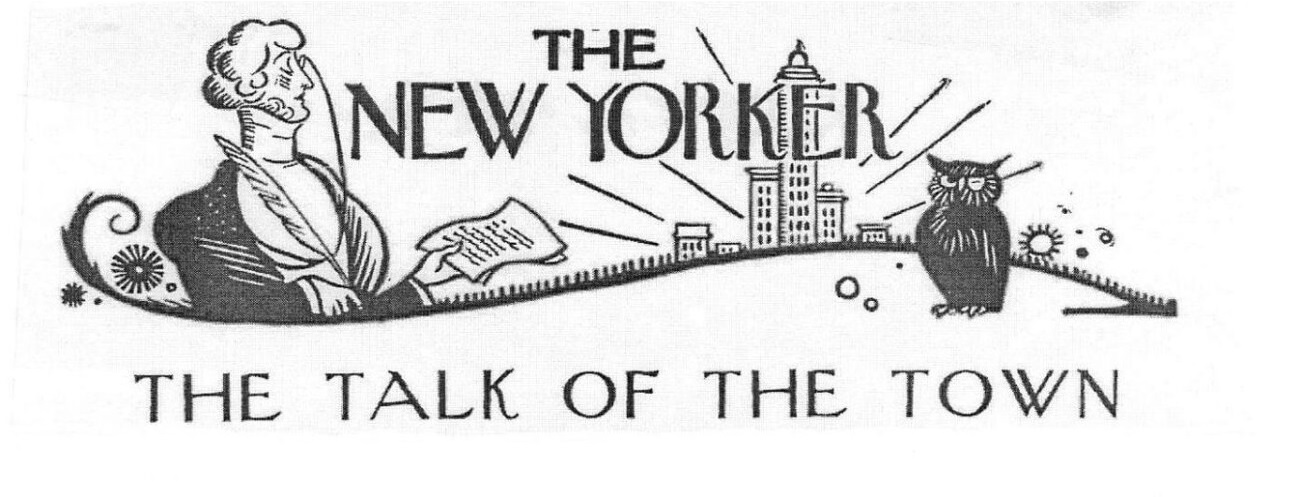
Irvin's inside section masthead logos from February 1925, August 1925 and March 1926 with Tilley

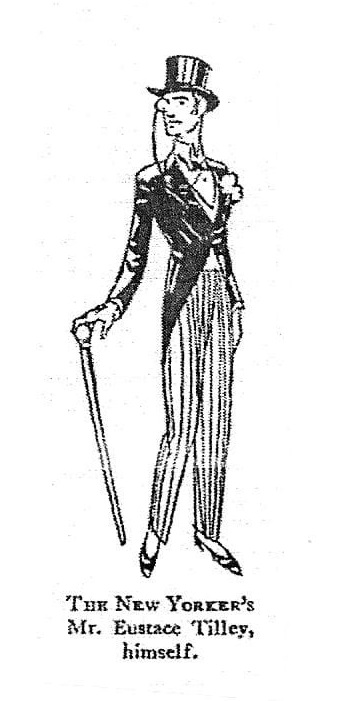
Johan Bull drew Tilley for Corey Ford's "The Making of a Magazine" parody starting in August 1925. Closeups like this first appeared in Chapter XVII.

Since advertisers were not filling the pages of the unfamiliar magazine at first, it commissioned Corey Ford to fill the pages with a series of humor pieces that "pretended to provide an inside look at the making of the magazine" with illustrations of the mascot, in which he was dubbed with the name Eustace Tilley. His appearances in the series is likened thematically to Where's Wally?/Where's Waldo? Tilley was presented as the hero of Ford's series which was titled "The Making of a Magazine". He was introduced inside front cover of the August 8, 1925, issue with a more youthful appearance than that of the original cover art subject. Ford combined the last name of a somewhat humorous aunt of his with the name Eustace due to euphony. His top hat was of a newer style, without the curved brim. He wore a morning coat and striped formal trousers. The series ran for 21 chapters of pseudo-intellectual parody and first presented Tilley in close-up in Chapter XVII. The range of activities and duties held by Tilley within the magazine in the decades after "The Making of a Magazine" gave a reputation as a man of action on top of his erudite man of taste presentation. For "The Making of a Magazine" chapters, Tilley was drawn with modern attire of the day by Johan Bull (whose tenure with the magazine seems to have ended in 1927), although each feature's layout was ornamented with Irvin's 19th-century-cladded version at the top. At some point well after Tilley was named on the inside we are told that he is the same named person in the original cover art that would be reused annually. In Chapter XX, we are told that Eustace was born to Mrs. Terwilliger Tilley on January 1, 1876.

Ross believed Tilley was the highlight of the inaugural issue and each year that the magazine managed to survive, he acknowledged this by putting him on the cover again. By appearing on the cover exactly as originally drawn every year for decades on the issue closest to the anniversary date of February 21, Tilley has become a kind of mascot for The New Yorker. He has frequently made appearance within the magazine and on promotional materials, with occasional artistic license used to provide variation on his appearance. More recent anniversary editions have "parodied, subverted or deconstructed" the original artwork.

== Persona ==
The New York Times described him as follows: "The enduring symbol of The New Yorker magazine—the aristocratic, top-hatted Regency dandy, Eustace Tilley, studying a fluttering pale pink butterfly through a monocle". The Comics Journal says his depiction is incongruous: "a seeming sophisticated man-about-town who is so vapidly empty-headed as to find a fluttering insect an object worthy of minute inspection." Crosstown rival magazine New York describes him as a dandy who has always been somewhat condescending. ABC News describes him as "foppish". The Nieman Foundation for Journalism at Harvard University in their Nieman Reports stated that Tilley portrays the "essence" of the magazine—"a slightly condescending but consummately tasteful arbiter of the larger world".

== Rebirth ==
According to long-time The New Yorker art editor Françoise Mouly, when Tina Brown arrived at The New Yorker as editor-in-chief, she wanted to break tradition with a February 15, 1993 cover by Charles Burns, but resistance relegated the work to a February 22, 1993 appearance inside the magazine. The 1994 version broke with tradition by substituting for the dandy a drawing by R. Crumb of a contemporary city youth wearing a logo t-shirt and a backwards baseball cap and looking at – instead of a butterfly – a flyer for a pornographic theater. The New York Times described this version as bearing mere resemblance to the original staid and wing-collared Tilley, rather than being a copy, but with similarities that included the "long neck, the pointy nose, the all-but-concealed eye, even the penciled arch of eyebrow". Twice in the late 1990s there was no anniversary edition.

January 7, 2013, was the deadline for the sixth annual Eustace Tilley contest in which readers submit their own interpretations of the magazine's mascot. This suggests the original annual contest was for the 2008 issue. User submissions for the original contest can be found online at Flickr. Nine winning entries from nearly three hundred entries were announced in a published release dated February 4, 2008. The original contest earned coverage by outlets such as Gothamist. The 2008 cover was produced in homage to the ongoing 2008 Democratic Party presidential primaries as a two-headed face card dubbed Eustace Tillarobama, with depictions of Barack Obama and Hillary Clinton. By the time of the sixth annual edition, editors selected 12 winners and readers subsequently voted to determine 5 readers' choice winners. When interviewed by New York, 2013 contest winner Simon Greiner described his hipster work on updating of Tilley's physical cues based on the original as follows: "the sideburns into the beard, the monocle into the eyeglasses, the coat, and the hat".

In protest of Executive Order 13769 by Donald Trump, the newly seated President of the United States, Tilley was not depicted on the 2017 anniversary issue, instead appearing two issues later. That year's anniversary cover was art from John W. Tomac that was based on the hand and torch of the Statue of Liberty in an effort to stand behind American values that welcomed immigrants in contrast to the values Trump expressed via executive order. The March 7, 2017, cover featured a human observer resembling Vladimir Putin and the usual lepidopteran subject of observation with a Trump–based head to highlight the New Cold War. The work by artist Barry Blitt is titled "Eustace Vladimirovich Tilley".

By the time of the 2021 edition of the Eustace Tilley contest, there had been years in which none of the winners actually appeared on the cover and other years in which multiple covers with depictions of the character by multiple artists were published. The range of variations have been significant. The mascot had twice been manifested by contest winners as a female Eustacia (once on an anniversary edition cover and once in the summer). Tilley has also been depicted by contest winners as a youthful punk and a youthful hipster as well as a wide variety of character contexts. The 2023 winner and anniversary cover veteran, Tomac, presented Eustace in canine form.

== Christoph Niemann era ==
Tilley in the masthead
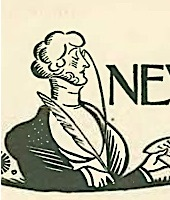
Left: Rea Irvin version used March 1926 to May 2017; Right: Christoph Niemann version used May 2017 to present

In 2015, The New Yorker published nine different covers for its 90th anniversary edition, and a digital art version by Christoph Niemann was one of the female versions among the selectees. Starting with the May 22, 2017, issue, Tilley was redrawn for the masthead by Niemann. The new depiction included the elimination of Tilley's character lines in his hair, face, and jacket; elimination of dots in his jacket; narrowing of his body; and smoothing of his face. In addition, the owl has been slimmed, and had some lines eliminated. The skyline of buildings was also revamped to include the new World Trade Center and an erect building that resembles the Leaning Tower of Pisa; eliminate spacing between buildings; replace other unique buildings with generic ones.

Many other elements of the masthead have been smoothed out or slimmed to eliminate the human touch or give different effects. Niemann drew the November 20, 2023-dated issue cover of a robot as a representation of an artificial intelligence helper and named the robot Till-E as part of an AI-themed cover story published November 13.
