= Jens Bull =

Norwegian diplomat (1886–1956)

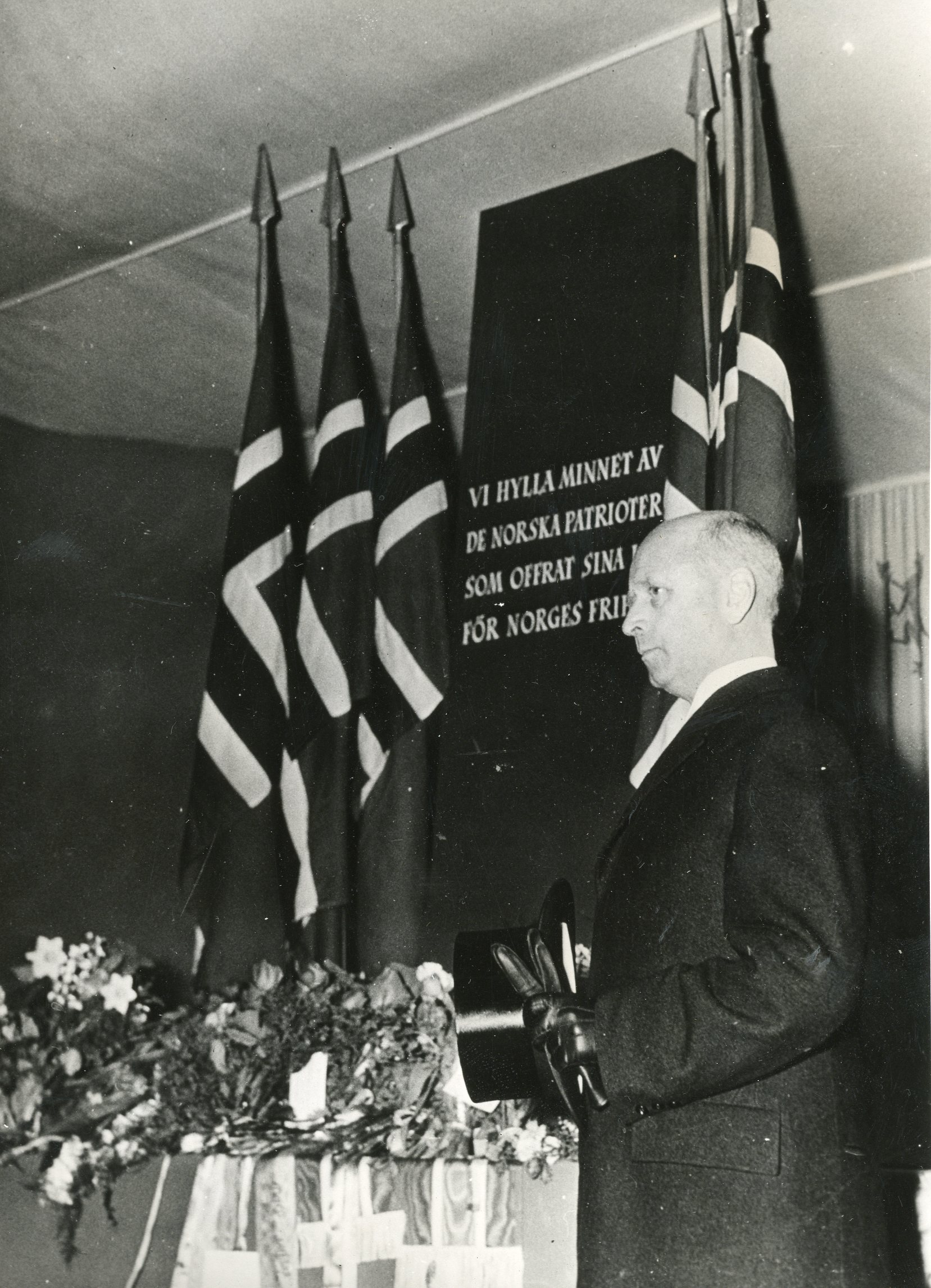
- Jens Bull speaking on behalf of Norway at the Norwegian exhibition in Stockholm, April 9th 1943.
- Born: 25 November 1886; Christiania
- Died: 1 June 1956 (aged 69)
- Occupations: Jurist and diplomat
- Father: Ole Bornemann Bull
- Awards: Order of St. Olav (1948); Order of the Polar Star; Order of Orange-Nassau

Jens Steenberg Bull (25 November 1886 – 1 June 1956) was a Norwegian jurist and diplomat. He played his most important role during World War II, when he represented his country in Stockholm, Sweden.

== Personal life ==
He was born in Christiania as the son of Ole Bornemann Bull (1842–1916) and Kaja Constance Steenberg (1855–1939). He was the eleventh of fifteen children in his family, and his younger brother Johan Bull was a notable illustrator. His older half-brother was Fredrik Rosing Bull. From November 1917, Jens Bull was married to Aslaug Malling.

== Career ==
He finished his secondary school in 1905, and graduated from the University of Kristiania with the cand.jur. degree in 1909. He was hired in the Norwegian Ministry of Foreign Affairs in 1911, worked with international law and was a delegate to the League of Nations from 1921 to 1924. He was a counsellor at the Norwegian legations in Berlin from 1925 to 1931, in The Hague from 1931 to 1933, and in Stockholm from 1934 to 1938. He was appointed deputy under-secretary of state in the Ministry of Foreign Affairs in 1938, and was promoted to permanent under-secretary of state in 1939. In 1938 he also published a genealogical work on his own lineage.

Following 9 April 1940, when Norway was invaded and subsequently occupied by Nazi Germany, Bull took part in various negotiations, being dispatched to non-occupied Stockholm in Sweden. He was ambassador in Stockholm from 1940 to 1945, taking over as chargé d'affaires after the death of Johan Wollebæk in October 1940. He was recognized as minister by the Swedish authorities from 1942. He played an important role at the Norwegian legation in Stockholm during World War II, when there was a colony of more than 50,000 Norwegian refugees in Sweden.

He was made ambassador in The Hague in March 1945, and continued after the war's end, to 1951. During this period he also helped establish the Council of Europe. He was then the Norwegian ambassador in Copenhagen from 1951 until his death in 1956.

Bull was decorated as a Commander with Star of the Royal Norwegian Order of St. Olav in 1948. He received the Grand Cross of the Swedish Order of the Polar Star and the Dutch Order of Orange-Nassau.
