= Jill S. Grigsby =

American sociologist

Jill Spencer Grigsby (born March 8, 1954) is an American sociologist whose areas of expertise include demography and sociology of the family. She is an emerita professor of sociology at Pomona College in Claremont, California.

== Early life ==
Grigsby was born in West Palm Beach, Florida, and grew up in Riviera Beach and Palm Beach Gardens nearby. She moved to the Boston area with her family in 11th grade and graduated from Dover-Sherborn High School. She completed her undergraduate studies Brown University, where she majored in applied mathematics. She then earned a doctorate from Princeton University in sociology and demography. Her dissertation was titled "The Use of Contraception for Delaying and Spacing Births in Colombia, Costa Rica, and Korea".

== Career ==
Grigsby joined the Pomona College faculty in 1983. She was a postdoctoral fellow at the National Institute on Aging for several years in the 1980s and 1990s. During the spring 2010 semester, she taught at Doshisha University in Kyoto, Japan for the Associated Kyoto Program, and conducted research on the role of pets in Japanese family life. For a portion of the fall 2014 semester, she was the interim Vice President for Academic Affairs and Dean of the College. She retired in June 2021 as the Richard Steele Professor of Social Sciences and Professor of Sociology and was given emerita status.

== Works ==
- Grigsby, Jill (2016). "Global Education with High Impact and Deep Learning in the United States: The Liberal Arts at Pomona College". In Jung, I.; Nishimura, M.; Sasao, T. (eds.). Liberal Arts Education and Colleges in East Asia. Higher Education in Asia: Quality, Excellence and Governance. Singapore: Springer. pp. 99–111. doi:10.1007/978-981-10-0513-8_9. ISBN 978-981-10-0511-4.
- Heer, David M.; —— (1992). Society and Population (3rd ed.). Englewood Cliffs, N.J.: Prentice Hall. ISBN 0-13-819707-5. OCLC 24106408.
- ——; Bernstein, Danielle (October 2007). Claremont Senior Program 2007 Client Survey: Summary of Findings (Report). City of Claremont.

== Personal life ==
Grigsby is married to Rett Bull, a computer science professor at Pomona. She has a daughter, Janet Light, a mental health counselor. She enjoys traveling and volunteers with the City of Claremont's Committee on Aging and the House of Ruth in Pomona, California.
