= Bull baronets =

Baronetcy in the Baronetage of the United Kingdom

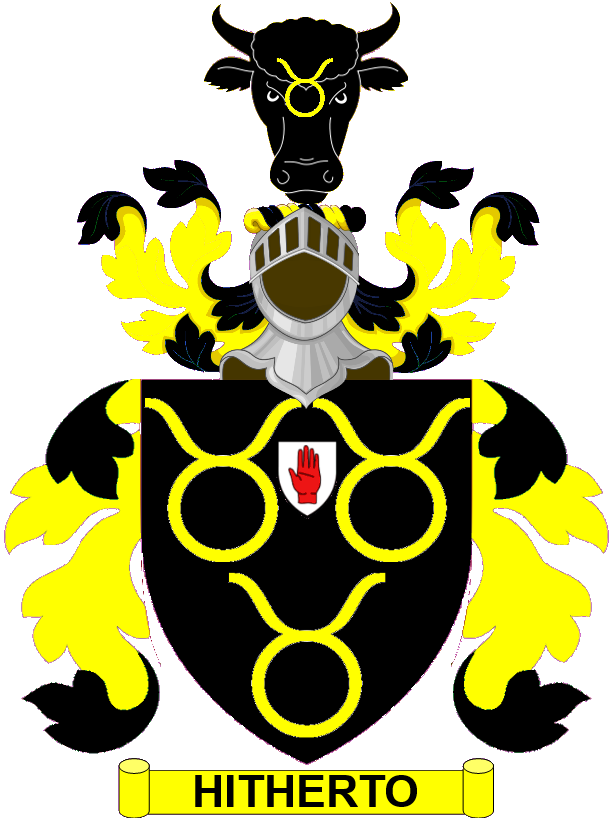
- Crest: A bull’s head caboshed Sable charged on the forehead with the sign of Taurus as in the arms.
- Shield: Sable three astronomical signs of Taurus Or.
- Motto: Hitherto

The Bull Baronetcy, of Hammersmith in the County of London, is a title in the Baronetage of the United Kingdom. It was created on 25 November 1922 for the Conservative politician Sir William Bull. He represented Hammersmith and Hammersmith South in the House of Commons for many years. His eldest son, the second Baronet, died on active service in the Second World War and was succeeded by his younger brother, the third Baronet. As of 2019 the title is held by the latter's grandson, the fifth Baronet, who succeeded in 2019.

Anthony Bull and Peter Bull were sons of the first baronet.

== Bull baronets, of Hammersmith (1922) ==
- Sir William Bull, 1st Baronet (29 September 1863 – 23 January 1931)
- Sir Stephen Bull, 2nd Baronet (11 October 1904 – 9 March 1942)
- Sir George Bull, 3rd Baronet (19 June 1906 – 9 September 1986)
- Sir Simeon George Bull, 4th Baronet (1 August 1934 – 7 April 2019)
- Sir Stephen Louis Bull, 5th Baronet (born 5 April 1966)

The heir apparent is the present holder's son Dominic Bull (born 2005).
