= De Bortoli Wines =

Australian wine company

De Bortoli Wines Pty Limited
- Company type: Private
- Industry: Wine
- Founded: 1928
- Headquarters: Bilbul, New South Wales, Australia
- Key people: Emeri De Bortoli, Darren De Bortoli, Leanne Webber (nee De Bortoli), Victor De Bortoli, Kevin De Bortoli
- Website: http://www.debortoli.com.au

De Bortoli Wines is a wine-producing private family-owned company based in Australia. In 2022 it was ranked the seventh largest Australian wine company by production, and the sixth largest in terms of total revenue. Its range of wines includes the sweet botrytized (Noble rot-affected) white dessert wine, Noble One.

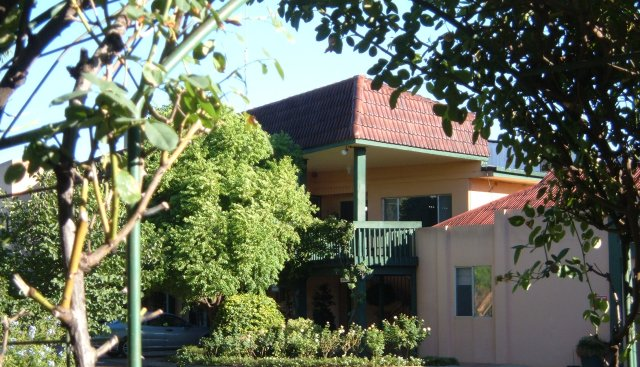
De Bortoli Wines Bilbul Winery

== Wineries and vineyards ==
De Bortoli Wines currently owns four wineries in four different Australian wine growing regions, this follows the acquisition of the vineyards, winery and tourism facility of Rutherglen Estates in 2018.

- Bilbul near Griffith in the Riverina region of New South Wales
- Near Cessnock in the Hunter Valley of New South Wales (formerly the Wilderness Estate winery, acquired in 2002)
- Dixons Creek near Yarra Glen in the Yarra Valley in Victoria
- Rutherglen in the Rutherglen wine region in Victoria

The company has vineyards in the same regions as its wineries, along with the King Valley in Victoria.

== Winemaking ==
The winemaking team is overseen by third-generation winemaker Darren De Bortoli and his brother-in-law Steve Webber. In the early 1980s, Darren De Bortoli created the Noble One Botrytis Semillon. Leanne De Bortoli and her husband, Steve Webber, established the company's Yarra Valley winery and restaurant complex in the late 1980s, with Steve Webber also responsible for overseeing the Yarra Valley winery and vineyards.

== Noble One ==
De Bortoli Wines Noble One Botrytis Semillon is a sweet white dessert wine, developed by Darren De Bortoli during the early 1980s.

Since its release, Noble One has been awarded 104 Trophies, 352 Gold medals and 113 International Awards. In 2005 screw cap closures were placed on 50% of the 750ml bottles of 2003 Noble One in a trial that attempted to ensure fruit intensity and freshness for consumers. De Bortoli Wines have kept the 375ml, 50% of the 750ml and all export stock under cork. However, in an industry where issues over cork taint keep arising, approximately 34% of wines are sealed with some type of synthetic closure.

Noble One was given its name in 1990 as a result of the bilateral agreement between Australia and the European Economic Community in which Australia agreed to phase out the use of European names on wine labels. Previously the wine was known as 'Sauternes,' but today it is simply called Noble One.

== Black Noble ==
Black Noble is a fortified botrytised Semillon produced by De Bortoli Wines. Originally conceived by Vittorio De Bortoli in the 1930s, it was not released commercially until 1982. The wine is crafted from parcels of Noble One fruit affected by noble rot, fortified early in fermentation and aged in a solera system of used barrels, resulting in a blend averaging approximately ten years of age, with a base dating back to 1972. The wine’s production and sensory characteristics—such as coffee-chocolate, raisin, and fig aromas, along with mocha, cacao, and hazelnut notes—have been described by reviewers.

Black Noble has also been recognised in industry competitions. In the 2023 Fortified Masters, it earned a gold medal in the Semillon category.

== Rosé Rosé ==
Rosé Rosé was introduced by De Bortoli in 2018 as a pale, dry rosé expression, contributing to the contemporary Australian rosé movement. The 2022 vintage won the ‘Master’ accolade in the Global Rosé Masters 2023—the only Australian rosé to do so. The wine was also listed among the top ten rosés of 2023 by The Drinks Business.

== De Bortoli Estate Vineyard Pinot Noir ==
De Bortoli Estate Vineyard Pinot Noir is a cool-climate Pinot Noir produced by De Bortoli Wines from estate vineyards in the Yarra Valley, Victoria, Australia.

The 2023 vintage received a Double Gold medal at the 2024 San Francisco International Wine Competition.

In the International Wine Challenge 2024, the wine was rated 92 points, described as "cranberry and red berry flavours with smoked complexity, rounded tannins, juicy and moreish".

It was also included in wine critic Ray Jordan’s Top 100 Reds 2024, where it received 94 points.

== De Bortoli Estate Vineyard Chardonnay ==
De Bortoli Estate Vineyard Chardonnay is a cool-climate white wine produced in the Yarra Valley, Victoria, Australia. The Estate Vineyard, located in Dixons Creek, includes plantings of Chardonnay vines dating back to 1971.

The 2023 vintage received a Bronze Medal at the 2025 International Wine & Spirit Competition (IWSC). Judges described the wine as having "bright lemon and apple aromas mingling with delicate floral notes," with a palate showing "juicy stone fruit and a hint of creamy butterscotch," finishing "crisp and refreshing".

It also received a four-star rating from The Real Review, which ranked it among the top Australian Chardonnays of 2023. The publication noted its "crystal clean palate with steely overtones" and a finish that "lengthens with just-ripened pineapple".

== De Bortoli One Line ==
The De Bortoli One Line range was introduced in late 2024 as part of the winery’s Rutherglen portfolio. The range diverges from the region’s traditional focus on fortified and robust red wines by featuring lighter European-style varietals such as Pinot Grigio and Fiano.

The 2024 One Line Pinot Grigio was awarded the Best Pinot Gris/Grigio of Show trophy at the 2025 National Wine Show of Australia. The 2024 Tempranillo won a Gold Medal at the 2025 Cairns Wine Show and Silver Medals at both the Decanter World Wine Awards and the International Wine & Spirit Competition. The 2024 Sangiovese also received a Silver Medal.

== De Bortoli Melba Vineyard Cabernet Sauvignon ==
De Bortoli Melba Vineyard Cabernet Sauvignon is a premium red wine produced from estate-grown Cabernet Sauvignon in Dixons Creek, Yarra Valley, Victoria. The name "Melba" pays tribute to famed Australian soprano Dame Nellie Melba.

The wine is only produced in exceptional vintages, with production years including 2012, 2015, and 2017. Vines were first planted in 1971, with subsequent additions in 1987, 1988, and 1990.

The 2018 vintage was described as "bright, deep red with purple edges," offering aromas of dense mineral-scented blackcurrant, cedar wood, and tobacco. It was noted for its intensity, persistence, silky texture, and beautifully balanced tannins, with flavors of ripe blackberry, smoke, cedarwood, cocoa, red currants, cassis, and subtle spices forming a gentle finish.

In the Halliday Wine Companion 2023 review of the 2019 edition, reviewer Philip Rich awarded 96 points, describing it as a medium-deep cherry red with aromas of cassis, black plum, olive tapenade, and cigar box. He praised its rich, structured fruit and fine tannins, noting its potential for long-term cellaring.

=== History ===
During Darren De Bortoli's years at Roseworthy Agricultural College, Australia's premier winemaking institute, a lot of development work was being done on Botrytis wine styles. While there, De Bortoli decided to make botrytis-affected wine of his own. At that time (1982) there was a surplus of Semillon grapes, a thin-skinned, tight-bunched varietal particularly susceptible to extensive, uniform botrytis infection. The resulting wine went on to win numerous awards including Best Botrytis Wine at the International Wine and Spirit Competition in 1984.

== History ==
De Bortoli Wines was established in 1928 by Vittorio & Giuseppina De Bortoli and rapidly expanded under the direction of their son, Deen De Bortoli. The family history is documented in a book called Celebrazione! launched in 2003 to celebrate De Bortoli Wines' 75th Anniversary.

Deen De Bortoli (born 1936) was the chairman of De Bortoli Wines. He was born in 1936, and at age 15 he left school to help his parents Vittorio and Giuseppina run the family business. He married Emeri De Bortoli in 1958, and lived in Bilbul, New South Wales, his whole life. Deen and Emeri had four children, all of which work for the company today. Deen featured in the 2002 episode of the ABC's Dynasties television series titled The De Bortolis of Griffith which tracked the growth over three generations of the family business from Italian immigrants into one of Australia's largest family wine companies. Deen died in 2003 at the age of 67.

Darren De Bortoli (born 1960) is currently the managing director of De Bortoli Wines Pty Limited. Darren studied winemaking at Roseworthy College in South Australia, where he graduated with a Bachelor of Applied Science in Oenology in 1982. Darren is well known for his Botrytis Semillon, Noble One. At the age of 33, Darren was appointed Managing Director. Along with his father, he was also featured in the 2002 episode of the ABC's Dynasties television series titled The De Bortolis of Griffith

Darren's sister Leanne manages the Yarra and King Valley wineries with her husband Stephen Webber. Webber is also the Chief Winemaker, for the Yarra Valley Winery of the De Bortoli family business, established in 1928. He was awarded 'Winemaker of the Year by Gourmet Traveller WINE' in 2007.

In 2018 a social media scandal surrounding Darren De Bortoli's personal postings became international news. The postings were described as "sexist" and "inappropriate."

== Achievements ==
- The Graham Gregory Award for Services to the NSW Wine Industry, in 1995.
- The Inaugural Golden Plate Award for his contribution to the wine industry in the Riverina.
- The Jimmy Watson Award for 1996 Yarra Valley Golf Station Reserve Shiraz, in 1997.
- Past President of the MIA Winemakers Association.
- Australian Wine Research Institute board member
- Chairman of Judges Melbourne Wine Show
- 2007 Winemaker of the Year by GourmetTraveller WINE

== Environment and technology ==
As a family-owned company, De Bortoli Wines has often taken a longer-term view of the world than a traditional corporate equivalent.

Examples include the consideration of concepts such as data sovereignty and commitment to open standards and the rollout of Linux desktop clients.

Examples of De Bortoli Wines' long-term view of environmental sustainability include:

- Participating in the Greenhouse Challenge and Packaging Covenant and the Australian Wine Industry Environmental Stewardship program.
- Adopting an integrated Pest Management System in the vineyard minimising the use of chemical sprays.
- Purchasing easy to clean winery equipment to minimise water usage, for example, dry cake discharge filters and centrifuges.
- Adopting recycling practices at all sites e.g. composting of winery skins and stalks, restaurant compostables, separation of bottles, cardboard, cork, and plastic.
- Replacing sodium with potassium in the cleaning process for winery tanks and machinery due to concerns relating to salinity in the environment. This change also enabled the reuse of winery wastewater (now containing potash) as a fertiliser for crops.
- Having the first project from NSW Office of Environment and Heritage's Sustainability Advantage program recognised as Platinum, and in 2022 becoming the first organisation to be awarded the title of Platinum Partner under the NSW Government’s Sustainability Advantage Program

== See also ==
- Australian wine
