= Bilbul, New South Wales =

Bilbul
- Town
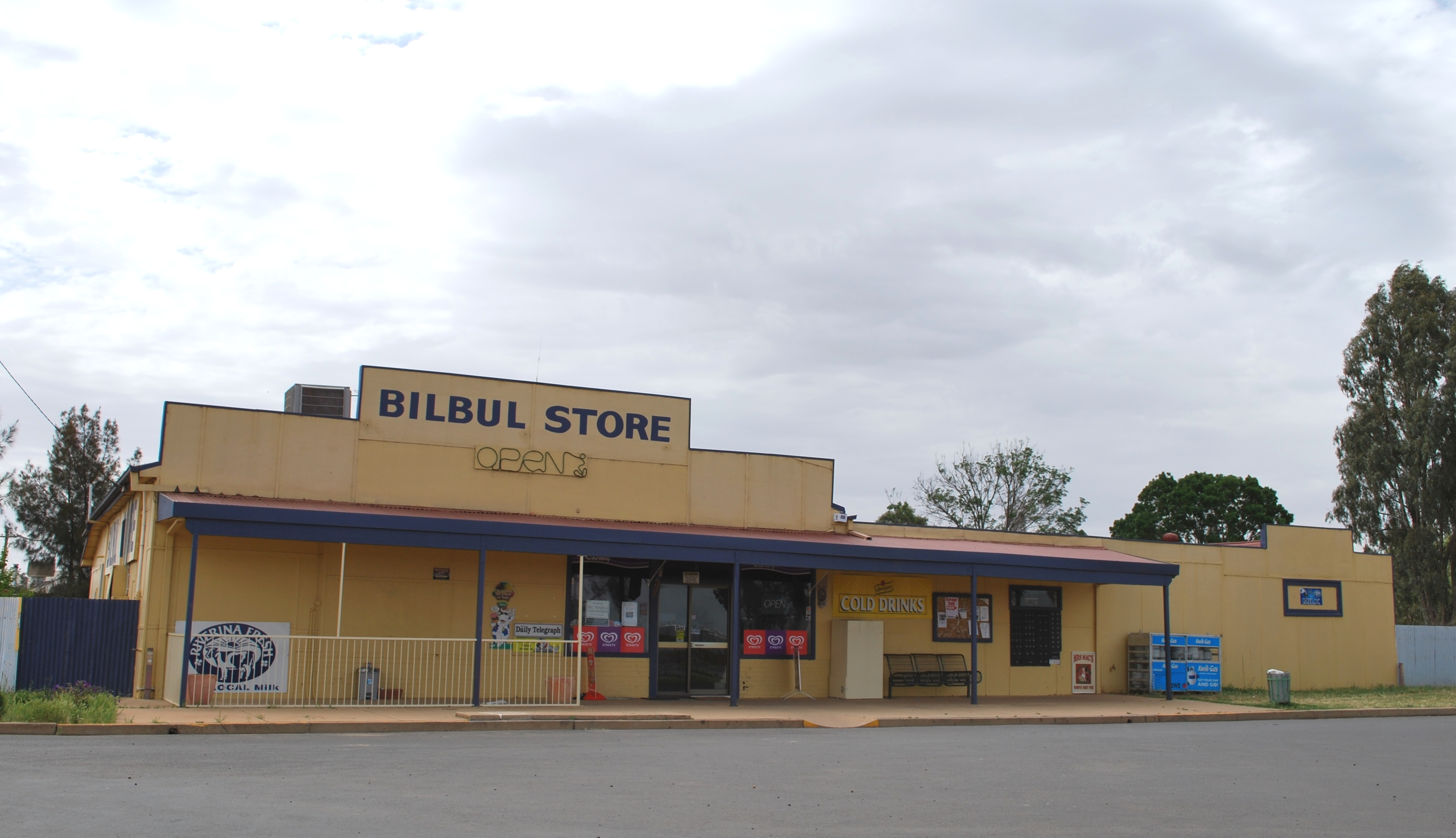
- The Bilbul General Store

- Coordinates: 34°16′30″S 146°9′0″E
- Country: Australia
- State: New South Wales
- LGA: City of Griffith
- Location: 563 km (350 mi) from Sydney; 10 km (6.2 mi) from Griffith; 6 km (3.7 mi) from Yoogali; 6 km (3.7 mi) from Yenda

Government
  - State electorate: Murray
  - Federal division: Farrer

Population
  - Total: 586 (2021 census)
- Postcode: 2680
- County: Cooper

Bilbul is a village in the Australian state of New South Wales. It lies in the central part of the Riverina and situated about 6 kilometres north-east of Griffith and 6 kilometres south-west of Yenda. Bilbul was named in honor of William T Bull, an early landowner from the 1880s. The William Bull Brewery is located at Bilbul and named after William Bull, and thus indirectly also after Bilbul. The town had a population at the 2021 census census of 586 people.

The head office of De Bortoli Wines, the makers of wine brands such as Noble One, a Botrytis Semillon, is at Bilbul.

Bilbul Post Office opened on 6 November 1922.

Bilbul Public School closed in October 2011 after enrolments fell to an all-time low. After over 80 years of operation, the Bilbul Store closed its doors on 31 March 2017.
