= Ole Bornemann Bull (physician) =

Norwegian physician and ophthalmologist

Ole Bornemann Bull (31 August 1842 – 10 April 1916) was a Norwegian physician and ophthalmologist.

He was born in Arendal in Aust-Agder, Norway. He was the son of parish priest August Theodor Bull (1809–1882) and Theodora Regina Madsen (1816–1852).

He was a student at the Royal Frederick University (now University of Oslo). He enrolled as a student in 1859 and graduated with the cand.med. degree in 1869. He spent the years 1872 to 1876 in the Minneapolis. He was hired at Rikshospitalet at Oslo in 1878 and started a medical research career. He took the dr.med. degree in 1881, and was a research fellow of ophthalmology from 1882 to 1885. He issued several publications after this, and received the Crown Prince Gold Medal in 1893 for one of his works.

Bull married twice; with Marie Cathrine Lund (1843–1884) and Kaja Constance Steenberg (1855–1939). He was the father of Anders Henrik Bull, Fredrik Rosing Bull, Jens Bull and Johan Grønlund Bull.
