= David Bull (art restorer) =

American art conservator (1934–2024)

David Bull (March 5, 1934 – December 28, 2024) was an English conservator of old master paintings, and an author. He worked with the J. Paul Getty Museum in Malibu, California, and the National Gallery of Art in Washington D.C. Bull stepped in as director of the Norton Simon Museum, Pasadena, California 1980–1981, and served as visiting director at the Timken Museum of Art in San Diego in 2014–2015.

David Bull was born in Bristol, England, the son of a banker, and studied art and design at the West of England College of Art. Bull worked for the National Gallery, London, and in 1981 founded his own conservation firm, Fine Art Conservation & Restoration Inc. with his wife, the conservator Teresa Longyear. In 1984 he moved to Washington to lead the department of painting conservation at the National Gallery of Art through 1999.

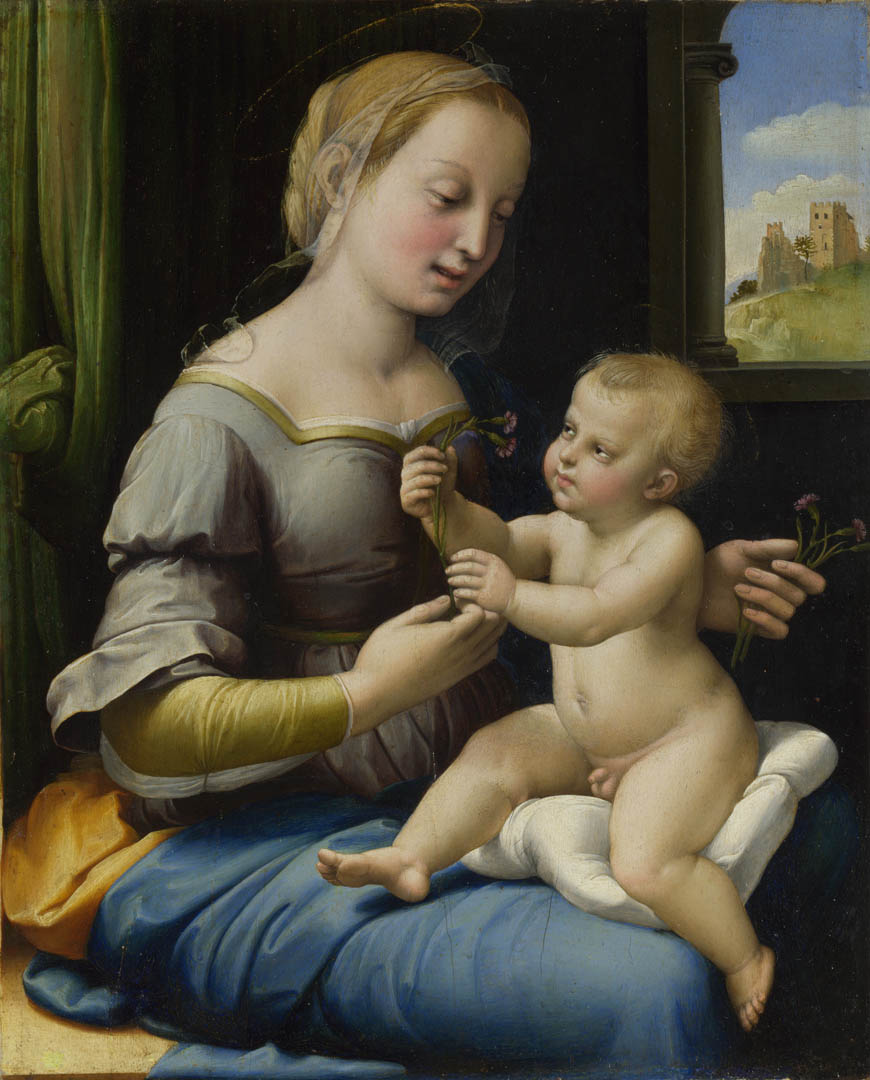
Madonna of the Pinks, c. 1506–7, National Gallery, London

Bull notably performed conservation treatment on Raphael's Madonna of the Pinks.

== Publications ==
- Bull, David (1993). "The Feast of the Gods: Conservation and Investigation". In Manca, Joseph (ed.). Titian 500. Studies in the History of Art. Vol. 45. Washington: National Gallery of Art. pp. 367–373. ISBN 089468194X.
- Bull, David; Plesters, Joyce (1990). The Feast of the Gods: Conservation, Examination and Interpretation. Studies in the History of Art. Vol. 40. Washington: National Gallery of Art. ISBN 9780894681448.
- Bull, David (2013). Barbour, Daphne; Gifford, E. Melanie (eds.). "The Cleaning and Restoration of Jan van Eyck's Washington Annunciation". Facture. Vol. 1. Washington. pp. 156–166.
