= Michael Bull =

British academic

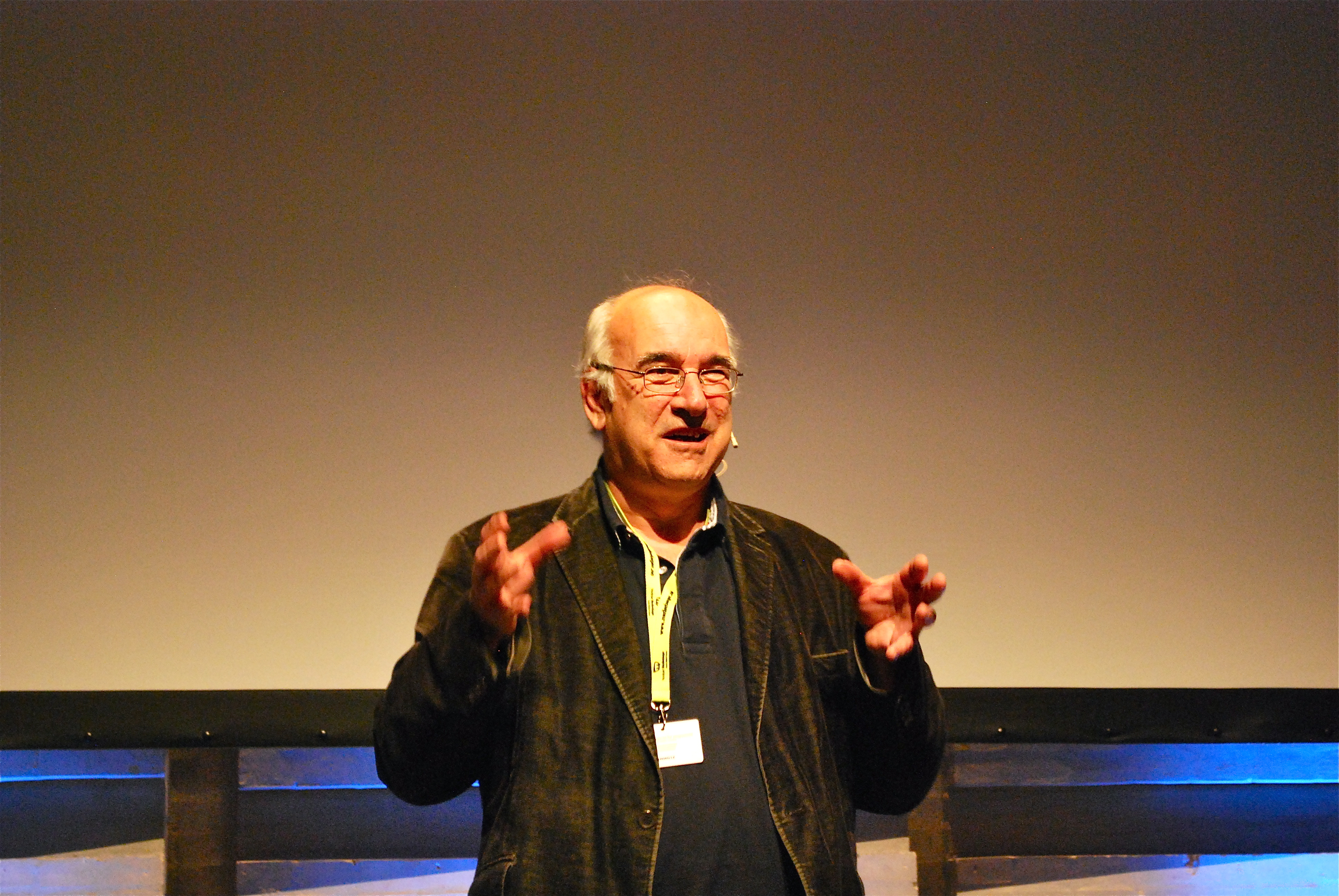
Michael Bull, 2012

Michael Bull was a professor in Sound Studies in the Department of Media and Film at the University of Sussex, England. He is now an emeritus professor of Sound Studies. His Festschrift was presented on 24th September 2025 in Lewes at a celebratory gathering.

== Background ==
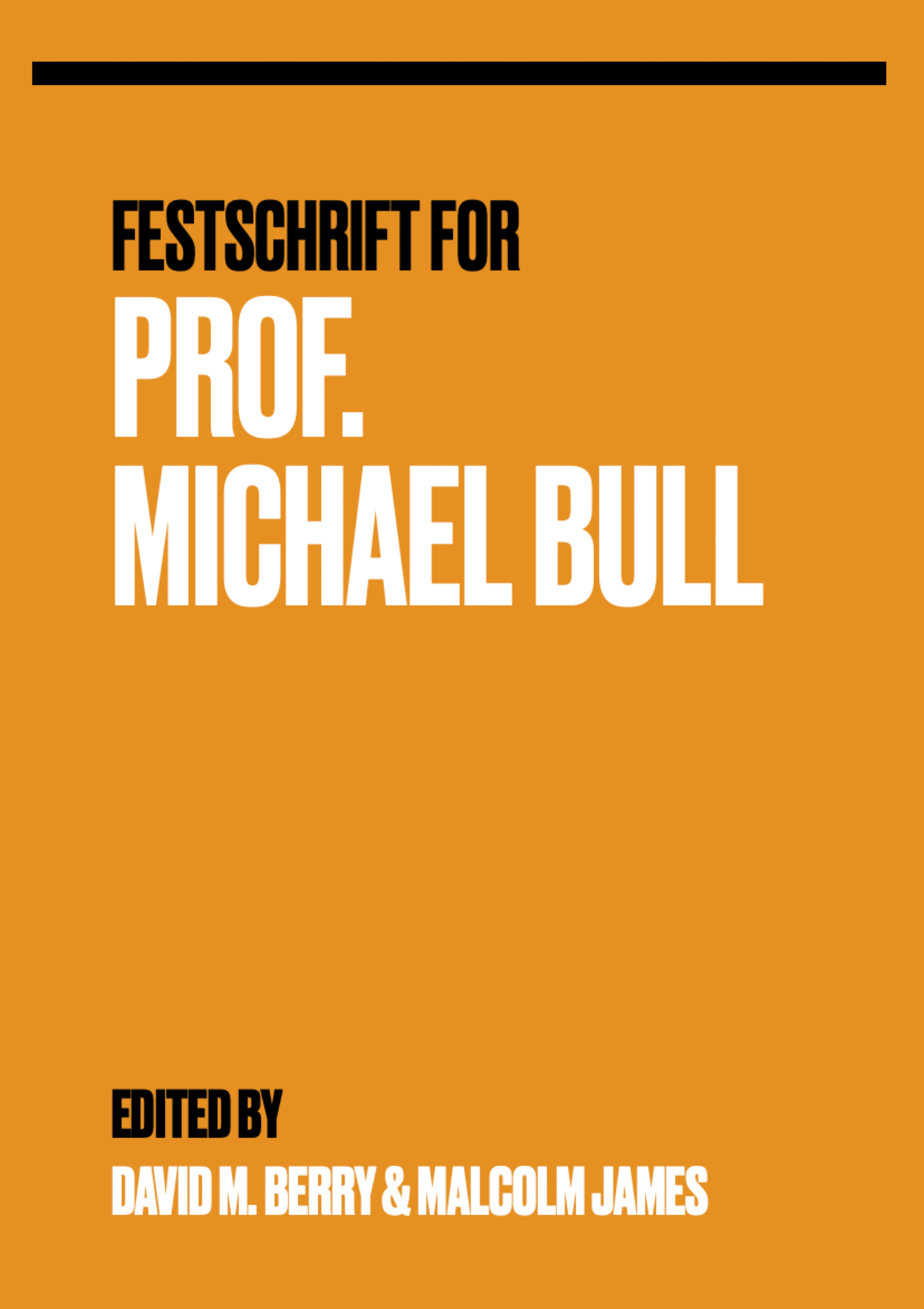
Festschrift for Prof. Michael Bull (2025)

Bull is one of the founders of the academic discipline of "sound studies". He has published research on mobile communications, music and sound in urban culture and is often quoted by journalists penning articles about mobile technology devices and was dubbed "Professor iPod" by Wired Magazine. Bull published the books: Sounding Out the City and Sound Moves, iPod Culture and Urban Experience. Bull is Editor of the journal Senses and Society and the book Sound Studies: Critical Concepts in Media and Cultural Studies.
