= Struggle Front for the National Independence of Guinea =

Political movement in Guinea-Bissau

The Struggle Front for the National Independence of Guinea (Portuguese: Frente de Luta pela Independência Nacional da Guiné, FLING) was a political movement in Guinea-Bissau. Founded by groups opposed to the Marxist doctrine of Amílcar Cabral and the African Party for the Independence of Guinea and Cape Verde (PAIGC), FLING played a minor role in the national liberation struggle against Portuguese colonial rule.

The national trade union federation União Geral dos Trabalhadores de Guiné Bissau was linked to FLING in the pre-independence period.

== History ==
FLING was founded in Dakar, Senegal on 3 August 1962 as an alliance of seven parties, including the Liberation Movement of Guinea, the Guinean People's Union and the Union of Natives of Portuguese Guinea. Unlike the rival PAIGC, it called for the separation of Guinea-Bissau and the Cape Verde islands, and gained support from Manjack diaspora in Senegal, France and Gambia.

It conducted some military action around the northern border near Susana and São Domingos in the early 1960s, but after resisting attempts from the Organisation of African Unity to merge with the PAIGC, the organisation played little part in the war of independence. The PAIGC saw FLING as a threat and its members were violently persecuted, and in certain cases, murdered.

When multi-party politics was introduced in the 1990s, FLING was legalised on 24 May 1992. It contested the 1994 general elections and won a seat in the National People's Assembly. In the presidential elections it put forward François Mendy, who had been its leader since the 1960s. Mendy came fifth with 3% of the vote, but took the party's sole Assembly seat.

A leadership crisis saw José Catengul Mendes become leader by the 1999 elections. The party lost its seat in the Assembly, and Mendes came tenth in the presidential election with just 1.4% of the vote. In 2003 the party joined the United Platform alliance, which contested the 2004 Assembly elections, but failed to win a seat.

== See also ==
- Benjamin Pinto Bull
