= Everett L. Bull =

American computer scientist

Everett "Rett" L. Bull (born August 16, 1949) is an American computer scientist. He is the Emeritus Professor of Computer Science at Pomona College in Claremont, California, and held the Osler-Loucks Professor of Science and Professor of Computer Science endowed chair.

== Early life and education ==
Bull earned his bachelor's degree from Pomona College, graduating in 1971 with a degree in mathematics. He then completed a doctorate at the Massachusetts Institute of Technology in 1976.

== Career ==
Bull began teaching at Pomona in 1981.

== Personal life ==
Bull is married to Jill S. Grigsby, a retired sociologist at Pomona.
