= Desmond Bull =

Australian cricketer

Personal information
- Full name: Desmond Frederick Earl Bull
- Born: 13 August 1935; Brisbane, Queensland, Australia
- Died: 4 November 2015 (aged 80)
- Batting: Left-handed
- Bowling: Left-arm medium-pace
- Role: Batsman

Domestic team information
- Years: Team
- 1956-57 to 1967-68: Queensland

Career statistics
Competition	First-class
Matches	68
Runs scored	3292
Batting average	29.92
100s/50s	5/19
Top score	167*
Balls bowled	224
Wickets	0
Bowling average	–
5 wickets in innings	0
10 wickets in match	0
Best bowling	–
Catches/stumpings	27/–
- Source: Cricinfo, 18 April 2022

Desmond Bull (13 August 1935 – 4 November 2015) was an Australian cricketer. He played in 68 first-class matches for Queensland between 1956 and 1968.

== See also ==
- List of Queensland first-class cricketers
