= Thomas Bull (settler) =

American settler (died 1684)

Captain Thomas Bull
- Born: c. 1605; Great Britain
- Died: October 12, 1684; Hartford, CT
- Occupations: Army Officer; Merchant
- Spouse: Susannah Bull
- Children: Thomas Bull; David Bull; Ruth Bull Boardman; Jonathan Bull; Abigail Bull; Joseph Bull; Susannah Bull Bunce

Thomas Bull (c. 1605 – October 12, 1684), also known as Captain Thomas Bull, was an early settler in the Connecticut Colony who is counted as one of the founders of Hartford, Connecticut.

== Pequot War ==
Bull arrived in Hartford in 1636, having accompanied Thomas Hooker. He served in the Pequot War of 1637, and in 1653 he was appointed lieutenant of a company raised to fight the Dutch. During the Pequot War Lieutenant Bull, rescued Arthur Smith from Mistick Fort after being severely wounded. Bull was hit with an arrow shot into a hard piece of cheese in his pocket, having no other defence. Which may verify the old saying, "A little armor would serve if a man knew where to place it". For his service in the Pequot War he was granted a large tract of land near the Niantic River in what is now the town of East Lyme, Connecticut.

== Connecticut-New York boundary dispute ==
Coat of Arms of Thomas Bull

In 1675 Captain Bull was in command of the Connecticut Colony militia at Fort Saybrook at the mouth of the Connecticut River when Sir Edmund Andros Governor of New York attempted to take possession of the Connecticut Colony for the Duke of York. Dutch claims had originally extended as far east as the Connecticut River, but these claims had been ceded in the 1650 Treaty of Hartford, and reduced to a boundary line 20 miles (32 km) east of the Hudson in 1664. York's territorial claim did not acknowledge these, and Andros announced to Connecticut authorities his intentions to reclaim that territory (which included Connecticut capital, Hartford) in early 1675. Connecticut's leaders pointed out the later revisions to Connecticut's boundaries, but Andros pressed his claim, arguing that those revisions had been superseded by York's grant. Andros used the outbreak of King Philip's War in July 1675 as an excuse to go by ship to Connecticut with a small military force to establish the duke's claim. Andros came ashore, had a brief conversation with the fort commander was rebuffed, and read his commission.

[Thomas Bull] was in command as Saybrook, when Governor Andros attempted to gain the place for his master, the Duke of York.When a clerk of Andros insisted upon reading the patent, Captain Bull commanded him in a loud voice to forbear, and then read the protest. Governor Andros, pleased with his bold and soldier-like appearance, said, "What's your name?" He replied, "My name is Bull, sir" "Bull", said the Governor, "It's a pity that your horns are not tipped with silver."

Andros turned his boats around and left Connecticut. This was the full extent of Andros' attempt to claim the territory, but it would be remembered in Connecticut when later attempts were made to assert New York authority. The Society of the Descendants of the Founders of Hartford records that, "the bravery and wisdom which he displayed in his resistance to Andres greatly endeared Capt. Bull to the people of the colony as a gallant and intrepid officer".

== Legacy ==
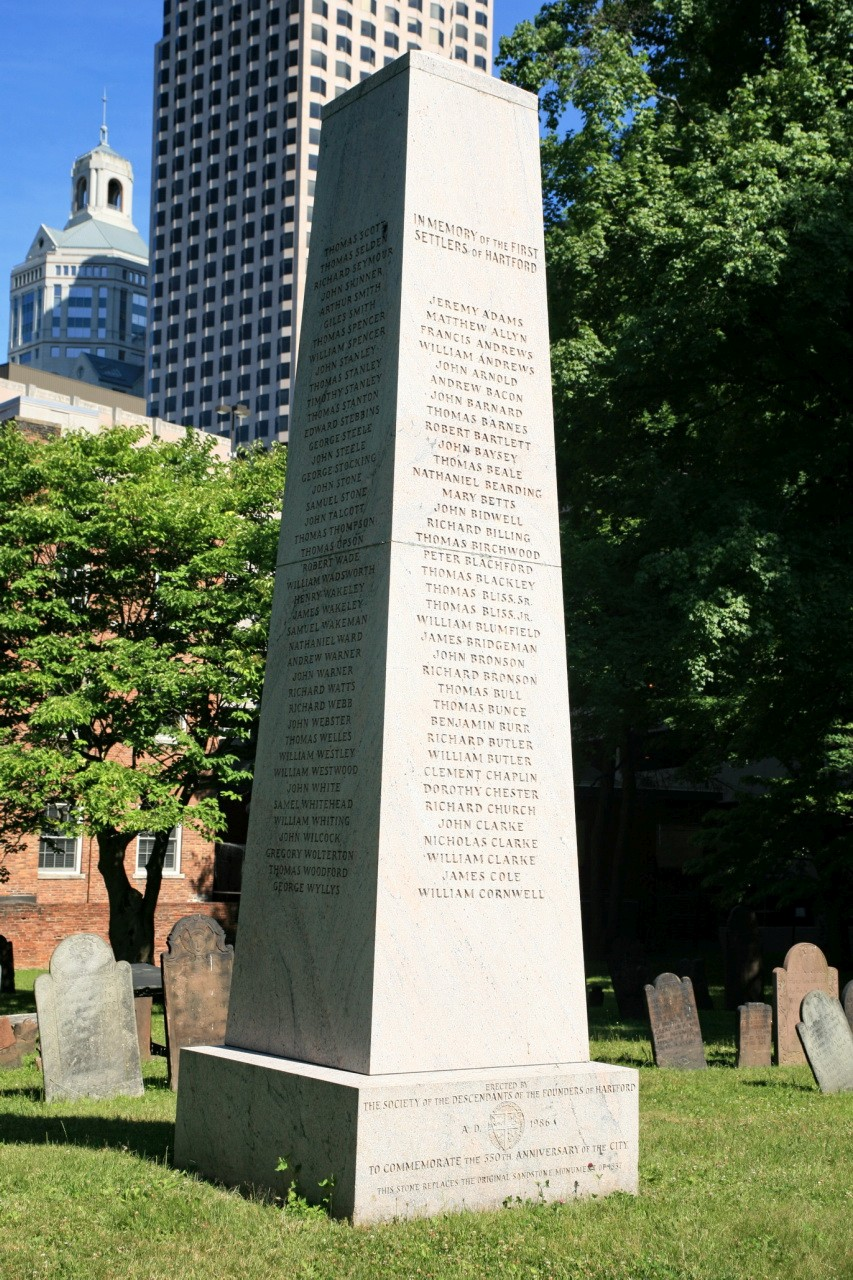
Thomas Bull on the Hartford Founders Monument

John Winthrop, governor of the Massachusetts Bay Colony described Thomas Bull as "a godly and discreet man". Thomas Bull died in October 1684. He was interred alongside his wife, Susannah Bull, in the Central Congregational Church burying ground in Hartford, CT. His monument there reads, "Here lyeth the body of Capt. Thomas Bull, who died October 1684. He was one of the first settlers of Hartford; a lieut. in the great and decisive battle with the Pequots at Mystic May 27th 1637; and Commander of the Fort at Saybrook in July, 1675, when its surrender was demanded by Major Andros".
