= Benjamin Pinto Bull =

Benjamin Pinto Bull (1916 – 25 January 2005) was an activist in Guinea-Bissau, then Portuguese Guinea, who sought his country's independence from Portugal.

He was born into a leading family in Bolama in Portuguese Guinea to Burmester Wilhelm Ellis Bull, from Sierra Leone, and Natália Correia Pinto, of Portuguese and Guinean ancestry, the younger brother of Jaime (or James) Pinto Bull, and received a secondary education in France before entering a seminary at Viana do Castelo in Portugal.

After some time he gave up the idea of becoming a priest and returned to Guinea, where he worked as a customs official. As a nationalist, albeit a non-violent one, Pinto Bull fell foul of the Portuguese State Police (PIDE) and sought sanctuary in Senegal, where he made friends with Léopold Sédar Senghor, the poet-politician who would one day become the first President of Senegal. He made his way to Paris to continue his studies and returned to Senegal to teach in Dakar.

He founded and was first president of the Uniao dos Naturais da Guine Portuguesa (UNGP), a political movement which sought progressive peaceful independence of Guinea from Portugal, contrary to the more revolutionary aims of other independence groups. In 1962 the UNGP joined with the Frente de Luta Pela Independencia Nacional da Guine-Bissau (FLING) and Pinto Bull became a leader in the combined organisation. In July 1963, he held a fruitless meeting, arranged by Léopold Senghor, to discuss his country's independence with António de Oliveira Salazar, the Prime Minister of Portugal.

By this time the revolutionary groups had gone into action and so Pinto Bull withdrew to teach at the University of Dakar until moving in 1984 to teach at universities in Lisbon. By 1973 Guinea-Bissau had achieved its independence.

Pinto Bull died in Lisbon in 2005.
