= François Mendy =

French footballer (born 2000)

Personal information
- Date of birth: 5 April 2000 (age 26)
- Place of birth: Trappes, France
- Height: 1.83 m (6 ft 0 in)
- Position: Forward

Team information
- Current team: Stade Lausanne Ouchy
- Number: 21

Youth career
- 2009–2018: ÉS Trappes
- 2018: Castelroussin

Senior career*
Years	Team	Apps	(Gls)
2018–2023	Châteauroux II	40	(13)
2021–2025	Châteauroux	64	(2)
2025–	Stade Lausanne Ouchy	12	(1)
- * Club domestic league appearances and goals as of 26 May 2026

François Mendy (born 5 April 2000) is a French professional footballer who plays as a forward for Swiss club Stade Lausanne Ouchy.

== Career ==
Mendy is a product of the youth academy of ES Trappes since the age of 9, and briefly moved to Castelroussin in 2018 before signing with the reserve team of Châteauroux. He made his professional debut with Châteauroux in a 2–1 Ligue 2 loss to Clermont Foot on 26 April 2021. On 5 May 2021, he signed his first professional contract with the club for 2 years.

== Personal life ==
Born in France, Mendy is of Bissau guineene and Senegalese descent.
