= Vincents Stoltenberg Bull =

Norwegian engineer and businessperson

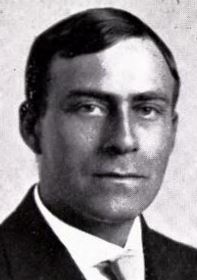
Vincents Stoltenberg Bull.

Vincents Stoltenberg Bull (12 May 1882 – 1 August 1935) was a Norwegian engineer and businessperson.

He was born in Støren, finished his secondary education in 1900 and took officer training in 1901. In 1905 he graduated from Kristiania Technical School. He worked in the Norwegian State Railways from 1905 to 1907 and the Norwegian Water Resources Agency from 1907 to 1923; as chief engineer from 1918. He was a secretary in the Norwegian Engineer and Architect Association from 1906 to 1912. When it changed its name to the Norwegian Engineer Association in 1912, he was the secretary of its Kristiania branch until 1922.

In 1923 he was hired as sub-director in the Norwegian Employers' Confederation and director of the Federation of Norwegian Craftsmen. He was decorated as a Knight of the Order of the Polar Star. He died in August 1935, when his heart stopped while fishing in a small boat together with his outside Brekkestø.
