= Ida Bull =

Archivist, historian, author, and academic

- Occupations: Archivist, historian, author, and academic

Academic background
- Education: PhD in History
- Thesis: De trondhjemske handelshusene på 1700-tallet. Slekt, hushold og forretning (Merchant houses in Trondheim in the 18th century. Family, household and business) (1998)

Ida Bull is an archivist, historian, author, and academic. She is a Professor Emeritus in the Department of Historical Science at the Norwegian University of Science and Technology.

Bull's research interests span fields of history including social history, economic history, local history, and women and gender history, particularly from the era of 1978–1998. She has authored books, including Lokalsamfunnet i verden. Norske lokalsamfunns plass i den første globaliseringen på 1600- til 1800-tallet, and Trondheim 1814 Series: The Royal Norwegian Society of Sciences, Writings 1-2014.

== Education and career ==
Bull received her education in several cities throughout Norway, including Oslo, Bergen, and Trondheim. In 1998, she completed her doctoral degree and presented her dissertation, entitled 'De trondhjemske handelshusene på 1700-tallet. Slekt, hushold og forretning' (Merchant houses in Trondheim in the 18th century. Family, household and business). Following her PhD, she began her academic career as a Lecturer and advanced through the ranks to the position of a professor, before retiring to become Emeritus at the Department of Historical Science at the Norwegian University of Science and Technology.

== Research ==
Bull is known for her research in the economic and social history of Norway during the early modern period and for her work on women and gender history. She has written more than 50 peer-reviewed articles in journals including Scandinavian Journal of History and Historisk Tidsskrift.

=== Gender history ===
Bull's research work on women and gender history is particularly associated with social history and has focused on the matter of widows. She provided insights of widowhood in Scandinavia and explored their role in transferring civil service occupations from one man to the next and mentioned it to be a reason behind making public pensions necessary. She also highlighted the domestic lives of Swedish women during the period of 1600–1857, and their connection with property ownership.

=== Social and local history ===
Bull has worked on Scandinavian social and local history and has discussed different factors associated with it. In her book, Lokalsamfunnet i verden. Norske lokalsamfunns plass i den første globaliseringen på 1600- til 1800-tallet, she discussed the impact of Norway's entry into global trade, from the 16th century to the 19th century, after the discovery of sea routes to Asia and America, and before the country's industrialization, on the local communities. Atle Døssland commended the orderly presentation and explanation of the book and mentioned: "If we follow Ida Bull's presentation a little more closely at the seams, she, as I said, nevertheless brings out moments and concrete examples which indicate that there must have been significant differences between local communities when it comes to contact with the outside world." She also explored the networks of merchant households of Trondheim in the eighteenth century and stated that hierarchical and patriarchal authorities ran in the regional and international contact networks. Later she described the problems associated with generational change and inheritance in the family.

== Bibliography ==
=== Selected books ===
- Katalog over privatarkiv i Statsarkivet i Trondheim (1998) ISBN 82-90802-08-0
- Historie, kritikk og politikk, festsirkft til Per Maurseth (2002) ISBN 82-7765-039-6
- Fra takmark til byens grønne lunge: Trondheim bymark fra de eldste tider til i dag (2006) ISBN 82-519-2122-8

=== Selected articles ===
- Bull, I. (1998). De trondhjemske handelshusene på 1700-tallet: slekt, hushold og forretning. Norges teknisk-naturvitenskapelige universitet.
- Bull, I. (2002). Inheritance in Family Business: The" Long" Merhcant Family: Problems Concerning Generation Change. Scandinavian journal of history, 27(4), 193–210.
- Bull, I. (2007). Foreningsdannelse i norske byer. Borgerlig offentlighet, kjønn og politisk kultur. Heimen, 44(4), 311–24.
- Bull, I. (2013). Kunnskap-hver etter sin stand og sitt kjønn. Utdanning i norske byer på 1700-tallet. Akademika forlag.
- Dørum, K., Bull, I., Droste, H., Henningsen, L. N., Johannessen, F. E., Katajala, K., ... & Ørnbjerg, J. (2022). Hvem styrte byene? Nordisk byhistorie 1500–1800.
