= Robert Bull =

Royal Horse Artillery officer (1778–1835)

Robert Alexander Bull CB, KH
- Born: 3 March 1778; Stafford, Staffordshire
- Died: 17 April 1835 (aged 57); Bath, Somerset
- Military career
- Allegiance: Great Britain; United Kingdom
- Service: British Army
- Service years: 1794–1834
- Rank: Lieutenant colonel
- Commands: I Troop (Bull's) RHA
- Battles: Peninsular War; Battle of Casal Novo; Battle of Foz de Arouce; Battle of Sabugal; Battle of Fuentes de Oñoro; Waterloo campaign; Battle of Waterloo

Lieutenant colonel Robert Alexander Bull, CB, KH (3 March 1778 – 17 April 1835), of the Royal Horse Artillery, was an officer in the British Army who fought in many battles of the Napoleonic Wars.

== Life ==
Robert Alexander Bull was born at Stafford, Staffordshire, on 3 March 1778. He entered the Royal Artillery in 1794, and saw service in the West Indies in 1796–1798. He commanded I Troop (Bull's) Royal Horse Artillery in the Peninsular. At Waterloo "his troop effected the greatest possible service throughout the early part of the battle; but owing to the loss sustained both in men and horses, together with the disabled condition of the guns (through incessant firing) it was obliged to retire before the close." He was brevetted lieutenant colonel for Waterloo.

He retired on full pay in 1834. In retirement, he lived in Queen Square, Bath. He died at Bath on 17 April 1835, aged 57, and was buried in Queen Square Chapel on 23 April.

His son, John Edward Bull (1806–1901) followed his father into the land service and later became a prominent settler in the Colony of New South Wales.

== Sources ==
- Bromley, Janet; Bromley, David (2012). Wellington's Men Remembered. Vol. 1: A–L. Great Britain: The Praetorian Press. p. 1820.
- Dalton, Charles (1904). The Waterloo Roll Call, with Biographical Notes and Anecdotes. 2nd ed. London: Eyre and Spottiswoode. p. 212.
- Grant, Donald (1969). "Bull, John Edward (1806–1901)". Australian Dictionary of Biography (online ed.). National Centre of Biography, Australian National University. Accessed 10 May 2023.
- "Robert Alexander Bull". Bath Record Office. 2021. Accessed 10 May 2023.
