= John Edward Bull =

- Born: 11 October 1806; Athlone, Ireland
- Died: 25 May 1901 (aged 94); Varroville, New South Wales
- Military career
- Allegiance: United Kingdom; Australia
- Service: British Army
- Rank: Colonel

Colonel John Edward Newell Bull (1806–1901) of the 78th Highlanders and 99th Regiment was an officer in the British Army and a prominent settler and public servant in the Colony of New South Wales.

== Origins ==
John Edward Bull was born on 11 October 1806 at Athlone, Ireland, the second son of Colonel Robert Bull, CB, KH, who served throughout the Peninsula campaign and commanded the I troop Royal Horse Artillery at the battle of Waterloo.

== Australia ==
Bull came to Australia in 1842 after being transferred from the 78th Highlanders to 99th Regiment and was put in charge of overseeing Irish convicts bound for Hobart Town. In November 1842 he arrived in Sydney, where he was sworn in as a magistrate. In late 1842 Bull was appointed assistant engineer and superintendent of convict road-gangs on the Western Road from Emu Plains to Bathurst. He established his headquarters at an existing convict camp near Woodford with about 60 men of the 99th regiment. In 1844 he moved the convict road-gang of some 130 convicts and 40 military personnel to Blackheath. The convict stockade operated until 1 April 1849 when work on The Western Road to Bathurst moved further west. The convicts were transferred to Cockatoo Island in Sydney Harbour following the abolishment of road-gangs. The Blackheath convict stockade as the last convict stockade in NSW. Following the abolishment, Bull transferred to civil employment until 1852, including working on the breakwater of Nobbys Head at Newcastle.

After residing in the colony for ten years in 1852 he went to Victoria, where he was appointed a commissioner of crown lands in Victoria and soon after as a resident commissioner on the Bendigo goldfields in October 1852 during the Victorian gold rush. In 1853, Bull assumed control of the Mount Alexander goldfields after William Wright, chief commissioner of the goldfields, transferred his headquarters to Melbourne following appointment as a member of the Victorian Legislative Council. As resident commissioner of Mount Alexander he supervise the establishment of the then town of Castlemaine. He also supervised the areas of Mount Franklin, Yandoit, the Loddon, Fryer's Creek, Tarrengower. Bull also at times assumed control of Avoca, Dunolly and Maryborough.

Bull residing there until three years before his death, when he returned to New South Wales and resided with either his grandson or his daughter till the time of his death. He died at his daughter's residence, or else the residence of his grandson, Robert Raymond, at Varroville, about 6 mi (9.7 km) from Goulburn, on Saturday 25 May 1901, aged ninety-four. He left a widow aged ninety-three. The remains were interred in the Church of England cemetery at 4 p.m. on 28 May.

== Sources ==
- Grant, Donald (1969). "Bull, John Edward (1806–1901)". Australian Dictionary of Biography (online ed.). National Centre of Biography, Australian National University. Accessed 10 May 2023.
- "Obituary". Goulburn Herald. Monday, 27 May 1901. p. 3.
- "Country News". Sydney Morning Herald. Tuesday, 28 May 1901. p. 3.
