= Dave Bull =

Bishop of Buckingham since 2025

David Thomas Bull (born 1972) is a British Anglican bishop. Since 2025, he has served as Bishop of Buckingham, a suffragan bishop in the Church of England's Diocese of Oxford.

== Biography ==
Bull was educated at Worcester College, Oxford and trained for the priesthood at Wycliffe Hall, Oxford. After a curacy at St. Mary, Reigate he became team rector of the Marlow Area Ministry

On 27 February 2025, he was consecrated as a bishop during a service at Canterbury Cathedral by Stephen Cottrell, Archbishop of York.
