= Anthony Bull =

British transport engineer (1908-2004)

Anthony Bull CBE CStJ (18 July 1908 – 23 December 2004) was a British transport engineer and was president of the Institute of Transport.

== Background and education ==
The son of Sir William James Bull, MP (1863–1931), who was created a Baronet in 1922, and his wife Lillian Hester Brandon, Anthony Bull was educated at Gresham's School, Holt (1922–1926), and Magdalene College, Cambridge (1926–1929). He gained the Cambridge degree of MA in 1933.

Bull was the third of four brothers. The eldest, Sir Stephen John Bull, 2nd Baronet (1904–1942), was killed on active service in Java, East Indies. The next, Sir George Bull, 3rd Baronet (1906–1986) inherited the title, which passed to his son, Anthony Bull's nephew, Sir Simeon Bull, 4th Baronet (born 1934).

== Career ==
After Cambridge, he joined London Transport.

At the outbreak of World War II, Bull joined the Transportation Branch of the War Office, then was commissioned as a lieutenant-colonel into the Royal Engineers. He went to Africa to work on the Afloc Plan, a logistical scheme to support the British Eighth Army by transporting supplies for it from the mouth of the River Congo to the River Nile and Egypt, by river, road and rail, avoiding the U-boats in the Mediterranean.

In 1943, he transferred first to GCHQ Middle East, then to the headquarters in Kandy of Lord Mountbatten, Supreme Allied Commander South East Asia.

After leaving the army, Bull returned to his career with London Transport as its chief Staff and Welfare Officer. In 1955, he became a member of the London Transport Executive, joined the London Transport Board in 1962 and was its vice chairman, 1965–1970 and vice chairman of its successor, the Greater London Council run London Transport Executive from 1970 to 1971. After that, until 1987 he worked as a consultant on underground railway systems around the world, based in London.

He became President of the Institute of Transport in 1969. He died in London in 2004 aged 96.

== Honours ==
- Officer of the Order of the British Empire, 1943
- Bronze Star (U.S. decoration), 1945
- Commander of the Order of the British Empire, 1968
- President of the Institute of Transport, 1969
- Companion of the Most Venerable Order of the Hospital of St John of Jerusalem

== Family ==
On 5 October 1946, Bull married Barbara Donovan, daughter of Peter Donovan, whom he had met in Kandy in 1943 when she was a Wren. They had one daughter, Caroline (born 11 July 1947), but Barbara Bull died of polio on 18 October 1947. Caroline became a barrister and in 1974 married Sir Robert Chichester-Clark, as his second wife. Chichester-Clark is the brother of Lord Moyola and Penelope Hobhouse. They had two sons, Adam and Thomas.

== Club ==
Anthony Bull joined London's Oxford and Cambridge Club in 1930 and was a member for 74 years. When he died at the age of 96 in 2004, he was the Father of the Club.
