= Fredrik Rosing Bull =

Norwegian scientist (1882–1925)

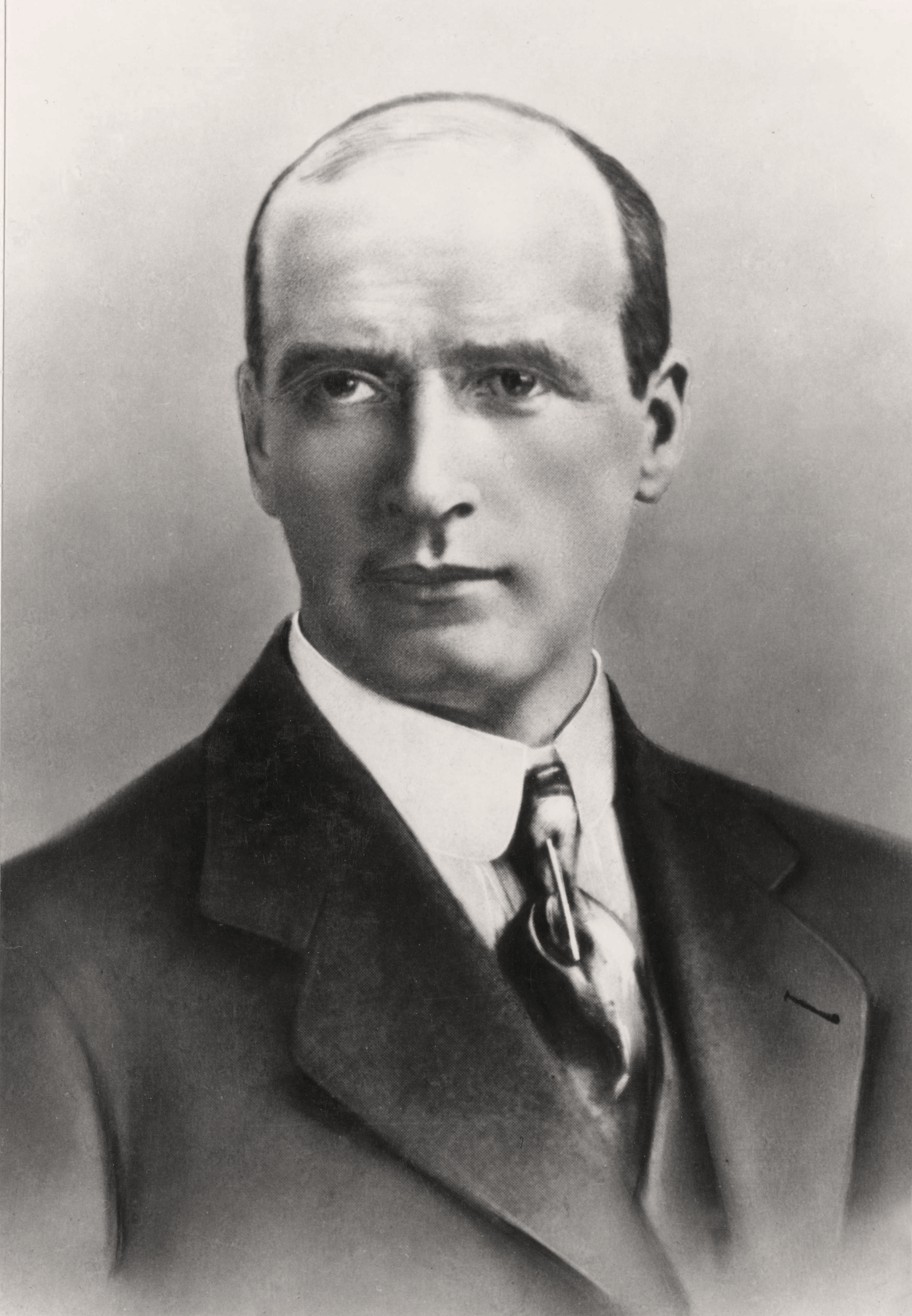
- Born: 25 December 1882; Kristiania, Sweden–Norway
- Died: 7 June 1925 (aged 42); Oslo, Norway
- Known for: The Bull machine

Fredrik Rosing Bull (Norwegian: [bʉl]; 25 December 1882 – 7 June 1925) was a Norwegian scientist, information technology pioneer, known for his work on improved punched card machines. Bull was born in Kristiania (Oslo, Norway). In 1907, he finished his studies in civil engineering at the Technical School of Kristiania. In 1916, he was hired as a technical inspector for the insurance company Storebrand, where he developed an interest for punched card technology and began developing one of his own. In 1919, he obtained a patent for his machine, and in 1921 he prepared a team that took over the implementation of the machine at Storebrand. This team provided several new ideas for improving the Bull machine, rendering it superior to Herman Hollerith's device, the precursor to the IBM punched card machine, in use at that time. Bull continued to develop his ideas and improve the machine, which became a success throughout Europe. He was diagnosed with cancer in 1924 and died in 1925 at the age of 42. His patents were later sold in 1931 and constituted the basis for the founding of the French company Groupe Bull, a large information technology company operating in over 100 countries.

== Family ==
Fredrik Bull was born in Kristiania (the present-day Oslo) to Ole Bornemann Bull (1842–1916) and his first wife Marie Cathrine Lund (1843–1884). Dr. Ole Bull was a renowned eye doctor. He collaborated with Gerhard Armauer Hansen who discovered Mycobacterium leprae, the causative agent of leprosy, while investigating the effects of leprosy on the eyes. He is also known for having developed a method to determine the degree of sensation of color.

Fredrik was raised in a large family. He was the eighth of fifteen children. The Bull family had a passion for technology and science: all of Fredrik's older brothers were engineers. His brother Anders Henrik Bull is known for his studies in wireless radiotelegraphy.

== Education ==
Fredrik Rosing Bull began his studies in civil engineering at the reputable Technical School of Kristiania (now Oslo ingeniørhøgskole) in 1904 and graduated in 1907. He scored some of the best marks in class.

== Storebrand ==
In 1916 he was hired as a technical inspector at the insurance company Storebrand where he came into contact with the tabulating machines of those days.

The punched cards and the tabulating machines were initially developed by US engineer Herman Hollerith and were used for first time in Norway by Statistics Norway in 1894.

Fredrik Bull was sent abroad to study Hollerith's systems, returning with the conviction that Hollerith's systems were expensive and unstable. He was convinced that he could develop a device that was cheaper and more efficient than Hollerith's. As a result, Bull convinced his employer, Storebrand, to pay him an advance of $10,000 to develop a new machine. The terms of the deal required the advance to be repaid in full if the machine was not successful.

Bull's plan was to use electromagnetic technology like Hollerith, but with many improvements. The use of 45 column punched cards enabled the machine to read the information while making contact through the holes. This method allowed faster processing of information. The machines in use at that time required significant manual intervention to operate. Bull made several improvements to automate processing, such as standardization of punched-cards and pre-selection.

== Bull's first machine ==
Bull needed nearly two years to produce a finished product. The machine was presented to the Storebrand directors at his workshop on 12 January 1921 and subsequently purchased for the sum of 20,000 pounds on 21 January 1921. The machine was not successful because it was not as efficient, stable and reliable as expected. It was operational until 1926.

Around that time Bull contacted a friend from high school in Nordstrand Reidar Knutsen, who headed the company A/S Oka. Through Reidar he met Knut Andreas Knutsen, Reidar's younger brother, who was an engineer. He and Bull began collaborating.

== The Bull machine ==
On 31 July 1919 Bull obtained a patent for his design. The patent describes in detail his idea of a programmable tabulating machine. The new machine itself was not completed until 1923 and was referred to as a 'ordering, recording and adding machine'. After its initial success Bull undertook the production of new copies of his T-30 machine, adding improvements as he went. Several insurance companies in Denmark showed interest in the technology.

Fredrik then signed a contract with the Oka company led by [Reidar Knutsen, which assumed the costs of manufacturing and marketing. The production of these machines was in a precision workshop in Kristiania.

The Bull machine used punched card of 45 columns, with round holes and a rotating adder. His machine was substantially better than its competition, Hollerith and Powers, through the mechanism of punched card pre-selection.

The machine proved a success and received very good reviews and publicity The key factors for success were the technical quality of the machine, the ease of use, the new pre-selection technology, the cost savings and the opportunity for users to avoid IBM's monopoly and purchase their own equipment instead of renting it.

== Other patents ==
Bull continued working on improvements for the machine and also in developing new machines such as a sorting machine and a new tabulating machine.

Some of the notable improvements were: the change of switches that controlled the entry of punched cards and the expansion device in larger scale.

The reading device was the most critical part of the machine. Built with electrical conducting springs, these passed through the holes of the punched cards, causing the information to be recorded by electrical contact. He obtained the ideas for this machine by stealing the notes of Henrik Hartzner, his Danish partner. One of the main problems of this method was the low durability of the material of the cards, which meant that the method did not always function correctly. Another problem was the dust that entered the holes of the contacts. One major problem Bull and Knutsen had was that because of the nature of the contacts, sparks were created causing the machine to crash frequently. All these details were being constantly improved.

Production of Bull machines was rather slow. Two machines were produced in 1921, another two in each of the subsequent years (1922 and 1923), ramping up to four in 1924, and to six in 1925. These machines were sold to companies in Norway, Denmark, Finland and Switzerland. There were constant problems with the machines. Knut Andreas Knutsen was constantly traveling to these countries for repair and modifications at client sites.

== Illness and death ==
In the summer of 1924 Bull was diagnosed with cancer, a disease that ended his life on 7 June 1925 when Bull was 42 years old.

Despite the diagnosis in the summer of 1924, Bull continued to work until his condition worsened in the fall of that year. In the last few days, he shared his latest ideas with Knutsen. Bull's patent rights were acquired by Oka, where Knutsen, loyal to the ideas of Bull, continued the improvement of the machine and the expansion of the company. Knutsen focused on new designs to record tabulation results on paper forms, sorted numerically and alphabetically. He was the first to use printing wheel methods.

== Groupe Bull ==
The years following Bull's death, 1926, 1927 and 1928 were years of difficulty but also of joys and surprises. The machines installed and leased to Swiss companies had attracted great interest in Switzerland. In 1927, the Belgian Émile Genon, bought the patents to operate in the European continent (excluding Scandinavia). In 1928 he got in agreement with the Swiss company H.W. Egli in order to produce Bull machines. Production began in 1929.

Later Genon aware of the improvements Knutsen was bringing in Scandinavia also tried to improve on his patents, the technology of the vertical sorting machine and printing. He finally hired Knutsen who was given the place of chief engineer of H.W. Egli. This was accepted by Knutsen with the condition of the company to moving to France where there was more to reach the market. So, in 1931 H.W. Egli Bull based in Paris was founded. Two years later, in 1933, the company underwent a reorganization and suffered a name change, Compagnie des Machines Bull, the current Groupe Bull. Knutsen continued as chief engineer until his retirement in 1958.
