= David Roger Bull =

English engineer

David Roger Bull FIEE (born September 1957) is an English engineer and professor at the University of Bristol. He was named a Fellow of the Institute of Electrical and Electronics Engineers (IEE) in 2013 for contributions in video analysis, compression and communications.
