= David Bull (Scouting) =

English scouting leader

David Bull OBE

International Commissioner of The Scout Association

Personal details
- Born: 1944 (age 81–82)

David Bull OBE (born 1944) is an Englishman who served as the International Commissioner of The Scout Association, as well as the Chairman of the European Scout Committee.

== Education and career ==
In 2006, Bull was awarded the 309th Bronze Wolf, the only distinction of the World Organization of the Scout Movement, awarded by the World Scout Committee for exceptional services to world Scouting.

Bull studied law at Plymouth University. He is a charity trustee and supporter of the National Health Service, a trustee at Chester and District Scout Council, a member of the Council of Governors at Cheshire and Wirral Partnership, Trustee/Secretary at British Scouting Overseas, and Chair of the Board of Trustees at Chester Voluntary Action. Personal life

He is married, has lived in Poole, Dorset, and lives in Chester.

== Recognition ==
He was appointed an Officer of the Order of the British Empire in the 2015 New Year Honours, for services to young people through the Scout movement.
