= William Bull (landowner) =

Australian settler

William Thomas Bull
- Born: 21 August 1867; Ballarat, Victoria
- Died: 3 February 1956 (aged 88); Deniliquin, New South Wales
- Occupation: Landowner
- Spouse: Marion Augusta Agnes Bull
- Children: William, Stuart, Ella (Lynch), John, Donald and Lloyd
- Parent(s): Thomas William Bull, Emily Bull (nee Lanyon)

William T Bull (right), Banna Avenue, Griffith, NSW, Australia, 1929

William Thomas Bull (1867–1956) was an early Australian landowner in the Riverina region, Australia.

William Bull came to the Riverina in 1884 with his father Thomas Bull from Ballarat and the Western District of Victoria. Later other members of the family joined them and they took up land in the Jondaryan region (now known as Griffith). They suffered horrific droughts during 1896 and 1899 in which the Jondaryan district survived thanks to William Bull's well which was 134 feet (41 m) deep. The property they owned became part of the De Bortoli vineyard estate. De Bortoli started a brewery named the "William Bull Brewery" in his honour.

During the 1900s when things were starting to go well the government resumed the land for irrigation and William Bull (who married in 1911) who was now 45 years of age had to start all over again. The family and other settlers scattered in all directions. William Bull purchased 5,000 acres (20 km^{2}) from Sir Samuel McCaughey on Goolgumbla station out of Jerilderie.

He retired to Deniliquin where he died on 3 February 1956 and is buried in the Deniliquin cemetery with his wife Agnes.

The New South Wales village of Bilbul (located 6 kilometres north-east of Griffith) was named in honor of William Bull.
