= Sir Stephen Bull, 2nd Baronet =

English lawyer and baronet

Sir Stephen John Bull, 2nd Baronet (11 October 1904 – 9 March 1942) was an English lawyer and baronet.

== Early life ==
Bull was the son of the Right Hon. Sir William Bull, 1st Baronet MP, of Chelsea, London, a Conservative politician, as well as the brother of Anthony and Peter Bull.

He was educated at Gresham's School, Holt and New College, Oxford. He succeeded to his father's title in 1931.

== Career ==
Bull was admitted a solicitor in 1928, and in 1934 had offices at 3, Stone Buildings, Lincoln's Inn.

He was honorary solicitor to the Royal Life Saving Society, the Royal Society of St George, and the League of Mercy, Liveryman of the Worshipful Company of Mercers of the City of London, Governor of the Upper Latymer Foundation School, Vice-Chairman of South Hammersmith Conservative Association and a member of the Board of Management of the West London Hospital.

== War Service ==
During the Second World War, Bull served with the Royal Air Force in the Far East. He was commissioned as a Pilot officer on 11 October 1940 and was killed at the Fall of Java in March 1942, during the Japanese offensives in the Dutch East Indies.

== Arms ==
Coat of arms of Sir Stephen Bull, 2nd Baronet
Crest A bull’s head caboshed Sable charged on the forehead with the sign of Taurus as in the arms. Escutcheon Sable three astronomical signs of Taurus Or. Motto Hitherto

Baronetage of the United Kingdom
Preceded by William Bull	Bull baronets (of Hammersmith); 1931–1942	Succeeded by George Bull
