= Sir William Bull, 1st Baronet =

British politician (1863–1931)

Sir WIlliam James Bull 1st Baronet, PC
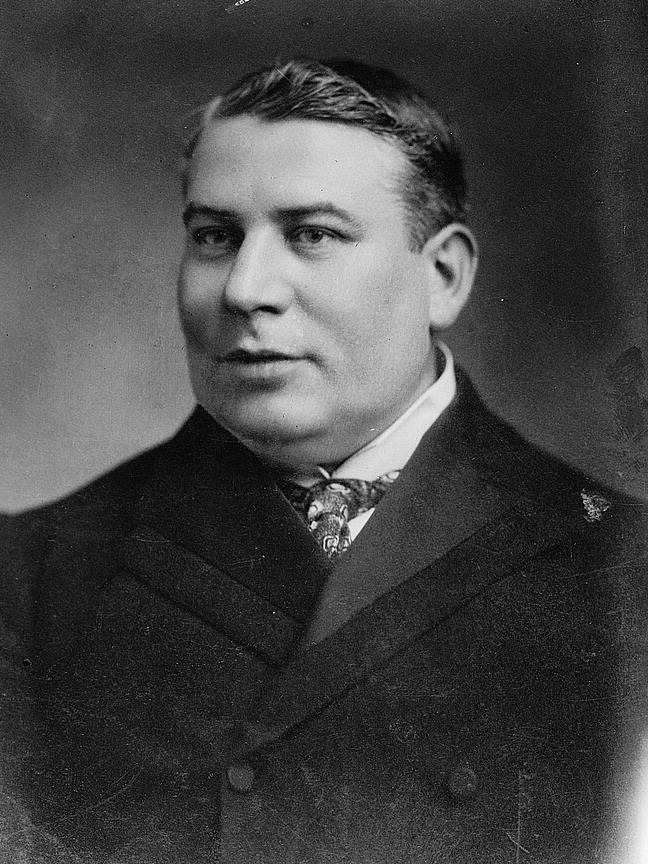
- Sir William Bull in 1913

Member of Parliament for Hammersmith
- In office 1900–1918
- Preceded by: Walter Tuckfield Goldsworthy
- Succeeded by: Constituency abolished

Member of Parliament for Hammersmith South
- In office 1918–1929
- Preceded by: New constituency
- Succeeded by: Daniel Chater

Personal details
- Born: 29 September 1863
- Died: 23 January 1931 (aged 67)
- Resting place: Margravine Cemetery, Hammersmith
- Party: Conservative
- Spouse: Lilian Hester Brandon (m. 1904)
- Children: 4
- Parents: Henry Bull (father); Cecilia Ann Howard (mother)
- Relatives: Anthony Bull (son); Peter Bull (son)

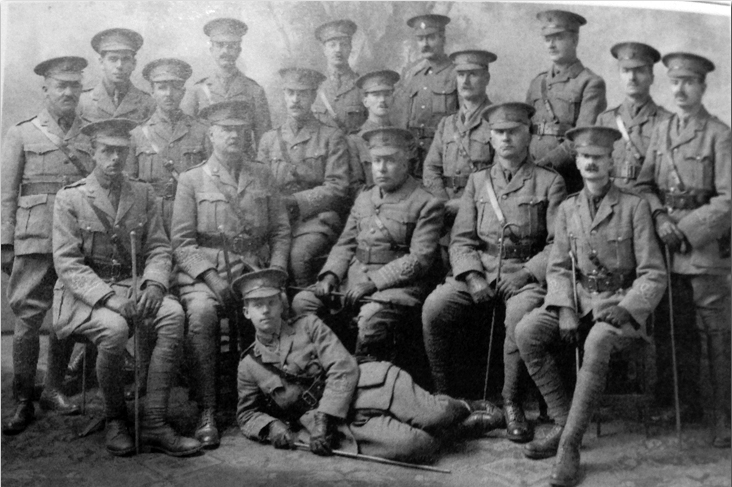
Officers of the C Company of Bushmen (West London Volunteers) 1915. Sir William Bull is in the centre.

Sir William James Bull, 1st Baronet, PC (29 September 1863 – 23 January 1931) was an English solicitor and Conservative Party politician.

== Biography ==
Bull was the son of Henry Bull, a solicitor, and his wife Cecilia Ann Howard, daughter of James Peter Howard. He was returned to Parliament for Hammersmith in 1900, a seat he held until 1918, and then sat for Hammersmith South until 1929.

Bull was knighted in 1905. That year Walter Long became Chief Secretary for Ireland, and Bull was his Parliamentary Private Secretary. A few years later, the Anti-Socialist Union was set up, and Bull served on its executive committee with R. D. Blumenfeld, while Long was a vice-president. He ran Hammersmith meetings for the Union, with those attending having to sign affidavits of opposition to socialism, and ejected hecklers.

Around 1911 Bull became involved with Frederick H. Crawford in running guns to the Ulster Volunteer Force. He did that in partnership with Herbert Augustus Budden, who was married to his sister Charlotte Annie Howard. They used two firms in Hammersmith, one set up as a front and the other a motor parts supplier set up by Bull's former chauffeur. Police seized over four thousand rifles in a 1913 Hammersmith raid, under the Gun Barrel Proof Act 1868. Their informant was Budden.

Bull was a suffragist, on good terms with the Pankhursts. In 1908 he visited Vera Wentworth in prison. In the discussions before the Representation of the People Act 1918, Maud Palmer, Countess of Selborne of the Conservative and Unionist Women's Franchise Association contacted Bull, at the prompting of Millicent Fawcett, to propose a franchise at the 1916 Speaker's Conference called to start a franchise bill. He involved himself in the question of the minimum age at which a woman should be allowed to vote, starting the bidding with 40, which he later claimed had some support. That was certainly not from the Pankhursts, who held out for adult suffrage. The conference settled by 15 votes to 6 on a minimum age of 30. In 1918 Bull drafted a bill to allow for female conscription. He was admitted to the Privy Council that year.

A week before the Carlton Club meeting of 1922 that put an end to the post-war coalition administration, Bull called a smaller meeting of Conservatives. Walter Long, by then in the House of Lords, was invited. It tested the water for a break with Lloyd George, on a group not from the right wing, and determined that they felt the status quo would lead to a split in the party. Bull was that year created a baronet, of Hammersmith in the County of London.

Bull died in January 1931, aged 67. He is buried in Margravine Cemetery, Hammersmith.

== Infrastructure ==
In the late 1890s Bull chaired the Bridges Committee of the London County Council that oversaw the construction of the Blackwall Tunnel. He made an early proposal for a green belt round London, and championed a Channel Tunnel initiative. He also sat on committees that oversaw the repairs to the Palace of Westminster.

== Works ==
Bull published:

- The Book of Limericks (1916), with "Orion" (sports editor William Warren) of The Daily Express, illustrations by Heath Robinson.
- A History of the Broadway Congregational Church, Hammersmith (1923).

== Family ==
Bull married Lilian Hester Brandon, daughter of Gabriel Samuel Brandon, on 5 January 1904. They had four sons. He was succeeded in the baronetcy by his eldest son Stephen. His third son, Anthony Bull, was Chairman of London Transport from 1965 to 1971. His youngest son, Peter Bull, became a well-known actor. Lady Bull died on 3 September 1963.

Coat of arms of Sir William Bull, 1st Baronet
Crest A bull’s head caboshed Sable charged on the forehead with the sign of Taurus as in the arms. Escutcheon Sable three astronomical signs of Taurus Or. Motto Hitherto

Parliament of the United Kingdom
Preceded by Walter Tuckfield Goldsworthy	Member of Parliament for Hammersmith; 1900–1918	Constituency abolished
New constituency	Member of Parliament for Hammersmith South; 1918–1929	Succeeded by Daniel Chater
Baronetage of the United Kingdom
New creation	Baronet (of Hammersmith); 1922–1931	Succeeded by Stephen John Bull
Court offices
Preceded by (none)	Registrar of the Imperial Society of Knights Bachelor; 1908–1911	Succeeded by Sir Harry North
Preceded by Henry Pellatt	Knight Principal of the Imperial Society of Knights Bachelor; 1923–1931	Succeeded by Trevor Dawson
