= David Bull (craftsman) =

Printmaker

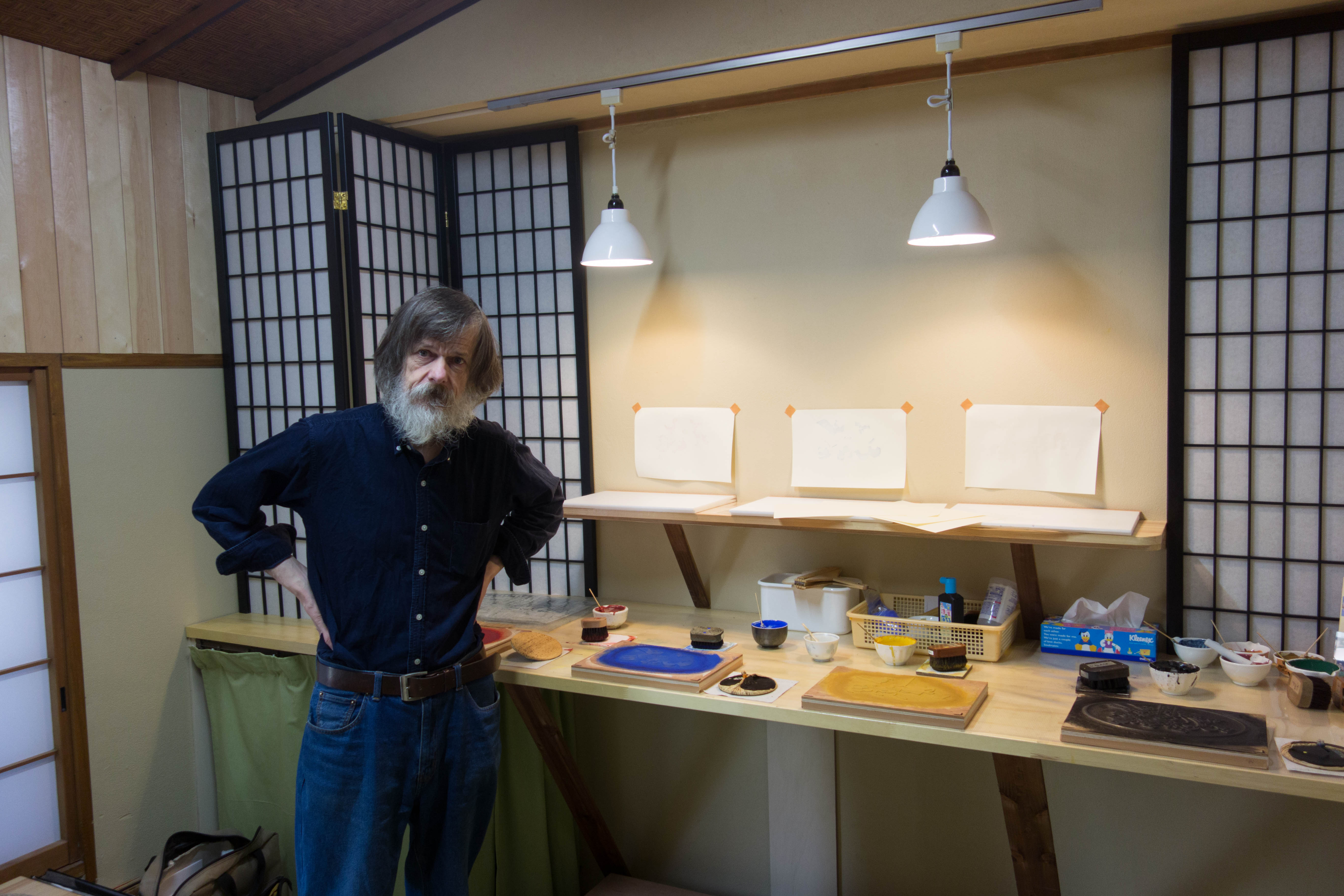
- David Bull in his Mokuhankan print party studio
- Born: 11 November 1951 (age 73); Halifax, England
- Known for: Woodblock printmaker
- Style: Ukiyo-e
- Website: mokuhankan.com woodblock.com

David Bull (born 11 November 1951) is a Canadian ukiyo-e woodblock printer and carver who heads the Mokuhankan studio in Asakusa, Tokyo. Born in Britain, Bull moved to Canada at the age of 5. He first discovered Japanese woodblocks while working in a music shop in 1980 in Toronto, at 28, and started making his own prints without formal training.

Bull moved to Tokyo in 1986 to learn more about traditional Japanese woodblock printing. In 1989, he embarked on a ten-year project to recreate 100 images from Katsukawa Shunsho's 1775 Hyakunin isshu poetry book.

He is known for his work on the Ukiyo-e Heroes kickstarter crowd-funding project together with Jed Henry, recreating modern videogame scenes in ukiyo-e style with traditional woodblock techniques. The Mokuhankan studio has a shop and used to offer “print parties” for amateurs, where they could try the craft of printing. During the pandemic, his shop temporarily shut down for three years, but his shop has now reopened without print parties.

From 2023 to 2024, Bull and Mokuhankan worked with the British Museum to produce 12 prints based on a previously obscure series of drawings by Hokusai which had been rediscovered in 2019 and acquired by the British Museum in 2020.

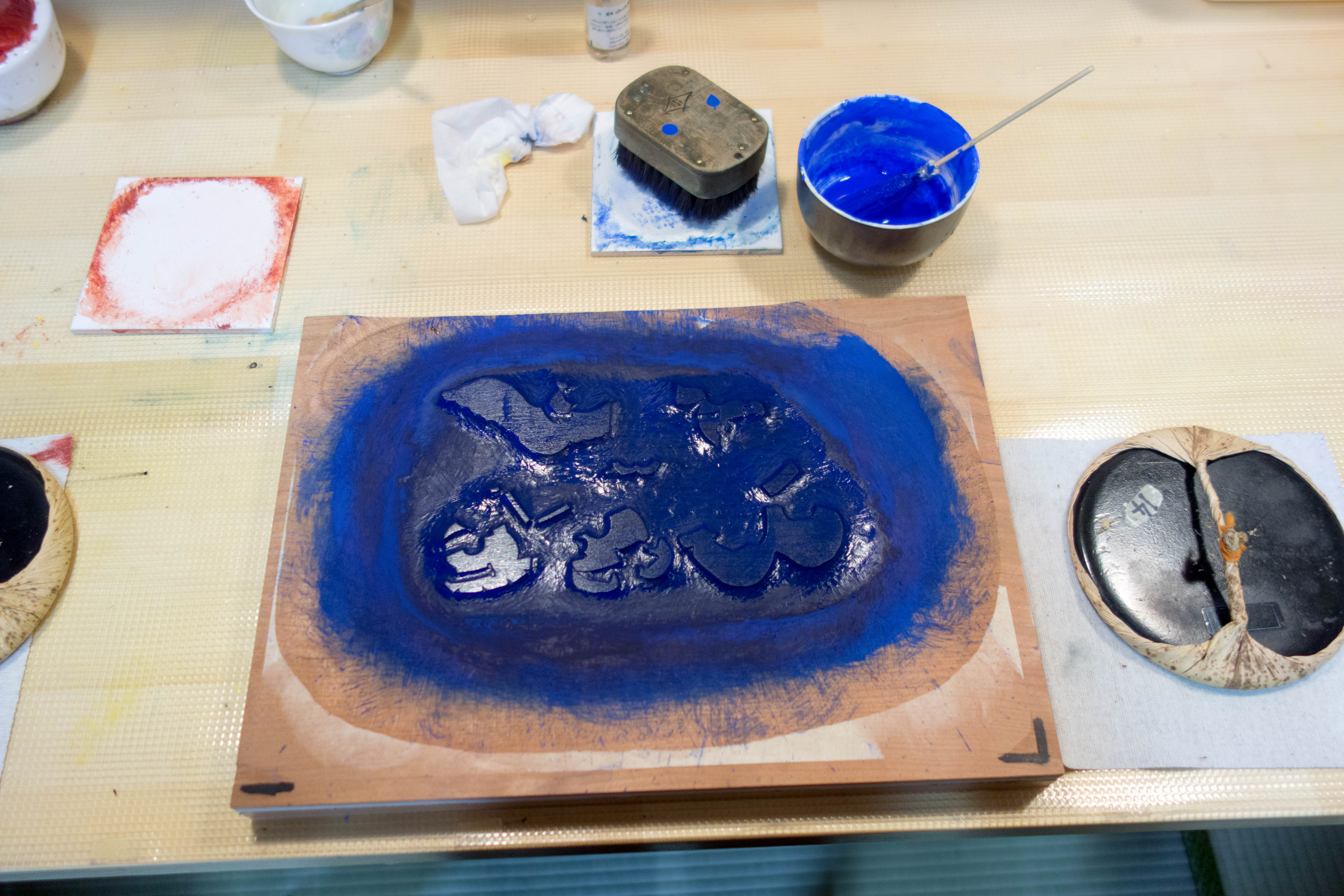
A simple woodblock used in the print parties where amateurs can make their own prints.
