= Johan Bull =

American painter

- Born: November 22, 1893; Oslo, Norway
- Died: September 12, 1945 (aged 51); Stowe, Vermont, United States
- Occupation: Painter

Johan Bull (November 22, 1893 – September 12, 1945) was an American painter. His work was part of the painting event in the art competition at the 1932 Summer Olympics.

Bull was born in Oslo, Norway, the son of Ole Bull and Kaja Steenberg Bull of Stange, Norway. He was the grandnephew of the violinist Ole Bull. Bull emigrated to the United States in 1925. He worked on the staff of The New Yorker. He and his wife, Sonja Geelmuyden Bull (1898–1991), settled at Stowe, Vermont in 1941, where Bull operated a girls' school together with Countess Susie Sparre. He died at his summer home in Stowe, Vermont in 1945.
