= Laura Elvig =

Norwegian actress (1860–1935)

- Born: August 10, 1860; Bergen, Norway
- Died: April 17, 1935 (aged 74); Oslo, Norway
- Occupation: Actress
- Spouse: Bernt Johan Johannessen
- Children: Borghild Johannessen, Svanhild Johannessen
- Parents: Ole Elvig (father); Karen Svendsen (mother)

Laura Christine Theodora Elvig (August 10, 1860 – April 17, 1935) was a Norwegian actress.

== Family ==
Laura Elvig was the daughter of the schoolteacher Ole Elvig and Karen Svendsen. On January 18, 1881 she married the actor Berent Johan Tunæs Johannessen (1859–1907). Their daughter Svanhild Johannessen married the actor Hauk Aabel, and their daughter Borghild Johannessen married the actor Thoralf Klouman. Laura Elvig was the grandmother of the actors Per Aabel and Andreas Aabel, the actress Wenche Klouman, and the pianist Carsten Klouman.

== Career ==
Elvig appeared on stage in her birthplace of Bergen in the 1870s. Among other roles, she performed as of Hilda Rummel in The Pillars of Society by Henrik Ibsen in 1877 at the Comedy House. By her seventieth birthday in 1930, she was the executive producer at the National Theater.

== Selected roles ==
- Hilda Rummel in The Pillars of Society by Henrik Ibsen (Comedy House, Bergen, 1877)
- Mariette in La poule et ses poussins by Émile de Najac (1880)
