= Wenche Klouman =

Norwegian actress (1918–2009)

- Born: May 11, 1918; Kristiania, Norway
- Died: February 8, 2009 (aged 90); Bærum, Norway
- Occupation: Actress
- Spouse(s): Karl Ludvig Bugge, Finn Rønneberg Kerr
- Parents: Thoralf Klouman (father); Borghild Johannessen (mother)
- Relatives: Carsten Klouman

Wenche Klouman (May 11, 1918 – February 8, 2009) was a Norwegian actress.

== Biography ==
Klouman was born on May 11, 1918, in Kristiania, the daughter of the actor and illustrator Thoralf Klouman and the actress Borghild Johannessen. She was the sister of the musician Carsten Klouman. Her grandfather Bernt Johannessen was a prominent actor at the National Theater in Bergen in the second half of the 19th century; he was also the grandfather of the actor Per Aabel, the son of the comedian Hauk Aabel and Svanhild Johannessen, the sister of Borghild Johannessen. Klouman was married to the actor Karl Ludvig Bugge from 1943 to 1948, and then to Finn Rønneberg Kerr from 1950 until his death in 2001.

Klouman debuted at the Oslo New Theater in 1937 and was later engaged with the National Theater in Bergen and especially the Central Theater in Oslo. Klouman appeared in comic plays typical of the time such as Norman Krasna's Dear Ruth, Jens Locher's Tre må man være (It Has to Be Three), and Helge Krog's På solsiden, and in the film Det kunne vært deg. She also played Eliza Doolittle in Pygmalion, operetta roles in Min søster og jeg (a translation of Georges Berr's Ma sœur et moi, My Sister and I) and Die Csárdásfürstin, and a large complex character role in the psychological thriller The Gioconda Smile by Aldous Huxley, in which she delivered a sensational performance. Klouman retired from the stage in the early 1950s, but she later starred in a few so-called housewife films.

== Filmography ==
- 1939: Familien på Borgan as Anne, Berg's daughter
- 1941: The Sausage-Maker Who Disappeared as Malla Hansen
- 1946: To liv as Wenche Nordgaard
- 1948: Trollfossen as the nurse
- 1949: Det gælder os alle as Gerd
- 1949: Lejlighed til leje (Danish) as the cabaret performer Lise Martins
- 1952: Det kunne vært deg
- 1954: Slik kan det gjøres. Husmorfilmen 1954
- 1957: Hjemme hos oss. Husmorfilmen 1957
