= Leif Roschberg =

Norwegian actor (1909–1967)

- Born: Leif Roscher Roschberg; 27 February 1909; Kristiania, Norway
- Died: 10 May 1967 (aged 58); Oslo, Norway
- Other name: Leif Rosenberg
- Occupations: Actor; Dancer; Painter
- Years active: 1927–1967
- Spouse(s): Maria Vogt (m. 1939; div. 1941) Jenny Voigt (m. 1944; div. 1950)
- Relatives: Paal Roschberg (brother)

Leif Roscher Roschberg (27 February 1909 – 10 May 1967), known professionally as one half of the Rocky Twins, was a Norwegian dancer, actor, and painter. He rose to international prominence during the Jazz Age as a symbol of androgynous glamour and high-fashion drag. Alongside his identical twin brother, Paal Roscher Roschberg, he headlined major theatrical revues in Paris, London, and Pre-Code Hollywood before a sudden illness forced him to pivot to a career in the fine arts.

== Early life and education ==
Leif Roscher Roschberg was born in Kristiania (now Oslo), Norway, into a socially prominent family. His father, Adolf Roscher Roschberg, was a colonel in the Norwegian Army, establishing a strict, structured household. Despite this military background, Leif and his identical twin brother, Paal, demonstrated an early aptitude for the arts, co-authoring a book of fairy tales at the age of eleven.

The brothers received a rigorous artistic education in Oslo, studying classical ballet and jazz dance under the prominent instructors Per Aabel and Love Krohn. During these early classes, they trained alongside Sonja Henie, who would later achieve fame as an Olympic figure skater and Hollywood actress. Desiring to polish their performance style, the twins traveled to London and Paris under the official pretext of language studies, a cover used to mitigate their father's disapproval of their theatrical ambitions. Abroad, they developed a sophisticated "continental" performance style that blended athletic choreography with high-fashion aesthetics.

== Career ==
=== The Rocky Twins (1927–1937) ===
In 1927, at the age of 18, the brothers were discovered by European talent scouts and booked for the Parisian revue Les Ailes de Paris at the Casino de Paris. Performing as the Rocky Twins, their most celebrated and popular routine involved dressing in elaborate, identical drag to parody the Dolly Sisters, a famous American dance act of the era. Unlike typical comedic or grotesque female impersonation of the time, the Roschbergs' performance was noted by contemporary reviewers for being "disturbingly beautiful," establishing them as early pioneers of refined theatrical androgyny.

During the late 1920s and early 1930s, the Rocky Twins became prominent figures within Europe's "Pansy Craze"—a period characterized by an increased visibility of LGBTQ+ performers in mainstream nightlife. They headlined at major venues including the Folies Bergère and the Lido. Their pale complexions and striking, dark-haired visual aesthetic earned them the moniker "The Black Orchids of the North" in European press circles. Their rising fame caught the attention of French cabaret icon Mistinguett, who championed their act despite legal threats from the twins' conservative father, who strongly objected to their cross-dressing performances.

=== Hollywood and film ===
In 1932, the twins relocated to Hollywood, California and director Edmund Goulding cast them in the Metro-Goldwyn-Mayer romantic comedy Blondie of the Follies (1932). Their pirate-themed dance sequence alongside actress Marion Davies became their most enduring filmed performance.

While living in Los Angeles, the brothers became staples of the Hollywood social circuit. They regularly attended clandestine gay social gatherings and befriended notable cultural figures of the era, including Charlie Chaplin, William Haines, and Tallulah Bankhead. They were also frequent guests of media mogul William Randolph Hearst at his estate, Hearst Castle.

=== Painting and later career ===
The Rocky Twins act came to an abrupt end in 1937 when Leif collapsed on stage during a performance. He was diagnosed with an acute case of tuberculosis. Because the structural and physical appeal of the act relied strictly on the identical physical output of both twins, the duo permanently disbanded.

Following his retirement from dance, Leif turned his attention to the fine arts. During World War II, the brothers' paths diverged; while Paal eventually served in the United States Army Air Forces, Leif focused on his painting and eventually emigrated to the United States. Settling in New York City after the war, he reinvented himself as a fine artist. In 1952, he held two successful solo gallery exhibitions in Manhattan. His paintings were noted by critics for reflecting the same fluid elegance and composition that had characterized his earlier stage career.

== Personal life ==
Roschberg lived a lifestyle that openly challenged the traditional social and gender norms of the mid-20th century. He moved fluidly within the underground gay social circles of Paris, New York, and Hollywood, and was romantically linked to high-profile figures of various genders.

He was married twice, largely in keeping with the social conventions required of public figures at the time. His first marriage was to Maria Vogt in Vienna in 1939, and his second was to Jenny Voigt in Canada in 1944. Both marriages were brief and ended in divorce. Following periods of residency abroad in Sicily, Cuba, and the United States, Roschberg eventually returned to Norway. In his later years, he resided in Oslo and worked locally as a city tour guide.

== Death ==
Roschberg died in Oslo on 10 May 1967 at the age of 58. He is buried alongside his twin brother, Paal (who died in 1955), at the Vestre gravlund cemetery in Oslo.

== Filmography ==
=== Film ===
Year	Title	Role	Notes
1929	L'Argent (The Money)	Leif	Directed by Marcel L'Herbier. A high-budget French silent film that helped establish them as major stars.
1930	La Grenouille (The Frog)	Twins	A 20-minute French sound documentary/short; reportedly featured a satirical sequence about their "famous legs".
1932	Blondie of the Follies	The Rocky Twins	

== Stage and Cabaret ==
Year	Title	Venue(s)	Notes
1927	Les Ailes de Paris (Casino de Paris)	Paris, France	Professional debut; first performance of the Dolly Sisters drag parody.
1928	La Volupté de Paris (Concert Mayol)	Paris, France	Starred alongside Gina Palerme. Their Dolly Sisters impersonation became a "legendary" fixture here.
1928–29	Sie Werden Lachen (Stadt Theatre)	Vienna, Austria	Appeared in the Emil Schwarz revue.
1929	Kit Kat Club	London, UK	Part of a London tour escorted by Mistinguett.
1929	Royal Orfeum	Budapest, HU	Shared a bill with Josephine Baker.
1929	Andre Charlot's Cabaret Revue	London, UK	Performed at the Grosvenor House Hotel; featured the hit number "Guess Which is Which".
1930	Paris Miss (Casino de Paris)	Paris, France	Partners to Mistinguett; featured a "hide and seek" act involving quick-change gender transformations.
1930	Les Champs Elysées	Paris, France	Starred in a standalone cabaret show.
1931	European Tour	Various	Toured with Mistinguett across Europe.
1931	Scandinavian Tour	Stockholm, Sweden	Performed with Mona Lee; tour cut short after one twin was injured on stage.
1933–34	Ziegfeld Follies	New York, USA	Initially booked but were barred from performing due to Actors Equity rules.
1934–36	Various Cabaret Venues	New York, USA	Performed at numerous New York nightspots during the Pansy Craze.

== Legacy ==
Roschberg is recognized as a historical pioneer of queer performance art. At the height of their career, the Roschberg brothers were celebrated style icons, frequently cited by contemporary fashion journals and international socialites as being among the "best-dressed men in the world". Modern cultural historians recognize Leif and Paal Roschberg as early gay icons who utilized high-fashion drag and deliberate androgyny to challenge rigid gender roles decades before the emergence of the modern gay liberation movement.

The historical legacy of the Rocky Twins was largely recovered for modern audiences following the 2018 publication of the biography The Rocky Twins: Norway's Outrageous Jazz Age Beauties by historian Gary Chapman. Today, Roschberg is studied not merely as a novelty entertainer of the interwar period, but as an early representative of gender-fluid aesthetics in twentieth-century fashion, theater, and cinema.

== Bibliography ==
- Chapman, Gary (2018). The Rocky Twins: Norway's Outrageous Jazz Age Beauties. Edditt Publishing. ISBN 1909230286.
