= San Francisco Silent Film Festival =

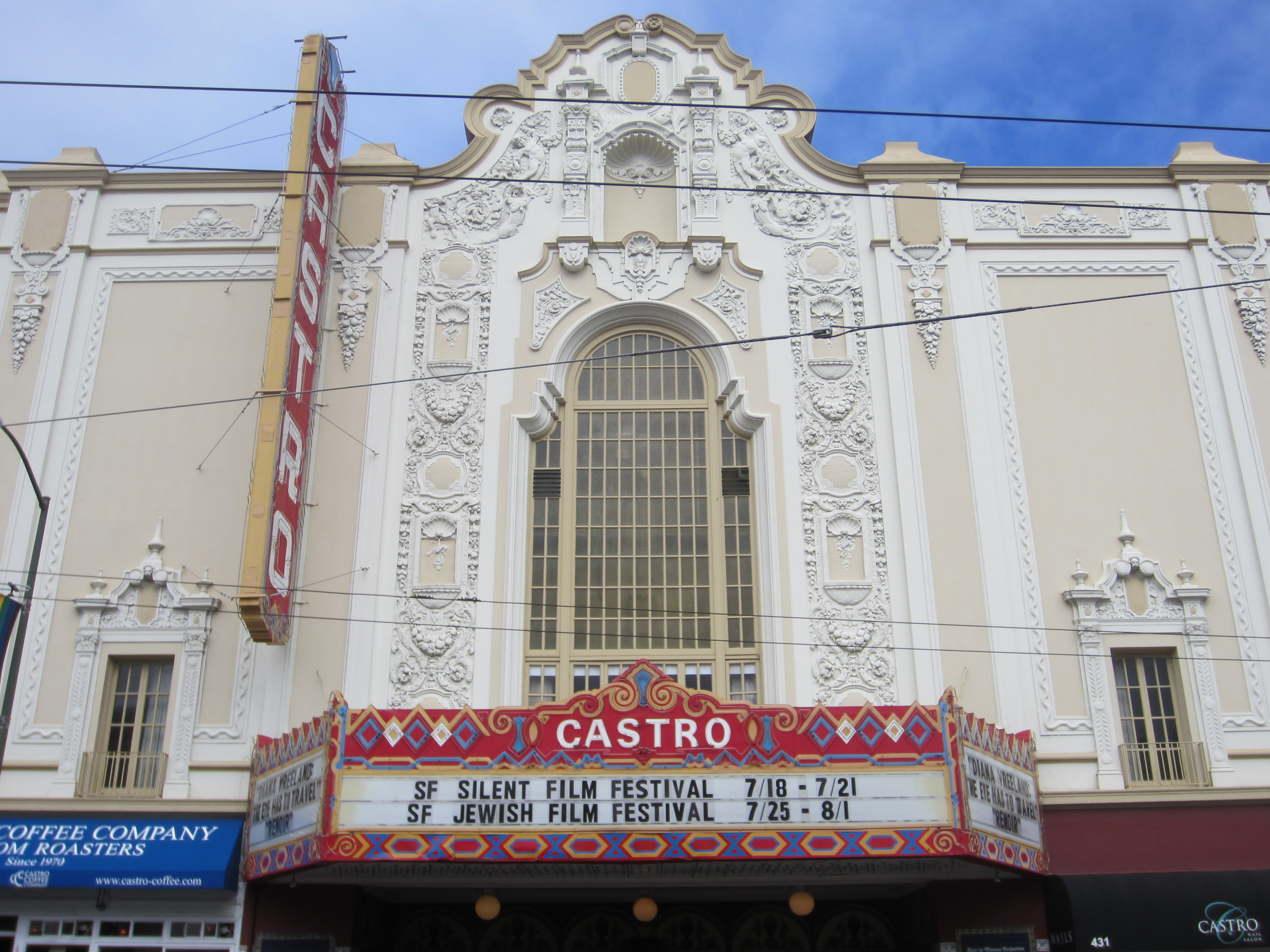
Marque of the Castro Theatre for hosting the festival in 2013

The San Francisco Silent Film Festival is a film festival first held in 1996 and presented annually at the Castro Theatre in San Francisco, California, United States. It is the largest silent film festival in the United States, although the largest silent film festival in the world remains the Giornate del cinema muto in Pordenone, northern Italy.

The 25th annual festival was held from May 5 to May 11, 2021 at the Castro Theatre in San Francisco. It has since relocated to Orinda, California.

== History ==
The 16th Annual San Francisco Silent Film Festival was held at the Castro Theatre July 14–17, 2011, featuring 18 programs of films and presentations, all with live accompaniment by the foremost silent film musicians in the world. The festival opened with the new restoration of Upstream (1927) directed by John Ford. It was brought back last year to the U.S. from the New Zealand Film Archive, where it was discovered. As part of a collaboration between the Silent Film Festival and the Headlands Center for the Arts, the Matti Bye Ensemble performed three original commissioned scores to Mauritz Stiller's The Blizzard, Herbert Ponting's The Great White Silence, and the Closing Night Film, Victor Sjöström's He Who Gets Slapped. The festival's Visiting Director was Alexander Payne.

On July 14, 2011, the Silent Film Festival announced their presentation, in association with American Zoetrope, The Film Preserve, Photoplay Productions, and British Film Institute, of Abel Gance's Napoleon in March 2012 at the Paramount Theatre Oakland. The presentation features the U.S. premiere of the complete restoration by Kevin Brownlow and the U.S. premiere of Carl Davis' orchestral score, with Davis conducting members of the Oakland East Bay Symphony. The film's famous triptych sequences was shown in full Polyvision, with three simultaneous projectors and a 70-foot screen. Napoleon had not been screened theatrically in the U.S. with a live orchestra for nearly 30 years.

In 2006, the festival added a one-day "Winter Event". On February 14, 2009, the 4th Winter Event presented the rarely seen A Kiss From Mary Pickford (1927) along with three other silent feature films. The 6th Annual Winter Event on February 12, 2011 featured the Marcel L'Herbier film L'Argent and three short films by Charlie Chaplin: The Rink, The Adventurer, and The Pawn Shop.

The Silent Film Festival includes a focus on film preservation. Each year the festival includes a free program titled "Amazing Tales From the Archives," during which film archivists screen and discuss rare and newly restored films and fragments. The festival also offers an annual Film Preservation Fellowship to a student at The L. Jeffrey Selznick School of Film Preservation, George Eastman House in Rochester, New York. The recipient of the San Francisco Silent Film Festival Preservation Fellowship works on restoring a short film from the George Eastman House Motion Picture Collection, and then screens the preserved film at the San Francisco festival.

Over the years, many people active in the film industry during the silent era, such as Fay Wray and Diana Serra Cary (a.k.a. "Baby Peggy"), have appeared in person at the Festival, in addition to those such as Sydney Chaplin whose family did. Live music is presented with each film, with pianists Stephen Horne and Donald Sosin, organist Dennis James, and the ensembles Mont Alto Motion Picture Orchestra and the Matti Bye Ensemble among the frequent performers. The advisory committee for the festival includes such noted names as Kevin Brownlow, Bruce Goldstein, Guy Maddin, Leonard Maltin, Lee Mendelson, David Shepard, Paolo Cherchi Usai, and Terry Zwigoff, as well as festival founders Melissa Chittick and Stephen Salmons. Currently, the Executive Director is Stacey Wisnia and the Artistic Director is Anita Monga.
