= Paal Roschberg =

Norwegian actor (1909–1955)

- Born: Paal Roscher Roschberg; 27 February 1909; Kristiania, Norway
- Died: 21 March 1955 (aged 46); New York, U.S.
- Other names: Paul Roschberg; Paal Rocky
- Occupations: Actor; Dancer; Writer
- Years active: 1927–1955
- Spouse: Lilian Turner (m. 1941; div. 1945)
- Relatives: Leif Roschberg (brother)

Paal Roscher Roschberg (February 27, 1909 – March 21, 1955), also known by the stage name Paal Rocky, was a Norwegian dancer, film actor, and writer. He rose to international prominence during the Jazz Age as one half of the Rocky Twins, an identical twin performing duo celebrated for their synchronized choreography, androgynous style, and high-fashion drag impersonations. Following a decade-long career across European music halls and Pre-Code Hollywood, Roschberg served as a decorated pilot during World War II. In the post-war era, he transitioned into screenwriting and acting, becoming a contributor to the Norwegian "marriage comedy" film genre before his death in New York City at the age of 46.

== Early life and education ==
Roschberg was born in Kristiania (now Oslo), Norway, into a socially prominent family. His father, Adolf Roscher Roschberg, was a colonel in the Royal Norwegian Army, while his mother was Gudrun Holst. He grew up alongside his identical twin brother, Leif, and an older brother, Gunnar, in the affluent Inkognito Terrasse neighborhood located near the Royal Palace.

Showing an early affinity for the arts, Paal and Leif co-authored and published a book of fairy tales at the age of 11. Their focus subsequently shifted to dance, and they received formal training in ballet and jazz dance under the prominent Norwegian actor and dancer Per Aabel and instructor Love Krohn. Seeking further artistic development, the twins traveled to London and Paris in their late teens to refine their technique and adopt a cosmopolitan performance style.

== Career ==
=== The Outrageous Rocky Twins (1927–1937) ===
Discovered by talent scouts in late 1927, the twins debuted at the Casino de Paris in Les Ailes de Paris and became a nightlife sensation for their synchronization and drag parodies, such as an act honoring the Dolly Sisters. Dubbed "The Black Orchids of the North," they headlined European venues like the Folies Bergère and appeared in films including L'Argent (1928). In 1932, they moved to the U.S. for Blondie of the Follies, mixing with Hollywood elites and earning acclaim for their style at Hearst Castle and socializing with Charlie Chaplin, Tallulah Bankhead, and William Haines.

=== Solo Career and German Cinema (1938–1940) ===
The partnership dissolved around 1937 due to Leif contracting an illness. Roschberg moved to Berlin as Paul Roschberg, appearing in The Stars Shine (1938). A brief 1940 return to the U.S. yielded fewer film opportunities amid shifting political landscapes.

=== Military Service ===
Enlisting in the Royal Norwegian Air Force during World War II, he trained at "Little Norway" in Canada, later served with U.S. forces, and completed occupational duty in Frankfurt. He earned multiple service medals.

=== Screenwriting and acting in Norway Cinema (1950–1955) ===
Returning to Norway as Paal Rocky, he acted in and wrote for post-war marriage comedies, penning Brudebuketten (1953) and co-writing Troll i ord (1954), alongside working on an unpublished memoir titled The Twins.

== Personal life ==
Fluent in four languages, Roschberg moved within underground queer circles in Paris and Hollywood. He married Lilian Turner in 1941; the marriage ended in post-war divorce.

== Death and mystery ==
Roschberg died in New York City on March 21, 1955, following hospitalization for injuries sustained under widely speculated circumstances involving a former partner. His remains were returned to Oslo.

== Filmography ==
=== Film ===
Year	Title	Role	Notes
1929	L'Argent (The Money)	Paul	A high-budget French silent film that helped establish them as major stars.
1930	La Grenouille (The Frog)	Twins	A 20-minute French sound documentary/short; reportedly featured a satirical sequence about their "famous legs".
1932	Blondie of the Follies	The Rocky Twins	
1938	The Stars Shine	Dancer	German film
1952	Vi vil skilles	André	
1952	Det kunne vært deg	The Doorman	
1953	Brudebuketten	Head of Department	Writer (Story and Screenplay)
1954	Portrettet	Pal	

=== Writer ===
Year	Title	Role	Notes
1953	Brudebuketten	Screenplay	He acted in it
1954	Troll i ord	Writer	Co-writer (Screenplay)

== Stage and Cabaret ==
Year	Title	Venue(s)	Notes
1927	Les Ailes de Paris (Casino de Paris)	Paris, France	Professional debut; first performance of the Dolly Sisters drag parody.
1928	La Volupté de Paris (Concert Mayol)	Paris, France	Starred alongside Gina Palerme. Their Dolly Sisters impersonation became a "legendary" fixture here.
1928–29	Sie Werden Lachen (Stadt Theatre)	Vienna, Austria	Appeared in the Emil Schwarz revue.
1929	Kit Kat Club	London, UK	Part of a London tour escorted by Mistinguett.
1929	Royal Orfeum	Budapest, HU	Shared a bill with Josephine Baker.
1929	Andre Charlot's Cabaret Revue	London, UK	Performed at the Grosvenor House Hotel; featured the hit number "Guess Which is Which".
1930	Paris Miss (Casino de Paris)	Paris, France	Partners to Mistinguett; featured a "hide and seek" act involving quick-change gender transformations.
1930	Les Champs Elysées	Paris, France	Starred in a standalone cabaret show.
1931	European Tour	Various	Toured with Mistinguett across Europe.
1931	Scandinavian Tour	Stockholm, Sweden	Performed with Mona Lee; tour cut short after one twin was injured on stage.
1933–34	Ziegfeld Follies	New York, USA	Initially booked but were barred from performing due to Actors Equity rules.
1934–36	Various Cabaret Venues	New York, USA	Performed at numerous New York nightspots during the Pansy Craze.

== Legacy ==
Today, Paal Roschberg is remembered as a pioneer of queer performance. He and his brother Leif are celebrated as early gay icons who used androgyny and drag to challenge gender roles decades before the modern Pride movement. His life is the subject of Gary Chapman's biography, The Rocky Twins: Norway's Outrageous Jazz Age Beauties, which chronicles their impact on 20th-century entertainment and queer history.

== Bibliography ==
- Chapman, Gary (2018). The Rocky Twins: Norway's Outrageous Jazz Age Beauties. Edditt Publishing. ISBN 1909230286.
