= Borghild Johannessen =

Norwegian actress, singer and dancer (1884–1972)

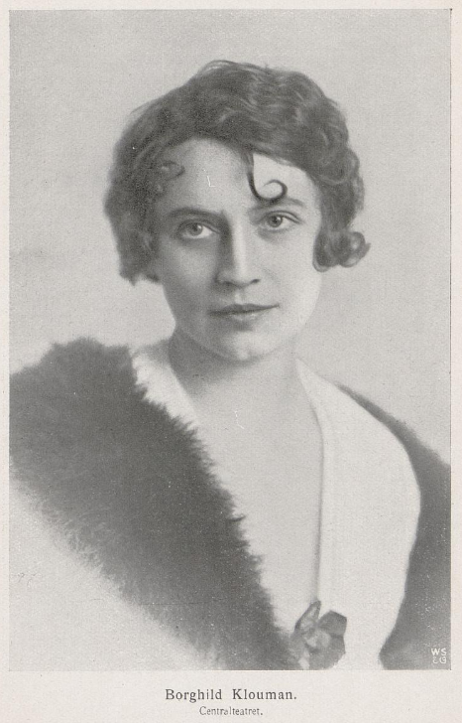
- Born: December 14, 1884; Bergen, Norway
- Died: October 14, 1972 (aged 87); Oslo, Norway
- Occupations: Actress, singer, dancer
- Spouse: Thoralf Klouman
- Children: Carsten Klouman, Wenche Klouman
- Parent: Laura Elvig (mother)
- Relatives: Svanhild Johannessen (sister)

Borghild Johannessen (December 14, 1884 – October 14, 1972) was a Norwegian actress, singer, and dancer.

== Biography ==
Johannessen was born on December 14, 1884, in Bergen, Norway, the daughter of the actors Bernt Johan Johannessen and Laura Elvig, and the sister of the actress Svanhild Johannessen. On November 29, 1915, she married actor and illustrator Thoralf Klouman, whom she worked with at the Trondheim National Theater. They were the parents of the pianist and composer Carsten Klouman and the actress Wenche Klouman.

Early in her career, Johannessen was associated with the Grønland People's Theater (Norwegian: Grønland Folketeater) and the Fahlstrøm Theater in Kristiania (now Oslo). Both of these theaters were run by Johann and Alma Fahlstrøm. After the Fahlstrøm Theater closed in 1911, she worked at the Trondheim National Theater. In January 1917, she returned to Kristiania, where she worked at the Central Theater.

While engaged with the Fahlstrøm Theater, in May 1907, Johannessen co-starred in a guest performance at the Casino Theater in Copenhagen. The same year she participated in the theater's guest performance in Stavanger. In 1909, she performed in Leo Fall's opera The Divorcée at the Fahlstrøm Theater.

Johannessen also appeared in many non-theater performances, including solo dancing in connection with a performance by her brother-in-law Hauk Aabel at the Sandefjord Spa in 1905.

== Selected roles ==
- 1905: Estrid in Lynggaard & Co. by Hjalmar Bergström (Fahlstrøm Theater)
- 1905: Aulus in Quo vadis by Stanislav Stange (Fahlstrøm Theater)
- 1906: Maja in Ett köpmanshus i skärgården by Emilie Flygare-Carlén (Grønland People's Theater)
- 1906: Edmée in La Femme de Claude by Alexandre Dumas fils (Fahlstrøm Theater)
- 1907: Fuks the Arctic fox in Paa Nordpolen 1907 by Clary Levy (Grønland People's Theater)
- 1907: Raina in Arms and the Man by George Bernard Shaw (Stavanger Theater)
- 1909: Adeline in the operetta The Divorcée by Leo Fall (Fahlstrøm Theater)
- 1910: Hélène Dumoulin in La Passerelle by Francis de Croisset and Fred de Gresac (Fahlstrøm Theater)
- 1911: Madam Salvesen in Baldevins Bryllup by Vilhelm Krag (Fahlstrøm Theater)
- 1914: Sasha in The Living Corpse by Leo Tolstoy (Trondheim National Theater)
- 1914: Sperling in Det lykkelige valg by Nils Kjær (Trondheim National Theater)
- 1915: Eliza Doolittle in Pygmalion by George Bernard Shaw (Trondheim National Theater)
- 1916: Mabel in An Ideal Husband by Oscar Wilde (Trondheim National Theater)
- 1917: Lola Cornero in Der Weg zur Hölle by Gustav Kadelburg (Central Theater)
- 1917: Martine in Kong Midas by Gunnar Heiberg (Central Theater)
- 1924: Cecily in Kinangozi by Prince Wilhelm (Central Theater)
