= Prestwich Camera =

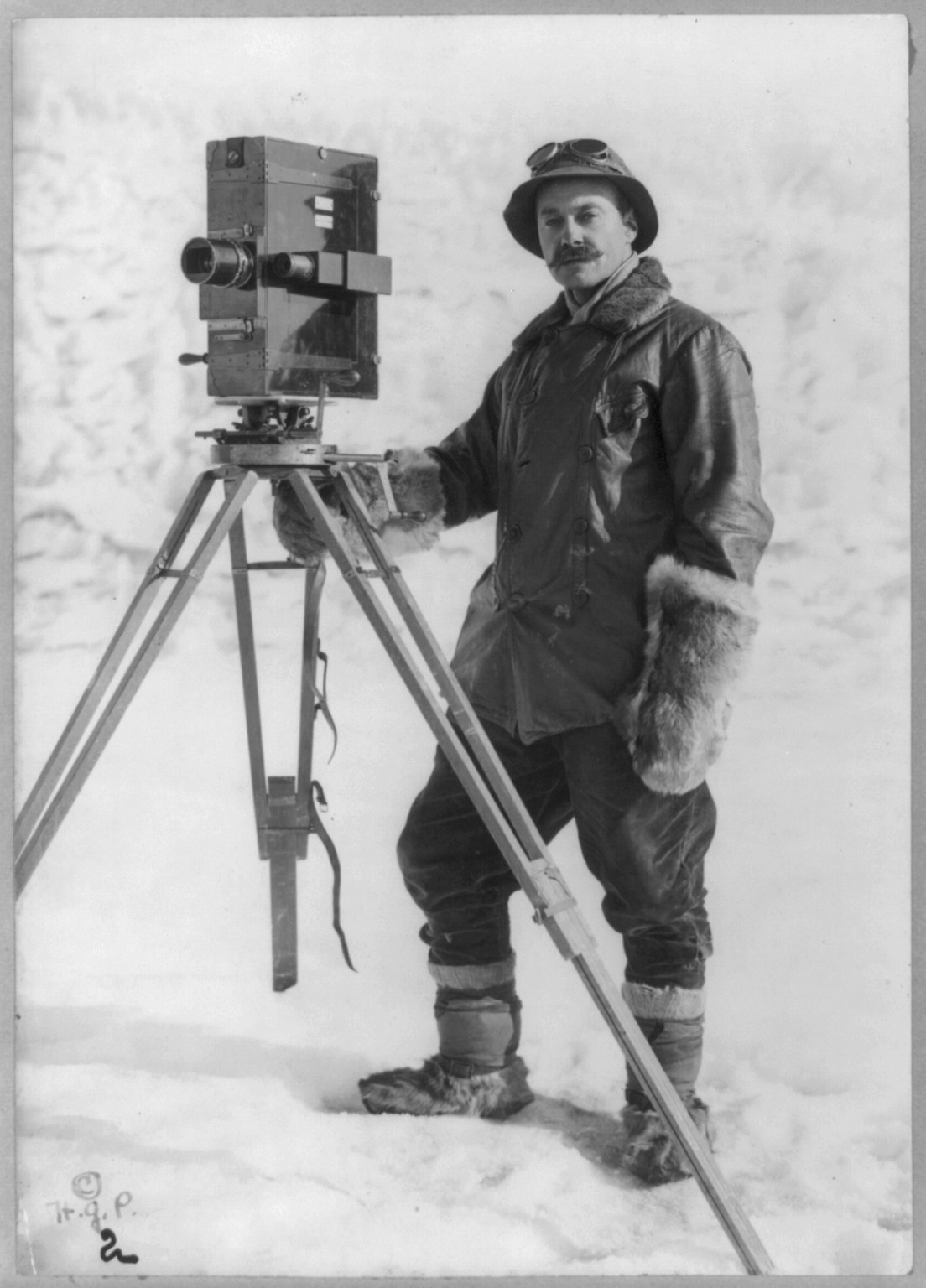
Cinematographer Herbert G. Ponting stands behind the Prestwich Model 5 Kinema Camera he used as official photographer for Robert Falcon Scott's Terra Nova Expedition (1910–1913). He incorporated some of the footage he shot into his the 1924 documentary The Great White Silence.

Prestwich Camera was a cine camera produced by the Prestwich Manufacturing Company. It was eventually fitted with external magazines capable of holding up 400 feet (120 m) of film. Several types of "Prestwich Camera" were manufactured in the late 19th century. One of the earliest designs of this type held 50 feet (15 m) of film—more film than any other camera of the age.

According to Carl Louis Gregory,

An advertisement in Hopwood's "Living Pictures" edition of 1899 offers the "Prestwich" specialties for animated photography -- "nine different models of cameras and projectors in three sizes for l/2-inch, 1 3/8-inch and 2 3/8-inch width of film."

== See also ==
History of cinema
