= Karl Ludvig Bugge =

Karl Ludvig Bugge is the name of:

- Karl Ludvig Bugge (civil servant) (1902–1981), Norwegian civil servant.
- Karl Ludvig Bugge (actor) (1915–1987), Norwegian actor, screenwriter and journalist.
