= Svanhild Johannessen =

Norwegian actress

- Born: August 21, 1882; Bergen, Norway
- Died: January 15, 1971 (aged 88); Oslo, Norway
- Occupation: Actress
- Spouse: Hauk Aabel
- Children: Per Aabel, Andreas Aabel
- Parent: Laura Elvig (mother)
- Relatives: Borghild Johannessen (sister)

Svanhild Johannessen (August 21, 1882 – January 15, 1971) was a Norwegian actress.

== Biography ==
Johannessen was born on August 21, 1882, in Bergen. She was the daughter of the actor Berent Johannessen and the actress Laura Elvig, and the sister of the actress Borghild Johannessen. On June 14, 1901, she married the actor Hauk Aabel. She was the mother of the actors Per Aabel and Andreas Aabel.

Johannessen had her stage debut on January 4, 1900 at the Central Theater under the direction of Rudolf "Rulle" Rasmussen. She played the role of the young girl Hildegard in the comedy Das Opferlamm (The Sacrificial Lamb) by Oscar Walther and Leo Stein, in which her father played the lead role.

In 1900, Johannessen participated in the Nord-Norge-turneen (Northern Norway Tour), headed by Harald Otto, in which she played Helga in Bjørnstjerne Bjørnson's comedy Geografi og Kærlighed (Geography and Love).

== Selected roles ==
- Hildegard in Das Opferlamm by Oscar Walther and Leo Stein (Central Theater, 1900)
- An ingénue in Le Voyage en Chine by Alfred Delacour and Eugène Marin Labiche (Central Theater, 1900)
- Helga in Geografi og Kærlighed by Bjørnstjerne Bjørnson (Northern Norway Tour, 1900)
