= Brudebuketten =

- Directed by: Bjørn Breigutu
- Written by: Bjørn Breigutu; Paal Roschberg
- Starring: Randi Kolstad; Lalla Carlsen; Per Aabel; Lauritz Falk; Jørn Ording; Wenche Foss; Kari Diesen; Fridtjof Mjøen; Aud Schønemann; Eva Steen; Paal Roschberg
- Release date: 26 December 1953
- Running time: 92 minutes
- Country: Norway
- Language: Norwegian

Brudebuketten (English: The Bridal Bouquet) is a 1953 Norwegian comedy film directed by Bjørn Breigutu, starring Randi Kolstad, Lalla Carlsen and Per Aabel.

== Cast ==
- Randi Kolstad as Siv Blom
- Lalla Carlsen as Berthe
- Per Aabel as Høyland jr.
- Lauritz Falk as Victor Wahlin
- Jørn Ording as Picasso, artist
- Wenche Foss as a bard
- Kari Diesen as bathing guest
- Fridtjof Mjøen as psychiatrist
- Aud Schønemann as Mirakel, housekeeper
- Sigrun Otto as a dutiful mother
- Paal Roschberg as head of department
- Guri Stormoen as hostess
- Anne Lise Wang as mannequin
- Jon Sund as hotel porter
- Arne Bang-Hansen as the Stockholm traveler
- Britta Lech-Hanssen as The Stockholm Farmer's Wife
- Eva Steen as lady in the shop
- Leif Omdal as an art dealer
- Lillemor Grimsgaard as a lady
- Topsy Håkansson as a mannequin
- Greta Syrdahl as an art-loving lady
- Turid Balke as secretary
- Svein Byhring as messenger
