= Blondie of the Follies =

1932 film

- Theatrical poster
- Directed by: Edmund Goulding
- Written by: Anita Loos; Frances Marion
- Produced by: Marion Davies
- Starring: Marion Davies; Robert Montgomery; Billie Dove; Jimmy Durante
- Cinematography: George Barnes
- Edited by: George Hively
- Music by: William Axt
- Distributed by: Metro-Goldwyn-Mayer
- Release date: September 1, 1932
- Running time: 91 minutes
- Country: United States
- Language: English
- Budget: $603,000

Blondie of the Follies is a 1932 American pre-Code comedy film directed by Edmund Goulding and written by Anita Loos and Frances Marion.

== Plot ==
In a crowded New York tenement on the upper east side, Blondie and Lottie are neighbors and best friends. Lottie joins the Follies, a burlesque show, escaping their noisy, crowded, poverty-stricken life with a Mr. Kinskey. Blondie's father comes home exhausted from searching for a job. Blondie is worried, the doctor has warned him to be careful.

Lottie, now a great success in burlesque, has changed her name to Lurline and is kept by the wealthy Larry Belmont. Blondie visits Lurline's Park Avenue apartment, where Larry takes a fancy to her, as does his older friend, Murchenson. Larry invites Blondie to the Follies that night and gets her into the show.

They go to the nearby speakeasy, While they are dancing, he propositions her, and she rebuffs him. He backs off, and by the time he drives her home in the morning she is merrily intoxicated and he realizes there is something special about her. The whole family has been in a state, wondering where she is. Her father is furious, and makes her choose between promising never to see Larry again and getting out. She leaves home and goes to Lottie's. Too naive to understand the whole situation, she confesses her attraction to Larry and is bewildered when the revelation shatters Lottie.

The next day, Blondie's father comes to Lottie's apartment and tells Blondie he has “finished being an old-time Pa.” When she tells him she is going into the Follies, he is very worried but kisses her and wishes her luck. Blondie promises Lottie to keep “hands off” Larry.

Lottie brings Blondie to a party on board Murchenson's yacht. Larry accuses her of procuring her friend for Murchenson. He says Blondie does not understand this party—and the lifestyle it represents. He tells Lottie that they are through: He has “made arrangements” for her financial welfare. He tries to convince Blondie that his feelings for her are different. Lottie cannot let go of her jealousy and forces Blondie to admit that she “might” care for Larry. In reaction Blondie throws herself at Murcheson.

Three months later, Blondie invites Larry to tea at her apartment. He congratulates her on her success in “the bigger life”. Lottie arrives; Blondie tries to bring them together, but it does not go well. Larry never loved Lottie; he leaves. The girlfriends talk. Murchenson wants to marry Blondie, but she will only marry for love.

Blondie throws a wild party full of her Follies friends, including Jimmy Durante, who does a comic turn on the film Grand Hotel, with Blondie as Garbo. Then Blondie gets a phone call and rushes away from the chaos to go to a warehouse where her father has collapsed from a heart attack. He dies moments after she arrives.

One night, while the show is running, Larry sends a messenger to tell Blondie to meet him at the speakeasy. He is leaving for Europe. Lottie intercepts the message and goes over first, in costume, AWOL from the performance. When Blondie arrives, Larry tells her he loves her and is going away. Lottie flies at her, and the two women carry their argument onto the stage. When Lottie lets go of her hand during a crack the whip production number, Blondie is thrown into the orchestra pit. The show goes on. Frantic, Lottie forces her way into the ambulance with her friend.

We next see Blondie on crutches in her crowded apartment, laughing hysterically and calling for champagne. The party is to celebrate her move back home. Murchenson still wants her, but as far as she is concerned, he is “finished”. Larry appears and tells her that her place is with him. She refuses to consider it: The doctors have no hope for her damaged leg. Sometime later, in the middle of the night, Larry bangs on the door of the flat. He has a group of specialists with him who can cure her. They think she is his wife. She is not. “But you will be, won't you?” he asks, and she sobs, “Okay...”

== Cast ==
- Marion Davies as Blondie McClune
- Robert Montgomery as Larry Belmont
- Billie Dove as Lottie Callahan / Lurline Cavanaugh
- Jimmy Durante as Jimmy
- James Gleason as Pop McClune
- ZaSu Pitts as Gertie
- Sidney Toler as Pete
- Douglass Dumbrille as Murchenson
- Sarah Padden as Ma McClune
- Louise Carter as Ma Callahan
- Clyde Cook as Dancer
- Paal Roschberg as The Rocky Twins
- Leif Roschberg as The Rocky Twins
