= Karl Ludvig Bugge (actor) =

Norwegian actor, screenwriter, and journalist

Karl Ludvig Erlingsøn Bugge (1 September 1915 – 1987) was a Norwegian actor, screenwriter and journalist.

He attended Frogner School and was russ president here in 1934. In 1941 he wrote a play for Centralteatret, Fortunas sønn Peter, in which he also played a small part. After the Second World War he combined a journalist job in Morgenbladet with jobs as an actor and stagewriter at Centralteatret. His last play, Det kunne ha vært deg was staged at over 150 locations in the Nordic countries. It was also made into a 1952 comedy film. He acted in the 1955 film Bedre enn sitt rykte.

From the 1950s he wrote in Aftenposten, using the pen name "Tittern". He was also press secretary for Nationaltheatret for five years and steward in the gentlemen's club Det Norske Selskab for twenty years. His last book was 1978's Bekkimellom, a nature depiction.

Bugge was married to the actress Wenche Klouman. He died in 1987 at age 72.
