= Det kunne vært deg =

- Directed by: Kåre Bergstrøm; Henki Kolstad
- Written by: Karl Ludvig Bugge
- Starring: Inger Marie Andersen; Henki Kolstad; Wenche Foss
- Edited by: Olav Engebretsen
- Release date: 13 November 1952
- Running time: 94 minutes
- Country: Norway
- Language: Norwegian

Det kunne vært deg (Norwegian: It Could Have Been You) is a 1952 Norwegian comedy-drama film. Directed by Kåre Bergstrøm and Henki Kolstad, it is based on the stage play of the same name by Karl-Ludvig Bugge, who also wrote the screenplay, starring Inger Marie Andersen, Henki Kolstad and Wenche Foss.

Upon its release, the film was hailed as a major success, with some contemporary critics calling it the "funniest film made in Norway" at that time.

== Plot ==
The story follows Maisen (Inger Marie Andersen) and the architect Harald "Pompen" (Henki Kolstad), a newly married couple. On their way home to their new apartment, Harald loses the flat key. They are forced to seek help from their neighbor, Cornelius (Ebbe Rode), a lifelong bachelor who frequently has different women over. As Maisen and Harald's marriage begins to falter due to misunderstandings and past "summer adventures," Cornelius becomes a central figure in trying to help them navigate their relationship.

== Cast ==
- Inger Marie Andersen as Maisen
- Henki Kolstad as Harald "Pompen"
- Wenche Foss as Ingrid
- Ebbe Rode as Cornelius
- Jack Fjeldstad as Bileieren
- Paal Roschberg as The Doorman
- Nora Brockstedt as Syngende Dame

== Reception ==
The film was highly praised for its script and performances. Reviewers particularly noted Wenche Foss's "impressive" performance and Bugge's "unusually promising" screenwriting. In Denmark, the film was released under the title Vore små fejltrin.
