= The Great White Silence =

1924 film

- The full film
- Directed by: Herbert Ponting
- Produced by: Herbert Ponting
- Starring: Robert Falcon Scott
- Cinematography: Herbert Ponting
- Music by: Simon Fisher Turner (re-release)
- Production company: British Film Institute (re-release)
- Release dates: 1924; 2011 (restoration re-released)
- Running time: 108 minutes
- Country: United Kingdom

The Great White Silence is a 1924 English documentary that contains brief cinematograph sequences taken during the Terra Nova Expedition of 1910–1913. The principal filmmaker was photographer Herbert Ponting. Originally a silent film, the documentary was restored and re-released in 2011 by the British Film Institute with a musical soundtrack by Simon Fisher Turner.

== Synopsis and production notes ==
The Terra Nova Expedition was an effort, by governments and concerned citizens of what was then the British Empire, to plant the Union Jack on the South Pole by means of men, ponies, dogs, and primitive snowmobiles hauling sledges from a base located on the Antarctic coastline. The documentary portrays expedition leader Robert Falcon Scott and his ship, the Terra Nova, and men as they leave Lyttelton, New Zealand, to sail into the Southern Ocean and its ice floes.

Safely landed on the icy coastline of Ross Island, the filmmaker follows the men as they set up tents, practice skiing, and prepare to probe southward toward the Pole. The film concludes with a sequence of the explorers pushing off from their base, and title cards reminding viewers of what, to the 1924 viewer, would have been the familiar story of the expedition's tragic conclusion. Scott and his immediate support group of four companions never returned from the Pole.

=== Pioneering cinematographer ===
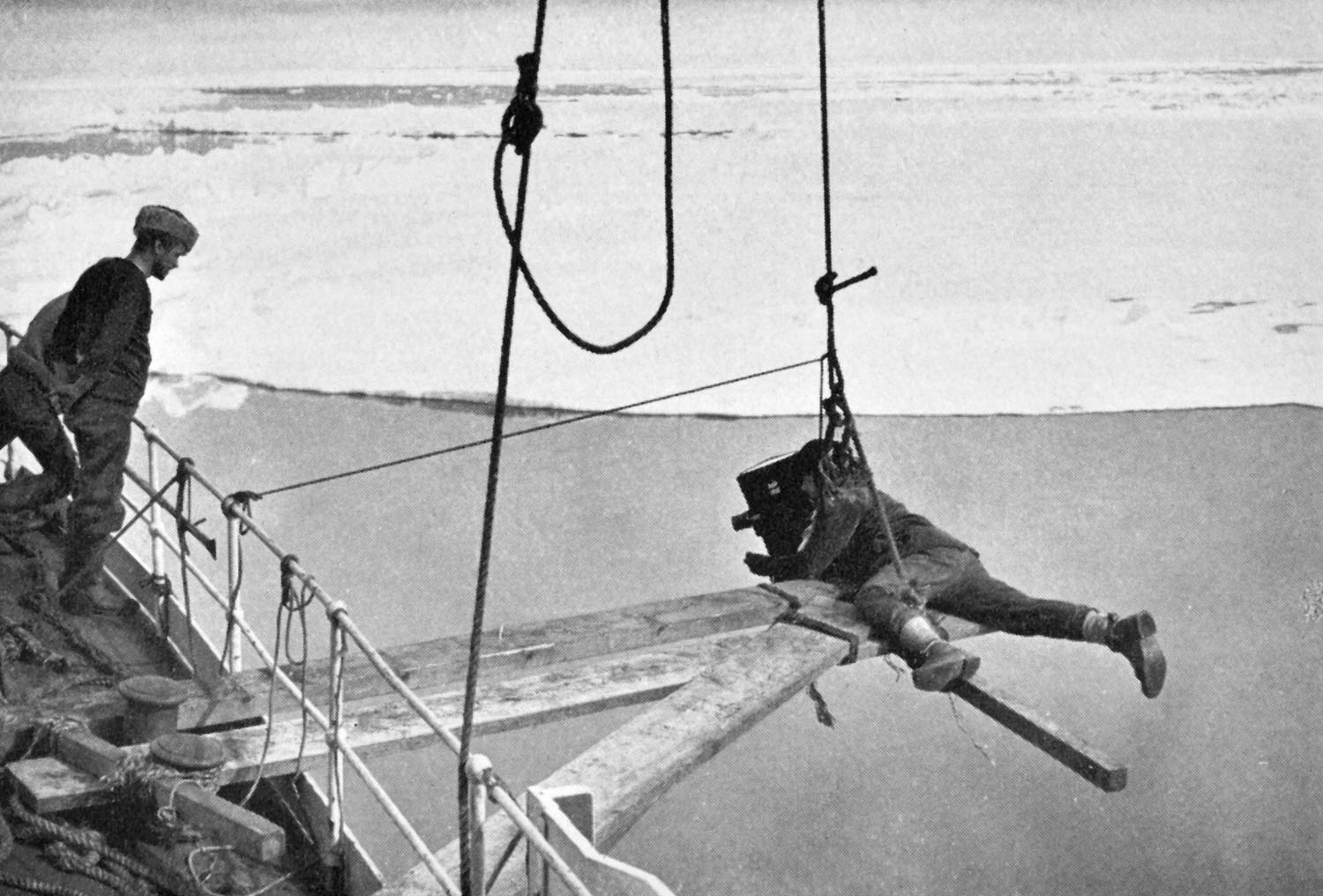
Ponting spread-eagled on a platform rigged to enable him to secure footage of the bow of the Terra Nova cleaving the ice-floes (December 1910)

Filmmaker Herbert Ponting was the first known photographer to bring a cinematograph to the Antarctic continent and to take brief film sequences of the continent's killer whales, Adélie penguins, south polar skuas, Weddell seals and other fauna, as well as the human explorers and scientists.

Scott did not choose cinematographer Ponting to accompany him to the South Pole. Ponting remained on base and survived with his film and photographs, eventually returning to England.

== Reception ==
The Great White Silence, and a successor film with a soundtrack based upon some of the same film sequences, 90° South, were not great commercial successes, and Ponting, the director, died impoverished. However, his work was eventually acclaimed as one of the highest-quality group of images surviving from the so-called Heroic Age of Antarctic Exploration, and The Great White Silence was unearthed, restored, and re-released in 2011.

Reviews of the re-release were significantly positive. Marc Lee of The Daily Telegraph called the film "deeply moving" and "startlingly powerful". Cath Clarke of The Guardian gave the film four stars out of five and lauded the "beautiful" restoration work done by the BFI. Sean Axmaker of the Seattle Post-Intelligencer, reporting from the San Francisco Silent Film Festival, gave the film a glowing review. "An impressive documentary and a riveting document", he praised the "beautiful still photographs", "eloquent" titles and Ponting's "slow build of trials, disasters and deaths" for being "respectful and affecting". He also noted that "what is unexpectedly impressive is Ponting’s superb storytelling, especially of an event he was unable to photograph", Scott's journey to the pole.
