= Andreas Aabel =

Norwegian actor and translator (1911–1948)

- Born: February 21, 1911; Kristiania (now Oslo), Norway
- Died: December 29, 1948 (aged 37); Oslo, Norway
- Occupation: Actor
- Parents: Hauk Aabel (father); Svanhild Johannessen (mother)
- Relatives: Per Aabel

Andreas Aabel (February 21, 1911 – December 29, 1948) was a Norwegian actor and translator.

== Family ==
Andreas Aabel was the son of the actor Hauk Aabel and the actress Svanhild Johannessen, and the brother of the actor Per Aabel. He was the grandson of the physician and poet Andreas Leigh Aabel. He married Ellen Johanne Didriksen (1911–2001) in 1936.

== Career ==
Aabel made his theater debut at the Central Theater in 1930. He appeared in five films between 1932 and 1948. Aabel died of a throat infection in 1948.

== Filmography ==
- 1932: Prinsessen som ingen kunne målbinde as Askeladd
- 1933: Jeppe på bjerget as the cobbler's apprentice
- 1938: Bør Børson Jr. as O. G. Hansen
- 1946: Et spøkelse forelsker seg as Fidias
- 1948: Kampen om tungtvannet as Kasper Idland
