= L'Argent (1928 film) =

1928 film directed by Marcel L'Herbier

- French theatrical release poster
- Directed by: Marcel L'Herbier
- Screenplay by: Marcel L'Herbier; Arthur Bernède
- Based on: L'Argent by Émile Zola
- Produced by: Cinégraphic; Société des Cinéromans
- Starring: Pierre Alcover; Brigitte Helm; Mary Glory; Alfred Abel
- Cinematography: Jules Kruger
- Distributed by: Société des Cinéromans (France); Universum Film AG (Germany)
- Release date: 9 January 1929
- Running time: 200 minutes (original cut); 168 minutes (theatrical cut)
- Country: France
- Languages: Silent film; French intertitles
- Budget: FF 5,000,000

L'Argent (1928) by Marcel L'Herbier

L'Argent ("money") is a French silent film directed in 1928 by Marcel L'Herbier. The film was adapted from the 1891 novel L'Argent by Émile Zola, and it portrays the world of banking and the stock market in Paris in the 1920s.

== Background ==
Marcel L'Herbier had become one of the most prominent French film-makers during the 1920s, but even after he had sought greater creative independence by establishing his own production company, Cinégraphic, he experienced continual frustration over the financial arrangements under which he had to work. He said that after ten years of making films, he became "obsessed by a single idea: to film at any cost, even (what a paradox) at great cost, a fierce denunciation of money".

He chose as the basis of his story Zola's novel L'Argent about the corrupting power of money throughout society, but he insisted that it should be updated from the 1860s to present-day Paris. He envisaged a film on a large scale (having been impressed by Abel Gance's Napoléon) and set about arranging a budget of 3 million francs (the eventual cost was nearly 5 million.). To achieve this he had to put his own company in partnership with the Société des Cinéromans of Jean Sapène, and also agreed a distribution deal with the German company UFA which resulted in the engagement of two German stars among the cast.

== Synopsis ==
Saccard and Gunderman are rival Paris bankers. Saccard sees an opportunity to rescue his failing bank, Banque Universelle, by financing the solo transatlantic flight of Jacques Hamelin, a pioneering aviator. Saccard intends to capitalise on his popularity to set up a colonial business project in Guyane and to seduce Hamelin's wife Line in his absence. When a rumour circulates that Hamelin has crashed, Saccard exploits the false reports to manipulate shares at the Bourse. Gunderman disapproves of Saccard and his methods and has secretly bought shares in his bank to use as a weapon. Baroness Sandorf, a former lover of Saccard, acts as a spy to assist Gunderman's interests and advance her own.

Hamelin's work in Guyane becomes an expensive liability and his failing eyesight prevents him from keeping adequate control of the accounts. Saccard ensnares the naïve Line in mounting debts which compel her to tolerate his attentions. Incited by Sandorf, Line makes a formal complaint about Saccard's financial dealings, which leads to an enquiry. When Line discovers how her husband's reputation has been compromised by Saccard, she tries to shoot him at a party. Sandorf restrains her, fearful for her investments if Saccard were to die. Gunderman sells his shares in Saccard's bank and precipitates its collapse. Saccard is arrested along with Hamelin, who has returned to France. Saccard's duplicity is exposed in court and through Gunderman's intervention Hamelin is released. Saccard goes to prison but wastes no time before planning new financial schemes with the aid of his gaoler.

== Cast ==
- Pierre Alcover as the banker Saccard
- Brigitte Helm as the scheming Baroness Sandorf
- Henry Victor as the idealistic aviator Jacques Hamelin
- Marie Glory (as Mary Glory) as Hamelin's naïve and fragile wife Line
- Alfred Abel as the coolly calculating banker Gunderman
- Antonin Artaud as Saccard's secretary M. Mazaud
- Jules Berry as the Hamelins' urbane journalist friend Huret
- Yvette Guilbert as La Méchain, an opportunistic investor on the Bourse
- Raymond Rouleau as Jantrou
- Paal Roschberg as Les Rocky Twins, a dancer
- Leif Roschberg as Les Rocky Twins, a dancer

== Production ==
L'Herbier's decision to update Zola's story to the present-day met with strong criticism even before filming began. The theatre and film director André Antoine published a newspaper article denouncing such a betrayal of Zola's depiction of society in the Second Empire and arguing that it was unacceptable to treat a classic work of literature in this way. L'Herbier delivered a robust reply, pointing out the long history of literary transpositions and arguing that to treat Zola's novel as a period piece would be to betray the passion of its theme.

Filming began in spring 1928 and continued until the autumn. At the Joinville Studios, art directors André Barsacq and Lazare Meerson constructed several monumental sets for key scenes: the grand interiors of the respective banks of Saccard and Gunderman, the Hamelins' apartment with its view over the skyline of Paris, the baroness Sandorf's mansion with its split-level gaming room, and for Saccard's party the massive room in his house with one wall consisting of organ-pipes and a central pool and fountains with a bridge providing a stage for the entertainers. Other scenes required location shooting with large numbers of extras. The departure of Hamelin's transatlantic flight was filmed at Le Bourget airport. For three days over the weekend of Pentecost L'Herbier was allowed to take over the Paris Bourse and employed 2000 extras in the stock-exchange scenes. Still more challenging was a night-time scene in the Place de l'Opéra which had to be specially lit and filled with people to convey the feverish excitement of waiting for news of Hamelin's flight.

For his principal cameraman L'Herbier chose Jules Kruger who had devised the elaborate camerawork of Gance's Napoléon. Within the huge spaces of the sets they employed unusually active movements for the camera whose virtuosity makes them highly visible to the spectator. At Saccard's party the camera glides back and forth above the guests; in the bank scenes it moves alongside and among the crowds. Most strikingly of all, in the scenes at the Bourse, a vertical shot from the high ceiling down to the "corbeille" (dealers' enclosure) makes the scene resemble the teeming activity of ants; and an automatic camera then creates a dizzying effect as it spirals down towards the floor. The result is a sense of dynamic exploration of the spaces contrasting with the monumental appearance of the sets.

Another innovation that L'Herbier employed for the first screening of the film was the use of recorded sound effects. For the scenes of Hamelin's take-off at the airfield, which is intercut with scenes of frantic activity at the Bourse, authentic recordings were made in both settings and then a composite blend of them was played back from records in the cinema. It was perhaps symbolic that only seventeen days after the première of L'Argent this genuinely experimental use of integrated sound was superseded by the first showing in Paris of the first American sound film, The Jazz Singer.

L'Herbier's original cut of the film, which was shown to the press in December 1928, ran for about 200 minutes. During the latter stages of production, his relationship with Jean Sapène, his co-producer, had virtually broken down, and to his dismay he found that at the first public showing in Paris in January 1929, the film had been re-edited in places on Sapène's instructions and was now more than 30 minutes shorter. Although L'Herbier took the dispute to arbitration and was subsequently able to restore some of the missing material, on its initial release the film was seen only in the truncated version. A reconstructed shot-for-shot screenplay of the original version was published in 1978.

== Reception ==
On its release the film seems to have had some commercial success, particularly in Germany. Its reception among critics was more mixed, as some regarded it as a visual triumph while others found scant justification in the story for the indulgence in spectacular sets and energetic camerawork. In the 1970s, however, a detailed study by Noël Burch, in which he argued that L'Argent was a ground-breaking work and one of the cinema's greatest achievements, launched a re-evaluation of the film. As a result, Marcel L'Herbier's own assessment that this was the summit of his silent career, has found wider endorsement.

== Autour de L'Argent ==
L'Herbier arranged with Jean Dréville, then a 22-year-old journalist and amateur photographer, that he should make a simultaneous documentary about the filming of L'Argent. The resulting film, entitled Autour de L'Argent (1928), was itself a vigorous exercise in poetic montage, capturing the atmosphere and sheer scale of the sets from the points of view of the lighting riggers, the cameramen and the extras. It shows L'Herbier meticulously directing his actors and marshalling the crowds of extras. It also reveals how the intricate camera movements were achieved with ground-level trolleys, floating platforms and a free-swinging camera suspended from the roof. The film, which runs for about 40 minutes, was originally silent, but in 1971 a soundtrack was added with commentary spoken by Dréville.
