= Thoralf Klouman =

Norwegian satirical illustrator and actor

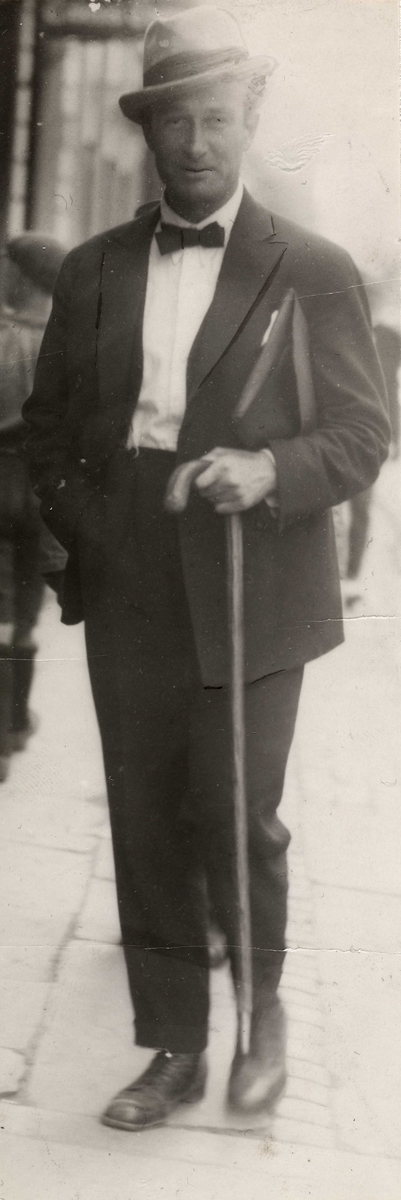
- Klouman ca. 1930
- Born: 26 April 1890; Innvik, Norway
- Died: 17 May 1940 (aged 50); Oslo
- Occupations: actor and satirical illustrator

Thoralf Klouman (26 April 1890 – 17 May 1940) was a Norwegian satirical illustrator and actor.

== Personal life ==
Thoralf Klouman was born in the village of Innvik in the district of Nordfjord as the son of physician Hans Henrik Gerhard Klouman and Regina Augusta Emilie Uchermann. His father died when Thoralf was two years old, and the family then moved to Kristiania. He was married to actress Borghild Johannessen, and was a brother-in-law of actor Hauk Aabel. He was the father of the actress Wenche Klouman.

== Career ==
Klouman made his stage debut in 1908 at Fahlstrøms Theater in Kristiania, in Rubens' and Hurgon's musical comedy Miss Hook of Holland. He toured with Det Nye Teater, and was appointed at Trondhjems Nationale Scene in 1911. From 1916 to 1931, he played at Centralteatret, from 1931 to 1936, he was at Det Nye Teater, and later at the Carl Johan Theater. He participated in films, such as To levende og en død from 1937. He wrote a comedy for children, Drømmen til Radioland og dit pepperen gror, which was staged at Nationaltheatret in 1925.

Klouman studied drawing at the Academy of Arts in Kristiania in 1914. He delivered satirical illustrations to the newspapers Dagbladet, Tidens Tegn and Aftenposten. Selected illustrations were issued in the collections Ondskap from 1912, Karikaturer from 1917, Tidens tegner from 1922 and Kloumans karikaturer from 1925. More than sixty of his caricatures are used in Rønneberg's monography on the first fifty years of Nationaltheatret. He was among the pioneers of animation film in Norway, and produced the animation film Admiral Palads in 1917, about the American president Woodrow Wilson.

Klouman died in Oslo on 17 May 1940, at the age of 50.

== Selected filmography ==
- Song of Rondane (1934)
- To levende og en død (1937)
