= Komediehuset på Engen =

Norwegian theatre building (1800-1909)

Coordinates: 60°23′30″N 5°19′04″E

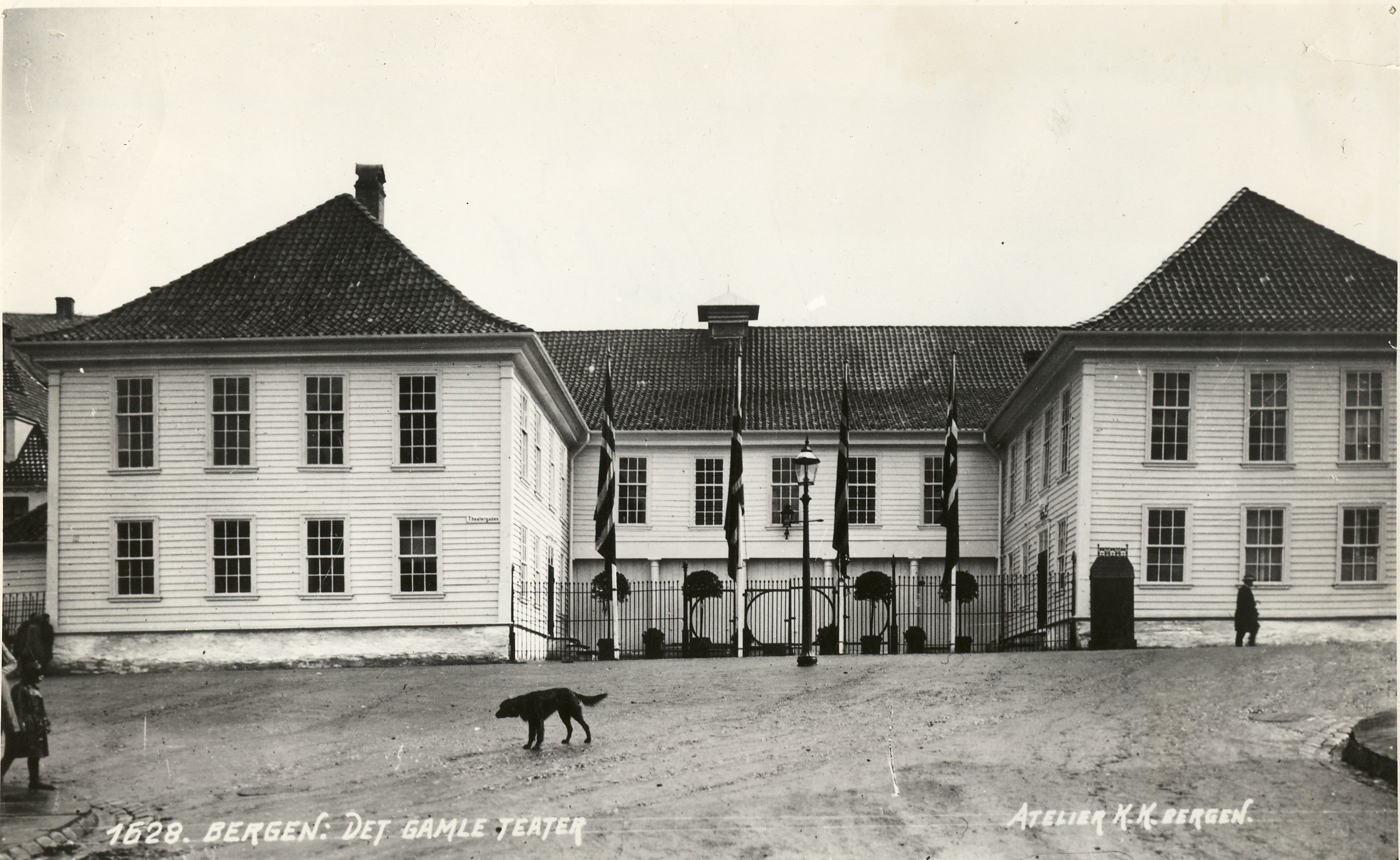
Komediehuset på Engen.

Komediehuset på Engen ('Meadow Comedy House') was a historic theatre in Bergen in Norway, active between 1800 and 1909. It was the likely first theatre building in Norway. It housed the Det dramatiske Selskab of Bergen (1800-28), travelling theatre companies (1828-50), the Det norske Theater (Bergen) (1850-63) and Den Nationale Scene (1876-1909), and was finally a concert house and theater museum until it was destroyed in a British bomb raid in 1944.
