= Herbert Ponting =

English explorer and photographer (1870–1935)

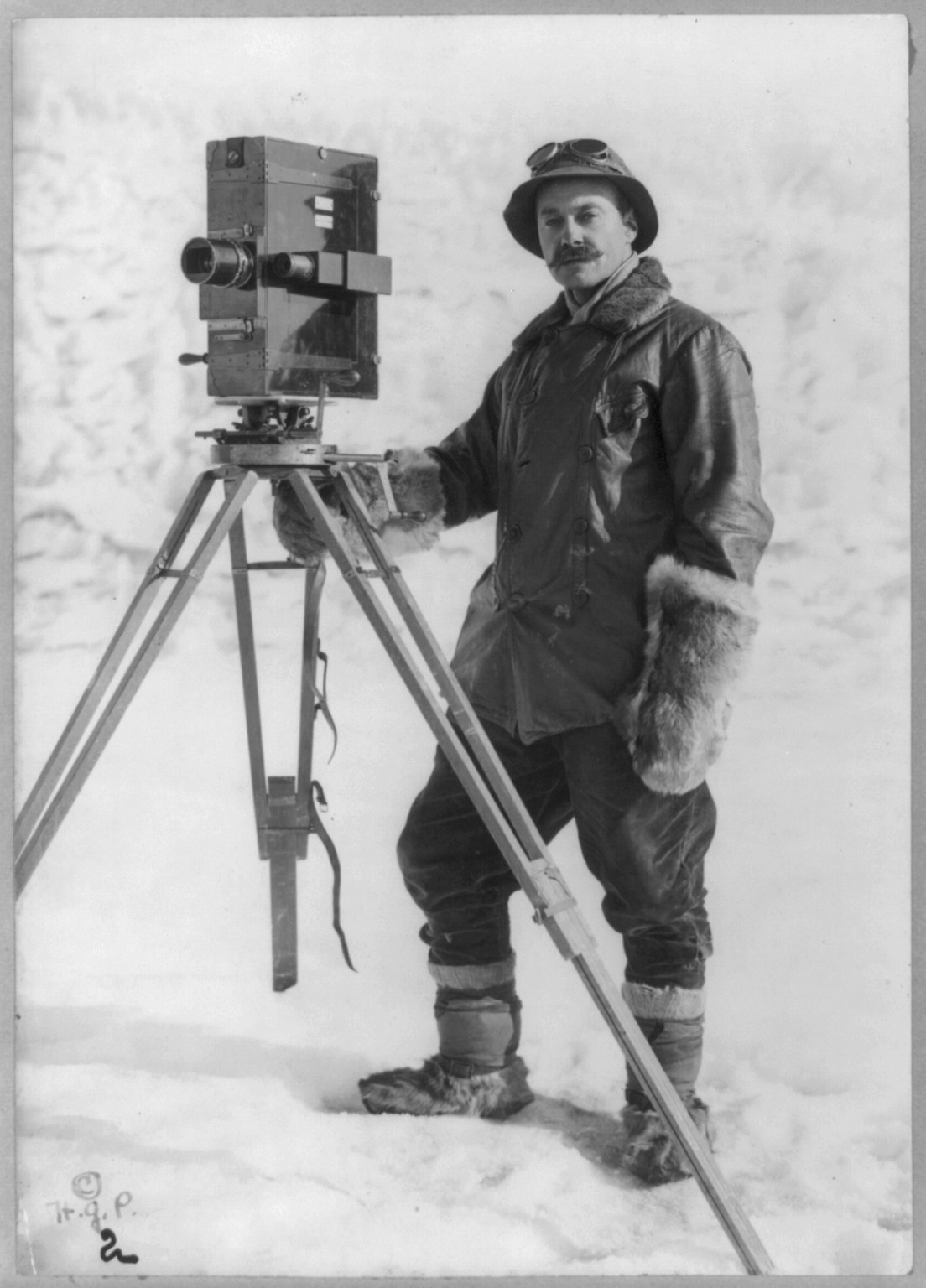
- Ponting in Antarctica with his Prestwich motion picture camera (1911)
- Born: Herbert George Ponting; 21 March 1870; Salisbury, England
- Died: 7 February 1935 (aged 64); London, England
- Education: Preston Grammar School
- Occupations: Photographer, cinematographer

Herbert George Ponting, FRGS (21 March 1870 – 7 February 1935) was an English professional photographer. He is best known as the expedition photographer and cinematographer for Robert Falcon Scott's Terra Nova Expedition to the Ross Sea and South Pole (1910–1913). In this role, he captured some of the most enduring images of the Heroic Age of Antarctic Exploration.

== Early life ==
Ponting was born in Salisbury, Wiltshire in the south of England, on 21 March 1870. His father was a successful banker, Francis Ponting, and his mother was Mary Sydenham. From the age of eighteen Herbert was employed at a local bank branch in Liverpool, where he stayed for three years. That time was long enough to convince him that he did not wish to follow in the profession of his father. He emigrated to California where he ran a fruit ranch and worked in mining. In 1895 he married a California woman, Mary Biddle Elliott; their daughter Mildred, was born in Auburn, California in January 1897 and their son Arthur was born in London, England in March 1899.

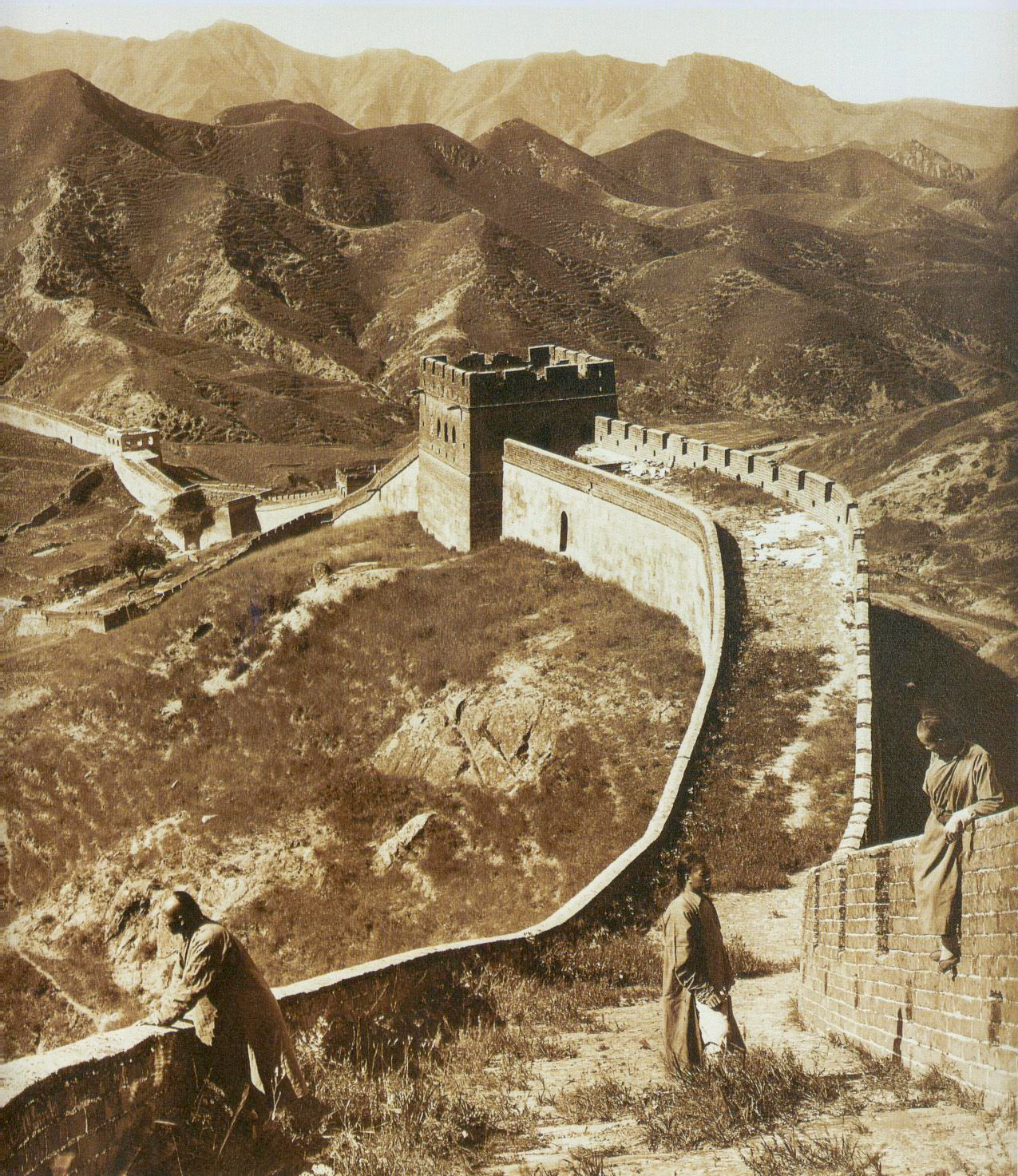
The Great Wall of China in 1907, photographed by Herbert Ponting.

Ponting sold his fruit farm in 1898 and, with his wife and daughter, returned to Britain to stay with his family. When they returned to the USA he turned his long-standing hobby of photography into his next career. Following a chance meeting with a professional photographer in California, to whom he had given advice about the locality and showed his own photos, he entered his pictures in competitions and won awards; he also sent some of his stereoscopic photographs to companies who published them. His work was also selected for the first San Francisco Salon; at that time he was living in Sausalito, north of San Francisco. He took stereoviews of and reported on the Russo-Japanese War of 1904–05, and worked in Asia, including in Burma, Korea, Java, China and India taking stereoviews and working as a freelance photographer for English-speaking periodicals. Improvements in the printing press had made it possible, for the first time, for mass-market magazines to print and publish photographic illustrations.

In 1907 Ponting returned to Europe, where he exhibited his Japanese and other photographs and continued to take stereoviews (including in Switzerland and Spain) and wrote illustrated articles for magazines including Country Life, The Graphic, the Illustrated London News, Pearson's, and the Strand Magazine.

Ponting expanded his photographs of Japan into a 1910 book, In Lotus-land Japan. He took extensive photographs in Spain. He had been elected a Fellow of the Royal Geographical Society (FRGS) in 1905. His flair for journalism and ability to shape his photographic illustrations into a narrative led to his being signed as expedition photographer aboard the Terra Nova, the first time a professional photographer was included on an Antarctic expedition.

== The Terra Nova and Antarctica ==
As a member of the shore party in early 1911, Ponting helped set up the Terra Nova Expedition's Antarctic winter camp at Cape Evans, Ross Island. The camp included a tiny photographic darkroom. Although the expedition came more than 20 years after the invention of photographic film, Ponting preferred high-quality images taken on glass plates. With these plates, Ponting could capture images of Antarctic icescapes and landscapes.

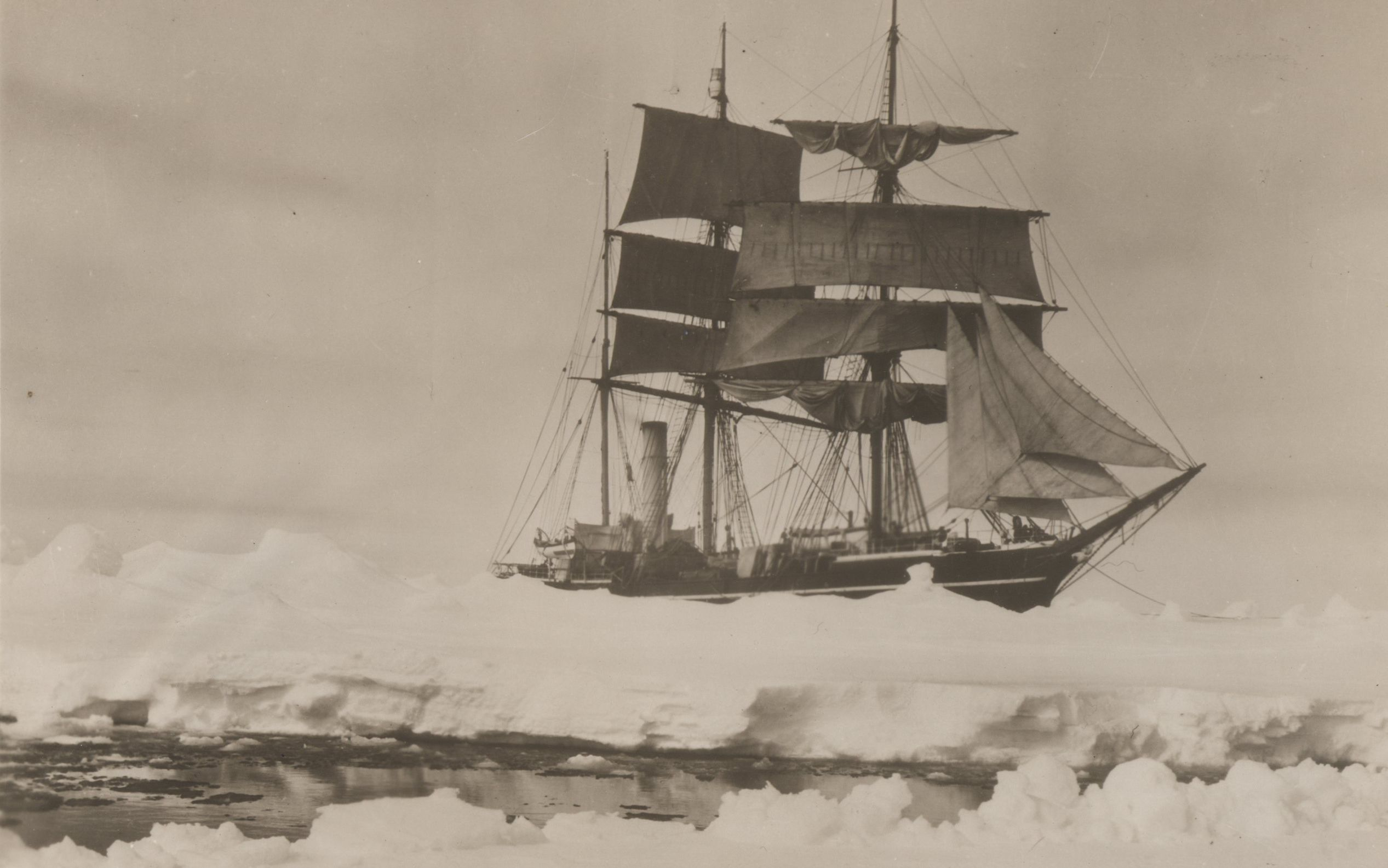
Scott's ship Terra Nova

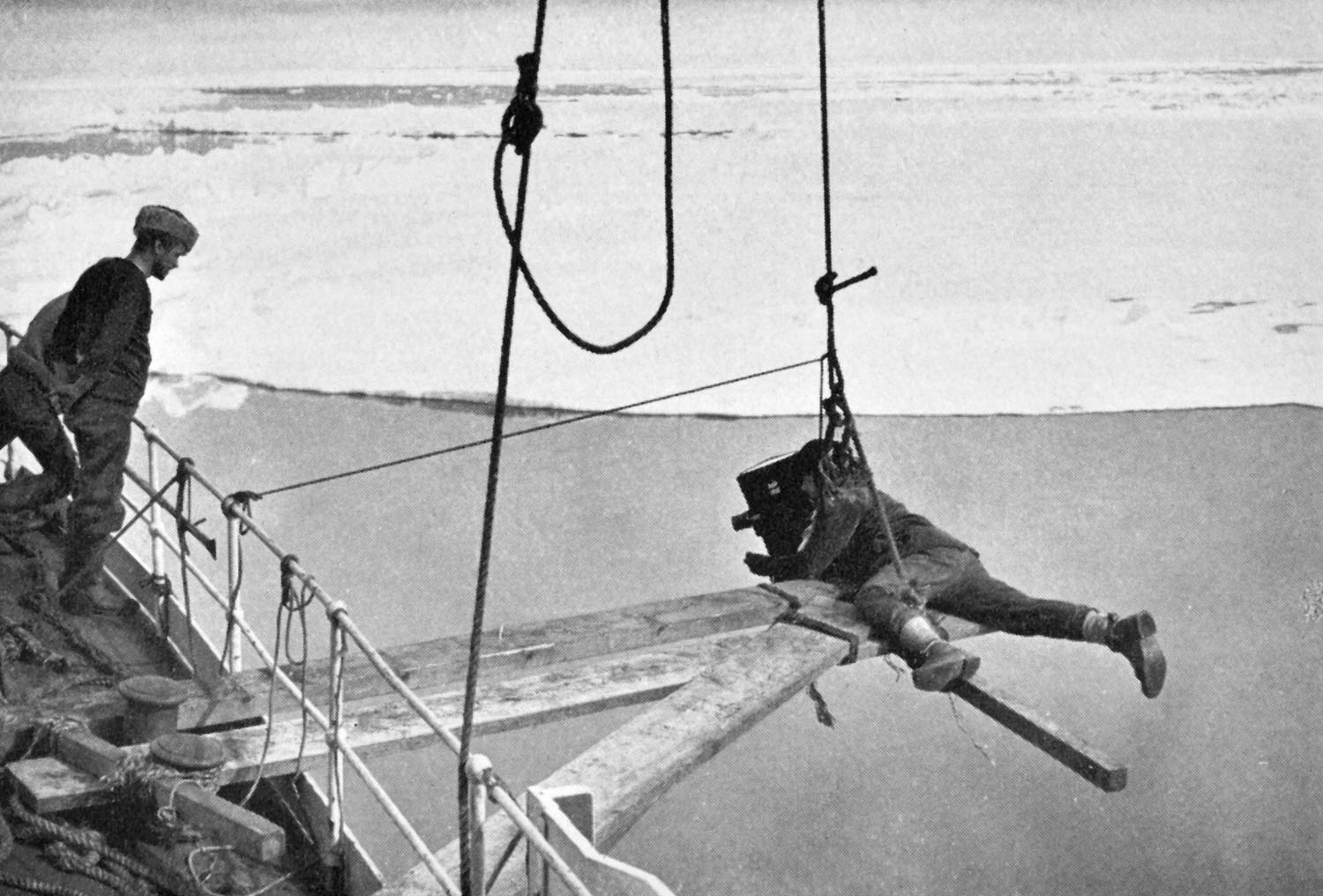
Ponting filming the Terra Nova cleaving the ice-floes

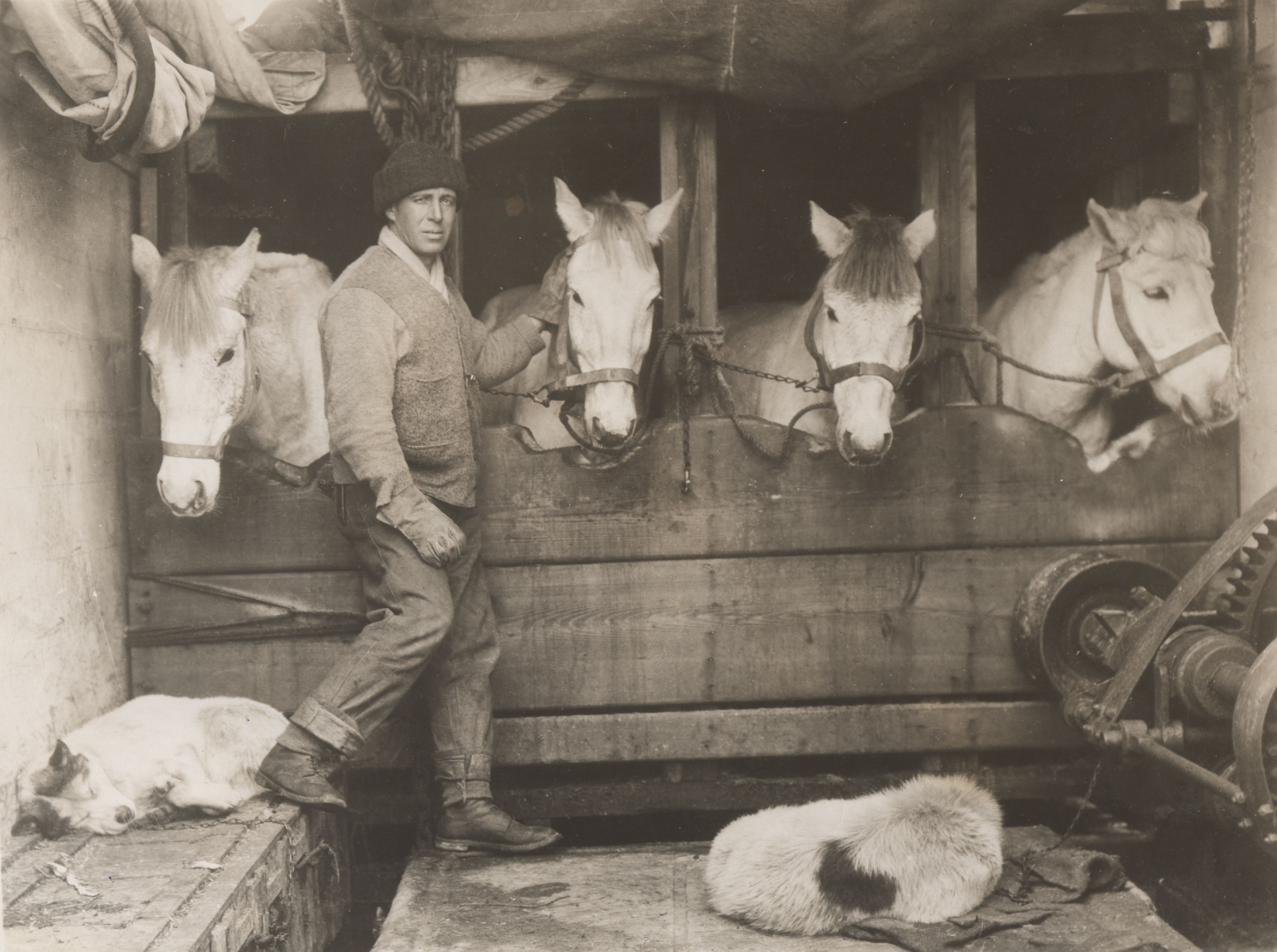
Lawrence Oates and ponies on the Terra Nova

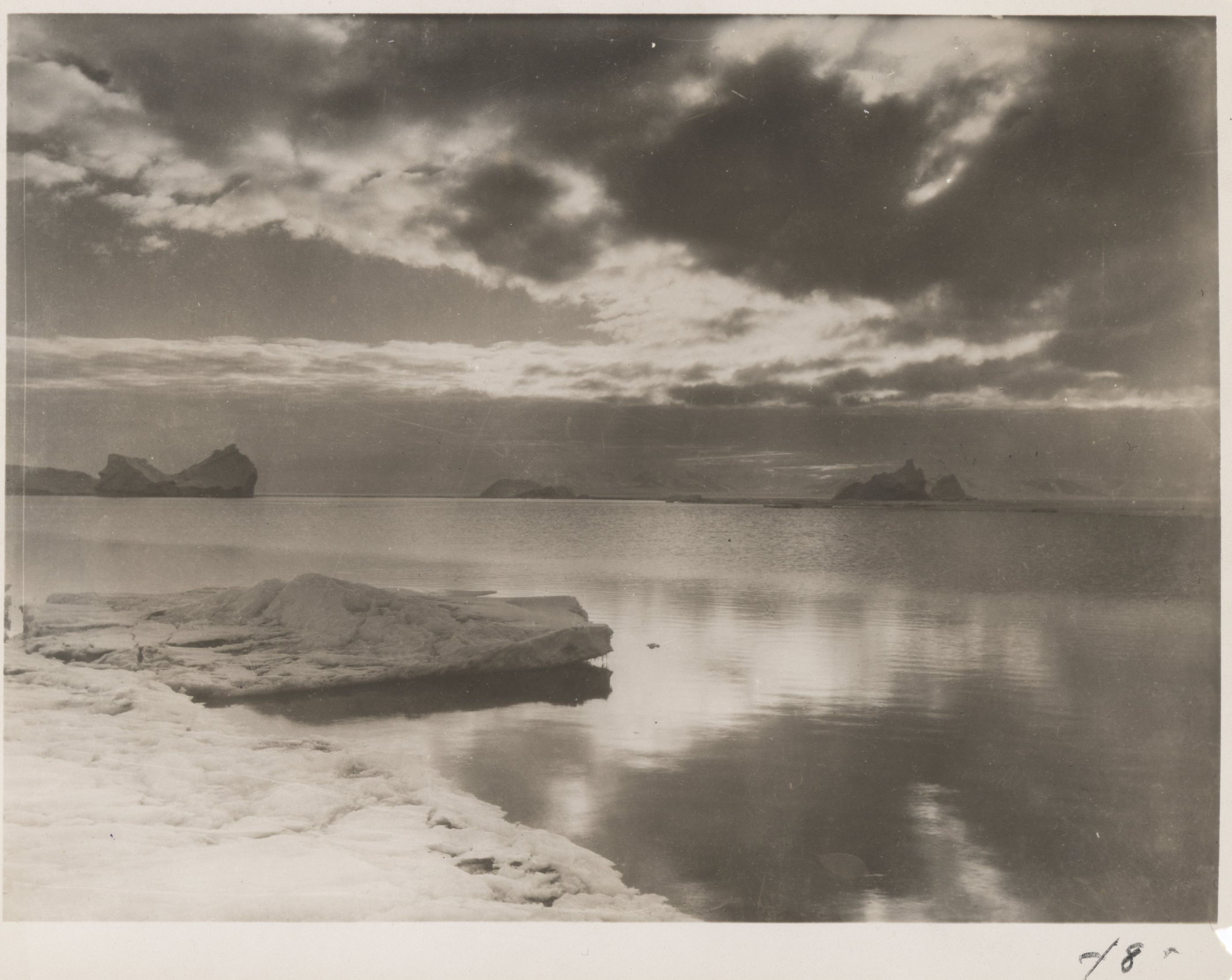
Antarctic icebergs

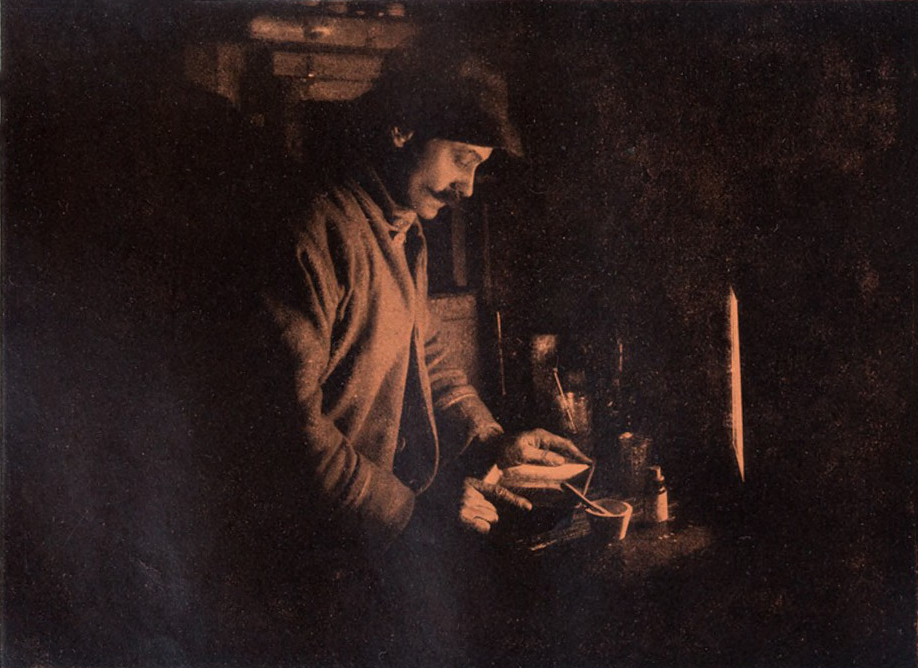
Ponting developing a plate in his Cape Evans dark room

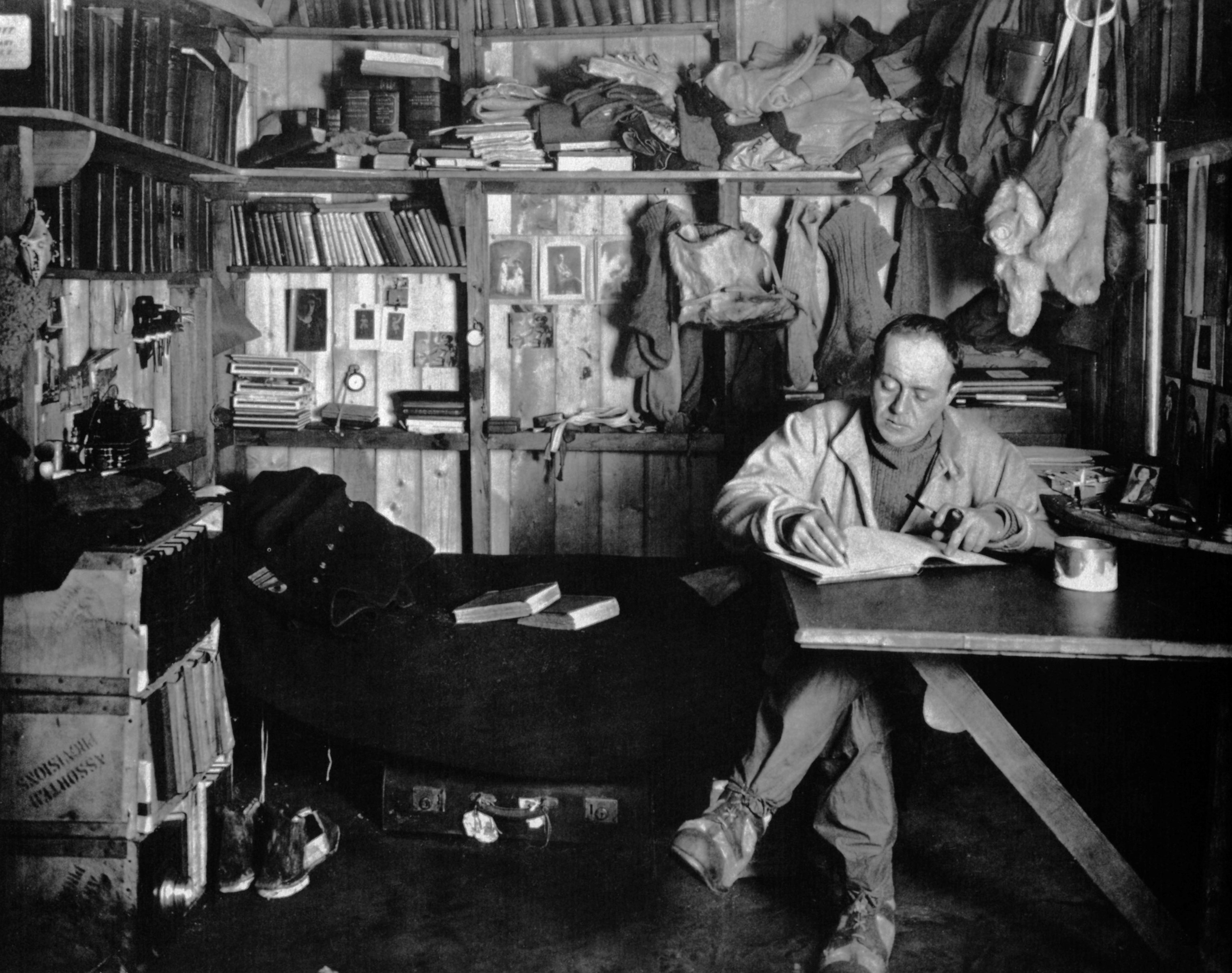
Scott at Cape Evans base

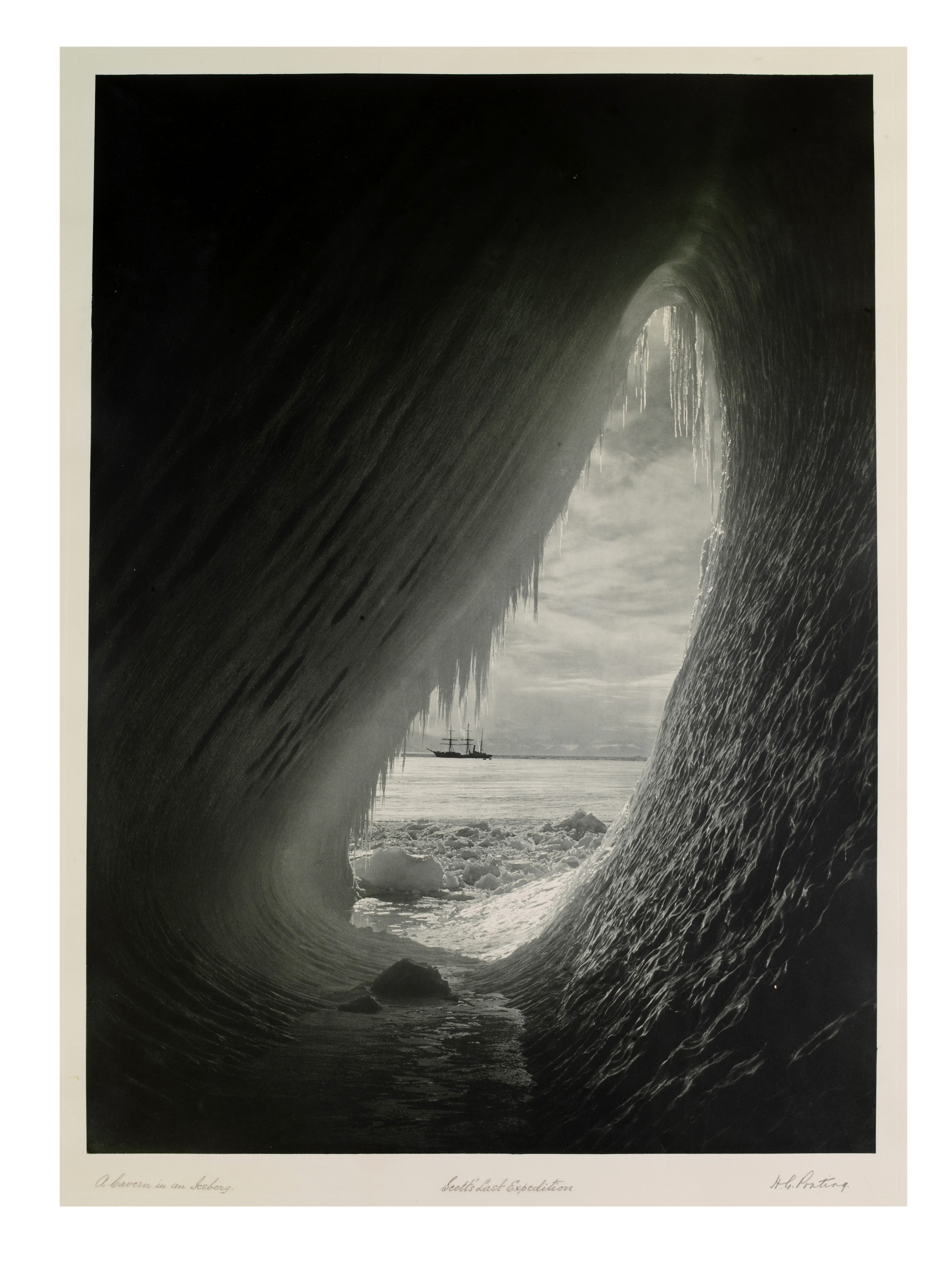
Grotto in an iceberg with the Terra Nova in the background

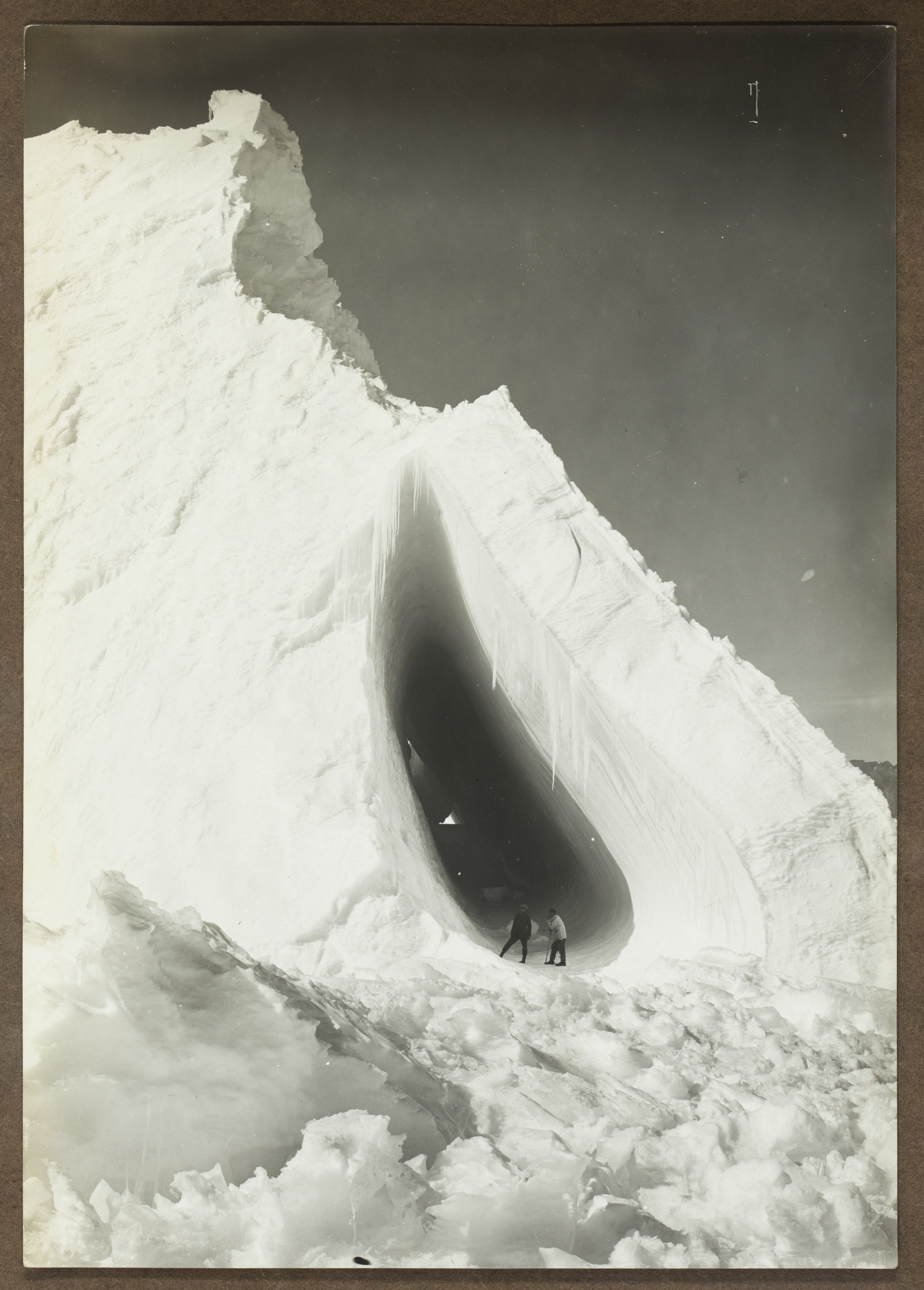
Grotto in an iceberg, with geologist T. Griffith Taylor and physicist Charles Wright, reverse view of Ponting's famous image, 5 January 1911

Ponting was one of the first men to use a portable movie camera in Antarctica. The primitive device, called a cinematograph, could take short film sequences. Ponting also brought autochrome plates to Antarctica and took some of the first known color still photographs there.

The expedition's scientists studied the behavior of large Antarctic animals, especially killer whales, seals, and penguins. Ponting tried to get as close as possible to these animals, both on the Terra Nova in the sea ice and later on Ross Island, and narrowly escaped death on one occasion in early 1911 when a pod of eight killer whales broke up the ice floe in McMurdo Sound on which he was standing.

During the 1911 winter, Ponting took many flash photographs of Scott and the other members of the expedition in their Cape Evans hut. In The Worst Journey in the World, expedition member Apsley Cherry-Garrard remembers:

No officer nor seaman, however, could have had too many of Ponting's lectures, which gave us glimpses into many lands illustrated by his own inimitable slides. Thus we lived every now and then for a short hour in Burmah, India or Japan, in scenes of trees and flowers and feminine charm which were the very antithesis of our present situation, and we were all the better for it. Ponting also illustrated the subjects of other lectures with home-made slides of photographs taken during the autumn or from printed books.

With the start of the 1911–12 sledging season, Ponting's field work began to come to an end. As a middle-aged man, he was not expected to help pull supplies southward over the Ross Ice Shelf for the push to the South Pole. Ponting photographed other members of the shore party setting off for what was expected to be a successful trek. After 14 months at Cape Evans, Ponting, along with eight other men, boarded the Terra Nova in February 1912 to return to civilization, arrange his inventory of more than 1,700 photographic plates, and shape a narrative of the expedition. Ponting's illustrated narrative would be waiting for Captain Scott to use for lectures and fundraising in 1913.

== Later life ==
The catastrophic end of "Scott's Last Expedition" also affected Ponting's later life and career. When the Terra Nova had sailed south in 1910, it had left massive debts behind. It was expected that Scott would return from the South Pole as a celebrity and that he could use moving images from his expedition in a one-man show. Ponting's cinematograph sequences, pieced out with magic lantern slides, were to have been a key element in the expedition's financial payback.

However, when the bodies of Scott and his companions were discovered in their tent on the Ross Ice Shelf in November 1912, their diaries and journals were also found. These records described the explorers' final days while suffering from exposure and malnutrition, and their desperate effort to get to a depot of food and fuel that could have saved them. Scott knew he was doomed, and used his final hours to write pleas to his countrymen to look after the welfare of the expedition's widows and survivors.

The eloquent appeals, upon publication in the British press, wrung massive donations from the public. The gifts repaid the entire cost of the expedition, provided large annuities (carefully doled out by expedition status and rank) for the widows and survivors, and left a substantial surplus for eventual use as the startup endowment of the Scott Polar Research Institute (SPRI), part of Cambridge University.

Under these conditions, Ponting's Antarctic work took on a tragic overtone and became a memorial to Scott and his companions rather than a celebration. It was, however, used extensively in the press and exhibited at the Fine Art Society, Bond Street, shown in venues all over Britain and used in numerous lectures by Ponting and other expedition members (including at Buckingham Palace and the Royal Albert Hall). When World War I began Ponting tried, unsuccessfully, to persuade the War Office to make use of his skills as a photographer and war correspondent, but his age was cited as a reason for his being rejected for war service. Copies of his films of Scott were shown to soldiers at the front who were, according to an army chaplain, moved by the heroism of Scott and his men.

With the conclusion of the war, Ponting's archive drew a nibble of interest. Over the course of time, Ponting would eventually fall out with some of the surviving members of the expedition, most notably with Lieutenant Evans, as well as falling out with the trustees of the Terra Nova Expedition. A few of the surviving expedition members grew envious of Ponting, thinking that he was profiting off the exhibition for monetary gain and fame. This was untrue, as Ponting felt it was his duty to protect the interests of not only his photographic program, but to protect the memory and achievements of his friends Wilson and Scott. In addition to this, most of the money from Ponting's lectures went to paying off the debts from the expedition, as well as to the memorial fund that was established to aid the widows and dependents of the members who had perished.

He published The Great White South, the photographic narrative of the expedition, in 1921 which was a popular success, and produced two films based upon his surviving cinematograph sequences, The Great White Silence (1924 - silent) and Ninety Degrees South (1933 - sound), the latter of which he collaborated with Evans, whom he had since made peace with. He also continued to lecture extensively on the Antarctic. These works brought him little personal recompense but he continued to work on inventions related to the 'movies', including a special effects machine which was used in the English language version of "Emil and the Detectives" (1935). Ponting died at his home in London in 1935; his photographs were sold to raise funds to pay for medical and other expenses.

The Scott Polar Research Institute purchased the Ponting Collection in 2004 for £533,000. In 2009, SPRI and publisher Salto Ulbeek platinum-printed and published a selection of the Collection. The Great White Silence was restored by the British Film Institute and re-released in 2011. During the period of the Scott expedition centenary (2010–3) his work was widely published and exhibited, reaching new audiences.

In addition, one of Ponting's photographic darkrooms was reconstructed in the collections of the Ferrymead Heritage Park in Christchurch, New Zealand.

== Exhibition ==
- 2010: Die Eroberung des Südpols – Fotografien von Herbert Ponting ("The Conquest of the South Pole: the photographs of Herbert Ponting"), Flo Peters Gallery, Chilehaus C, Pumpen 8, Hamburg, Germany.

== His verse ==
Ponting is also the author of a verse in trochaic tetrameter, "The Sleeping Bag" (1911). The poem, elaborating on a motif also found in the anonymously-authored Longfellow parody "The Modern Hiawatha" (ca. 1904), is recited for humorous effect in the film Scott of the Antarctic.

On the outside grows the furside. On the inside grows the skinside.
So the furside is the outside and the skinside is the inside.
As the skinside is the inside (and the furside is the outside)
One 'side' likes the skinside inside and the furside on the outside.
Others like the skinside outside and the furside on the inside
As the skinside is the hard side and the furside is the soft side.
If you turn the skinside outside, thinking you will side with that 'side',
Then the soft side furside’s inside, which some argue is the wrong side.
If you turn the furside outside – as you say, it grows on that side,
Then your outside’s next the skinside, which for comfort’s not the right side.
For the skinside is the cold side and your outside’s not your warm side
And the two cold sides coming side-by-side are not the right sides one 'side' decides.
If you decide to side with that 'side', turn the outside furside inside
Then the hard side, cold side, skinside’s, beyond all question, inside outside.

— The Sleeping Bag, Herbert George Ponting

== In popular culture ==
Ponting was portrayed by Clive Morton in the 1948 film Scott of the Antarctic, and by Michael Tudor Barnes in the 1985 television serial The Last Place on Earth.

== Bibliography ==
- Arnold, H.J.P., Photographs of the World: a biography of Herbert Ponting, Hutchinson, London (1969) ISBN 978-0-8386-7959-3
- Arnold, H.J.P., Herbert Ponting: Another World, Photographs in the United States, Asia, Europe & Antarctica 1900–1912, Sidgwick & Jackson, London (1975) ISBN 0-283-98214-4
- Huxley, Elspeth, Scott of the Antarctic, Atheneum Books, New York (1978) ISBN 0-689-10861-3
- Ponting, Herbert G., In Lotus-Land Japan, Macmillan, London, 1910
- Ponting, Herbert G., The Great White South, or, With Scott in the Antarctic being an account of experiences with Captain Scott's South Pole Expedition and of the nature life of the Antarctic, with an introduction by Lady Scott, Duckworth, London (1921)
- Strathie, Anne, Herbert Ponting: Scott's Antarctic Photographer and Pioneer Filmmaker, The History Press, Cheltenham, 2021
