= Carsten Klouman =

Norwegian pianist, arranger and composer (1923–2004)

Carsten Klouman (21 August 1923 – 2 July 2004) was born in Oslo and was a Norwegian pianist, arranger and composer. He was the son of the actor Thoralf Klouman and the actress Borghild Johannessen.

He was a jazz pianist in the group String Swing and Syv Muntre (Jolly Seven), he led the Carsten Klouman Trio in 1954 with Frank Cook on bass guitar and Tore Birkedal on drums before becoming musical director of the NRK Radio Orchestra and conducting the Norwegian Eurovision Song Contest entries on five occasions 1972, 1973, 1975, 1977 and 1978.

In 1988 he became chairman for TONO, the Norwegian copyright administrator.

== Honors ==
- 1966: Work of the year in Norwegian music, awarded by TONO and Norwegian Society of Composers and Lyricists (NOPA)
- 1971: Work of the year in Norwegian music, awarded by TONO and NOPA
- 1972: Work of the year in Norwegian music, awarded by TONO and NOPA
- 1983: Work of the year in Norwegian music, awarded by TONO and NOPA
