= Les Ailes (magazine) =

French aviation magazine

Les Ailes was a French aviation magazine published weekly from 1921 to 1963. It was founded by Georges Houard in Paris, who served as editor in chief. Publication was suspended from 6 June 1940 to 2 December 1944 on account of World War II. The magazine was published in black and white on blue paper, until ceasing publication for good on 8 March 1963, with issue number 1916.
