= Hauk Aabel =

Norwegian comedian (1869–1961)

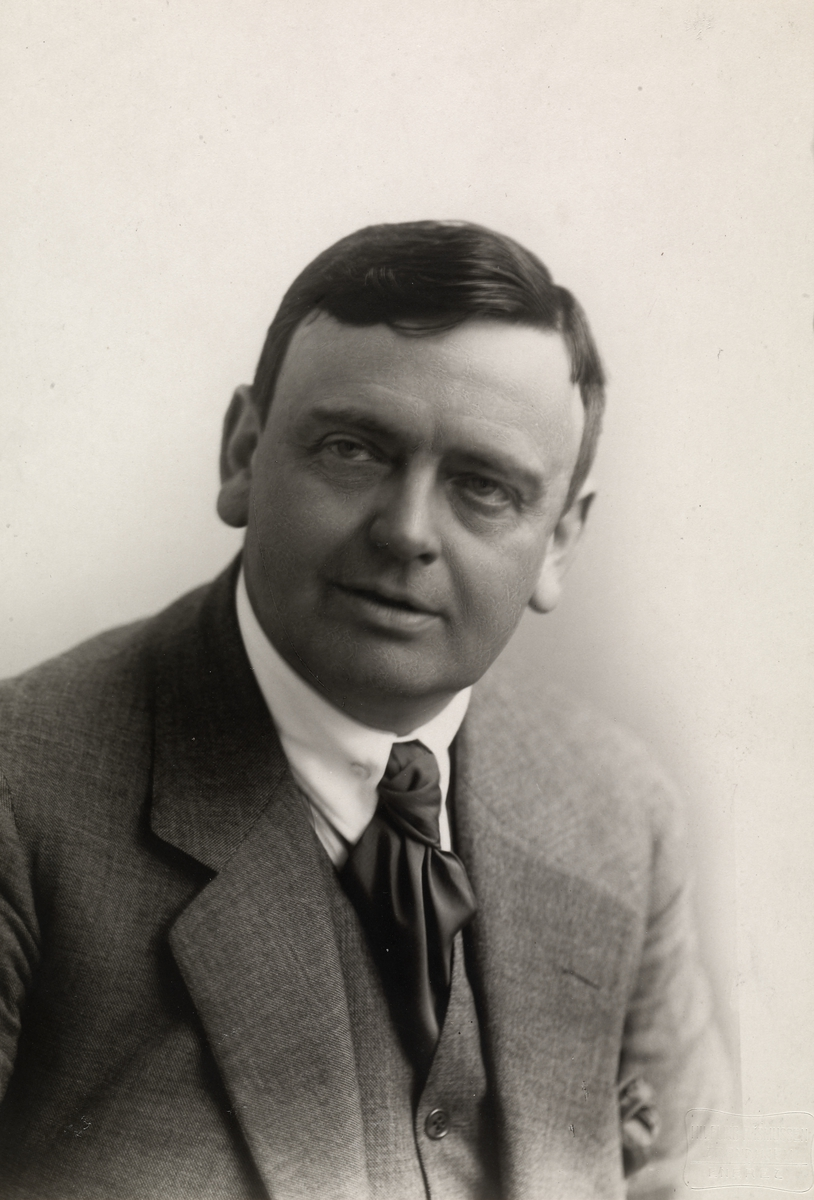
- Born: 21 April 1869; Førde, Norway
- Died: 12 December 1961 (aged 92); Oslo, Norway
- Spouse: Svanhild Johannessen
- Children: Per Aabel, Andreas Aabel

Hauk Erlendssøn Aabel (21 April 1869 – 12 December 1961) was a popular Norwegian comedian and actor in Norwegian and Swedish silent film.

== Career ==
Aabel made his début on stage on 11 October 1897 at the Christiania Theatre in Oslo, and was a prominent actor in the Norwegian theatre. In 1917, he began appearing in silent films in Sweden. He then returned to Norway in 1927, where he worked in many films, including several after the advent of sound. He made his last film in 1939, aged 72.

Hauk Aabel was a reserve officer (Norwegian: vernepliktig officer) in the Norwegian Army, with the rank of First Lieutenant.

He was the informant who provided sounding material to the pioneering linguistic study of Haugen and Joos in 1952, called Tone and Intonation in East Norwegian.

His son Per Aabel was also a popular comic actor in Norwegian films, and his son Andreas Aabel was an actor and translator. Aabel died in 1961.

== Works ==
- Hauk Aabel av Erling Alm-Vik i Norske scenekunstnere 1918
- Moro var det lell! – Mine første tyve år på scenen 1935
- Gode gamle dager 1949
