= Per Aabel =

Norwegian actor

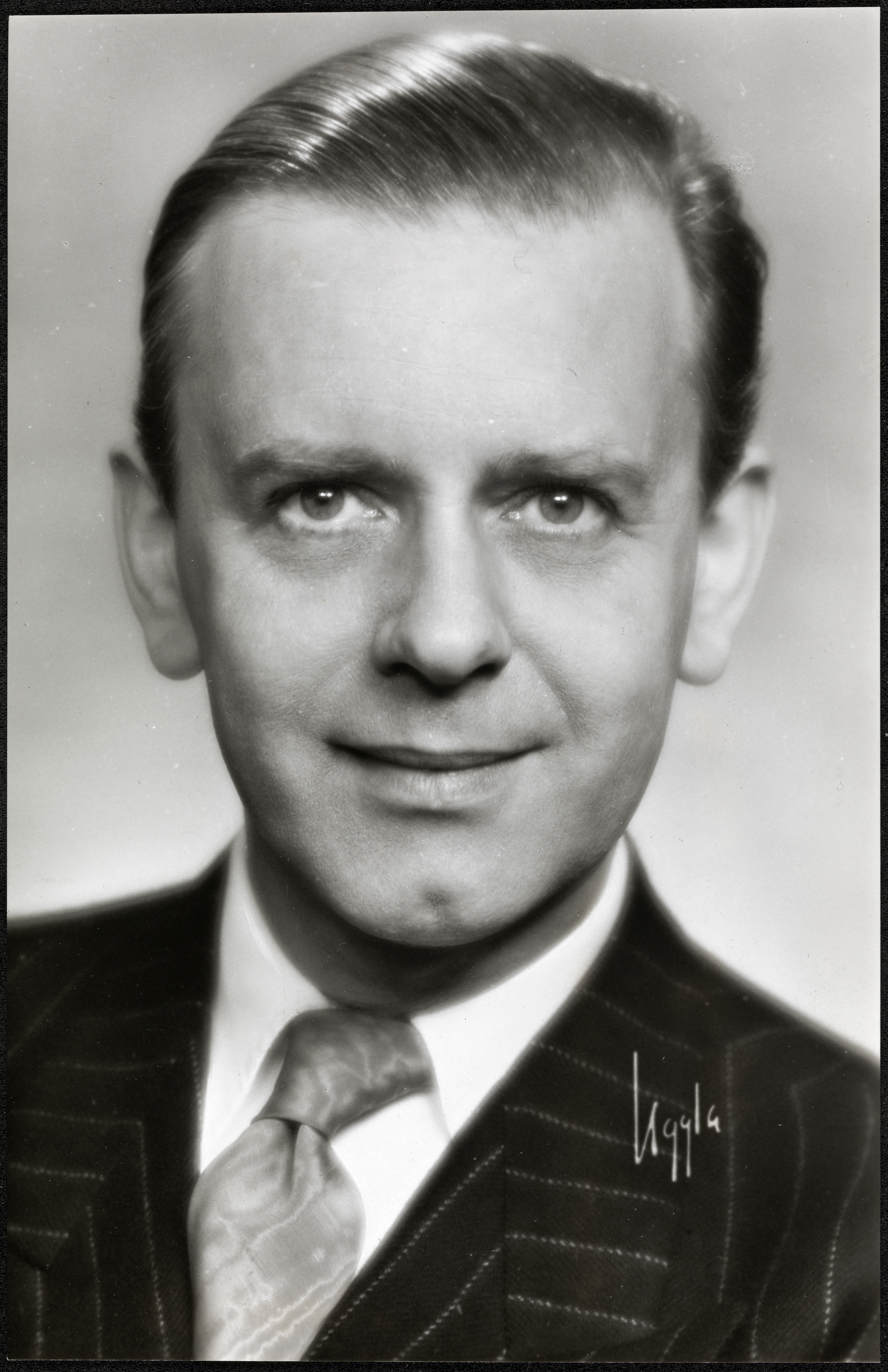
- Born: Peter Pavels Aabel; 25 April 1902; Christiania, Norway
- Died: 22 December 1999 (aged 97); Slemdal, Oslo, Norway
- Occupations: Actor; artist; dancer; choreographer; director
- Years active: 1921–1999
- Parents: Hauk Aabel (father); Svanhild Johannessen (mother)
- Relatives: Andreas Aabel (brother)

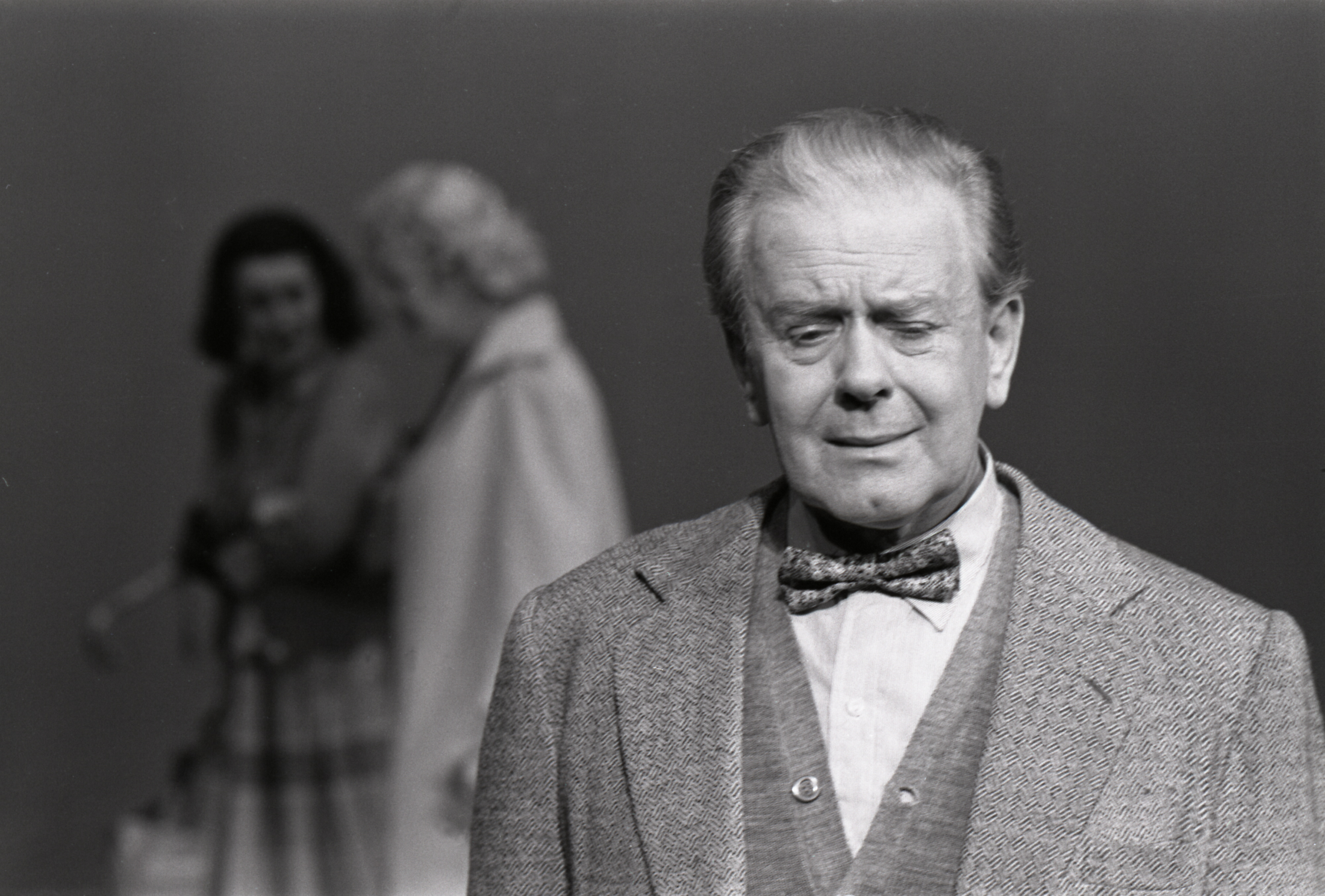
Per Aabel during a performance of David Storey's play Home in 1971

Peter Pavels "Per" Aabel (25 April 1902 – 22 December 1999) was a Norwegian actor, artist, dancer, choreographer and instructor.

== Biography ==
Per Aabel was the son of Hauk Aabel, a popular Norwegian comedian and actor in Norwegian and Swedish silent film, and the actress Svanhild Johannessen. He was the brother of the actor and translator Andreas Aabel. He studied at Sergei Diaghilev's Ballets Russes in London, after studying at the ballet teacher Enrico Cecchetti. He also attended the Academy of Fine Arts in Paris. He then embarked on training with the theatre director Max Reinhardt in Vienna before making his stage debut in 1931.

Aabel spent a number of years as a principal actor and teacher with major theatre companies in Oslo during the 1930s, and was the director of the Carl Johan Theater (Norwegian: Carl Johan Teatret) between 1933 and 1938. He did not appear in film until the late 1930s. He is more renowned though for his work with the Norwegian theatre. He was employed at the Central Theatre from 1938 to 1940 and the National Theatre from 1940 to 1972.

In the public mind, he is probably best remembered as an esteemed raconteur. After his retirement, Per Aabel was a frequent entertainer on television as a storyteller. He appeared frequently at national events and artist anniversaries. His statue, by Norwegian sculptor Nina Emilie Sundbye, was unveiled outside the stage entrance of the National Theatre in 1999. He is buried at Oslo Western Civil Cemetery.

== Awards ==
Aabel was given the Karl Gerhard honorary award in 1970, Årets Peer Gynt in 1972, the St. Hallvard Medal in 1976, and the Amanda Honorary Award in 1988 and 1998. He was decorated as a Commander with Star of the Order of St. Olav in 1978. In 1988 Aabel was decorated the Grand Cross of St. Olav (Storkors) - awarded to heads of state as a courtesy and in rare cases to individuals for merit.

The Per Aabel Honorary Award (Per Aabels ærespris) is awarded annually on Aabel's birthday, April 25. The award was established in 1979 and the first award granted to a talented, Norwegian actor or actress in 1980. The prize includes a statuette of Per Aabel designed by Nina Sundbye. The committee that selects the prize winner is made up of Wenche Foss, Bjarte Hjelmeland and theatre director Eirik Stubø.

== Selected works ==
- Variety Is the Spice of Life (1939)
- En herre med bart (1944)
- Et spøkelse forelsker seg (1946)
- Du verden (1950)
- Brudebuketten (1953)
- Den stundesløse Per Aabel (1980)

== Other sources ==
- Lillo-Stenberg, Ole (ed.) Alene på scenen: Per Aabel og tekstene hans (2001) (Andresen & Butenschøn) ISBN 82-7694-071-4
- Hansen, Jan Erik (1993.) Kjære Per Aabel (Cappelen) ISBN 82-02-13805-1
