= List of Norwegian women artists =

This is a list of women artists who were born in Norway or whose artworks are closely associated with that country.

== A ==
- Ingvil Aarbakke (1970–2005), active in Danish N55
- Marie Aarestrup (1826–1919), portrait painter
- Betzy Akersloot-Berg (1850–1922), painter
- Borghild Arnesen (1872–1950), painter and decorative metalworker
- Dina Aschehoug (1861–1956), painter
- Ellen Auensen (born 1944), illustrator
- Marianne Aulie (born 1971), artist
- Siri Aurdal (born 1937), sculptor

== B ==
- Harriet Backer (1845–1932), painter
- Liv Blåvarp (born 1956), artisan, jewellery designer
- Guri Berg (born 1963), sculptor
- Anna-Eva Bergman (1909–1987), expressionist painter
- Charlotte Block Hellum (1911–2005), ceramist and enameller
- Tulla Blomberg Ranslet (born 1928), painter and sculptor
- Kari Bøge (born 1950), writer, illustrator
- Lisbeth Bodd (1958–2014), performance artist
- Asbjørg Borgfelt (1900–1976), sculptor
- Ragna Breivik (1891–1965), tapestry artist
- Johanna Bugge Berge (1874–1961), painter, illustrator, church decorator
- Elise Brandes (1873–1918), sculptor
- Cecilie Broch Knudsen (born 1950), rector of the Oslo National Academy of the Arts
- Lagertha Broch (1864–1952), illustrator
- Kari Buen (born 1938), sculptor
- Ragnhild Butenschøn (1912–1992), sculptor

== C ==
- Bodil Cappelen (born 1930), painter, textile artist and illustrator
- Elen Christensen (1904–1967), sculptor
- Tupsy Clement (1871–1959), landscape painter
- Jensine Costello (born 1886), painter

== D ==
- Lisbet Dæhlin (1922–2012), ceramist
- Cecilie Dahl (1858–1943), painter
- Cecilie Dahl (born 1960), installation artist
- Damselfrau or Magnhild Kennedy (born 1978), wearable art specialist
- Annasif Døhlen (1930–2021), sculptor
- Brit Dyrnes (born 1965), ceramist

== E ==
- Fam Ekman (born 1946), Swedish-Norwegian children's writer, illustrator

== F ==
- Yngvild Fagerheim (born 1942), ceramist
- Mimi Falsen (1861–1957), painter
- Ellinor Flor (born 1946), textile designer
- Mimi Frellsen (1830–1914), pioneering female photographer
- Kristin Frogner (born 1978), actress, sculptor
- Åse Frøyshov (born 1943), textile artist
- Brit Fuglevaag (born 1939), textile artist

== G ==
- Inger Giskeødegård (born 1956), illustrator
- Andrea Gram (1853–1927), painter
- Anita Greve (1905–1972), painter
- Ulrikke Greve (1868–1951), textile artist
- Kari Grossmann (born 1942), illustrator, children's writer
- Nora Gulbrandsen (1894–1974), porcelain designer, ceramic artist

== H ==
- Elisabeth Haarr (born 1945), textile artist
- Karine Haaland (born 1966), animator, illustrator
- Dagny Hald (1936–2001), ceramist, illustrator
- Else Halling (1899–1987), textile artist
- Frida Hansen (1855–1931), tapestry maker
- Aasta Hansteen (1824–1908), painter, writer, and early feminist
- Marie Hauge (1864–1931), painter
- Astri Welhaven Heiberg (1881–1967), painter
- Hanne Heuch (born 1954), ceramist
- Agnes Hiorth (1899–1984), painter
- Marie Høeg (1866–1949), photographer
- Karen Holtsmark (1907–1998), painter
- Lalla Hvalstad (1875–1962), painter and ceramist

== I ==
- Ellen Iden (1897–1961), painter
- Åshild Irgens (born 1976), illustrator

== J ==
- Elise Jakhelln (1909–2002), textile designer
- Else Marie Jakobsen (1927–2012), designer, textile artist
- Gro Jessen (1938–2003), textile artist

== K ==
- Ragnhild Kaarbø (1889–1949), painter
- Jane Jin Kaisen (born 1980), video artist
- Ragnhild Keyser (1889–1943), abstract painter
- Kitty Lange Kielland (1843–1914), landscape painter
- Anita Killi (born 1968), animator, film director
- Grete Prytz Kittelsen (1917–2010), goldsmith, enamel artist and designer
- Sol Kjøk (fl. from mid-1990s), visual artist
- Annelise Knudtzon (1914–2006), textile artist
- Cecilie Broch Knudsen (born 1950), artist, educator
- Catharine Hermine Kølle (1788–1859), Norway's first female painter
- Anne Krafft (born 1957), painter and photographer
- Oda Krohg (1860–1935), painter

== L ==
- Dagny Tande Lid (1903–1998), painter and illustrator
- Edvarda Lie (1910–1963), painter and illustrator
- Margrethe von der Lippe (1913–1999), ceramist
- Ann Lislegaard (born 1962), contemporary artist
- Anne Lofthus (1932–2003), ceramist
- Marie Løkke (1877–1948), impressionist painter
- Ingrid Lønningdal (born 1981), contemporary artist
- Ida Lorentzen (born 1951), American-born Norwegian painter
- Camilla Løw (born 1976), painter

== M ==
- Ada Madssen (1917–2009), sculptor
- Hilde Mæhlum (born 1945), sculptor
- Nina Malterud (born 1951), ceramist
- Hilde Marstrander (born 1969), illustrator, fashion journalist
- Eline McGeorge (born 1970), contemporary artist
- Randi Monsen (1910–1997), illustrator
- Vilna Jorgen Morpurgo (1900–1975), painter, sculptor
- Lagertha Munthe (1888–1984), painter
- Lise Myhre (born 1975), cartoonist
- Pia Myrvold (born 1960), artist and designer

== N ==
- Ute de Lange Nilsen (born 1931), Czech-Norwegian jewellery artist and puppet maker
- Louise Nippierd (born 1962), metal and jewellery artist
- Irene Nordli (born 1967), visual artist and sculptor
- Asta Nørregaard (1853–1933), painter
- Kaja Norum (born 1989), painter
- Kari Nyquist (1918–2011), ceramist

== O ==
- Suzanne Øgaard (1918–2003), French-born Norwegian painter
- Vivian Zahl Olsen (born 1942), graphic designer, illustrator
- Kjerstin Øvrelid (1929–1989), painter

== P ==
- Alice Pihl Salvesen (1869–1959), painter
- Martine Poppe (born 1988), painter, sculptor
- Else Poulsson (1909–2002), painter, textile artist

== R ==
- Tulla Blomberg Ranslet (born 1928), painter
- Maja Refsum (1897–1986), sculptor
- Helga Marie Ring Reusch (1865–1944), painter
- Borghild Rud (1910–1999), illustrator
- Hannah Ryggen (1894–1970), textile artist
- Aase Texmon Rygh (1925–2019), modernist sculptor

== S ==
- Bente Sætrang (born 1946), textile artist
- Iben Sandemose (born 1950), illustrator, children's writer
- Cora Sandel (1880–1974), writer and painter
- Iben Sandemose (born 1950), illustrator and writer
- Solveig Muren Sanden (1918–2013), illustrator
- Inga Sætre (born 1978), illustrator, cartoonist
- Signe Scheel (1860–1942), painter
- Kjersti Scheen (born 1943), journalist, illustrator and writer
- Tone Thiis Schjetne (1928–2015), sculptor
- Hanne Sigbjørnsen (born 1989), cartoonist
- Inger Sitter (1929–2015), painter, graphic artist
- Julie Skarland (born 1960), fashion designer
- Ida S. Skjelbakken (born 1979), writer, illustrator
- Kari Stai (born 1974), illustrator, graphic designer and children's writer
- Agnes Steineger (1863–1965), painter
- Tonje Strøm (1937–2010), painter, illustrator
- Nina Sundbye (born 1944), sculptor

== T ==
- Marie Tannæs (1854–1939), painter
- Anne Kristine Thorsby (born 1962), contemporary artist
- Ambrosia Tønnesen (1859–1948), sculptor
- Kris Torne (1867–1946), painter and textile artist

== U ==
- Ingunn Utsi (born 1948), Sami sculptor, painter and illustrator

== V ==
- Maria Vigeland (born 1963), painter and sculptor
- Ingebrigt Vik (1867–1927), sculptor

== W ==
- Inger Waage (1923–1995), ceramist
- Charlotte Wankel (1888–1969), cubist painter
- Yvonne Wartiainen (born 1976), abstract painter
- Sigri Welhaven (1894–1991), artist and sculptor
- Birgit Wessel (1911–2000), textile artist

== See also ==
- List of Scandinavian textile artists
