= Jakhelln =

Jakhelln is a Norwegian surname of:

- Christian Albrecht Jackhelln (1784–1868), Norwegian businessman and politician
- Christian Albrecht Jakhelln (1863–1945), Norwegian businessman and politician
- Christian Albrecht Jakhelln, Jr. (1903–1991), Norwegian businessman and politician
- Elise Jakhelln (1909–2002), Norwegian textile artist
- Carl Johan Frederik Jakhelln (1914–1987), Norwegian diplomat and writer
- Henning Jakhelln (1939–), Norwegian jurist
- Cornelius Jakhelln (1977–), Norwegian writer and musician
- Anton Frederik Winter Jakhelln Prytz, (1878—1945), Norwegian politician
