= Hølaas =

Hølaas is a Norwegian surname. Notable people with the surname include:

- Andreas Hølaas (1832–1907), Norwegian civil servant, auditor, and politician
- Odd Hølaas (1898–1968), Norwegian journalist and writer
