= Bente Sætrang =

Norwegian textile artist (born 1946)

- Born: 15 September 1946 (age 79); Oslo, Norway
- Education: University of Oslo; Norwegian National Academy of Craft and Art Industry
- Occupation: Textile artist

Bente Sætrang (born 15 September 1946) is a Norwegian textile artist.

== Personal life ==
Born in Oslo on 15 September 1946, Sætrang grew up in Begnadalen in Valdres, a daughter of farmer and forester Erling Sætrang and weaver Elsa Randi Christensen.

== Career ==
Sætrang graduated in art history from the University of Oslo in 1968. From 1969 to 1973 she studied textile art at the Norwegian National Academy of Craft and Art Industry, where she had the teachers Gert Jynge, Brit Fuglevaag and Gro Jessen.

Among her works are Manhattan from 1985, Signal 1,2 & 3 from 1986 for Norges Bank, and Tretten til bords i Bagdad from 2003 (located at the Norwegian Museum of Decorative Arts and Design). Her carpet Internight from 2004 was awarded a silver medal at the 11th International Triennial of Tapestry in Łódź.

She was appointed professor at the Bergen National Academy of the Arts from 1988 to 1993.
