= Solveig Hisdal =

Norwegian graphic designer and fashion designer

Solveig Hisdal (born 4 October 1946) is a Norwegian graphic designer and fashion designer. She is best known for her knitwear designs for Oleana where she has been the designer since the company was established in 1992.

Hisdal is a graduate of the Bergen National Academy of the Arts (KHiB). She was hired by Oleana in 1992 after the founders of the company saw her exhibit in Oslo, "Wedding Jackets from a Town Girl", inspired by Norwegian folk costumes. She has been their only designer ever since. She is also the photographer for Oleana and also does catalog layout. She also did all the photography and layout for her book Poetry in Stitches, Clothes You Can Knit.

In 1993 Oleana was awarded the Norwegian Design Council's "Award for Design Excellence" in textile and clothing design. The company received the award again in 1997, 1999, 2001 (twice) and 2002. In 2000 Hisdal was awarded the Jacob Prize by Norsk Form, the Foundation for Design and Architecture in Norway, for her work in clothing design. In the fall of 2001 the Nordic Heritage Museum in Seattle, Washington presented an exhibit on the work of Solveig Hisdal and Oleana. The Goldstein Museum of Design in St. Paul, Minnesota exhibited Hisdal's work in the winter of 2004 in an exhibit titled Art and Artifact: Sweaters by Solveig Hisdal .
