= Yngvild Fagerheim =

Norwegian ceramist

Yngvild Fagerheim (born 1942) is a Norwegian ceramist. Inspired by American and European experiments with ceramics, she was one of the first in Norway to break away from practical applications and adapt her skills to artistic expression. Her work has frequently reflected her political views, for example in connection with the Vietnam War or the feminist movement. In 1977 she was offered but refused the Jacob Prize, Norway's annual award for craftsmanship. Several of Fagerheim's works are in the permanent collection of Norway's National Museum.

== Early life and family ==
Born on 16 September 1942 in Dale, Vestland, in western Norway, Yngvild Fagerheim is the daughter of the politician Oddleif Fagerheim and his wife Thora née Nitter. She was married to the painter Olav Starheim (1939–2022). From 1964 to 1967, she studied ceramics at the Bergen Academy of Art and Design.

== Career ==
On graduating, Fagerheim moved to Trondheim where together with the ceramist Terje Westfoss (born 1943), she established the craft business Maja og Trompeten, where they produced both artistic and utility ceramics. They remained in Trondheim until 1971 when they moved to Frederikstad, opening a new workshop a PLUS, an establishment created to support craftsmen working in a variety of areas, including jewellery, glass, textiles and furniture.

Some of the innovative relief and free ceramic works Fagerheim produced from the late 1960s reflect her political views. In God We Trust (1968) depicting a dove, a gravestone and a bomb expresses her opposition to the Vietnam War. Her almost abstract white porcelain series "Without Title": Utan tittel I and Utan tittel II (1977 and 1982) express her feelings about torture and war. Her Al Quds combining porcelain and stoneware with mirrors, glass, steel and coloured powder exhibited at the Oslo International Ceramics Symposium in 2003 is inspired by the works of the murdered Palestinian writer Ghassan Kanafani. Several of her works can be seen in Norway's National Museum.

In 1977, Fagerheim had been selected as the winner of Norway's annual award for artisans, the Jacob Prize. She refused the prize, explaining that the policy of the prize giver, Landsforbundet Norsk Brukskunst, was in opposition to her own views on how to ensure satisfactory conditions for craft professionals and the status of crafts in Norwegian culture.
