= Lønningdal =

Lønningdal is a Norwegian surname. Notable people with the surname include:

- Ingrid Lønningdal (born 1981), Norwegian artist
- Kristin Kverneland Lønningdal (1923–2010), Norwegian politician
