= Veien frem =

Norwegian magazine

Veien frem (The Way Forward) was a Norwegian periodical.

It was published by Nordahl Grieg in 1936 and 1937. Grieg published several notable articles in this periodical, renouncing Knut Hamsun and Vidkun Quisling. Issue eight of 1936 contains the famous poem Sprinterne.

Veien frem folded in its second year due to economic hardships. Nordahl Grieg died in 1943, but a book containing the best articles from Veien frem was published in 1947 by Odd Hølaas.
