= Oleanna =

Oleanna (anglicized from Oleana) is:

- Oleona, Pennsylvania, an unincorporated community
- "Oleanna" (song), a folk song mocking Ole Bull's ambitions of a perfect community
- Oleanna (play), a play named after the folk song, written by David Mamet
  - Oleanna (film), a film based on Mamet's play, directed by the author and starring William H. Macy
- Oleana (clothing), a Norwegian textile company named after Ole Bull's Oleana community
- Oleana (restaurant) Cambridge, Massachusetts
- Oleana, a character from Pokémon Sword and Shield
