= Eivind Kirkeby A/S =

Former Norwegian metal goods factory

- Formerly: Kirkeby A/S
- Company type: Aksjeselskap
- Industry: Metal goods
- Founded: 1938
- Founder: Eivind Kirkeby
- Defunct: 1994
- Fate: Bankruptcy
- Headquarters: Ensjø, Oslo, Norway
- Products: Stamped metal parts, steel furniture, lamps

Eivind Kirkeby A/S was a Norwegian metal goods factory at Ensjø in Oslo. Its production consisted mainly of stamped mass-produced articles for the radio industry, such as transformer laminations, and it also made steel furniture such as shelving and cabinets, both for others and under its own name.

The engineer Eivind Kirkeby founded the stamping and metal goods factory in 1938; it began at Grünerløkka and moved to a new industrial building at Ensjø in 1948. As a subcontractor of stamped parts to the radio industry, it supplied makers such as Tandberg, and it also produced metal shelving and wardrobes with industry as its main customer.

From the 1940s the firm made the Swinglampen under its own name, a popular work lamp with a patented built-in spring system, redesigned in 1962 by Birger Dahl. Eivind Kirkeby withdrew in 1973, and the company continued as Kirkeby A/S, with 65 in production at its 50th anniversary in 1988. Facing competition from larger makers and imports, Kirkeby ran into financial difficulties in 1991 and filed for bankruptcy; part of the production was carried on by a company that leased its premises and machines, but this too went bankrupt in 1994.

== Bibliography ==
- Bøe, Alf (1963). Norsk/Norwegian industrial design. Kunstindustrimuseet i Oslo.
