= Ivarsson =

Ivarsson is a patronymic surname meaning "son of Ivar". Notable people with the surname include:

- Jan Ivarsson (1931–2025), Swedish translation scholar
- Johan Ivarsson (ice hockey) (born 1995), Swedish ice hockey player
- Johan Ivarsson (orienteer) (born 1967), Swedish orienteer
- Karl Marenius Ivarsson (1867–1922), Norwegian educator and politician
- Lars Ivarsson (born 1963), Swedish ice hockey player
- Maja Ivarsson (born 1979), Swedish singer

== See also ==
- 16135 Ivarsson, a main-belt asteroid
