= Øgaard =

Øgaard is a surname. Notable people with the surname include:

- Leif Øgaard (born 1952), Norwegian chess player
- Philip Øgaard (born 1948), Norwegian cinematographer
- Suzanne Øgaard (1918–2003), French-born Norwegian painter
