= Oleana (clothing) =

Norwegian textile manufacturer

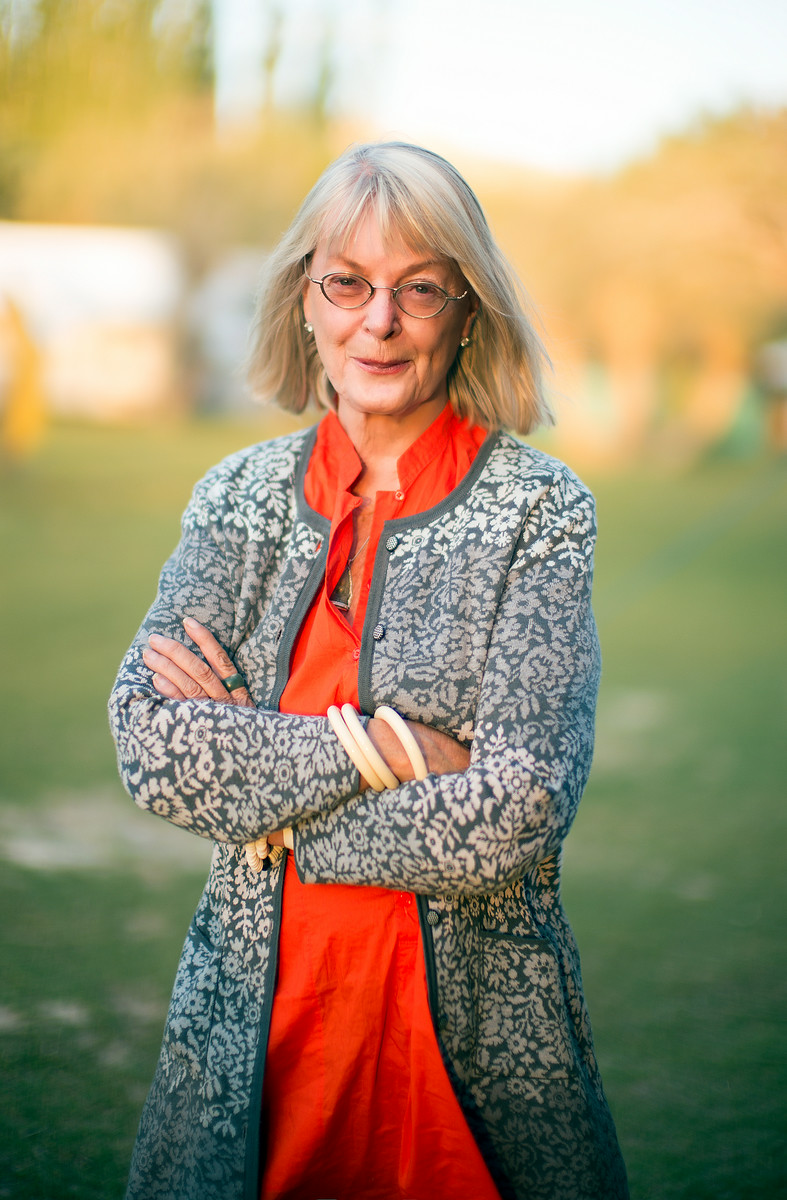
Nena von Schlebrügge in Oleana knittet jacket

Oleana is a textile manufacturing company located in Arna, Norway, a borough of Bergen. It is known for its manufacture of knitted clothing and blankets designed by Solveig Hisdal.

== History ==
Oleana was founded in 1992 by Signe Aarhus, Hildegunn Møster, and Kolbjørn Valestrand. Textile production was moving out of Norway and the unemployment rate was high. They had been working for Dale of Norway and felt that a smaller company with a flat rather than hierarchical structure could be efficient enough to succeed while manufacturing in Norway. They named the company after the musician Ole Bull's utopian settlement of Oleana in New Norway, Pennsylvania. In the age of Norwegian nationalism Ole Bull had collected Norwegian folk music and brought it into the best concert halls. In the same spirit they wished to preserve and develop the Norwegian knitting tradition. They hired designer Solveig Hisdahl after seeing her exhibit in Oslo, "Wedding Jackets from a Town Girl", inspired by Norwegian folk costumes.

Aarhus, Møster, and Valestrand started out by raising funds for good used knitting machines. They opened a factory near Bergen in space rented from another knitwear manufacturer. The Bergen area has a tradition of textile mills and continues to have commercial wool spinners. In 1996 Oleana received a grant from the Norwegian Industrial Development Fund for newly established industries. In 2003 Aarhus was named Norway`s "Business Woman of the Year".

In 2012 the factory moved into the old Arne Fabrikker mill in Arna. That company built the first textile mill in western Norway in 1856, and operated there until 1978. Clothing and blankets are produced on up-to-date industrial knitting and linking machines and finished by hand. The textiles are exported to other countries in Europe and to North America, Australia, and New Zealand. They are sold in upscale shops around the world.

In 2018, with designer Hisdahl considering retirement, the company hired Matilda Norberg to work with her. Nordberg is a graduate of London's Royal College of Art.

== Awards and exhibitions ==
In 1993 Oleana was awarded the Norwegian Design Council's "Award for Design Excellence" in textile and clothing design. The company received the award again in 1997, 1999, 2001 (twice) and 2002. In 2000 Hisdahl was awarded the Jacob Prize by Norsk Form, the Foundation for Design and Architecture in Norway, for her work in clothing design.

In the fall of 2001 the Nordic Heritage Museum in Seattle, Washington, presented an exhibit on the work of Solveig Hisdal and Oleana. The Goldstein Museum of Design in St. Paul, Minnesota, exhibited Hisdal's work in the winter of 2004.
