= Ellinor Flor =

Norwegian textile artist

Ellinor Dagmar Flor
- Born: Ellinor Bjærshol; January 16, 1946 (age 80); Steinkjer, Norway
- Education: Bergen Academy of Art and Design
- Occupation: Textile artist
- Awards: Jacob Prize

Ellinor (Lilla) Dagmar Flor née Bjærshol (born 1946) is a Norwegian textile artist. Inspired by folk art, her designs have principally focused on women's hats and costumes, frequently combining knitting and embroidery. She has also created church textiles and fabrics for furniture. For her success in renewing Norway's interest in knitting, in 1992 she was awarded the Jacob Prize. Flor is considered to be one of Norway's most distinctive clothing designers. Her works are in the collections of a number of museums, including Norway's National Museum.

== Biography ==
Born on 16 January 1946 in Steinkjer in central Norway, Ellinor Dagmar is the daughter of Einar Bjørshol (1906–91) and his wife Oline née Reitan (1906–96). She studied textile art at the Bergen Academy of Art and Design (1976–80) and continued her education at Brundalen Secondary School in Trondheim where she studied tailoring (1981–82). In December 1967, she married the journalist and art critic Harald Johan Flor.

== Career ==
On graduating, she first designed imaginative hats.

In response to a request in 1985 for new designs for machine-knitted clothes from the Housekeeping Centre in Selbu Municipality, Flor designed a knitted dress "Rosa heimafrå" and created designs for new knitted clothes for women. These designs aligned with Norway's knitting tradition.

In the 1990s, she designed costumes for the voluntary aid corps at the Lillehammer Olympic Games and for guides in the tourist industry. In 1997, she designed costumes for Bertil Palmar Johansen ballets Tiden bygger byen and Hjerter Dame til Ringve. In connection with her 50th birthday, she arranged her first retrospective show at the National Museum of Decorative Arts in Trondheim. She published two books: Rosa heimafrå (1991), which covers the renewal of Norwegian knitting, and Diva Donna Darling (1993) about hats.

Ellinor Flor's works are in the collections of the Oslo, Bergen and Trondheim art museums, the Nordnorsk Kunstmuseum in Tromsø and De Sandvigske Samlinger in Lillehammer.

== Awards ==
Flor has received a number of awards including the Teko Forum design award (1987), cultural prizes from both Roan Municipality and Sør-Trøndelag County Municipality (1989), and the Aksel Waldemar Johannessen award (1993). In 1992, she was awarded the Jacob Prize.
