= Anne Lise Aas =

Norwegian interior designer (1925–2020)

Anne Lise Aas (1925–2020) was a Norwegian interior designer who was active in promoting Norway's folk art and its furniture industry. After working with various architects on interior design and furnishings, in 1958 she became an artistic collaborator for the handicrafts association Den Norske Husflidsforening. In 1962, she opened her own workshop, creating furniture, textiles, glassware and lamps. She became particularly adept at designing photographic exhibitions presenting furniture, crafts and housing. Aas also worked as a writer, serving as editor of the furniture manufacturers' journal Corridor in the 1980s. In 1973, she received the country's annual craft award, the Jacob Prize.

== Early life and education ==
Born in Oslo on 1 April 1925, Anne Lise Aas was the daughter of the house painter Christian Aas and his wife Hildur Louise née Jaenson, who was skilled at knitting and weaving. She was brought up in the Nordstrand district of Oslo. Aas was educated at the Norwegian National Academy of Craft and Art Industry (1945–46) and at Danmarks Designskole (then known as Skolen for boligindretning) in Copenhagen, where she studied under the architect and interior designer Finn Juhl (1946–49). She gained practical experience with the Norwegian furniture firm Hiorth og Østlyngen (c. 1945). She married the architect Dag Bjørset Randers Rognlien (1921–1999).

== Career ==
On graduating, until 1952 Aas was employed by the architect Knut Knutsen and thereafter for the architects Karen and Odd Brochmann and for Dag Rognlien, whom she married. During this period, she designed furniture for one of the architect Frode Rinnan's housing projects. In 1958 she was appointed artistic collaborator for Den Norske Husflidsforening, a significant handicrafts association. She also received assignments from the folk art and crafts association, Norges Husflidslag.

In 1962, Aas established her own studio, in which she created simple yet practical works inspired by Nordic traditions. These included furniture, textiles, glassware and lamps, all of which reflected her skill in the use of colour. She also arranged a number of exhibitions for architectural and furniture firms, many of which included photography.

Aas is also remembered as a writer and an editor. In 1975, she helped to establish the heritage association Fortidsminneforeningen and became the editor of its cultural heritage journal Fortidsvern. In the 1980s, she edited Corridor, a journal supported by furniture manufacturers. In 1995, in connection with the jubilee of the interior designers' association NIL, she published Rom og møbler gjennom 50 år (Fifty years of rooms and furniture).

Anne Lise Aas died on 21 August 2020, aged 95.

== Awards ==
In 1973, Aas received Norway's annual craft award, the Jacob Prize.
