= Kjellaug Hølaas =

Norwegian textile artist (1906–1990)

- Born: 13 August 1906; Kristiansand, Norway
- Died: 12 September 1990 (aged 84); Oslo
- Education: Norwegian National Academy of Craft and Art Industry
- Occupation: Textile artist
- Spouse: Odd Hølaas
- Awards: Jacob Prize (1964)

Kjellaug Hølaas (13 August 1906 – 12 September 1990) was a Norwegian textile artist and educator.

== Biography ==
Hølaas was born in Kristiansand on 13 August 1906, a daughter of Torjus Skajaa and Karen Vennesland. In 1926 she married journalist and writer Odd Hølaas.

She studied the Norwegian National Academy of Craft and Art Industry (Statens kunstakademi) under Jacob Prytz, specializing as goldsmith.

She was assigned to the company J. Tostrup from 1930 to 1933, as designer, and thereafter she studied weaving in Denmark. From 1936 to 1972 she was appointed teacher at the Norwegian National Academy of Craft and Art Industry, where she chaired the textile education from 1948.

Her own production include decorative tapestry to the Oslo City Hall. She was also engaged as designer for Seiersborg Tekstilfabrikk.

Hølaas was awarded the Jacob Prize in 1964. She died in Oslo on 12 September 1990.
