= Oslo Kunstforening =

Art gallery and society in Oslo, Norway

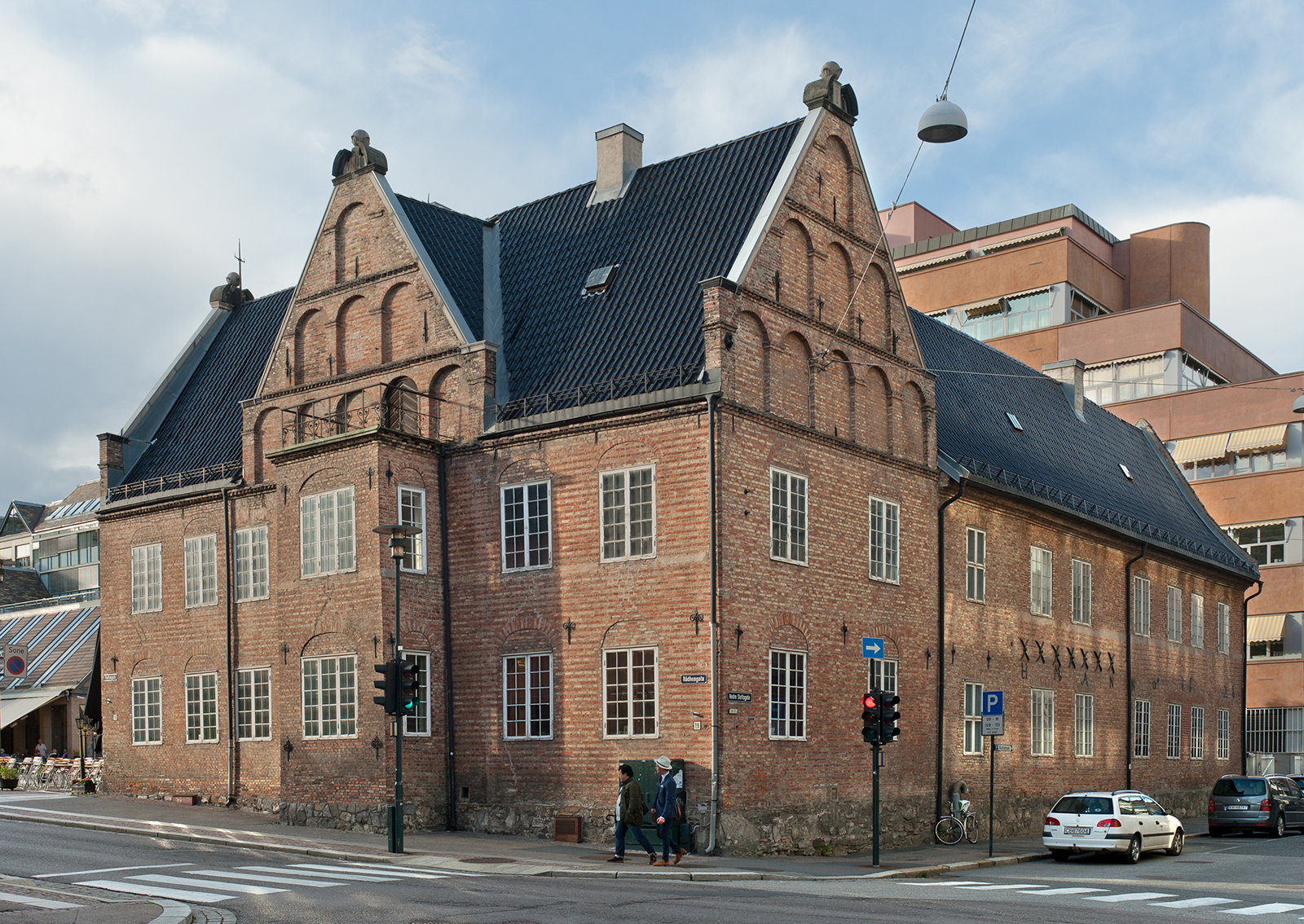
Oslo Kunstforening has been located in Rådmannsgården since 1936. Photo: Istvan Virag

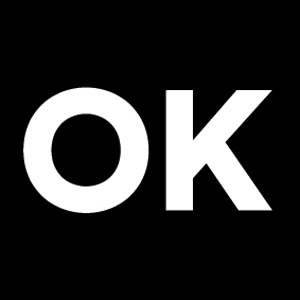
Oslo Kunstforening's logo. Design: Research and Development

Oslo Kunstforening is a contemporary art gallery and art society located in Oslo, Norway.

== History ==
Oslo Kunstforening's main objective is to support emerging Norwegian artists and present international artists that have not been shown in Norway before. Oslo Kunstforening has done this for the past 180 years. Oslo Kunstforening's main goal is to promote and communicate knowledge about contemporary art and to increase the availability of arts and culture in society.

The gallery was founded as Christiania Kunstforening in 1836 by Norwegian cultural personalities including Johan Sebastian Welhaven, Johan Fjeldsted Dahl, Frederik Stang and Henrik Heftye. It was modeled as a facility mounting temporary art exhibitions after the Kunstvereine model common in many German speaking cities, such as Staatliche Kunstsammlungen Dresden and Kunsthalle Düsseldorf. The National Gallery of Norway had not been established at that time, so the art society provided a permanent site for public art exhibition in the country's capital.

Oslo Kunstforening is supported by the City of Oslo and the Arts Council Norway. Since 1986, OK has awarded an artist grant through the kind support of Sparebanken Oslo and Akershus. Since 2008, the Savings Bank Foundation DNB has awarded an annual grant in collaboration with OK to emerging artists. The grant has previously been awarded to Ellisif Hals and Susanne Skeide (2008), Ignas Krunglevicius (2009), Ann Cathrin November Høibo (2010), Kaia Hugin (2011), Marie Buskov (2012), Sandra Mujinga (2013), Ingrid Lønningdal (2014), Andrea Bakketun and Christian Tony Norum (2015) and Tor Børresen (2016).

Previously exhibited artists at Oslo Kunstforening includes Gavin Jantjes, Fujiko Nakaya, Ukichiro Nakaya, Judy Chicago, Runo Lagomarsino, Jacques Tati, Moataz Nasr, Uriel Orlow and Celine Condorelli, Marit Følstad, Eline McGeorge and Inger Johanne Grytting among others.
