= Åse Frøyshov =

Norwegian textile artist (born 1943)

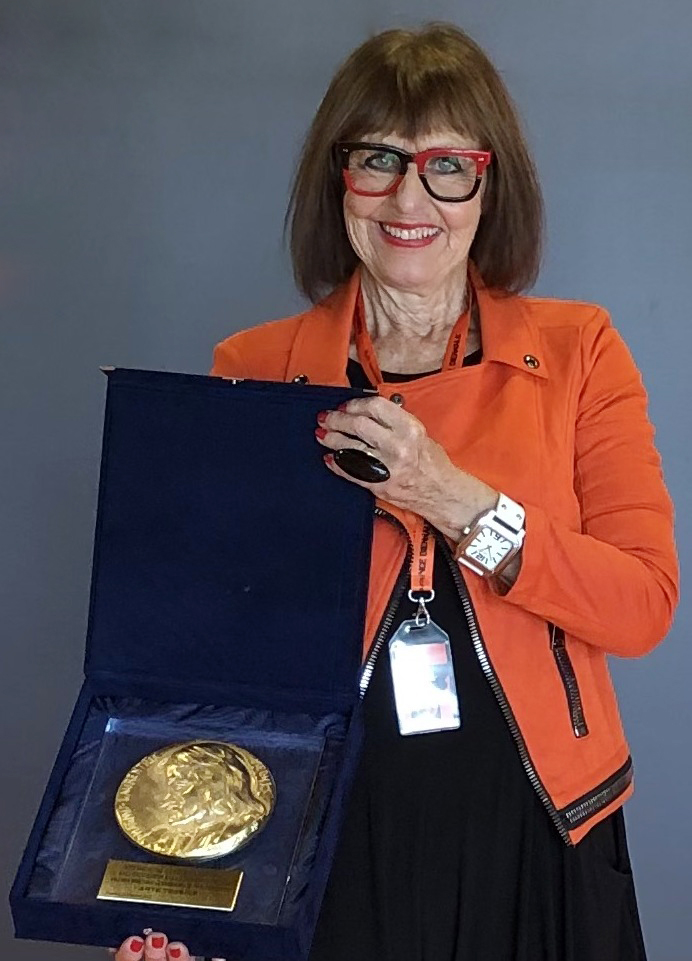
Åse Frøyshov with her medal from the 2021 Florence Biennale

Åse Marie Frøyshov (born 1943) is a Norwegian textile artist. Working principally with different types of brightly coloured wool, she has created non-figurative carpets and wall hangings including "Fanfare", an enormous woven wall display for the Tomsø Music Conservatory. Her tapestries often consist of patches arranged in collage-like patterns, extending beyond the edges of a rectangular frame. Textiles for churches, such as altarpieces, altar cloths, rugs and chasubles, can be seen in Rennebu's Innset Church and Hamar Cathedral. At the 2021 Florence Biennale, Frøyshov was awarded the prize for "Textile and Fiber Art".

== Biography, education and family ==
Born in Hamar on 11 January 1943, Åse Marie Frøyshov was the daughter of the Pentecostal priest Ragnvald Frøyshov (1908–1987) and his wife Marie Evensdatter née Langseth (1909–1973), who taught her to knit. In line with her parents' wish for her to become a teacher, she attended the teacher training college Hamar Lærerskole from 1962 to 1964, when she married a Danish school teacher and lived on Bornholm and in Ballerup. The marriage was dissolved in 1969. As a Norwegian, she was unable to study at the Danish Arts and Crafts School. She therefore studied textile art first at Danmarks Lærerhøjskole (1967–69) and then at the Norwegian National Academy of Craft and Art Industry in Oslo (1969–73). There she was a student of Kjellaug Hølaas, Brit Fuglevaag and Åse Frogner. In 1971, she married the musician Bjarne Ivar Fiskum with whom she had two daughters, Ella and Minda. The marriage was dissolved in 1984. While married, she used the name Åse Frøyshov Fiskum. In connection with her studies, Frøyshov travelled to Poland in 1971 and to Italy and London in 1972. From 1973 to 1975, she spent a period in Vienna.

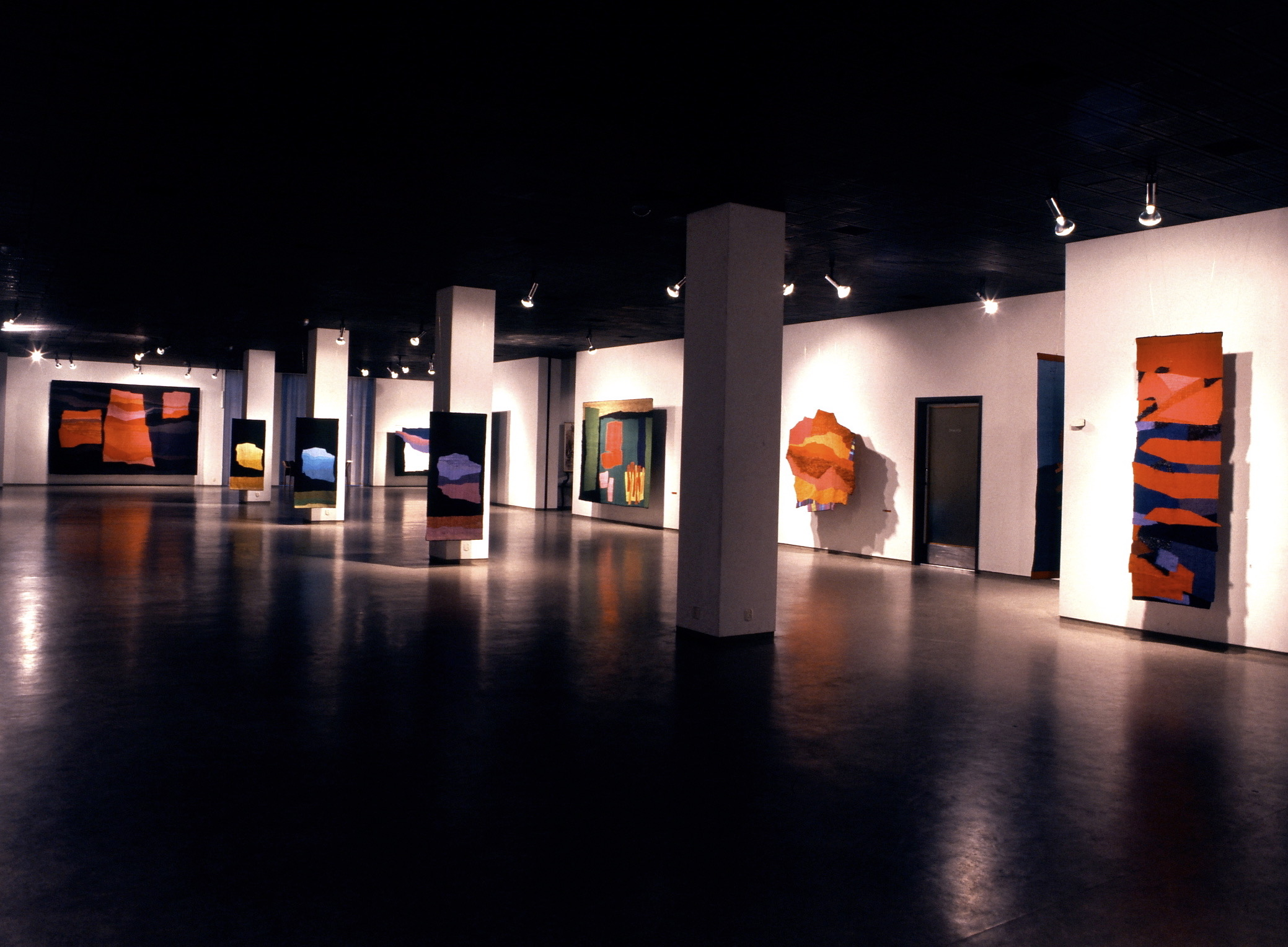
Frøyshov's works on display at the Nordenfjeldske Kunstindustrimuseum, Trondheim (1981)

== Career ==
After first creating pictorial works, from the mid-1970s Frøyskov created non-figurative collages. Her early works centred on decorating schools, banks and hospitals in Hamar and Harstad.

Experimenting with form and colour, Frøyshov has made use of a variety of mat and shiny woollen yarns as well as silk and nylon. From the 1980s, she created much larger works including "Fanfare", an enormous woven wall work completed in 1986 which decorates the Music Conservatory in Tromsø. Other significant decorations included "Fruits of Life" for the High Court in Trondheim (1994) and a series of tapestries for the Royal Caribbean Cruise Line (1997). She has created several works for public buildings in Trondheim, including the Olavshallen Concert Hall and the City Hall. More recent creations have been inspired by a trip to India.

Her works have been widely exhibited in Norway and have twice been presented at two large solo exhibitions in New York (1993 and 1996).

== Awards ==
In connection with her 70th birthday in January 2013, Frøyshov was honoured with the King's Medal of Merit. In 2021, at the thirteenth Florence Biennale, she received the first prize in the category "Textile and Fiber Art".
