= Christian Albrecht Jakhelln =

Norwegian businessperson and politician

Christian Albrecht Jakhelln (31 December 1863 - 7 May 1945) was a Norwegian businessperson and politician for the Conservative Party.

He served as a deputy representative to the Norwegian Parliament from the constituency Market towns of Nordland, Troms and Finnmark during the term 1922–1924. In 1923 he took a regular seat, replacing Karl Marenius Ivarsson who had died in late 1922.

On the local level he was a member of the municipal council of Bodø Municipality from 1895 to 1931, serving as mayor in the periods 1898-1901, 1907-1907, 1910–1913, 1916–1917 and 1919-1922. He was also deputy mayor for seven years, although the exact years are unknown.

Born in Bodø as the son of merchant Carl Johan Jakhelln (1827–1902) and his wife Anne Elise Nørregaard (1837–1913), he mainly worked in his father's company Christian Jakhelln, taking co-ownership in 1895. The company was named after Christian Albrecht Jackhelln, who was the grandfather of Christian Albrecht the younger. From 1896 to 1917 Christian Albrecht Jakhelln was the vice consul for the Russian Empire. His daughter Elise Jakhelln (1909–2002) was a successful textile designer.

He died one day before the liberation of Norway from German occupation.
