= Jacob Prize =

- Native name: Jacob-prisen
- Description: Norway's highest award for architects, artists, and designers
- Country: Norway
- Presented by: DOGA (Design and Architecture Norway)
- Website: https://doga.no/Aktiviteter/dogas-priser/jacob-prisen/

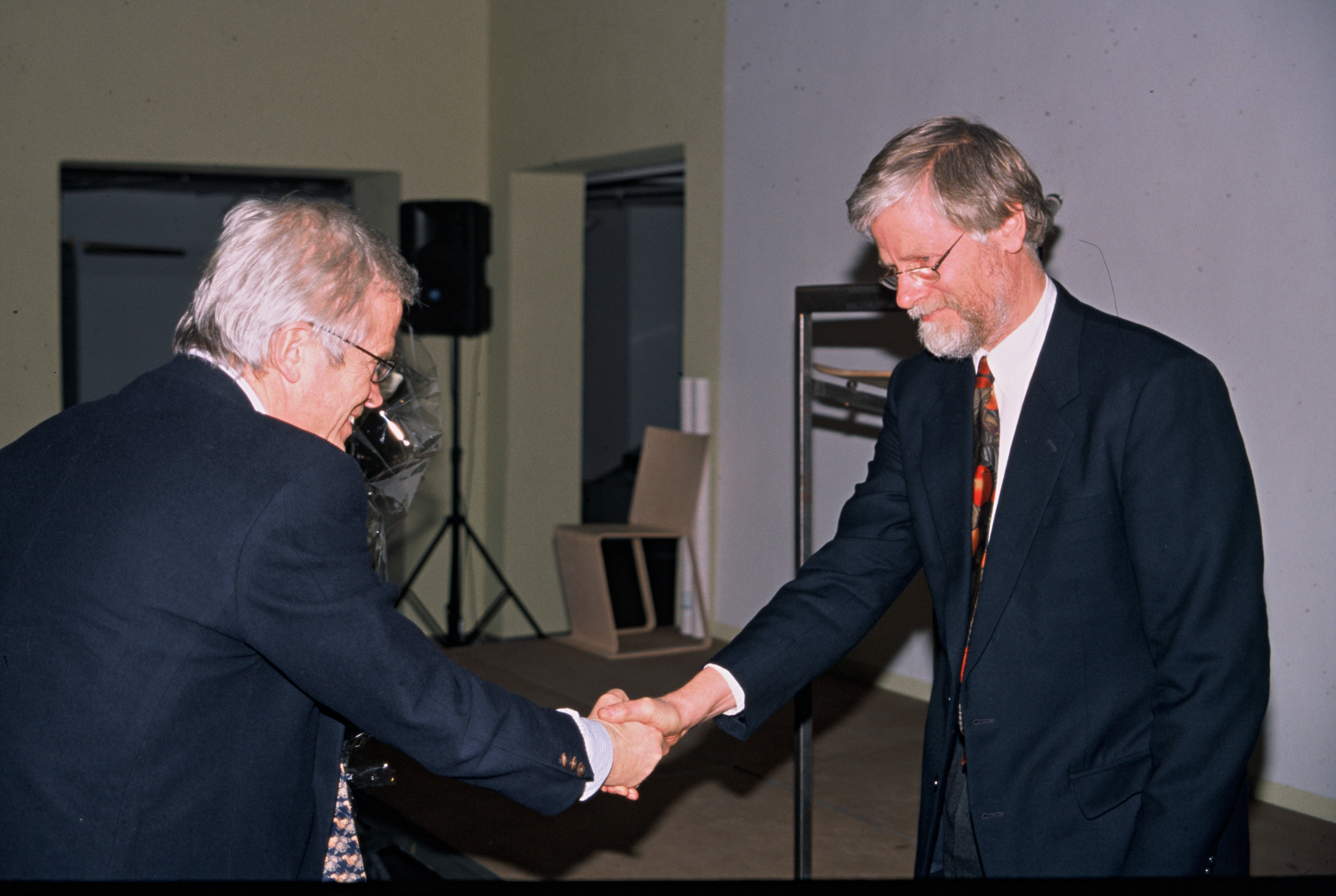
Norwegian architect Niels A. Torp receiving the 1999 Jacob Prize award from Peter Butenschøn.

The Jacob Prize (Norwegian: Jacob-prisen) is an annual award presented to an active Norwegian architect, artist, craftsman, or designer who has made a lasting contribution to their field. The award is Norway's highest design award.

Since 2014, DOGA has presented the award.

== Recipients ==
Year	Recipient
1957	Jacob Prytz and Willy Johansson
1958	Elise Jakhelln
1959	Birgit Wessel
1960	Bjørn Ianke
1961	Sigurd Alf Eriksen
1962	Bendt Winge
1963	Sigrun Berg
1964	Kjellaug Hølaas
1965	Tone Vigeland
1966	Arne Lindaas
1967	Synnøve Anker Aurdal
1968	Birger Dahl
1969	Benny Motzfeldt
1970	Margrethe von der Lippe and Jens von der Lippe
1971	Tormod Alnæs
1972	Grete Prytz Kittelsen
1973	Anne Lise Aas
1974	Tias Eckhoff
1975	Charlotte Block Hellum
1976	Bjørn A. Larsen
1977	Not awarded
1978	Ingmar Relling
1979	Severin Brørby
1980	Vivian Zahl Olsen
1981	Dagny Hald and Finn Hald
1982	Hermann Bongard
1983	Johannes Rieber
1984	Annelise Knudtzon
1985	Aud Dalseg
1986	Balans-gruppen
1987	Arne Åse
1988	Jan Herman Linge
1989	Sven Ivar Dysthe
1990	Bjørg Abrahamsen
1991	Bruno Oldani
1992	Arne Jon Jutrem and Ellinor Flor
1993	Sverre Fehn
1994	Konrad Mehus
1995	Terje Meyer
1996	Beate Ellingsen
1997	Liv Blåvarp
1998	Lisbet Dæhlin
1999	Niels A. Torp
2000	Solveig Hisdal
2001	Roy Håvard Tandberg
2002	Leif Anisdahl
2003	Petter Abrahamsen
2004	Odd Thorsen
2005	Enzo Finger
2006	Ingjerd Hanevold
2007	Jensen & Skodvin Architects
2008	Ståle N. Møller
2009	Egil Haraldsen
2010	Sigurd Bronger
2011	Lavrans Løvlie
2012	Peter Opsvik
2013	Helen & Hardv
2014	Reiulf Ramstad
2015	Not awarded
2016	Bengler
2017	Cathrine Vigander
2018	Elisabeth Stray Pedersen
2019	Runa Klock
2020	Not awarded
2021	Goods
2022	KIMA arkitektur
2023	Lala Tøyen, landskapsarkitekter
2024	T-Michael og Alexander Helle for Norwegian Rain
