= Torsten and Wanja Söderberg Prize =

- Description: Formerly the world's largest annual design prize for Nordic designers
- Country: Sweden
- Presented by: Röhsska Museum
- Website: http://rohsska.se/en/371/

The Torsten and Wanja Söderberg Prize was awarded annually to "an active Nordic designer or craftsperson". The prize was administered by the Röhsska Museum. The prize sum amounted to 1 million SEK. The funding came from the foundations established by the brothers Torsten Söderberg and Ragnar Söderberg on the occasion of the centenary of the birth of Torsten Söderberg. The family founded the Swedish iron and steel wholesale company Söderberg & Haak a few generations earlier. The Torsten Söderbergs later took of the funding of the prize in its entirety.

== Past laureates ==
- 1994 Jane Reumert, Denmark
- 1995 Liv Blåvarp, Norway
- 1996 Brita Flander, Finland
- 1997 Mats Theselius, Sweden
- 1998 Louise Sass, Denmark
- 1999 Nordic design writers: Aðalsteinn Ingólfsson, Iceland; Kaj Kalin, Finland;John Vedel-Rieper, Denmark; Jorunn Veiteberg, Norway; and Kerstin Wickman, Sweden
- 2000 Peter Opsvik, Norway
- 2001 Björn Dahlström, Sweden
- 2002 HC Ericson, Sweden
- 2003 Sigurdur Gústafsson, Iceland
- 2004 Janna Syvänoja, Finland
- 2005 Anna Rosén, Cynthia Charwick, Maria Uggla, Maria Widell Christiansen, Camilla Palmertz, Eva-Lisa Andersson, Elna Holmberg, Lena Ekelund and Tatiana Butovitsch Temm, Sweden
- 2006 Ole Jensen, Denmark
- 2007 Norway Says; Torbjørn Anderssen, Andreas Engesvik and Espen Voll, Norway
- 2008 Steinunn Sigurðardóttir, Iceland
- 2009 Harri Koskinen, Finland
- 2010 Front: Sofia Lagerkvist, Charlotte von der Lancken and Anna Lindgren, Sweden
- 2011 Henrik Vibskov, Denmark
- 2012 Sigurd Bronger, Norway
- 2013 Hjalti Karlsson, Iceland
- 2014 Ann-Sofie Back, Sweden
- 2015 Ilkka Suppanen, Finland
- 2016 Margrethe Odgaard, Denmark
- 2017 Daniel Rybakken, Norway
- 2018 Brynjar Sigurðarson, Iceland
