= Inger Johanne Grytting =

Norwegian artist

Inger Johanne Grytting (born 1949 in Svolvær) is a Norwegian artist primarily known for drawing and painting. She lives and works in New York City.

Inger Johanne Grytting has exhibited her art in Norway and internationally. Grytting is included in the permanent collections of the National Museum of Art, Architecture and Design, Oslo; Stavanger Kunstmuseum, Stavanger; Nordland fylkeskommune, Nordland, the Albany Print Museum, Albany Institute of History & Art, and others.

Grytting has had solo presentations at Oslo Kunstforening, Oslo (2016); Northern Norway Art Museum, Tromsø (2015); Muriel Guepin Gallery, New York City (2014); Galleri Svalbard, Longyearbyen (2013); North Norwegian Artists Center, Svolvær (2012) and Tegnerforbundet, Oslo (2003).

== Selected group exhibitions ==
- Treasures — Skatter, North Norwegian Artists Center, Tromsø (2016)
- Platons Huskestue, Tegnerforbundet, Oslo (2016)
- Brudd og kontinuitet — Tegnerforbundet 100 år, Tegnerforbundet, Oslo (2016)
- One More Week of Summer, Muriel Guepin Gallery, New York (2015)
- Passasje, Bodø Kunstforening (2015)
- Twenty-three Artists from In and Around, Bushwick Open Studios, Brooklyn, NY (2014)
- 12 falsa ark, North Norwegian Artists Center, Svolvær (2014)
- Disegno.3, The Boiler Room Contemporary Art Projects, Copenhagen (2013)
- Righteous Perpetrators, A.I.R Gallery, Brooklyn, NY (2012)
- Selected Works from the Collection of Sparebank1 Nord-Norges Stiftelse, Nordnorsk Kunstmuseum, Tromsø (2011)
