= Oddleif Fagerheim =

Norwegian politician

Member of the Storting
- In office 1 October 1969 – 30 September 1981
- Constituency: Sogn og Fjordane

Deputy Mayor of Fjaler
- In office 1966–1967

Personal details
- Born: 20 September 1911 Ytre Holmedal, Norway
- Died: 11 December 1999 (aged 88) Sunnfjord, Norway
- Party: Labour Party
- Children: Yngvild Fagerheim
- Occupation: Politician; teacher
- Awards: Sogn og Fjordane Fylkeskulturpris (1991)

Oddleif Fagerheim (20 September 1911, in Ytre Holmedal Municipality – 11 December 1999) was a Norwegian politician for the Labour Party.

He was elected to the Parliament of Norway from Sogn og Fjordane in 1969, and was re-elected on two occasions. He had previously served as a deputy representative during the terms 1950–1953 and 1958–1961.

On the local level he was a member of the municipal council for Fjaler Municipality from 1937 to 1975, serving as deputy mayor in 1966–1967. He chaired the municipal party chapter for some time and later the county party chapter from 1948 to 1950.

Outside politics he worked in education.
