= Aud Dalseg =

Norwegian architect (born 1938)

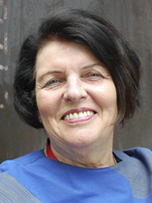
- Born: 5 December 1938 (age 87); Oslo, Norway
- Education: Norwegian National Academy of Craft and Art Industry
- Occupations: Interior architect, exhibition architect
- Awards: Jacob Prize (1985)

Aud Dalseg (born 5 December 1938) is a Norwegian interior architect, who has specialized in exhibition design.

== Biography ==
Dalseg was born in Oslo on 5 December 1938. She graduated from the Norwegian National Academy of Craft and Art Industry (Statens kunstakademi) in 1962. She was assigned to Norsk Designcentrum from 1968 to 1974, and has worked for the Norwegian Armed Forces Museum, Landsforbundet Norsk Brukskunst, and Norsk Form.

Her books include Utstilling som form from 2013, presenting about 400 of her exhibitions. She is also co-writer of the book Interiørplanlegging og innredning av boligen from 1978.

Dalseg was awarded the Jacob Prize in 1985. She has assumed honorary membership of Foreningen Norske Brukskunstnere, and of the Norske interiørarkitekters og møbeldesigneres landsforening.
