= Andreas Hølaas =

Andreas Olsen Hølaas (28 July 1832 – 17 July 1907) was a Norwegian civil servant, auditor and politician for the Liberal Party.

He was born in Leksvik Municipality as a son of farmers. He finished secondary education as a private candidate in 1862, and took the cand.jur. degree in 1866. He worked as a clerk in the Norwegian Ministry of the Navy and Postal Affairs until he was hired in the Norwegian Ministry of Auditing in 1875. From 1881 to 1888 he was one of the Auditors-General. He was selected by the Parliament of Norway, where he had contacts, among others to Johan Sverdrup, because of his involvement since 1879 in the Liberal Party. He was also involved in Kristiania Arbeidersamfund, and edited their publications Samfundet and Demokraten. He was also a Landsmål/Nynorsk proponent. From 1888 to 1907 he was the Vogt in Setesdalen.

Hølaas was married to Jocumine Oline Jonasdatter Støre (1833–1881) from September 1968 to her death. From April 1887 he was married to Anna Christine Bakke (1845–1920). He was the paternal great-grandfather of Odd Hølaas. He died in July 1907 in Evje.
