= Signe Scheel =

Norwegian artist (1860–1942)

- Born: 23 November 1860; Hamar, Norway
- Died: 15 December 1942 (aged 82); Oslo, Norway
- Known for: Painting

Signe Scheel (1860–1942) was a Norwegian painter.

== Biography ==
Scheel was born 23 November 1860 in Hamar. She studied with Christian Krohg in Norway, with Karl Gussow in Berlin, Germany, and with Pascal Dagnan-Bouveret at the Académie Colarossi in Paris, France.

Scheel exhibited frequently at the Høstutstillingen. Her most famous work, The Lord's Servant, is in the National Museum of Art in Oslo.

Scheel died 15 December 1942 in Oslo.

== Legacy ==
In 2017, the Signe Scheel Hall was established at Skrivergarden Undesløs, where Scheel lived from 1877 to 1898.

== Gallery ==
Lord's Servant by Signe Scheel

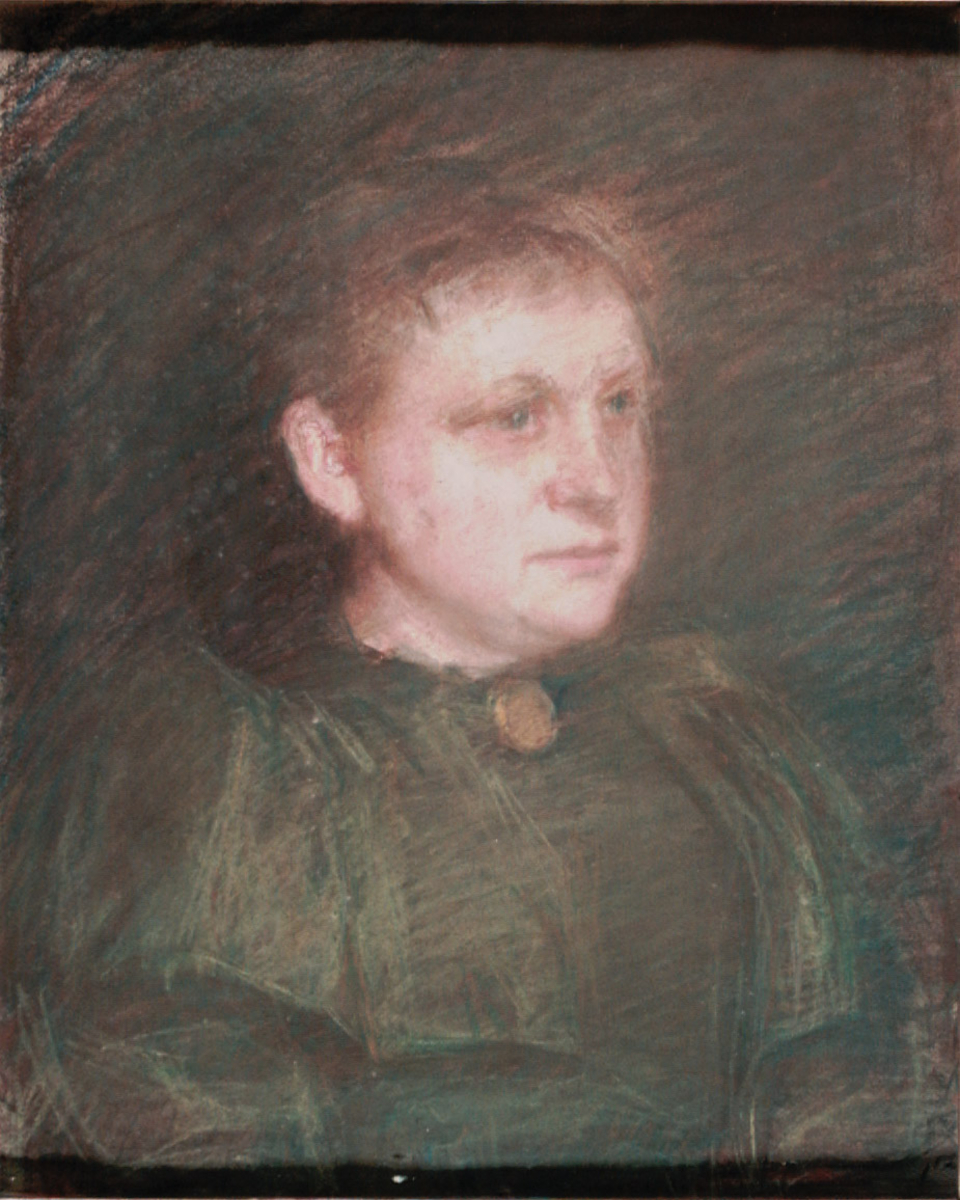
Portrait of Marie Tannæs (1892), by Signe Scheel

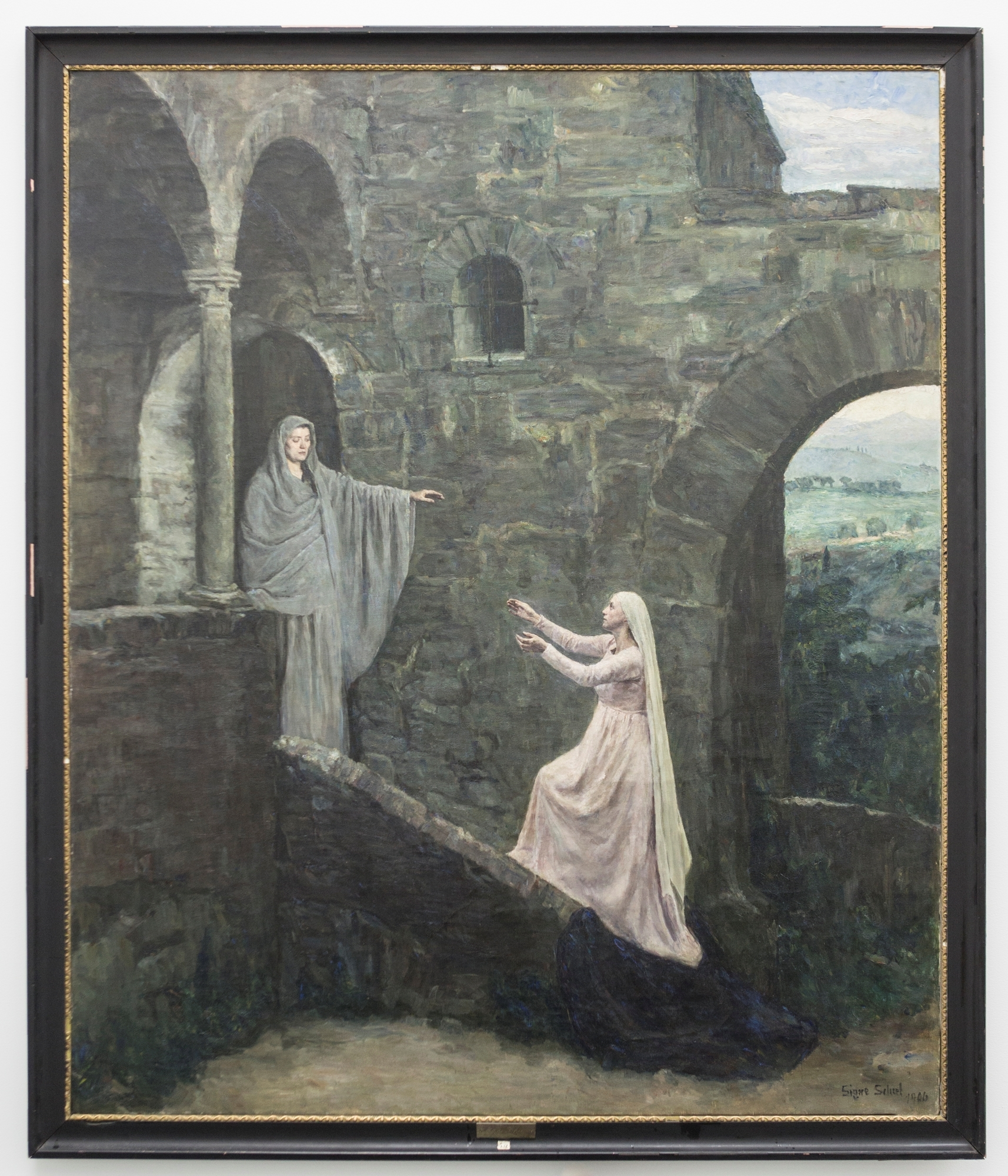
Mary's visit to Elizabeth, 1906
