= Marie Tannæs =

Norwegian artist (1854–1939)

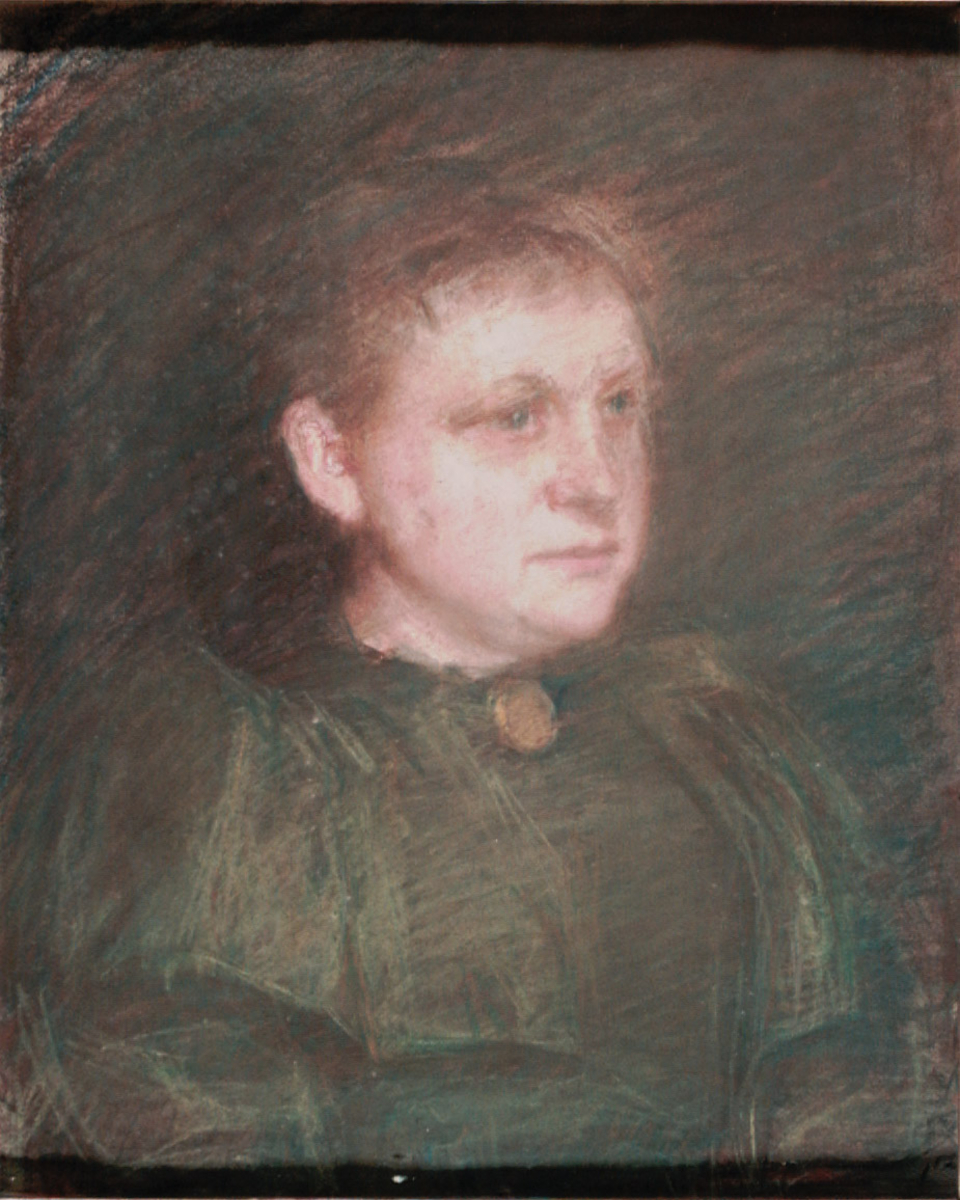
- Portrait of Marie Tannæs, 1892 by Signe Scheel
- Born: 19 March 1854; Oslo, Norway
- Died: 20 February 1939 (aged 84); Copenhagen, Denmark
- Known for: Painting

Marie Katharine Helene Tannæs (1854–1939), was a Norwegian painter known for her landscape paintings.

== Biography ==
Tannæs was born 19 March 1854 in Oslo. She studied with Carl Schøyen, Christian Wexelsen, Christian Krohg, Hans Heyerdahl, Erik Werenskiold, and Pierre Puvis de Chavannes. She attend the Académie Colarossi in Paris from 1888 through 1889.

Tannæs exhibited frequently at the Høstutstillingen. She exhibited her work at the Palace of Fine Arts at the 1893 World's Columbian Exposition in Chicago, Illinois. Tannæs received an honorable mention at the Exposition Universelle in Paris in 1889, a bronze medal at the 1900 Exposition Universelle in Paris, and a Silver Medal at the Panama–Pacific International Exposition in San Francisco in 1915.

Tannæs died 20 February 1939 in Copenhagen, Denmark.

== Gallery ==
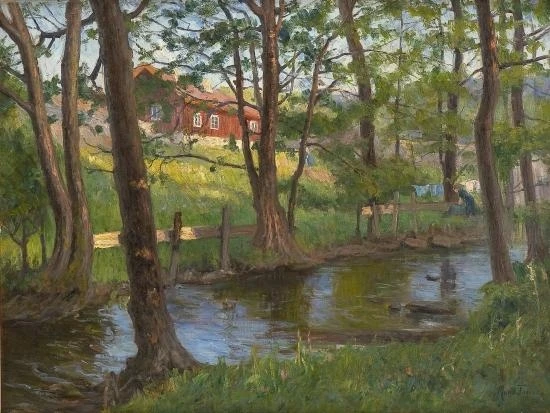
Washing clothes

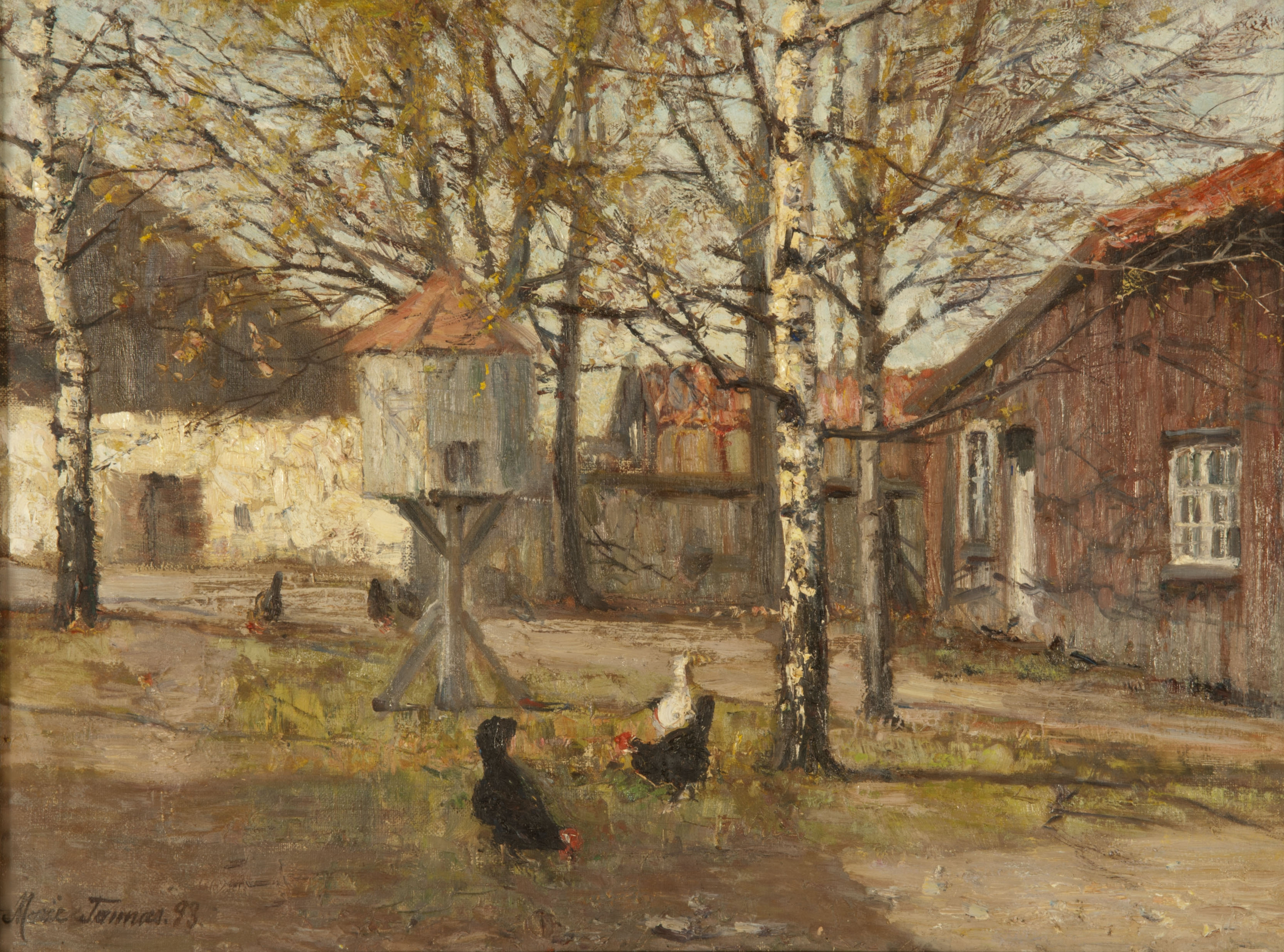
Gårdsinteriør (Vøienvolden), 1893 Stavanger kunstmuseum

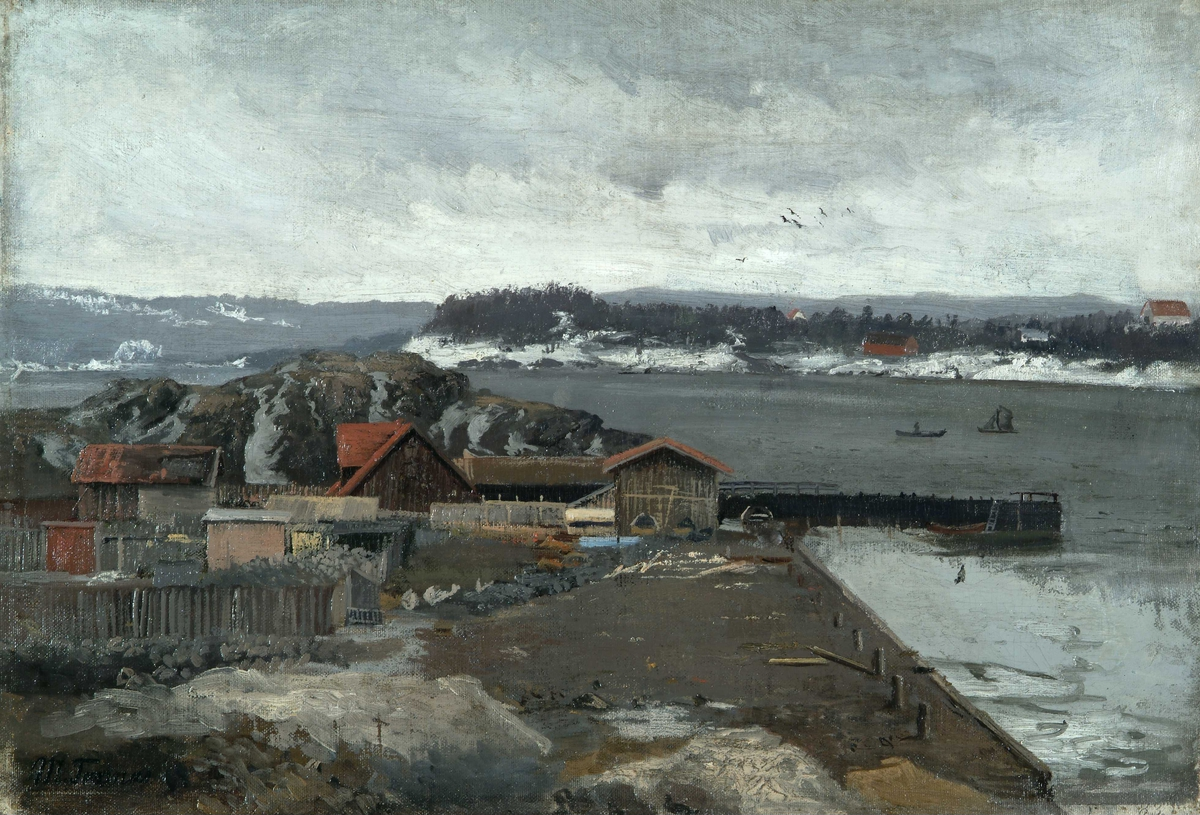
Tyveholmen, 1883 Oslo Museum

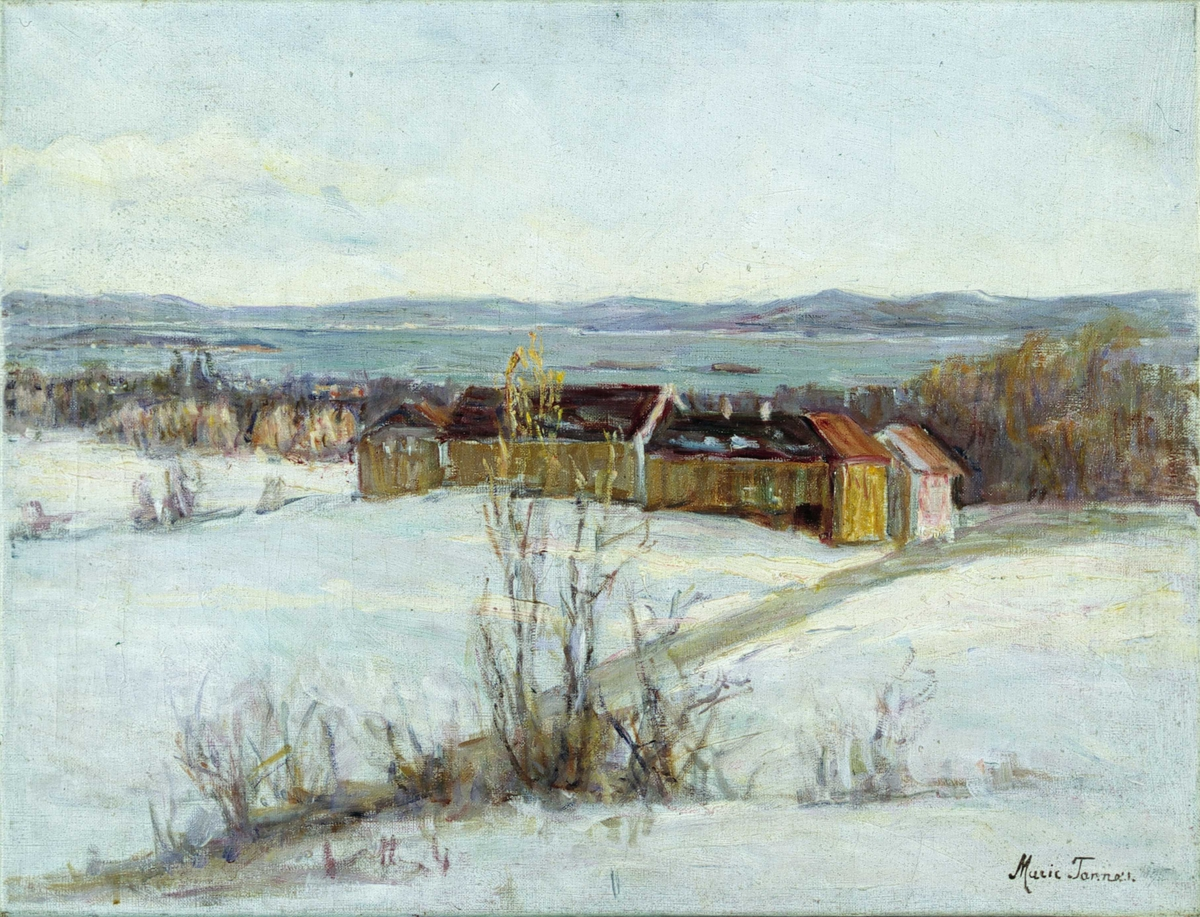
Borgen Gård, Vestre Aker, 1895 Oslo Museum

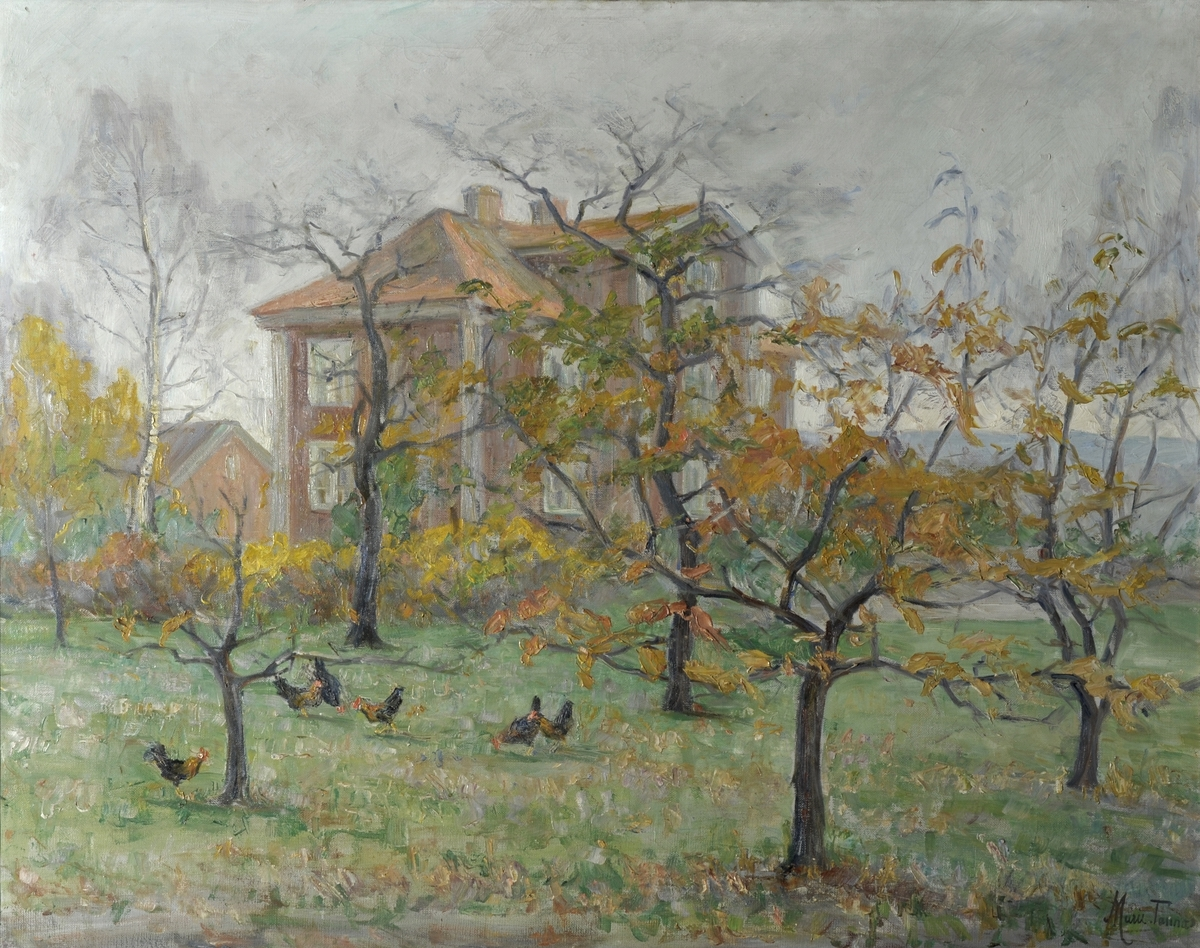
Brochmannshaugen, 1900 Oslo Museum

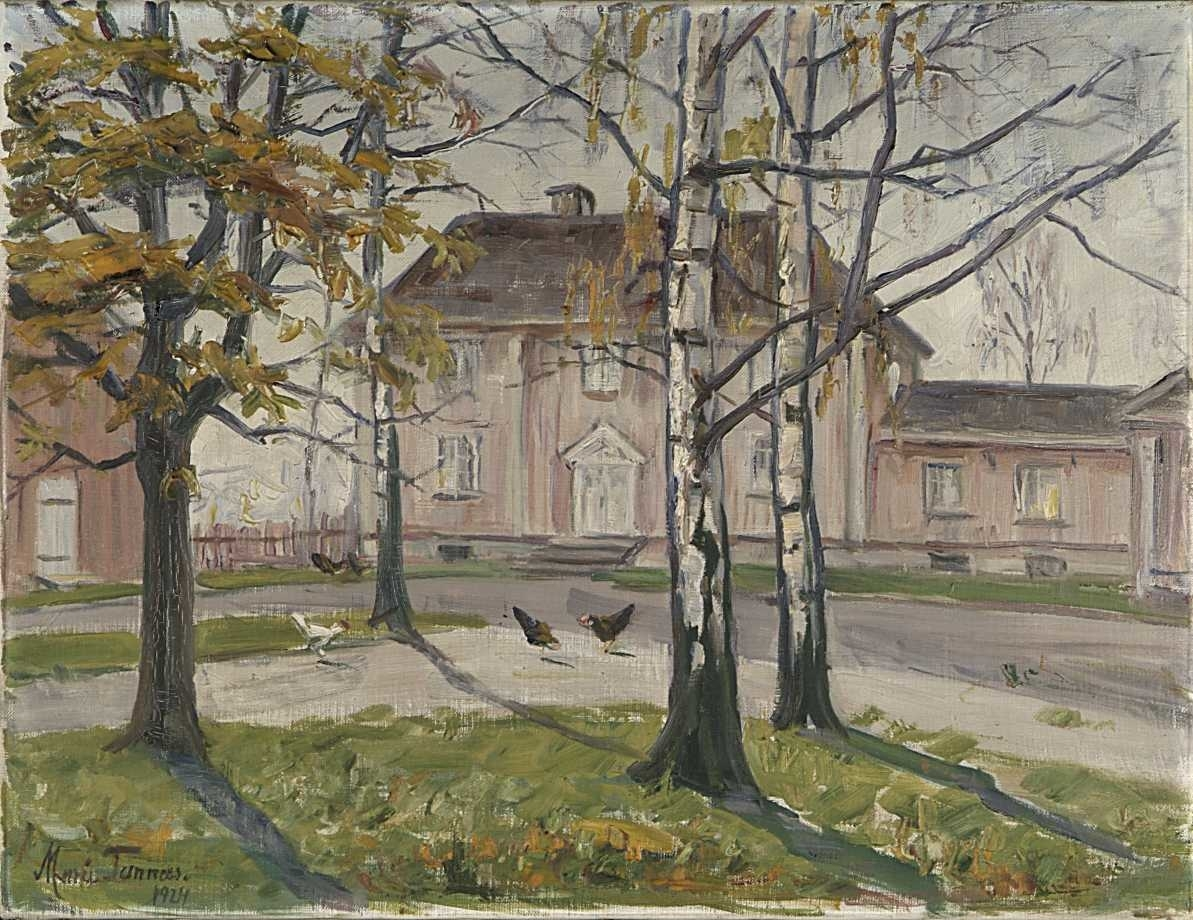
Vøyenvollen, 1924 Oslo Museum
