= Julie Skarland =

Norwegian artist and fashion designer

Julie Skarland (born 1960) is a Norwegian visual artist who has specialized in women's fashion design since the early 1990s. One of the Norwegians to have made a success of working abroad in fashion, she first established herself in Paris with her Julie Skarland Princess-factory in 1991, opening her own shop in 1998. In 2005, she moved to New Delhi, producing new designs in an adventurous folklore-inspired style. After spending almost 30 years abroad she returned to Norway in 2017.

== Biography ==
Born in Trondheim in 1960, she followed in her father's footsteps, studying architecture until one of her teachers complimented her on the dress she had made for herself, wondering why she did not want to study fashion design. As a result, she abandoned her architecture studies in 1983 and took up design, tailoring and dressmaking. In 1987, she moved to Paris to study fashion design at the avant garde Studio Berçot.

After she completed her studies in 1989, she began to design her own clothes. Her innovative designs produced a new look based on coarse contrasting materials inspired by the textile traditions of Norway. Her light, romantic collections were widely featured in the major fashion magazines and presented at shows in New York, Tokyo and Milan.

In 2005 she moved to India where she was able to have her designs tailored by local craftsmen on the basis of the fair trade principle. She developed increasingly into a textile artist and was able to overcome most of the stress she had experienced in Paris where she had had to produce four new collections each year.

After spending 10 years in India she returned to Norway where she began to make use of far more colour in her designs, in contrast to the mainly white garments she had produced in India. Her more recent designs have been inspired above all by animals and nature.

== Exhibitions ==
In addition to several group exhibitions since the 1990s in France, Norway, India and Germany, her designs have been shown at a number of solo exhibitions in Norway, the most important of which have been Alice in Hindustan (2010) at the Nordenfjeldske Kunstindustrimuseum in Trondheim, Paris - New Delhi - Oslo (2014) at the Norwegian Museum of Decorative Arts and Design in Oslo, and In my Gardem (2017) at the Kunstbanken Hedmark Kunstsenter in Hamar.

== Awards ==
In 2003, Skarland was awarded the "Designer of the year" prize at the Oslo Fashion Awards and in 2006, she received the annual culture award from the Municipality of Trondheim.
