= Borghild Arnesen =

Norwegian artist

Borghild Arnesen (1872–1950) was a Norwegian artist who is remembered in particular for her metal artworks. She studied painting first in Norway and then at the Académie Delécluse in Paris from 1895. After developing her metalwork skills under Armand Point, she exhibited in Paris and Oslo. Several of her religious and mythological reliefs are in the collection of Norway's National Museum.

== Biography ==
Born in Sarpsborg on 30 April 1872, Borghild Arnesen was the daughter of an organist. In 1892, she began her art education at the Tegneskole in Christiania (later Oslo), after which she spent a year studying painting at Harriet Backer and Asta Nørregaard's school. In 1895, she moved to Paris where she spent three years studying at the Académie Delécluse. While on a study trip to Rome in 1898, she became interested in metalwork. As a result, on her return to Paris she studied under the enamel artist Armand Point in Fontainbleau.

Arnesen most of the remainder of her career in France. She lived near Paris until around 1930 and then moved to Nice. It was thanks to her metalwork that she became known in Scandinavia and France. She created objects frequently made of silver-plated copper, decorated with flowers and animals. The works themselves extend from dishes, to jewellery, toiletries, frames and dishes, all created with great technical skill. Those exhibited in Stockholm's Thielska Gallery include a silverware coffee and tea service. She also created sacred art, including altarpieces. The church in Frogner contains her octagonal baptismal font in copper.

As for her paintings, her work was inspired by books on Mexican and Indian art as well as by the works of Rudyard Kipling and Hans Christian Andersen. The reliefs in the National Museum reflect her interest in religion and mythology. They include Christ and the Immortal Pilgrim depicting Christ's baptism in the River Jordan while her Black Magic of Estiurl is inspired by Indian art and the Buddha.

Borghild Arnesen died in Oslo on 2 September 1950.
