= Anne Kristine Thorsby =

Norwegian artist (born 1962)

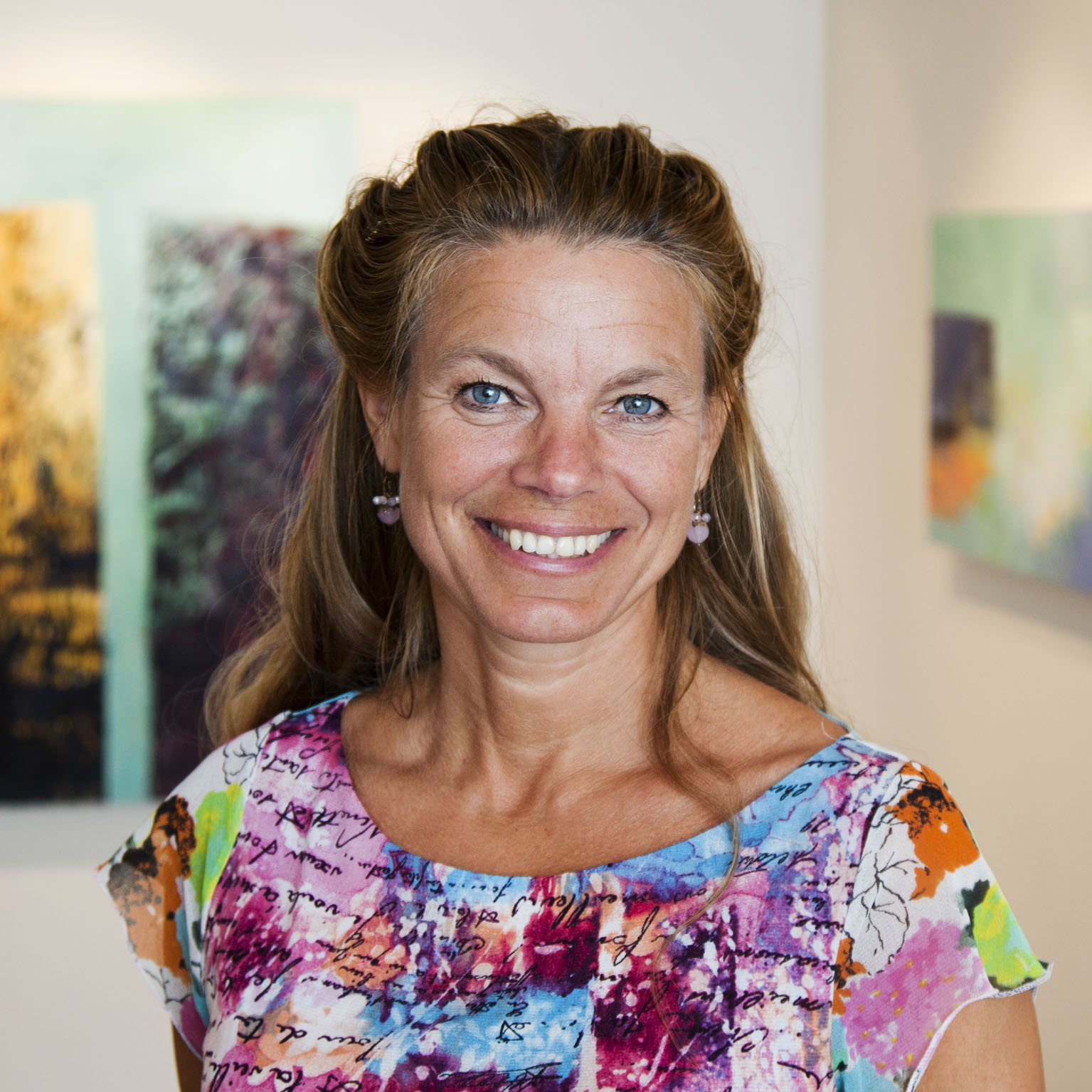
Anne Thorsby

Anne Kristine Thorsby (born 13 May 1962 in Oslo) is a Norwegian visual artist, living in Lillehammer.

== Life ==
Thorsby was born in 1960 in Oslo.

She graduated from the Art Academy in Oslo in 1989. She debuted in 1988 with the participation of Østlandsutstillingen and a solo exhibition at the Lillehammer Art Association of 1991. She has had over 30 solo exhibitions and commissions at several galleries. She lives in Lillehammer.
