= Charlotte Block Hellum =

German-born Norwegian ceramist and enamel artist

Charlotte Block Hellum née Stöckel (1911–2005) was a German-born Norwegian ceramist and enamel artist. After completing her studies in Germany, she moved to Norway where she established a ceramics workshop in 1947 and exhibited at the Autumn Exhibition in 1950. From the mid-1960s, she worked exclusively as an enameller, decorating copper dishes, bowls and vases with both figurative and non-figurative designs. In 1975, Hellum was honoured with Norway's most significant craft award, the Jacob Prize.

== Early life ==
Born in Görlitz, Germany, on 14 April 1911, Charlotte Stöckel was the daughter of Fritz Stöckel and his wife Martha née Engel. She studied ceramics at the Arts and Crafts Schools (Kunstgewerbeschulen) of Dresden and Berlin, graduating in 1936. After arriving in Norway, she married Andreas Block Hellum. Together they had a son, Johannes Block Hellum (born 1938), now a silversmith, sculptor and painter.

== Career ==
In 1947, Hellum established her own workshop where she initially practised as a ceramist. She made her debut at Oslo's Autumn Exhibition in 1950 with her ceramic piece Gutt med fisk (Boy with Fish). For a number of years she experimented with the enamelling of copper but continued to work as a ceramist. From the mid-1960s, she worked exclusively as an enameller, frequently embedding gold or silver foil under transparent enamel. Her works are decorated with both non-figurative and figurative designs, the latter often inspired by nature. Her initial use of strong, mixed colours evolved in the late 1970s to mainly shades of black, white and grey. While above all she created dishes, bowls and vases, she continued to present sculptural pieces when exhibiting.

Thanks to a study grant, she was able to visit Mexico in 1970 and spent time in Rome in 1971. In 1980, she visited Egypt. In addition to collective and solo exhibitions in Norway, her works have been included in Scandinavian exhibitions in Japan (1978) and the United States (1982).

Hellum's works are in the collections of Norway's National Museum, Permanenten and the Nordenfjeldske Kunstindustrimuseum in Trondheim.

Charlotte Block Hellum died on 26 June 2005, aged 94.

== Awards ==
In 1975, Hellum was honoured with Norway's annual craft award, the Jacob Prize.
