= Birger Dahl =

Norwegian industrial designer (1916–1998)

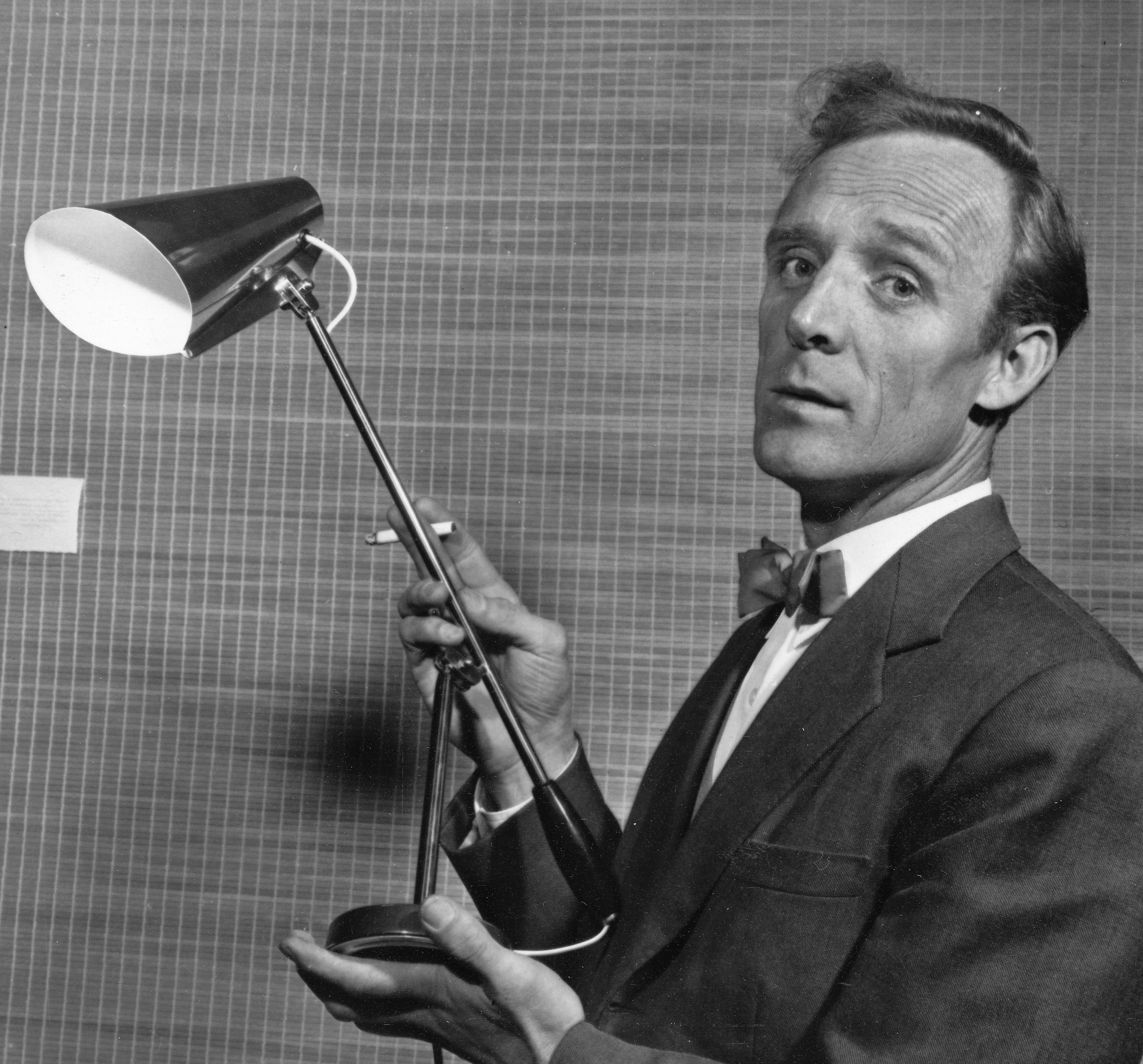
- Born: 24 November 1916; Moss
- Died: 12 August 1998 (aged 81); Oslo
- Occupations: Interior architect, industrial designer

Birger Dahl (24 November 1916 – 12 August 1998) was a Norwegian interior architect and industrial designer, regarded as one of the country's foremost industrial designers between 1950 and 1970. He is best known for his lighting designs for the manufacturer Sønnico, two of which won gold medals at the 1954 Milan Triennial and are again in production today under the names Birdy and Dokka. He also designed wallpaper, door handles, and household products, taught at the National College of Art and Design, and helped found the Norwegian interior architects' association. He received the Jacob Prize in 1968.
