= Eline McGeorge =

Norwegian artist

Eline McGeorge (born 1970 in Asker) is a Norwegian artist living and working in Oslo, Norway. She exhibits extensively in Norway and internationally.

== Biography ==
McGeorge received her Master of Fine Arts in 2000 from Goldsmiths, University of London in London UK.

She takes use of drawing, animation, collage, artist books and weaving. Her work spans abstraction, concrete references and documentary with democratic problems, environmental issues, feminist legacy and science fiction as core thematic focuses.

In her latest series to be part to be many, McGeorge explores the complex dynamics between humans and nature in an era where the impact of human activity on the environment is increasingly evident. Influenced by science-fiction, feminist heritage, and self-organisation as strategy, McGeorge’s work investigates democratic processes and environmental concerns. Watercolors from her sketchbooks capture her first-hand encounters with diverse environments, including a vast coal mining landscape in Colombia, indigenous succulents growing in diamond-mined sand in Namibia, lichen species adapted to heavy metal runoff from mines in Røros, and bird cliffs in Northern Norway.

McGeorge is represented by the galleries Hollybush Gardens, London since 2005 and Femtensesse, Oslo since 2024.

== Solo exhibitions ==
- Liste Art Fair Basel, Eline McGeorge (2025)
- Kunstnerforbundet, Oslo, to be part to be many (2024)
- Oslo Kunstforening, Oslo (2016)
- Hollybush Gardens, London (2012)
- Galleri Kirkhoff, Copenhagen (2008)
- Fotogalleriet, Oslo (2007)

== Selected group exhibitions ==
- Centre Georges Pompidou, Paris (2017)
- Dr. Bhau Daji Lad Museum, Mumbai (2015)
- Henie Onstad Kunstsenter, Oslo (2014)
- David Risley Gallery, Copenhagen (2012–13)
- Focus Frieze Art Fair, London (2012)
- Momentum (Moss), Moss (2009)
- B Hotel at the Museum of Modern Art PS1 New York in 2009.

== Collections ==
McGeorge's work is included in the permanent collection of the Limerick City Gallery of Art and the Zabludowicz Collection. She is also in the permanent collection of the Barcelona Museum of Contemporary Art.
