= Gro Jessen =

Norwegian textile artist

Gro Jessen (1938–2003) was a Norwegian textile artist. One of her country's most significant contributors to textile art in the second half of the 20th century, she also taught at the Norwegian National Academy of Craft and Art Industry and was active in a number of craft organizations including Norske Kunsthåndverkere. From the 1980s, her works were increasingly decorative as she experimented with new techniques and a variety of fabrics. Several of her creations are in the permanent collection of Norway's National Museum. Jessen has received a number of prizes, including the Norske Kunsthåndverkere's Honorary Award in 2003.

== Early life and family ==
Born in Brunlanes Municipality on 28 May 1938, Gro Jessen was the daughter of Mary Jessen (1899–1998) and the forest manager Hans Austeen (1897–1971). She matriculated from the secondary school in Larvik in 1955 and studied textile art at the Academy of Craft and Art Industry in Oslo, graduating in 1962. In 1964, she gained practical experience working with the Danish textile artist Ruth Christensen. In 1962, she married the painter Arne Sørensen (born 1937). The marriage was dissolved in 1965. In 1968, she married the writer Halvor Roll (1929–2008). The marriage was dissolved in 1977.

== Career ==
Jessen first worked from 1964 as a craftswoman and designer with the crafts organization PLUS in Fredrikstad but left after about a year. Together with Turid Holter (1936–1911), she opened her own workshop in the Oslo Bazaars, producing fabrics for clothing, tablecloths and curtains. In 1969, she presented her work at Landsforbundet Norsk Brukskunst in her first solo exhibition.

By the 1980s, she moved on to increasingly decorative works as she experimented with new techniques, striving to optimize the properties of different fabrics. While she worked principally with printing, she also employed other techniques such as creping and etching.

Jessen spent two periods of teaching at the Academy of Craft and Art Industry, first from 1973 to 1978, and later from 1993 to 1995. In the late 1990s, she also served as a replacement lecturer at the Bergen Academy of Art and Design.

== Awards ==
In 1994, for her creation Solflekker og svarte hull she was awarded Kunsthåndverkprisen (craftsman's prize) and in 2000 she received the Norske kunsthåndverkere Honorary Award.
