= Vilna Jorgen Morpurgo =

Norwegian artist, sculptor (1900–1975)

Vilna Jorgen Morpurgo (born Adele Vilhelma Ludvikke Larsen Nilsen, 10 June 1900 in Oslo; died 7 November 1975 in Sag Harbor) was a Scandinavian-American painter and sculptor. She represented Norway in both the 1939 New York World's Fair and the first art exhibition of the United Nations 1944 at the Argent Gallery in New York City, as well as the second United Nations Exhibit in 1947. In the 1930s she defied both Hitler and Mussolini who had commissioned her to do a commemorative sculpture. Residing in Sag Harbor, she, as well as both her artistic daughters, are featured in the local house tour circuit

== Biography ==
Morpurgo was married to Erling Jorgen-Orme until his death from TB in 1930, bearing a posthumous son, Erling Jorgensen I, adopted by his grandparents. In 1933 she married Baron Attilio Giacomo Morpurgo, MD, and remained married until her death. (Attilio's mother, Ida Olga DeCastro-Sierra Morpurgo was born on Staten Island, New York, USA and thanks in part to playwright Lillian Hellman, the family was able to escape the Holocaust and repatriate in 1940.) Vilna bore Attilio two daughters, Annaselma (1934) and Helga (1935) Annaselma (a/k/a Annselm L.N.V. Morpurgo), also notable since the 1950s as human rights activist Artemis Smith, received a 2018 Marquis Who's Who Lifetime Achievement Award and has authored many books and memoirs. Helga is known under the pen names of Christine Stanley and Vania Morpurgo; she was a student of Lillian Hellman and is a recipient of multiple awards in the arts.

In the 1920s-30s, Vilna Jorgen's works were acquired by many Royal Collections (Denmark, Belgium, Sweden, Italy), as well as the Moscow Art Museum. In Oslo she interviewed Trotsky. In Rome she sculpted a portrait of later-Partisan Hero/Martyr Dr. Luigi Pierantoni. Both Pierantoni and Enrico Fermi were close friends and colleagues of her husband Attilio.

In the 1940s–1960s, Morpurgo's New York City Galleries included Roko Gallery and Ligoa Duncan Galerie des Arts, as well as Ligoa's connection to her father's Raymond Duncan Museum on the Paris West Bank which awarded Morpurgo a 1962 "prix de paris". (Morpurgo also did a portrait of Raymond Duncan, as well as one of "An American Lady" reputed to be Lillian Hellman.)

Some of Morpurgo's works are in the Vesterheim Norwegian-American Museum, as well as Akim Historielag in Norway.
