= Birgit Wessel =

Birgit Hanna Maria Wessel also Birgit Mattsson Wessel (1911–2000) was a Norwegian textile artist. In 1937 she established a weaving studio in Oslo and the following year, together with her husband Bjarne Eugen Wessel, opened Vakkre Hjem, a store where many of their fabrics were sold. She designed curtains, furniture fabrics, tablecloths and carpets to be produced by Norway's leading textile factories. Her textiles were used for several major decoration projects, including the royal yacht K/S Norge (1948) and Oslo City Hall (1950). In 1959, Wessel received the Norwegian craft award, the Jacob Prize.

== Early life ==
Born in Stockholm on 10 October 1911, Birgit Hanna Maria was the daughter of Carin Mattsson and K. Hilmer, a civil engineer. From 1932 to 1937, she studied at Konstfack in Stockholm under the Swedish textile artist Annie Frykholm (1872–1955). During her studies, she gained practical experience in Båstad with the Swedish textile artist Märta Måås-Fjetterström (1873–1941). In 1936, she married the interior designer Bjarne Eugen Wessel. Together they had a daughter, Carin Erikka (1944), who also became a textile artist.

== Career ==
On graduating, Wessel moved to Norway in 1937 and established a weaving studio in Oslo. In 1939, it was relocated to central premised on Hausmanns Gate. In 1938, together with her husband, the interior architect and furniture designer Bjarne Wessel, she opened an arts and crafts shop on Tordenskjolds Gate known as Vakre Hjem (Beautiful Home). Her employees produced furniture fabrics on semi-automatic looms from Sweden while she designed patterns for curtains, carpets and tablecloths in a variety of natural and synthetic fibres including wool, cotton, linnen and even reeds. Some of these were produced in her studio but from the 1950s most were produced by a variety of textile factories, including Solberg Spinderi, Røros Tweed and Haldens Bomuldsspinderi og Væveri.

Wessel was particularly innovative in her use of colour, especially for curtains which were produced in a large variety of bright colours with white broken stripes. For her carpets, she experimented with new binding techniques using wool from spælsau sheep in order to obtain increased elasticity and durability. She also made used of the wool for seating upholstery on ships and planes.

Leading assignments have included textiles for decorating the royal yacht Norge (1948), Oslo City Hall (1950), the Security Council chamber at the UN Headquarters in New York (1951) and Norway's NATO embassy in Paris (1954). Her works been widely exhibited at home and abroad and can, for example, be seen in the National Museum of Art, Architecture and Design, Oslo, and in the Victoria and Albert Museum, London.

Birgit Wessel died in Oslo on 26 October 2000.

== Awards ==
In 1959, Wessel received the Jacob Prize, a Norwegian craft award. In 1970, her "Bukett" woven curtain designed for Halden received the Mark for Good Design.
