= Christian Albrecht Jackhelln =

Norwegian merchant and politician

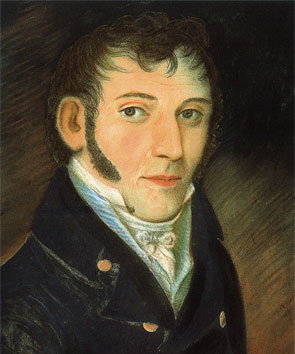
Christian Albrecht Jackhelln

Christian Albrecht Jackhelln (28 July 1784 – 11 September 1868) was a Danish born, Norwegian merchant and politician.

== Biography ==
Christian was born in Aalborg, Denmark to Anton Heinrich von Jackhelln and Pauline Sofie Jegind. He settled in the parish of Bodin in Nordland, Norway where he established his own trading company, Christian Jakhelln AS. His company became one of the leading wholesaler and trade companies in Bodin from 1816 until his death in 1868. The firm was taken over by his son Carl Johan (1827–1902), and later by his grandson Christian Albrecht Jakhelln (1863–1945).

Jackhelln was a member of the first City Council and was elected to the Norwegian Parliament in 1833 from the constituency of Nordlands Amt. He was later re-elected in 1845 and 1851.

== Personal life ==
In 1816 he married Anne Fredrikke Winther (1796–1858), daughter of the district surgeon Johan Friederich Winter and his first wife Anne Margrethe Woche. They had 11 children.
