= Odd Hølaas =

Norwegian writer and journalist

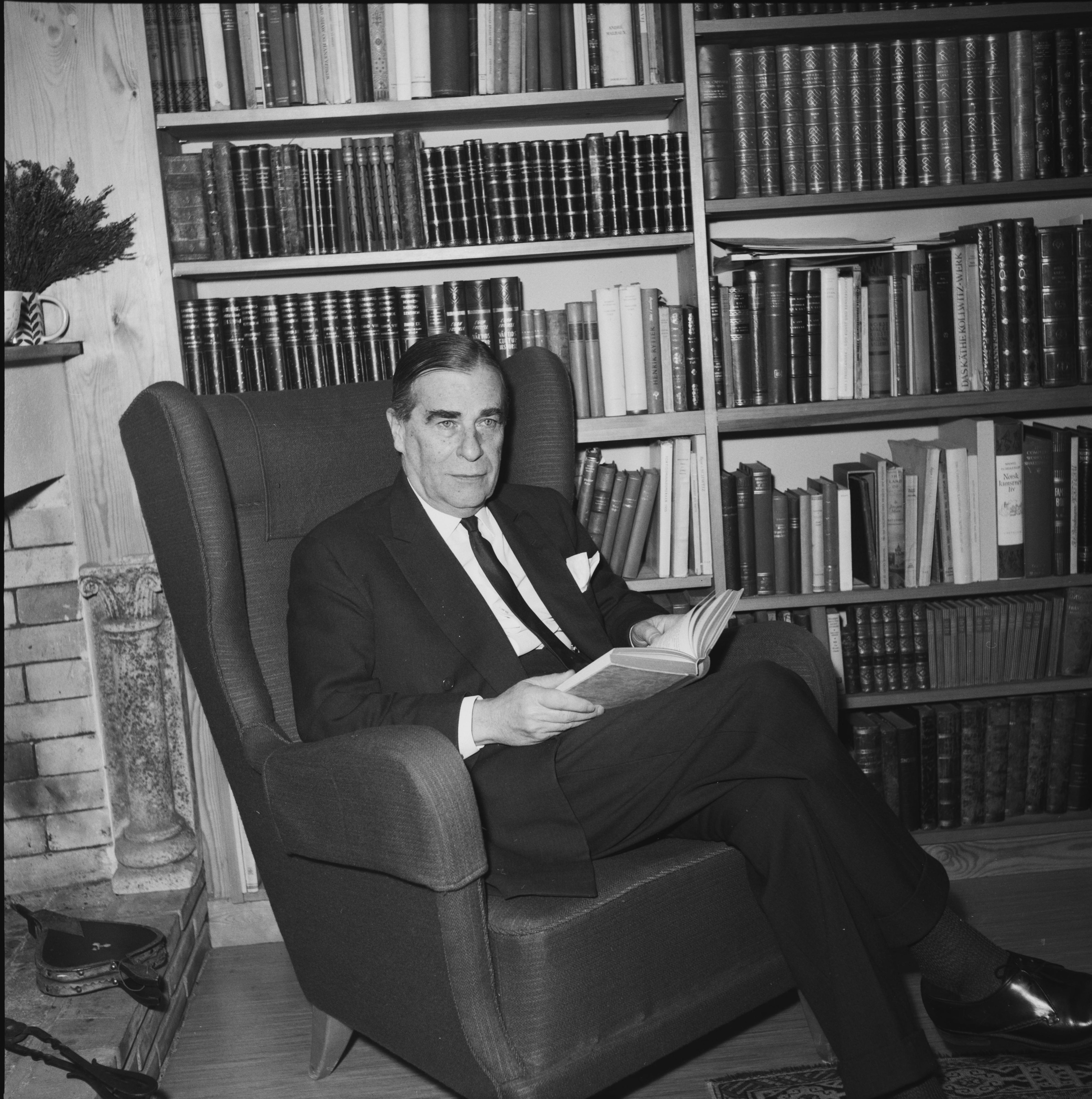
Odd Hølaas.jpg

Oddleiv Sigurd Bang Hølaas (27 March 1898 – 2 March 1968) was a Norwegian journalist and writer. He won the Riksmål Society Literature Prize in 1964.

He was born in Tveit as a son of physician Oddleiv Magne Hølaas (1869–1915) and Aasta Bang (1867–1953). He was a paternal grandson of Andreas Hølaas. He finished secondary education in 1917, and was hired in the newspaper Christianssands Tidende. Already in 1918 he went on to Nationen, and in 1924 to Tidens Tegn. In July 1926 he married Kjellaug Skajaa (1906–1990).

He remained in Tidens Tegn until 1940. The newspaper was closed in 1941. This was during the occupation of Norway by Nazi Germany, and he was arrested on 12 May 1942. He was incarcerated in Bredtveit concentration camp until 24 September 1942. From 1946 to 1950 he was a Norwegian press attaché in Copenhagen, from 1951 to 1956 he was a culture attaché in Washington DC. From 1956 he worked in Dagbladet and also had a column in Aktuell. Hølaas also released several books; best remembered are the essay collections De talte dager (1946), Øyne som ser (1964) and Livstegn og speilinger (1966). In 1964 he won the Gyldendal's Endowment and the Riksmål Society Literature Prize.

Hølaas died in March 1968 in Oslo from myocardial infarction.
