= Karl Marenius Ivarsson =

Norwegian politician

- Born: 7 July 1867; Trondenes, Norway
- Died: 10 December 1922 (aged 55)
- Occupations: Schoolteacher, school administrator and politician

Karl Marenius Ivarsson (7 July 1867 – 10 December 1922) was a Norwegian schoolteacher, school administrator and politician.

He was born in Trondenes Municipality to fisherman Mathias Olai Iversen and Anne Kirstine Markussen. He was elected representative to the Storting for the period 1919–1921, for the Liberal Party. He served as mayor of Vardø Municipality from 1913 to 1916.
