= Suzanne Øgaard =

Norwegian artist (1918–2003)

Suzanne Øgaard (7 July 1918 – 18 February 2003) was a French-born Norwegian painter.

== Biography ==
Øgaard grew up in Paris and met a Norwegian citizen there, married, and moved to Norway in 1939. During World War II, she studied at Norwegian National Academy of Fine Arts, while her husband was in exile because of resistance towards the occupying Germans. After the war, she studied under André Lhote in Paris for a while. Her first exhibition was at Høstutstillingen in 1958. She also held other exhibitions in Norway, New York City (three times), and Paris (three times). In the course of her career, she switched from painting to graphics and then to aquarels. She is represented in the National Museum of Art, Architecture and Design. She died in early 2003.
