= Elise Jakhelln =

Norwegian textile designer (1909–2002)

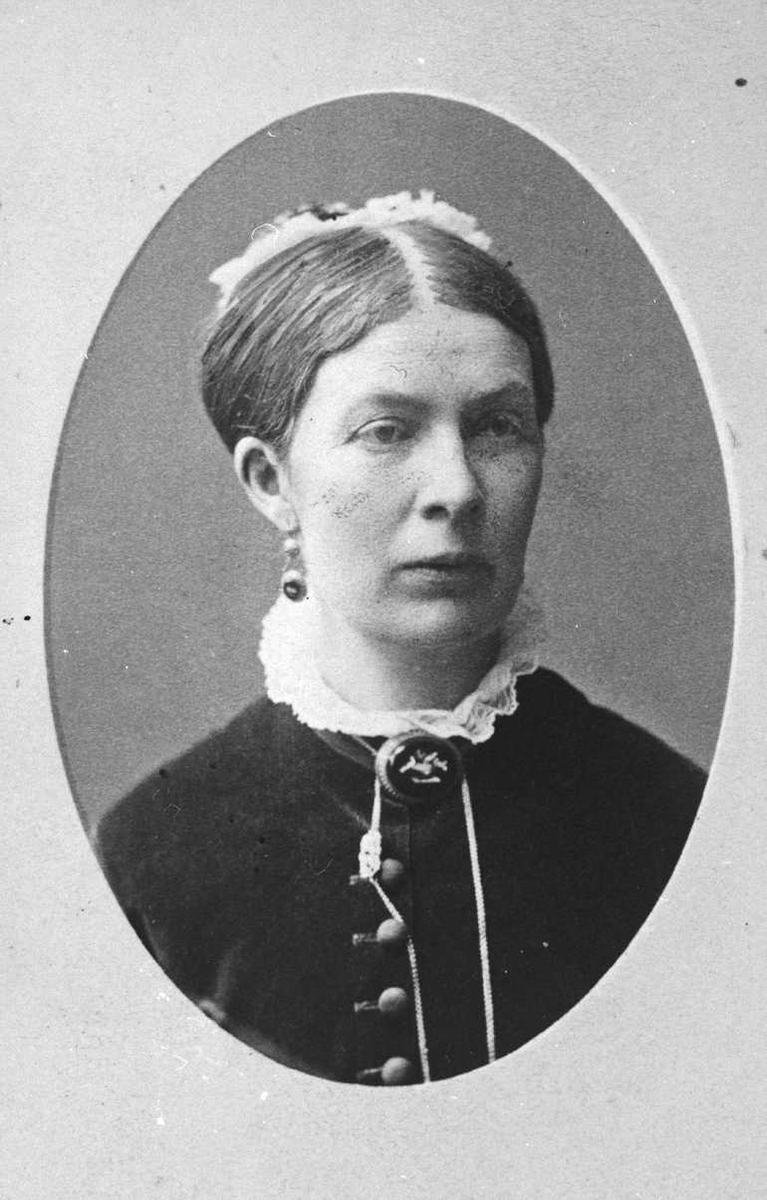

Anne Elise Jakhelln (12 September 1909 – 19 August 2002) was a Norwegian textile artist. She is remembered above all for her hand-woven curtains and upholstery. Together with Gusse Bade, in 1935 she established a weaving studio in Oslo which later moved to larger premises in nearby Lysaker. From the mid-1940s, she collaborated with Norway's leading furniture manufacturers and interior designers, producing fabrics for homes, hotels and ocean liners. By the mid-1960s, with ten employees and some 500 patterns, her studio was producing curtains on semi-automatic looms. Jakelln received the Jacob Prize, a Norwegian cultural award, in 1958. She retired in 1985. Residing at Lysaker, she died in 2002.

== Early life ==
Born in Bodø on 12 September 1909, Anne Elise Jakhelln was the daughter of the politician Christian Albrecht Jakhelln (1863–1945) and his wife Anna Sofie née Bachke (1871–1954), a painter. From 1928 to 1930, she attended the women's art industry school in Oslo, Statens Kvinnelige Industriskole, specializing in textile pattern drawing. She served an apprenticeship with the handicrafts firm Husfliden in 1930. In 1931, she spent a year as resident at Konstfack in Stockholm.

== Career ==
From 1932 to 1934, Jakhelln spent a lengthy period in Bilbao, Spain, working in Somme's weaving studio. On returning to Norway, together with Gusse Bade (who soon left), she established a weaving studio in Oslo where handwoven woolen fabrics were produced. From 1936, she participated in collective exhibitions at Oslo's Håndverkeren. In the mid-1940s. she used a combination of wool, linen and cotton to produce upholstery and curtains. Thanks to connections with the furniture designer and interior designer Bjørn Janke, she received commissions for producing fabrics for private homes, hotels, ocean liners and Norwegian embassies.

As orders came in from leading furniture producers such as Hiorth og Østlyngen and A. Huseby & Co., the studio had ten employees in the 1960s and was producing curtains on semi-automatic looms from some 500 different patters. In 1985, Jakhellin retired, allowing her weaver Anne Størseth to take over the studio.

Elise Jakhelln died on 19 August 2002 in Bærum Municipality.

== Awards ==
In 1958, Jakelln received the Jacob Prize, a Norwegian cultural award.
