= Liv Blåvarp =

Norwegian artist and jewelry designer

Liv Blåvarp (born 1956) is a Norwegian artisan who is known for her jewellery, especially her beautifully sculptured, spirally-shaped necklaces and bracelets consisting of small pieces of wood. Since the mid-1990s, Blåvarp has gained international recognition for her creations and is now represented in the leading art museums of Scandinavia and North America. She has received a series of awards, including Norway's Jacob Prize in 1997, the Bavarian State Award from Munich's international crafts exhibition in 2012 and Sweden's Prince Eugen Medal in 2003.

== Early life ==
Born in Østre Toten Municipality in south-east Norway, Liv Blåvarp studied at Norway's State College of Art and Design where she graduated in metalwork in 1983. She went on to spend a year at London's Royal College of Art, returning to Norway in 1884.

== Career ==
On returning to Oslo, Blåvarp joined the other metalwork graduates from the State College of Art in a group they called TRIKK. In 1986, she moved back to her native Lena in Østre Toten Municipality where she was able to find a suitable studio. While she had earlier focused on metalwork, she quickly turned to wood as she found that unlike metal it presented opportunities for sculpturing necklaces which could please the wearer. She has developed her interest in wood ever since. Explaining her choice of wood in connection with her prize-winning Red Drop, she explained: "The most significant aspect is that it allows me to work with larger volumes without them becoming too heavy. At the same time, wood is that material which best allows me to create the expression I want."

Although her basic material is wood of various types, Blåvarp has enhanced some of her pieces with bone such as ivory and whale teeth. She has also created works to be displayed in the public space, for example in Hedmark's hospital and Lillemark Railway Station.

Liv Blåvarp is represented in museums in Norway and beyond, including Norway's National Museum of Art, Architecture and Design, Denmark's Designmuseum, Sweden's Nationalmuseum, Germany's Museum Angewandte Kunst, the National Museum of Scotland, the Los Angeles County Museum of Art, the Museum of Fine Arts, Boston, and the Montreal Museum of Fine Arts.

== Awards and honors ==
Among Blåvarp's many awards are the Nordic Torsten and Wanja Söderberg Prize (1995), the Norwegian Jacob Prize for crafts (1997), Sweden's Prince Eugen Medal (2003), and the Bavarian State Prize, Munich (2012).
