= Norwegian Design and Architecture Centre =

Former Norwegian foundation

Norwegian Design Council
- Type: Foundation
- Founded: 1963
- Defunct: 14 June 2014
- Headquarters: Oslo, Norway
- Area served: Norway
- Number of employees: 14 (2007)
- Parent: Norwegian Ministry of Trade and Industry
- Website: www.norskdesign.no

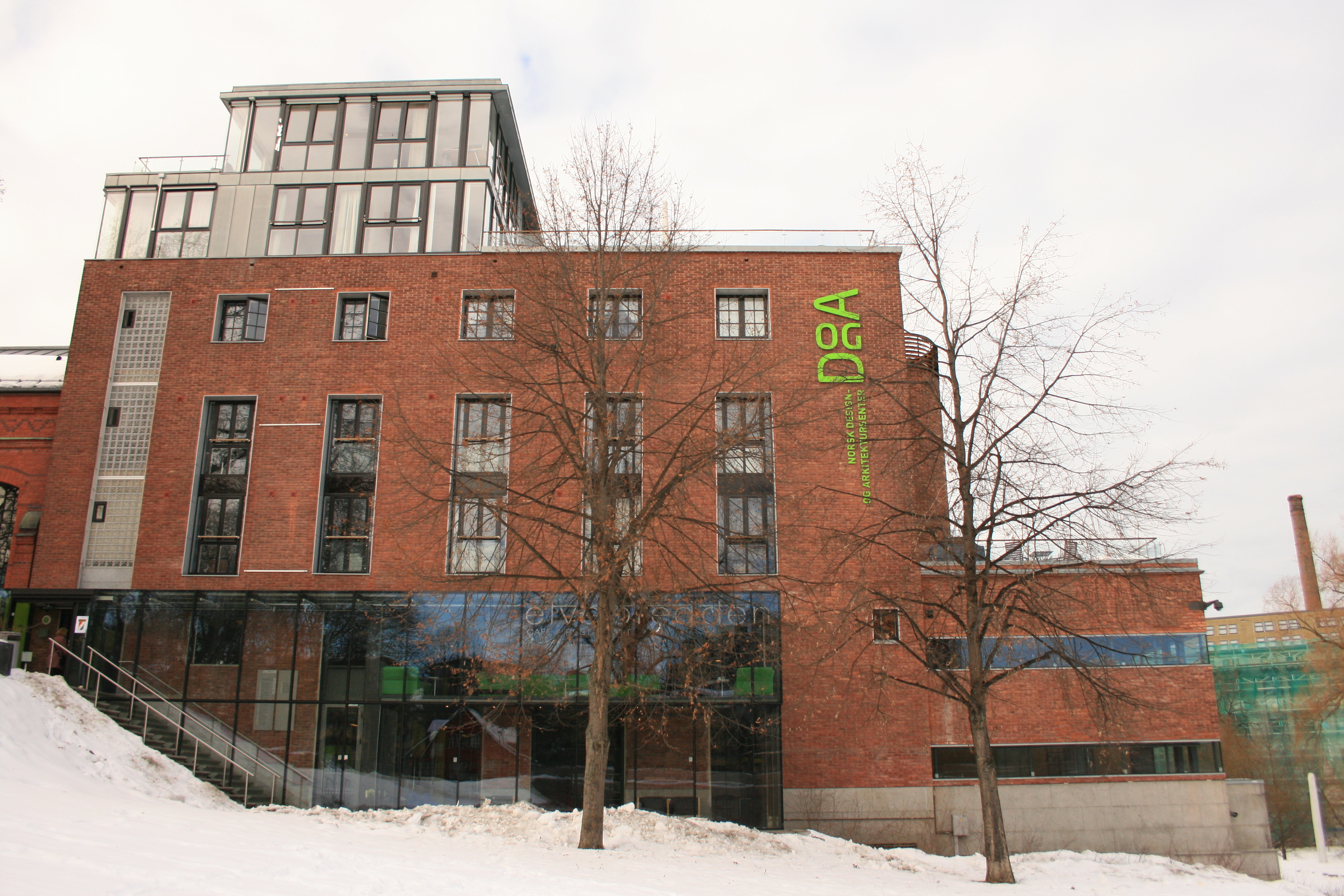
Norwegian Design and Architecture at Hausmanns gate in Oslo

Norwegian Design Council (Norwegian: Norsk Designråd) was a Norwegian state-controlled foundation that encouraged good design of Norwegian products as a key to improved innovation and the products international reputation and sales.

Among the activities of the Norwegian Design Council were awarding the Merket for God Design and Design Effekt awards. It also cooperated closely with Innovation Norway concerning new ventures. The council worked as a competence centre and was funded by the Norwegian Ministry of Trade and Industry, through consulting and through other projects.

The Norwegian Design Council was founded in 1963 by the Norwegian Export Council and the Confederation of Norwegian Enterprise. In 2014, the Norwegian Design and Architecture Centre (Norsk design- og arkitektursenter) was established as a fusion of the Norwegian Design Council with the Norwegian Form (Norsk Form), a national institution working in the fields of design, architecture, and urban development. The combined entity is housed in two renovated industrial buildings by the Aker River on Hausmanns gate in Oslo.

== See also ==
- Scandinavian design
