= Ingrid Lønningdal =

Norwegian artist (born 1981)

Ingrid Lønningdal (born February 13, 1981, in Bergen) is a Norwegian artist. She was raised in Lier and lives and works in Oslo.

== Biography ==
Lønningdal holds a master's degree from the Oslo National Academy of the Arts. She works within a broad spectrum of techniques in her artistic practice, which are often set in architectural and urban developments.

In 2014 Lønningdal was awarded the Savings Bank Foundation DNB art stipend. In 2015 she published the book Borgen. Et sted for kulturproduksjon / A Place for Culture Production with the publishing house Teknisk Industri AS. The book documents the activity in Bispegata 12 in Oslo, popularly called Borgen, which in the period from 1993 to 2012 was one of Oslo's biggest studio and cultural co-working spaces.

From 2006, Lønningdal has been part of the artist group Institutt for Farge.

== Selected solo exhibitions ==
- Division of Space, Oslo Kunstforening, Oslo (2017)
- Essential Geometry, Nordnorsk Kunstnersenter, Svolvær (2013)
- This City Busy With Dreams, Kunstnerforbundet, Oslo (2011)
- Bauen - wohnen - denken, Tegnerforbundet, Oslo (2011)

== Selected group exhibitions ==
- En kollektiv psykogeografisk guide til Oslo, Tegnebiennalen, Oslo (2016)
- Kunsten tilhører dem som ser den, (collaboration with Steffen Håndlykken), Norsk Skulpturbiennale, Vigeland-museet, Oslo (2015)
- Sparebankstiftelsen DNBs stipendutstilling, Oslo Kunstforening, Oslo (2014)
- Inside Outside Architecture, National Museum of Art, Architecture and Design, Oslo (2013)
- Space Station, program #2 & #3, 0047, Oslo (2011)
- Zwischenraum : Space between, Kunstverein in Hamburg, Hamburg (2010)
