= Brit Fuglevaag =

Norwegian textile artist

Brit Haldis Fuglevaag (born 1939) is a Norwegian textile artist and educator who since the 1970s has been a leading contributor to Norwegian art. From 1964, she worked from her own studio in Oslo, creating wide interest in her expressive woven creations. Influenced by the art she has experienced in Poland and France and increasingly experimenting with form and colour, she uses a variety of materials for her woven works, everything from long-haired wool to plastic and newspaper. After retiring from teaching at the Norwegian National Academy of Craft and Art Industry in 1996, she moved to Paris but has now returned to Norway. Her works can be seen in a number of buildings in Oslo as well as in the National Museum and the Art Museum in Trondheim.

== Early life, education and family ==
Born in Kirkenes on 19 April 1939, Brit Haldis Fuglevaag is the daughter of the economist Ørnulf Fuglevaag (1907–63) and Haldis Marie née Karlsen (1912–39). As her mother died when she was born, she was adopted by her uncle, the travel agent Arnfinn Fuglevaag (1902–63), and his wife, Sofie née Moslet (1907–62), a nurse. Raised in Trondheim, she studied textile art at the Norwegian National Academy of Craft and Art Industry (1959–63) and, thanks to a scholarship, at the Academy of Fine Arts in Warsaw (1963–64) where she studied traditional tapestry weaving. She completed her education in Paris (1968–69). In 1964, she married the Polish painter Ryszard Warsinski (1937–1996) with whom she had a daughter, Maria (1965). The marriage was dissolved in 1979. In 1980, she married the lawyer Per Aavatsmark (1928–1990).

== Career ==
The year Fuglevaag spent in Poland was particularly significant for her career, not only because she saw how country treated textile art on a level with painting and sculpture but because it gave her ideas about the scope of textile expression.From 1964, she created works in her weaving workshop in Oslo, allowing her to exhibit at the Autumn Exhibition in 1965 with her non-figurative naturally coloured Komposisjon consisting of unevenly presented dark and light fields. Here 1970 work Form 1 in the National Gallery's collection shows the importance of space in her works, with its roughly woven technique combining sisal threads of various types: thick and thin, soft and stiff, flat and lush.

She has travelled widely, spending extensive periods in the Italian countryside and working in her Paris studio while visiting most other European countries. Her work has been inspired by the work of all the artists she has met during her travels.

After retiring from teaching at the Norwegian National Academy of Craft and Art Industry in 1996, she moved to Paris but has now returned to Norway. Her home is Oslo is filled with looms, tapestries, woolen works and other creations. Fuglevaag's works can be seen in a number of buildings in Oslo as well as in the National Museum and the Art Museum in Trondheim.
