= Bergen Academy of Art and Design =

Former university college in Bergen, Norway

Coordinates: 60°23′27.7″N 5°19′58.8″E

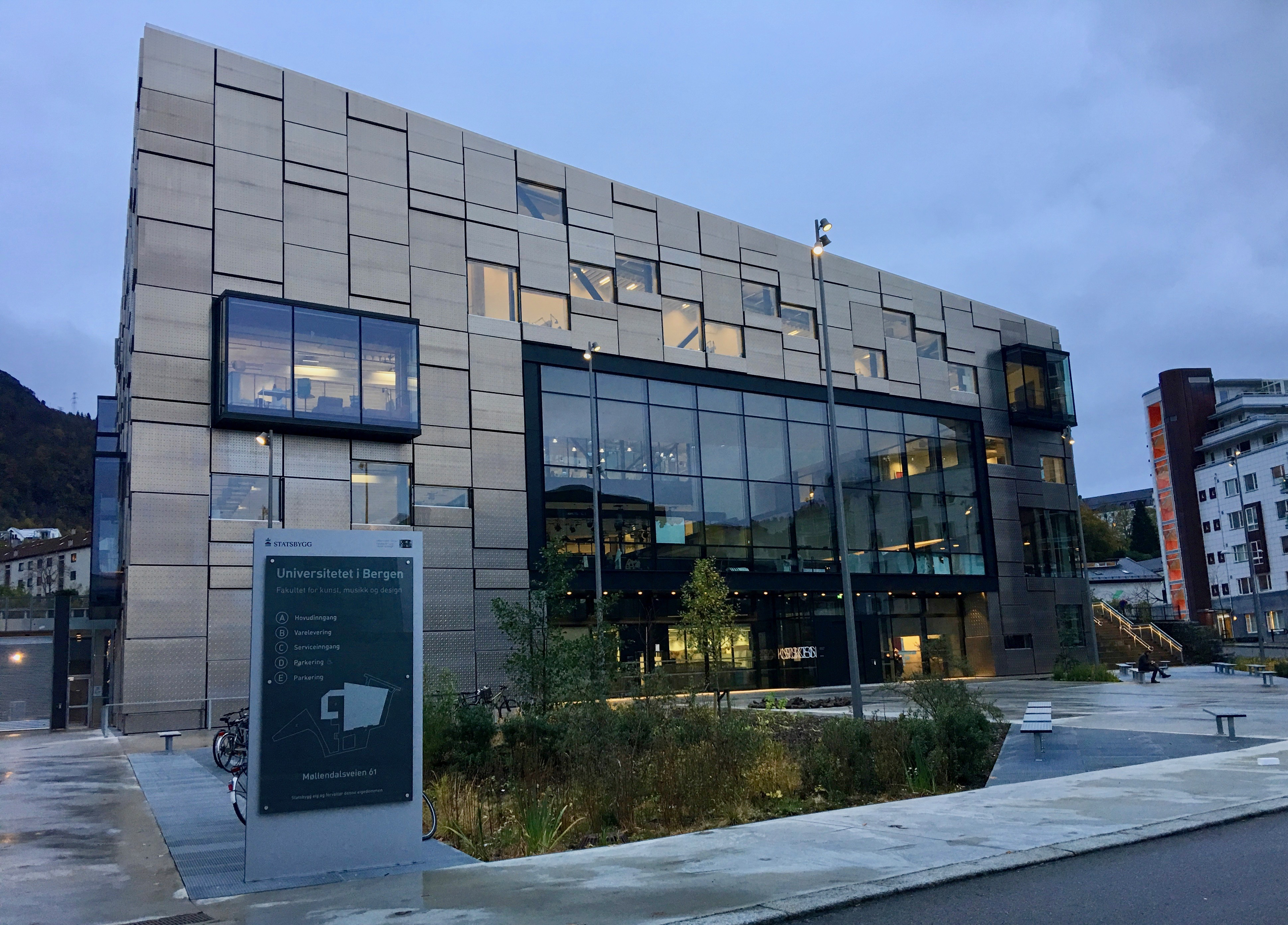
Faculty of Fine Art, Music and Design – Main Building Møllendalsveien 61

Bergen Academy of Art and Design (Norwegian: Kunst- og designhøgskolen i Bergen) or KHiB was one of two independent and accredited scientific institutions of higher learning in the visual arts and design in Norway (The other is Oslo National Academy of the Arts). It was located in Bergen, Norway. The education included the subject areas fine art, photography, printmaking, ceramics, textiles, visual communication, interior architecture and furniture design. The college had around 350 students.

KHiB is now merged with The Grieg Academy - Department of Music, and together they make up the Faculty of Fine Art, Music and Design, as one of seven faculties at University of Bergen (UiB). The faculty was formally established on 1 January 2017, and has three departments: The Art Academy - Department of Art, The Grieg Academy - Department of Music and Department of Design.

== History ==
Art education has long traditions in Bergen, as the first school of art was established there in 1772, modelled on the Academy of Art in Copenhagen. Bergen Academy of Art and Design was itself a young institution established in 1996, merged from two former institutions: Vestlandets kunstakademi, which had been founded in 1972, and Statens høgskole for kunsthåndverk og design, which dates to 1909.

The academy had facilities in six different buildings in Bergen centre: Strømgaten 1, Marken 37, Vaskerelven 8, Kong Oscars gate 62, and C. Sundts gate 53 and 55. Strømgaten 1, which previously housed Bergen Technical School, was protected by regulations on 25 June 2013. The building was designed by Giovanni Müller and built in the years 1874–76. In 2017, all facilities were co-located in Møllendalsveien in a new purpose-built building designed by Snøhetta.

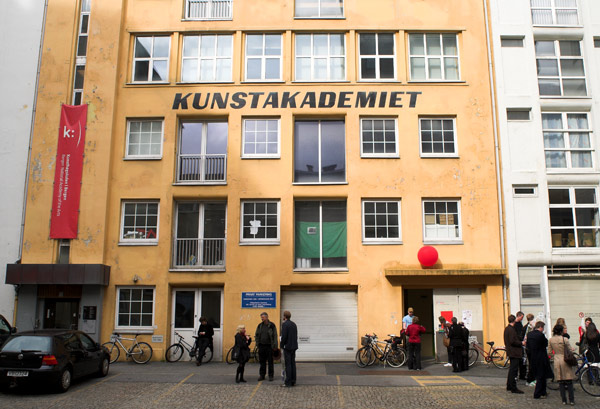
Department of Fine Art in C. Sundts gate in 2014.
