= Knut Monrad =

Norwegian painter

Knut Monrad (March 14, 1913 – June 23, 1987) was a Norwegian painter. He has been described as a nature poet that interpreted his experience of nature with rapid, broad brushstrokes. In addition to his activity as a painter, Monrad also worked as a translator of English and Swedish literature.

Monrad was born in Vestre Aker, the son of Hans Sundt Monrad and Astrid Haslum. He studied at the Norwegian National Academy of Craft and Art Industry under Karl Høgberg and at the Norwegian National Academy of Fine Arts under Jean Heiberg. During the Second World War he studied in Bjarne Engebret's painting school. He began his artistic path relatively late, and he consistently displayed subdued naturalistic expression. Landscapes drawn in broad strokes with a view across the land or sea were his main motif. He often used a limited range of color, with gray or blue-tinted coloring interspersed with green and gray shades. He participated in 42 exhibitions from 1952 to 1980. Among group exhibitions, he took part in the Autumn Exhibition eight times from 1947 to 1972, twice in the Southern Norway Exhibition (Sørlandsutstillingen, in 1972 and 1978), and once in the Eastern Norway Exhibition (Østlandsutstillingen, in 1979). He also participated in the Young Artists Society's anniversary exhibition (1975).

Monrad was part of the artists' colony that developed in Flosta Municipality after the Second World War. Together with artists such as Ferdinand Finne, Ellen Iden, Ivar Jerven, Kjerstin Øvrelid, Liv Nergaard, Finn Strømsted, Bodil Cappelen, and Finn Henrik Bodvin, an artistic environment was created that drew inspiration from nature and the skerries. Many of Monrad's motifs are drawn from impressions of nature in Flosta, Tromøy, and Ytre Møkkalasset Lighthouse.

Monrad was married twice, to Eva Eriksen and Live Hiorth. He died in Bærum Municipality.
