= Ellen Iden =

Norwegian artist (1897–1961)

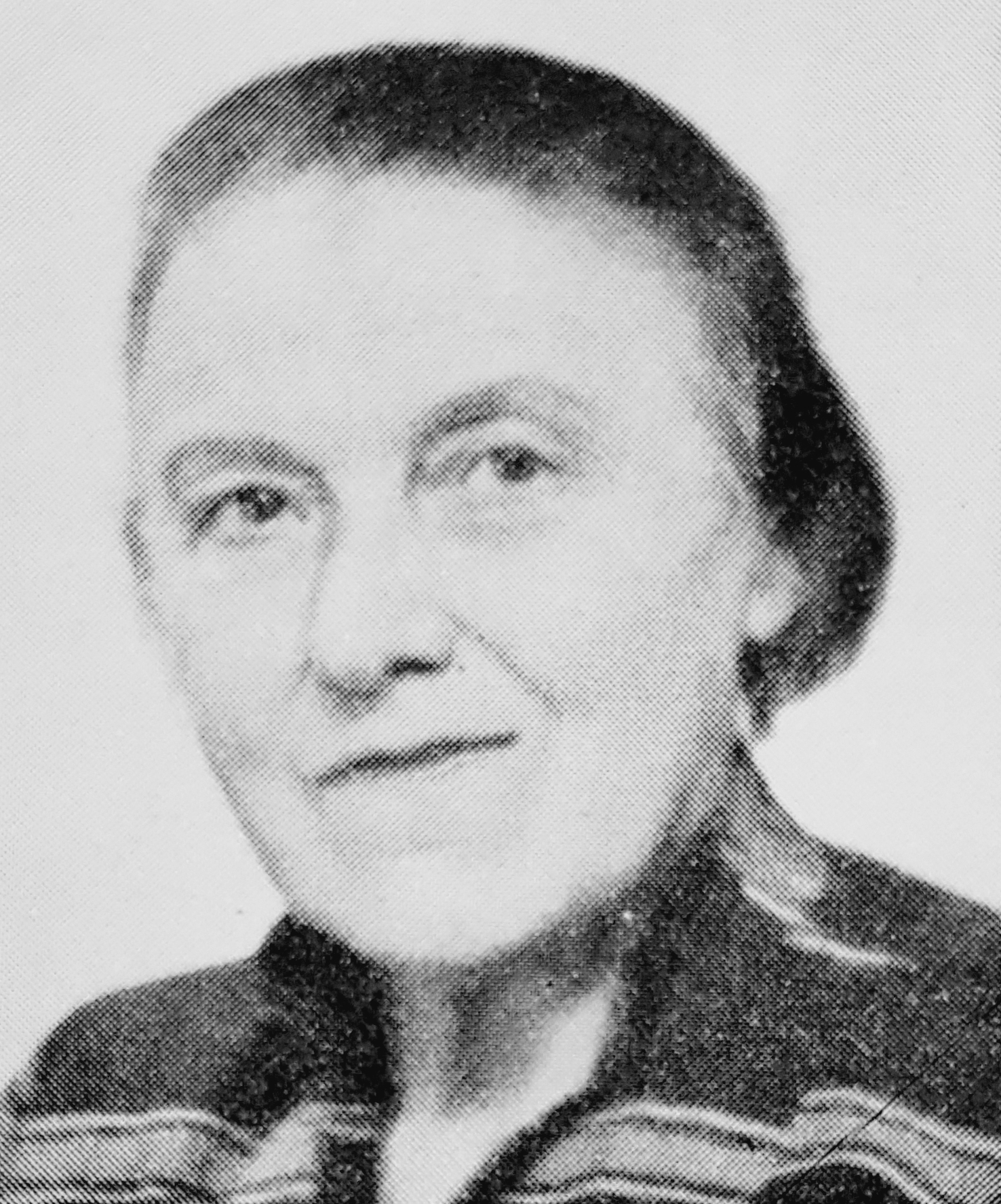
Ellen Iden

Ellen Nordan Lund Iden (January 24, 1897 – November 12, 1961) was a Norwegian painter known for her landscapes, pictures of flowers, interior paintings, and portraits using finely tuned coloring.

== Biography ==
Ellen Nordan Lund Iden was born in Kristiania (now Oslo), the daughter of Major Ivar Johannessen Lund (1861–1936) and the painter Jacobine Nordan Lund (1867–1941). She studied under Othon Friesz at the former Académie Moderne in Paris in 1920, and then at the Norwegian National Academy of Fine Arts under Axel Revold from 1931 to 1932. She also studied under Leon Aurdal.

She married the sculptor Johannes Iden in 1938, who died in the sinking of the M/S Ronda one year later. Her first solo exhibition coincided with a memorial exhibition for him, held at the Artists' Association Gallery (Kunstnerforbundet) in 1943. She achieved a major breakthrough in 1955 with a solo exhibition at the Oslo Art Association Gallery (Oslo Kunstforening). The exhibition was a traveling exhibition that was shown in several cities, and it received much attention in the press. Ellen Iden served as the first head of the Rogaland Art School (Studieatelieret i Stavanger), which was established as a workshop for those wishing to enter the Norwegian National Academy of Craft and Art Industry. During her active years as an artist, she took part in a number of exhibitions. She exhibited twelve times at the Autumn Exhibition (the last time posthumously in 1962). Her paintings Studie av Gertrud (A Study of Gertrud, 1960), Kobberfjellet (Copper Mountain, 1954–1955), and Bergknaus etter regn (Hilltop after the Rain, 1960) were purchased by the National Museum of Art, Architecture, and Design. The painting Oldemors blomster (Great-Grandmother's Flowers) was purchased by the Stavanger Art Gallery (Stavanger faste galleri).

In 1946, Iden purchased a summer home in Holmesund in Flosta Municipality (now part of Arendal Municipality). Iden was part of an artists' colony that developed in the postwar years in Flosta. Together with others, including Ivar Jerven, Kjerstin Øvrelid, Knut Monrad, Finn Strømsted, Bodil Cappelen, Finn Henrik Bodvin, and Liv Nergaard, an artistic environment was created that drew inspiration from nature and the skerries. A number of her landscape motifs draw upon this background. In a letter to Agnes Hiorth from her summer home in Holmesund, she wrote the following:

It is so beautiful here that it just takes my breath away. In the sea is glassy with a transparent cold blue color, and greenish-gray islets lie in rhythmic lines. Now and then you can see white clouds reflected in the glass-clear surface. And on my table there is a bouquet of rosebuds tied with a red stem. But there is so much that is tempting to paint that even at 10 in the morning I do not know where to begin.

Ellen Nordan Lund Iden died in Oslo.
