= Svein Magnus Håvarstein =

Norwegian sculptor and graphic artist

Svein Magnus Håvarstein (28 December 1942 – 18 January 2013) was a Norwegian sculptor and graphic artist.

== Biography ==
He was born in Rennesøy Municipality in Rogaland, Norway. He studied at the Norwegian National Academy of Fine Arts from 1962 to 1965 under Professor Per Palle Storm. He also attended the Norwegian National Academy of Craft and Art Industry in 1964 where he trained under Chrix Dahl. He debuted at the Western Norway Exhibition (Vestlandsutstillingen) in 1963. He participated six times at the Autumn Exhibition (Høstutstillingen) in Oslo.

He was awarded the Benneches legat 1963 and 1969 as well as the Lorch-Schivess Legacy in 1971. He conducted study trips between 1974–1976 to Greece, the Netherlands, Sweden and Denmark. In 1983, Håvarstein received the Stavanger Aftenblad cultural prize (Stavanger Aftenblads kulturpris). For the most part, Håvarstein worked with sculpture, but also made graphics and book illustrations. Håvarstein is represented by works at the Norwegian Museum of Contemporary Art, the National Gallery of Norway, and the Arts Council Norway.
