= Ivar Jerven =

Norwegian graphic artist

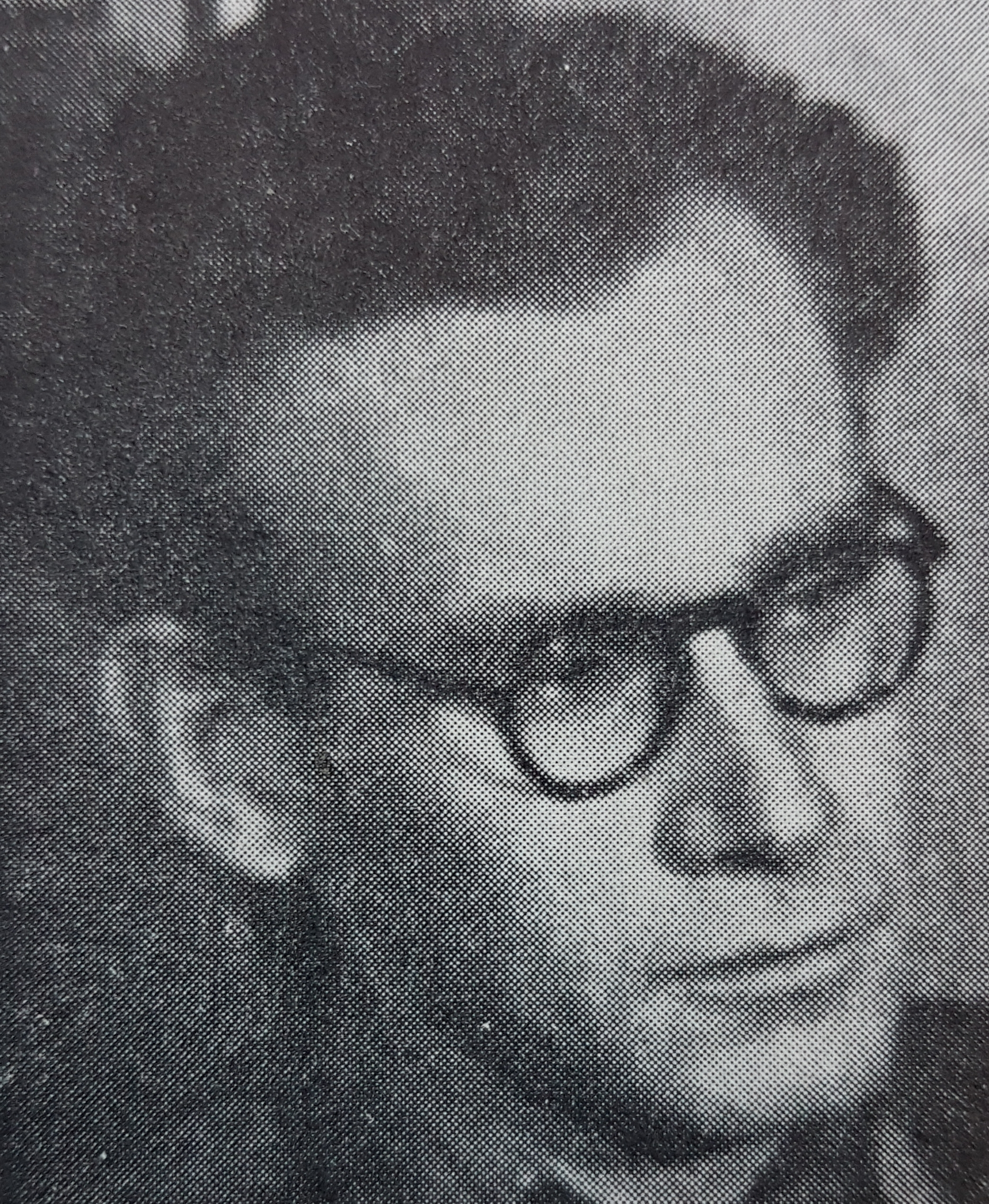
Ivar Jerven

Ivar Jerven (June 21, 1924 – April 24, 1994) was a Norwegian graphic artist, painter, and drawer.

== Biography ==
Jerven was born at Tune Municipality in Østfold, Norway. He studied at the Norwegian National Academy of Craft and Art Industry from 1943 to 1947. He then studied for three years under Per Krohg at the Norwegian National Academy of Fine Arts (from 1943 to 1947), after which landscape painting became his dominant means of expression. Until 1960 he mostly worked as a graphic artist, drawer, and book illustrator.

The motifs in his works were taken from Østfold county, Oslo, and Southern Norway. Dramatic pictures with the ravages of winter storms became a popular motif for him. He also painted poetic pictures of trees, often fragile and bare, with an emphasis on structure and rhythm. His color scheme was the initially dark, with green, ocher, rust red, and slate blue as most prominent. Later his palette became brighter and more varied and abstract.

Jerven took part in the Autumn Exhibition five times between 1946 and 1980. He was selected to display at the Southern Norway Exhibition (Sørlandsutstillingen) six times, with his last appearance in 1976. He also participated in a series of group and solo exhibitions in Norway and abroad. He supplied decorations for the National Gallery, the National Museum of Art, Architecture and Design, the Norwegian Arts Council, and the Municipal Art Collections of Oslo (Oslo kommunes kunstsamlinger), among others. His main work is a series of 40 paintings that was purchased by Norsk Hydro.

Jerven was part of an artists' colony that developed in Flosta Municipality after the Second World War. Together with artists such as Ellen Iden, Kjerstin Øvrelid, Knut Monrad, Finn Strømsted, Bodil Cappelen, Finn Henrik Bodvin, and Liv Nergaard, an artistic environment was created that drew inspiration from nature and the skerries. In the mid-1960s, six of these artists exhibited at the Skien Art Association (Skiens Kunstforening) as the Flosta Artists (Flostakunstnerne).

Jerven was married to the artist Kjerstin Øvrelid. He died in Oslo.
