= Liv Nergaard =

Norwegian artist (1924–2016)

Liv Nergaard (April 17, 1924 – July 25, 2016) was a Norwegian painter, textile artist, and sculptor. She also created portraits and produced puppet performances for educational use.

== Biography ==
Nergaard was born in Oppegård Municipality in Akershus county, the daughter of Tordis Nergaard and Eivin Nickelsen. She attended the Norwegian National Academy of Fine Arts from 1945 to 1946, and Bergen Teacher Training College (Bergen lærerhøgskole) from 1971 to 1972. In addition, she was a visiting student at the Norwegian National Academy of Craft and Art Industry (from 1943 to 1945 and again from 1952 to 1953) and at the Illegal Academy (Det Illegale Akademi) from 1943 to 1945. In 1961 she settled in Flosta Municipality together with her husband, the sculptor Finn Henrik Bodvin. During these years, she worked actively as a sculptor; among other things, she participated twice in the Autumn Exhibition (Høstutstillingen, in 1970 and 1976) and six times in the Southern Norway Exhibition (Sørlandsutstillingen, between 1969 and 1981). She was active in the Arendal Puppet Theater (Arendal figur og dukketeater) and, together with Ute de Lange Nilsen and others, was one of the initiators behind setting up the theater in 1969.

Liv Nergaard participated in the artists' colony that developed in Flosta after the Second World War. Together with artists such as Ferdinand Finne, Ellen Iden, Ivar Jerven, Kjerstin Øvrelid, Knut Monrad, Finn Strømsted, Bodil Cappelen, and Finn Henrik Bodvin, an artistic environment was created that drew inspiration from nature and the skerries. In the mid-1960s, six of these artists exhibited at the Skien Art Association (Skiens Kunstforening) as the Flosta Artists (Flostakunstnerne).
