= Kjerstin Øvrelid =

Norwegian artist (1929–1989)

Kjerstin Marie Øvrelid (March 16, 1929 – January 1989) was a Norwegian painter. She was known for her poetic paintings of flowers and depictions of the sea and skerries, usually those seen from Holmesund, northeast of Arendal, where she had her summer home.

Øvrelid was born in Hitra Municipality. She attended the Trondheim Academy of Fine Art from 1948 to 1949, the Norwegian National Academy of Craft and Art Industry from 1949 to 1950, and the Norwegian National Academy of Fine Arts from 1950 to 1953, where she studied under Aage Storstein and Jean Heiberg. In addition, she studied at the State Teachers' School in Notodden from 1953 to 1954, and she also attended the National School of Fine Arts in Paris from 1957 to 1958.

Her paintings have been described as having lyrical colors, with a bright saturated palette of red-yellow, blue, and green that contain a lot of white. In addition to landscapes, she also painted portraits, interiors, and still lifes. Øvrelid is represented in the National Museum of Art, Architecture and Design with the paintings Sommernatt (Summer Night, 1969) and Hav og rød himmel (Sea and Red Sky, 1978). She participated in the Autumn Exhibition fifteen times from 1959 to 1978, and six times in the Southern Norway Exhibition (Sørlandsutstillingen) from 1970 to 1977. She also took part in a number of solo and group exhibitions in Norway and abroad.

Jerven was part of an artists' colony that developed in Flosta Municipality after the Second World War. Together with artists such as Ellen Iden, Ivar Jerven, Knut Monrad, Finn Strømsted, Bodil Cappelen, Finn Henrik Bodvin, and Liv Nergaard, an artistic environment was created that drew inspiration from nature and the skerries. In the mid-1960s, six of these artists exhibited at the Skien Art Association (Skiens Kunstforening) as the Flosta Artists (Flostakunstnerne).

Øvrelid was married to the artist Ivar Jerven.
