= Finn Henrik Bodvin =

Norwegian sculptor

Finn Henrik Bodvin (October 12, 1928 – August 12, 2002) was a Norwegian sculptor.

== Biography ==
Bodvin was born in Trondheim, Norway. Bodvin received his art education at the University of Detroit Mercy and Wayne State University in Detroit (1950), Trondheim Art School (now part of the Trondheim Academy of Fine Art) (1952), Chelsea College of Arts in London (1952), Norwegian National Academy of Craft and Art Industry (1952–1953) and Norwegian National Academy of Fine Arts under Per Palle Storm (1953–1956).

He worked with various types of materials, from clay, stone, and wood to sculptures in copper and steel. His manner of expression varied from figurative sculpture with the human body as a source of inspiration to abstract and non-figurative works in steel and other metals. Most of his sculptures are formed of welded copper and steel, a technique he has achieved by working with scrap iron.

He participated in a number of solo and group exhibits in Norway and abroad, and, among other venues, he took part in the Autumn Exhibition several times from 1958 to 1977 and in the Southern Norway Exhibition (Sørlandsutstillingen) six times, from 1970 to 1975. For many years, Bodvin lived on the island of Flosterøya, and during this period he was part of an artists' colony that formed in the years after World War II. Together with other artists such as Ellen Iden, Ivar Jerven, Kjerstin Øvrelid, Knut Monrad, Finn Strømsted, Bodil Cappelen, and Liv Nergaard, they created an artistic environment that drew inspiration from nature and the skerries. In the mid-1960s, six of these artists exhibited at the Skien Art Association (Skiens Kunstforening) as the Flosta Artists (Flostakunstnerne).

== Selected works ==
- Tradisjon. Utkast til fiskermonument, copper (1954)
- Claustrum, steel (1967)
- Figurer, stainless steel (1969)
- Skritsj-Skratsj, iron (1970)
- Fugl Phoenix, steel (1978)
