= Bjørn Gunnar Olsen =

Norwegian writer

Njørn Gunnar Olsen
- Born: 7 April 1942; Halden, Norway
- Died: 1992 (aged 49–50)
- Occupations: Journalist, biographer, novelist, playwright

Bjørn Gunnar Olsen (7 April 1942 – 1992) was a Norwegian journalist, novelist, playwright and biographer.

== Career ==
Olsen made his literary debut in 1967 with Ved skjulestedet. Among his novels are Hud over Damhauen from 1982, and Alfreds hus from 1986. Other works include a biography of Martin Tranmæl, biographies of sportspeople, and plays.

He was awarded Mads Wiel Nygaards Endowment in 1972.

== Personal life ==
Olsen was born in Halden on 7 April 1942. He died in 1992.

Awards
Preceded by Sissel Lange-Nielsen and Arild Nyquist	Recipient of the Mads Wiel Nygaard's Endowment; 1972 (together with Finn Havrevold, Kåre Prytz and Odd Solumsmoen	Succeeded by Finn Strømsted
