= Eva Lange =

Norwegian artist

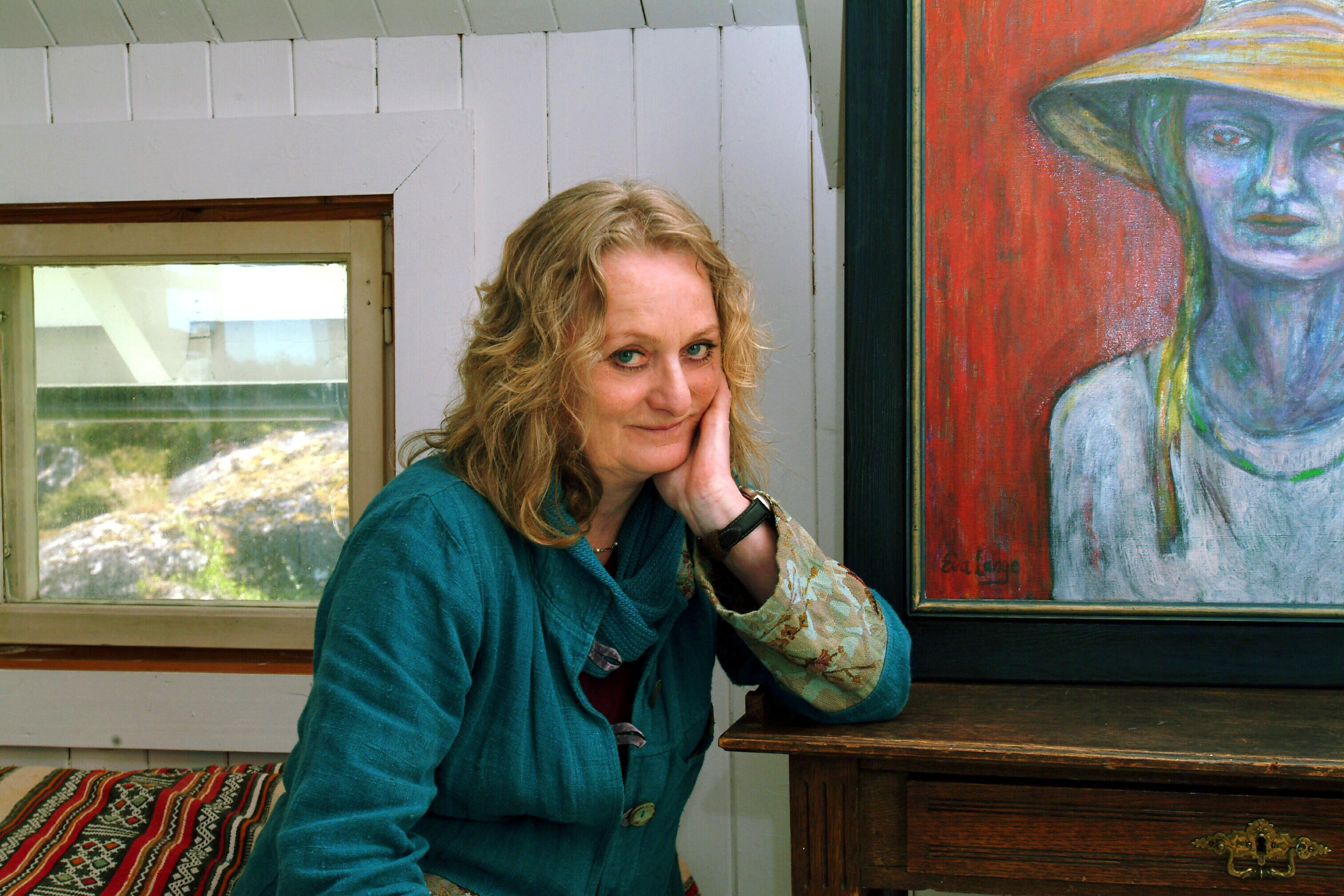
- Born: 15 June 1944; Arendal, Norway
- Died: 12 May 2017 (aged 72); Hvaler, Norway
- Education: Norwegian National Academy of Craft and Art Industry; Norwegian National Academy of Fine Arts
- Occupations: Painter, illustrator and printmaker
- Spouse: Victor Lind
- Awards: Prince Eugen Medal (2001)

Eva Lange (15 June 1944 – 12 May 2017) was a Norwegian illustrator, printmaker and painter.

== Biography ==
Born in Arendal on 15 June 1944, Lange was a daughter of Anna Theresie Larsen and Jean Emil Lange. She was married to painter and sculptor Victor Lind.

Lange was educated at the Norwegian National Academy of Craft and Art Industry in Oslo, and at the Norwegian National Academy of Fine Arts. She made her exhibition debut at Høstutstillingen in 1967. Her art works at the National Gallery of Norway include the naturalistic Frø from 1971 and the surrealistic drawing Demagog from 1977.

She was awarded the Prince Eugen Medal in 2001.

Lange died in Hvaler Municipality on 12 May 2017.
