= Revold =

Revold is a surname. Notable people with the surname include:

- Axel Revold (1887–1962), Norwegian painter
- Jens Revold (born 1948), Norwegian politician
- Revold Entov, (1931–) Russian economist and academician
