= Håkon Bleken =

Norwegian painter and graphic artist (1929–2025)

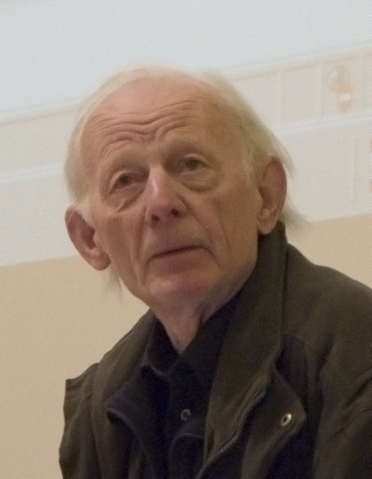
- Bleken in 2006
- Born: Håkon Ingvald Bleken; 9 January 1929; Trondheim, Norway
- Died: 21 January 2025 (aged 96); Trondheim, Norway
- Known for: Painting, graphic arts
- Awards: Commander of the Royal Norwegian Order of St. Olav

Håkon Ingvald Bleken (9 January 1929 – 21 January 2025) was a Norwegian painter and graphic artist.

Bleken is represented in several museums in Norway, including the National Museum in Oslo and art museums in Trondheim and Bergen. He illustrated a number of books, and contributed to decoration of churches and public buildings. He was decorated Commander of the Order of St. Olav.

== Background ==
Bleken was born in Trondheim on 9 January 1929, a son of architect Haakon Bleken and Brynhild Ribsskog. He died in Trondheim on 21 January 2025, at the age of 96. His funeral service was held in Nidaros Cathedral, where Minister of Culture Lubna Jaffery, Åge Aleksandersen and Arve Tellefsen were among the attendants.

== Education and work as an artist ==
Bleken started his art education at Trondheim art school, where he studied under Karsten Keiseraas and Oddvar Alstad from 1948 to 1949. He then studied at the Norwegian National Academy of Fine Arts in Oslo under professor Jean Heiberg from 1949 to 1952. In 1950, he participated in the etching class at the Norwegian National Academy of Craft and Art Industry under Chrix Dahl. From 1953 to 1954 he was a student at Statens Sløyd- og Tegnelærerskole in Notodden.

Bleken worked as a senior scientific officer at the Institute of Form and Colour Studies at the Norwegian Institute of Technology from 1960 to 1972.

Media said in 2025, that he became part of ['Group 5'] Gruppe 5; they were five artists in Trondheim; furthermore, in that group there was "abstraction and modernism and principles from architecture that was used to create art".

== Works ==
A series of coal sketches called Fragmenter av et diktatur (Fragments of a dictatorship) from 1971 was his definitive breakthrough as an artist.

Bleken painted several well-known people, among them Olav V of Norway, Arne Nordheim, and Wenche Foss.

Bleken was also known as an illustrator of literary works. He illustrated such works as Hedda Gabler by Henrik Ibsen, Haugtussa by Arne Garborg, Mysteries by Knut Hamsun, Babette's Feast by Karen Blixen and Dalen Portland by Kjartan Fløgstad.

As one of Norway's most prominent contemporary artists he had a series of separate exhibitions in the country's biggest galleries, among them the National Museum of Norway and the Henie-Onstad Art Centre, since his debut in 1951. His works have also been bought for several art collections in Norway, among them those of the National Museum of Norway, Trondheim Art Museum and KODE Kunstmuseer og komponisthjem in Bergen.

Bleken contributed to the embellishment of buildings such as St. Olav Cathedral, E. C. Dahls Brewery, Tyholttårnet and Olavshallen in Trondheim; Spjelkavik Church, Oslo Concert Hall, Oslo Central Station and the Norwegian Parliament Building, all in Norway.

== Theft ==
In December 2010, thieves broke into Bleken's storage room and stole nine of his paintings, seven of which were cut out of their frames in such a manner that they were badly damaged. The paintings, which included a portrait of Arne Nordheim and one self-portrait, were all made by Bleken himself, with the exception of the painting Hjortedansøsen by the Norwegian painter Arthur Alstad. The paintings had an estimated collective value of 2,000,000 NOK, of which Hjortedansøsen alone had an estimated value of 250,000 NOK. The paintings were retrieved by the police on 28 December, when they were found rolled up in a small storage room in Heimdal.

== Awards ==
In 1990, Bleken was awarded Knight, First Class of the Royal Norwegian Order of St. Olav. On 4 September 2009 the Norwegian Royal Court announced that Harald V of Norway has promoted Bleken to Commander of the same order "for his work as an artist". In 2005 he was awarded Anders Jahre's culture prize. The regional newspaper Adresseavisen pronounced Bleken "Trønder of the year" in 2003. He has also been awarded several other minor culture prizes.
