= Johan Munthe Cappelen =

Norwegian lawyer and judge (1884–1962)

Johan Munthe Cappelen (May 20, 1884 – October 30, 1962) was a Norwegian legal scholar and judge.

Cappelen was born in Oslo, the son of Christen Johan Cappelen (1846–1915) and Jensine Munthe (1857–1932). He passed his examen artium in Oslo and became a candidate of law in 1908. He established his own legal office in Stavanger in 1915, became a supreme court lawyer in 1920, and was the municipal prosecutor for Stavanger for several years. He served as a stipendiary magistrate (byfogd) in Drammen from 1939 to 1945, when he moved to Oslo's Bekkelaget neighborhood, where he was a high court judge on the Eidsivating Court of Appeal and a lawspeaker. Among other cases, he involved as a judge with the legal purge in Norway after World War II. He is known for having issued the sole dissenting opinion in 1946 in the acquittal of Police Inspector Knut Rød, who was tried for participating in the occupation-era state police actions against Norway's Jewish population.

In 1946, Cappelen became the first district judge in Asker and Bærum, where he served until he reached statutory retirement age in 1954. After that, he served for a few years as an acting judge for the Eidsivating Court of Appeal.

His obituary in Aftenposten on October 31, 1962 closed with the following words: "He was a clear representative of the best in Norwegian civil servant culture and he had friends everywhere."

Cappelen was part of the Drammen branch of the Cappelen family. He was married twice, first to Borghild Aanensen (with whom he had one daughter), and then to Edith M. Heiberg. He had two daughters with his second wife, one of whom was the artist Bodil Cappelen, who married the poet Finn Strømsted and then the poet Olav H. Hauge. All of Cappelen's daughters have descendants living today, with surnames including Thiis, Strømsted, and Endresen.
