= Illegal Academy =

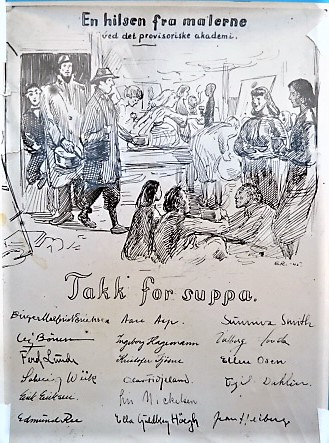
A drawing from the Illegal Academy in 1944

The Illegal Academy (Norwegian: Det Illegale Akademi) was an underground Norwegian teaching institution for artists.

The Illegal Academy was established in Oslo in 1941. It was created as a response to Nazified Norwegian arts education after the Norwegian National Academy of Craft and Art Industry was closed and the Norwegian National Academy of Fine Arts was taken over by Søren Onsager. Instructors at the academy included Axel Revold, Jean Heiberg, Henrik Sørensen, Per Palle Storm, Stinius Fredriksen, and Per Krohg, and its students included Edmund Ree, Harald Peterssen, Ulf Dreyer, Victor Sparre, Olav Johan Andreassen, Gladys Raknerud, Arnold Haukeland, and Liv Nergaard. The academy changed locations often; one of its early locations was at Pilestredet 15b, where it was referred to as Fabrikken (The Factory) in reference to the Norena Corset Factory.
