= Oppsal Church =

Coordinates: 59°53′58.938″N 10°50′35.174″E

- Oppsal kirke
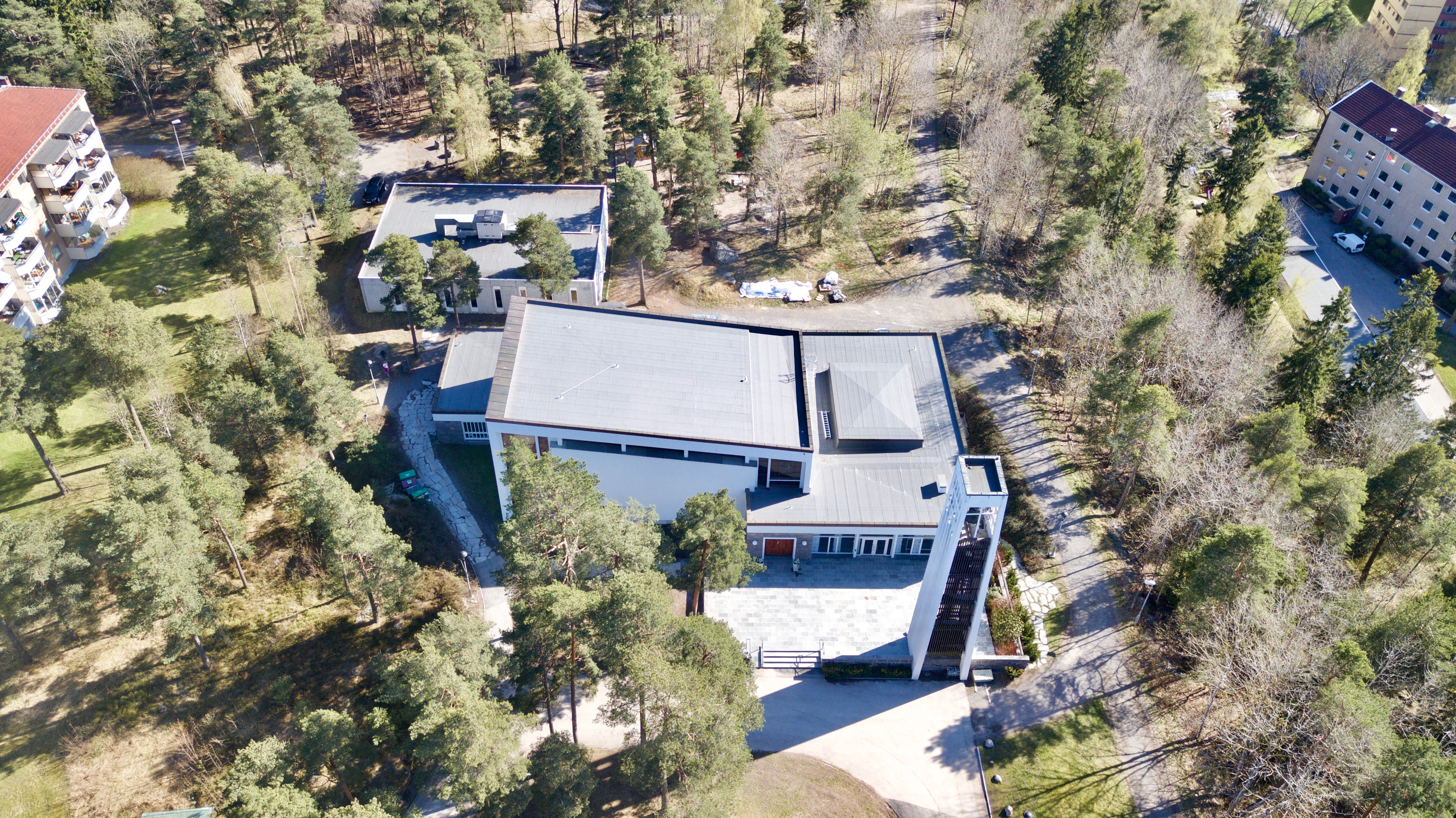

- Location within Oslo Location within Norway
- Location: Solbergliveien 85, Oppsal; Oslo,
- Country: Norway
- Denomination: Church of Norway
- Churchmanship: Evangelical Lutheran
- Website: oppsalmenighet.no

History
- Status: Parish church
- Consecrated: 1961

Architecture
- Functional status: Active
- Architect(s): H. W. Simers; H. Chr. Gaaserud

Specifications
- Capacity: 600 seats

Administration
- Diocese: Diocese of Oslo
- Deanery: Søndre Aker
- Parish: Oppsal

Oppsal Church in Oslo, Norway is the parish church for the Oppsal congregation. It is a church center erected in concrete and natural stone, according to drawings by the architects H. W. Simers and H. Chr. Gaaserud. Oppsal Church was consecrated in 1961. It has a high freestanding bell tower. 400 seats, in addition to an adjacent church hall with 200 seats, separated from the church room by a folding door, as well as a kitchen. The great crucifix in the altar wall acts as an altarpiece, and is made by Victor Sparre, together with the church's other stained glass windows. The stained glass measure a total of 220 m², which is the largest area of glass art in any Norwegian church that was built after 1945. The pulpit of wood and the altar and the baptismal font is in soapstone were designed by the architects. The new digital church organ (Allan H-III 370 Heritage) is from 2013.

Downstairs there is a smaller hall and a shelter, which can be used for various activities for children and adolescents. There is also an office wing.

The three church bells in the separate bell tower were cast by Olsen Nauen Bell Foundry and were mounted in 1961. They are named "The Way", "The Truth", and "The Life ".

Oppsal Church is listed by the Norwegian Directorate for Cultural Heritage.

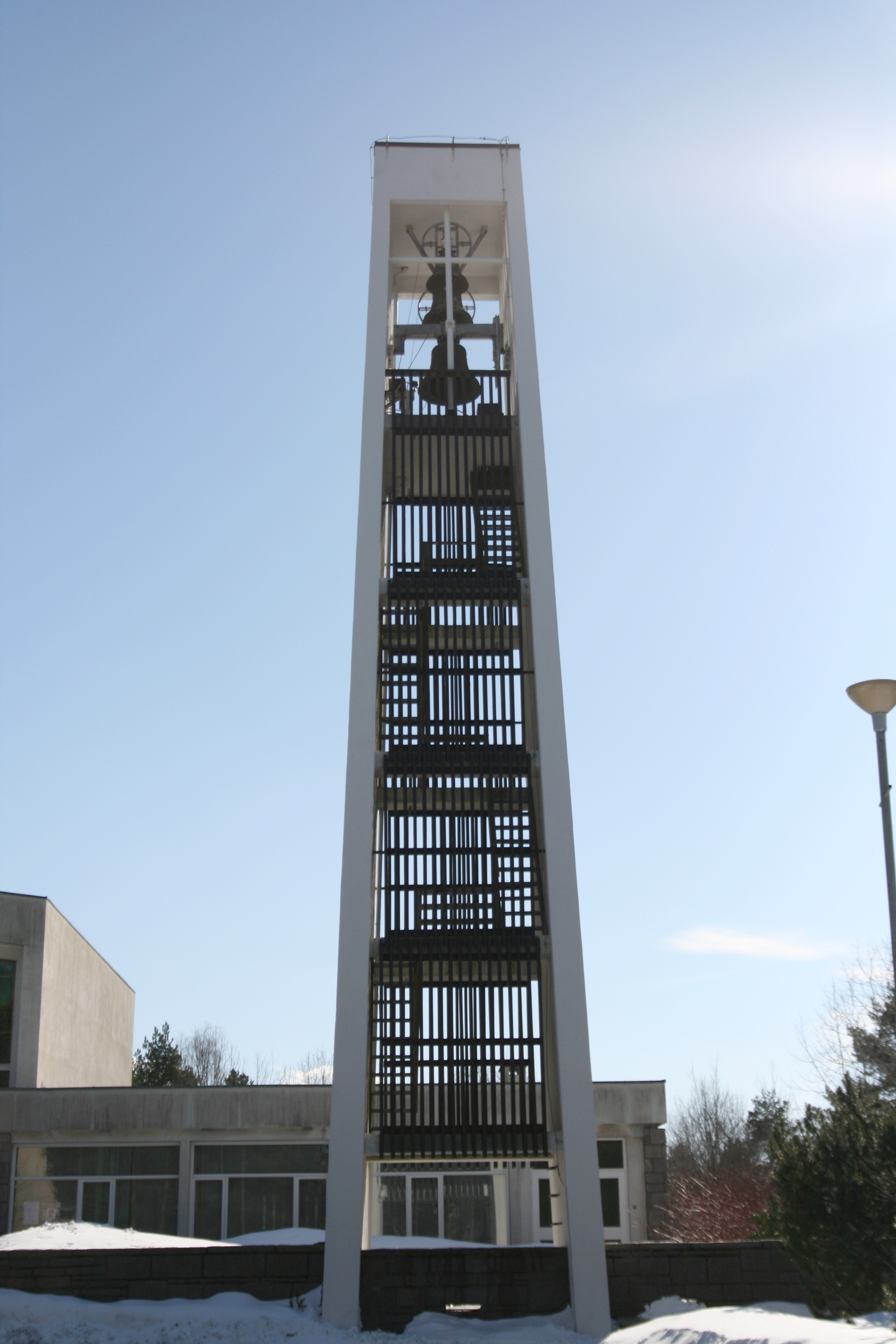
The separate bell tower
