= Victor Lind =

Victor Lind may refer to:

- Victor Lind (artist)
- Victor Lind (footballer)
