= Roar Høyland =

Norwegian industrial designer (1930–2022)

- Born: 13 July 1930; Oslo, Norway
- Died: 30 March 2022 (aged 91); Oslo
- Occupation: Industrial designer
- Employer: Norwegian National Academy of Craft and Art Industry
- Organization: Norway Design

Roar Høyland (13 July 1930 – 30 March 2022) was a Norwegian industrial designer. He was born in Oslo. From 1971 to 1981 he was leader of the design department of the organization Norway Design. He was rector of the Norwegian National Academy of Craft and Art Industry from 1989 to 1986. Among his books are Mellom to stoler from 1980, Sidespor from 1986, and Oppsving from 1996, all in cooperation with Dagny and Finn Hald. Høyland died in Oslo on 30 March 2022, at the age of 91.
