= Advocaat (surname) =

Advocaat is a surname. Notable people with the surname include:

- Dick Advocaat (born 1947), Dutch footballer and coach
- Gunnvor Advocaat (1912–1997), Norwegian painter
