= Anvil Award =

Norwegian literary prize

The Anvil Award (Norwegian: Amboltprisen) is a Norwegian literary prize conferred by the association Friends of Olav H. Hauge (Venelaget Olav H. Hauge). The prize consists of NOK 10,000 and an artistically crafted "anvil" created by the sculptor Leif Gjerme. The Anvil Award is conferred upon the person that has done the most to promote awareness of Hauge's poetry.

== List of prizewinners ==
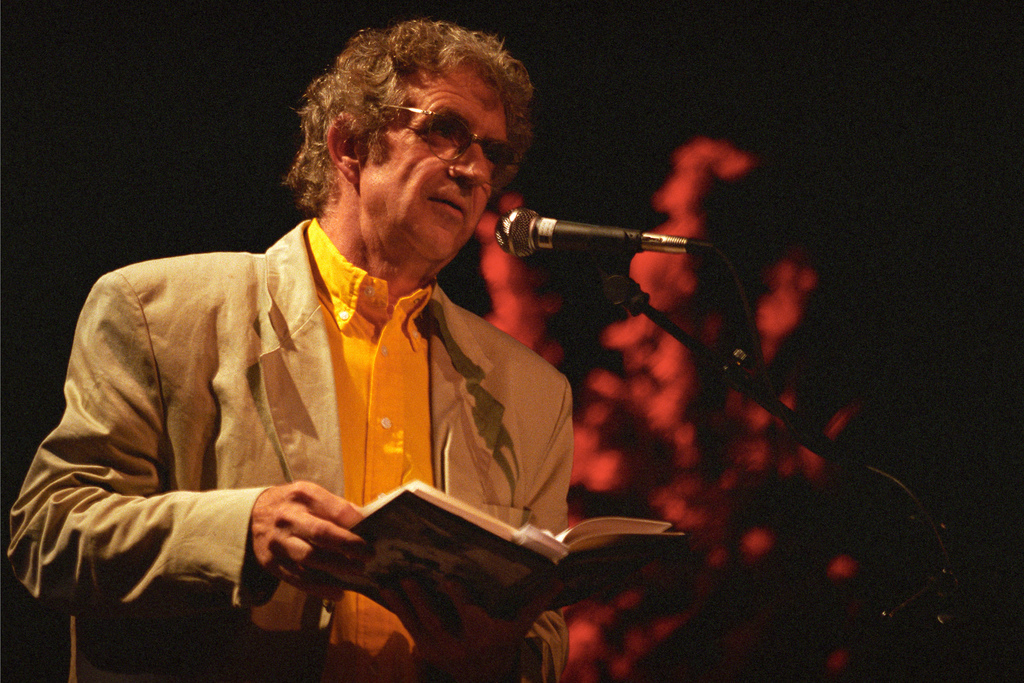
Jan Erik Vold (2004 prizewinner)

- 2000: Idar Stegane
- 2002: Ola E. Bø
- 2004: Jan Erik Vold
- 2006: Erling Lægreid
- 2008: Robert Bly
- 2010: Arne Skjerven
- 2012: Bodil Cappelen
- 2014: Espen Eide
- 2016: Klaus Anders
- 2018: Ole Karlsen
- 2021: Kathrine Hanson
- 2022: Einar Økland
- 2024: Geir Netland
