= Gerd Nyquist =

Norwegian novelist and children's writer

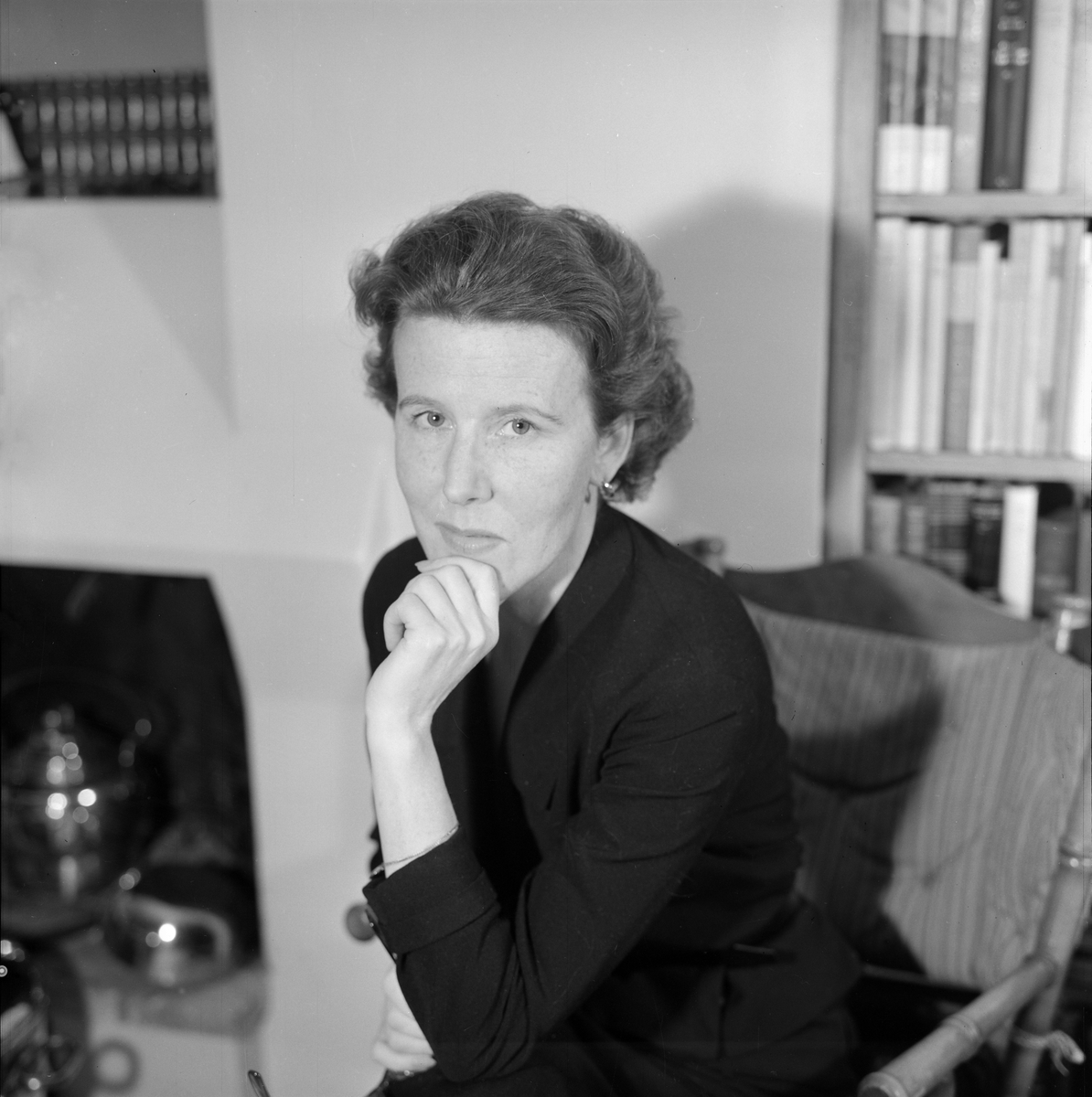
- Born: 15 March 1913; Kristiania, Norway
- Died: 22 November 1984 (aged 71)
- Occupations: Novelist, crime fiction writer and children's writer
- Children: Arild Nyquist
- Awards: Defence Medal 1940–1945

Gerd Nyquist (15 March 1913 – 22 November 1984) was a Norwegian novelist and children's writer.

== Biography ==
She was born in Kristiania. She was married in 1936 with ship broker Arild Otto Nyquist (1911–1974). She was the granddaughter of government minister Bernhard Brænne (1854-1927) and the mother of novelist and poet Arild Nyquist (1937–2004).

Nyquist studied journalism at the University of California and history at the University of Oslo. During World War II she took part in the resistance movement. She was awarded the Defence Medal for her participation in the fight against the German occupation of Norway.

She made her literary debut in 1957 with the novel Måne over Munkeby. She is best known for her two crime novels, Avdøde ønsket ikke blomster from 1960, and Stille som i graven from 1966 featuring detective Martin Bakke. Both books depict a traditional, bourgeois society from Oslo's west edge. Nyquist had a number of positions and in 1972 was a co-founder and first president of Rivertonklubben.
