= Victor Lind (artist) =

Norwegian painter and sculptor (born 1940)

Victor Lind (born 15 December 1940) is a Norwegian painter and sculptor. His teachers and inspirators include Chrix Dahl, Alf-Jørgen Aas and Rolf Nesch. Two of his works are located at the National Museum of Art, Architecture and Design. Among his works is also a controversial statue of Knut Rød.

He was married to illustrator Eva Lange.
