= Kaare Bratung =

Norwegian illustrator and comic artist

Kaare Bratung (5 July 1906 – 1985) was a Norwegian illustrator and comic artist.

He was born in Bodø, and graduated from the Norwegian National Academy of Craft and Art Industry in 1929. He was one of the primary names of early Norwegian comics, alongside Ivar Mauritz-Hansen, Sigurd Winsnes and Jens R. Nilssen. He became known for his comics Dagros and Baldrian, printed in Nationen, and Professoren printed in Morgenbladet. His own publication Se og les had a lifespan of two years. He died in 1985.
