= Eastern Norway Exhibition =

Norwegian contemporary art exhibition

The Eastern Norway Exhibition (Norwegian: Østlandsutstillingen) is a traveling regional exhibition of Norwegian contemporary art open to artists from Akershus, Buskerud, Hedmark, Oppland, Oslo, Østfold, and Vestfold counties. The exhibitions comprise about 60 works that are selected by a jury and divided into three categories: two-dimensional, three-dimensional, and audiovisual works. The Eastern Norway Exhibition is organized in equal part by district artists' organizations in Eastern Norway and it is financed by the counties in the region through the Eastern Norwegian County Network (Norwegian: Østlandssamarbeidet). It is held in three to four different places in Eastern Norway. The exhibition was first held in 1979.

Other regional exhibitions are the Northern Norway Exhibition (Den Nord-Norske Kunstutstilling), the Central Norway Exhibition (Den midtnorske kunstutstilling), the Western Norway Exhibition (Vestlandsutstillingen), and the Southern Norway Exhibition (Sørlandsutstillingen). These play a strong role in Norway's artistic milieu alongside the annual nationwide Autumn Exhibition in Oslo.
