= Western Norway Exhibition =

Visual arts exhibition in Norway

The Western Norway Exhibition (Norwegian: Vestlandsutstillingen) is an annual exhibition for visual artists from Western Norway. It is generally a touring exhibition held in various places in Western Norway. Artists associated with the region are eligible to take part.

The Western Norway Exhibition has been an important venue for artists from the region ever since it started in 1922. The exhibition is a cooperative effort between the Kube Art Museum in Ålesund, the Kabuso Art Gallery in Øystese, the Sunnfjord Art Association in Førde, the Haugesund Art Gallery, and the Stavanger Art Association. Financial support is provided by the counties of Rogaland, Vestland, and Møre og Romsdal, as well as the Arts Council of Norway.

In addition to the Western Norway Exhibition, there are four other annual regional art exhibitions: the Eastern Norway Exhibition (Østlandsutstillingen), the Southern Norway Exhibition (Sørlandsutstillingen), the Central Norway Exhibition (Den midtnorske kunstutstilling), and the Northern Norway Exhibition (Den Nord-Norske Kunstutstilling). The exhibitions vary in how they are organized.

== History ==
The Western Norway Exhibition was held for the first time in 1922. The initiative for it came from Axel Revold and the art historian Einar Lexow or, according to a 1975 newspaper article, from the artistic milieu in Stavanger, in which artists in the town met regularly at Harry Landås's apartment, where the discussion at one point turned to the Autumn Exhibition and Olav Ansgar Larsen suggested setting up their own exhibition for Western Norway. After the idea developed further, Larsen got in touch with Nils Krantz in Bergen, and the idea then became a reality.

In 1926, painters from Trøndelag were invited to participate, but this only occurred once. The exhibition has been held annually since 1928, with participants coming from the four counties of Western Norway.

== 2011 Western Norway Exhibition ==
The point of departure for the exhibition in 2011 was the short story "Rom for sten og hjort" (Space for Rock and Deer) by Tormod Haugland. The artistic coordinators were Karolin Tampere and Johanne Nordby Wernø.

== 2012 Western Norway Exhibition ==
The theme of the exhibition in 2012 was motion, and the exhibition was curated by Annemari Skeide.
