= Omar Andréen =

Omar Andréen (12 September 1925 – 1 June 2010) was a Norwegian painter, graphic artist, and illustrator.

He took his education at the Norwegian National Academy of Craft and Art Industry, as well as from 1943 to 1945, Hayter, Paris.

Omar Andréen took part in the exhibitions in Ljubljana (1956), Copenhagen (1956), Stockholm (1960, 1980), Budapest (1980), London (1986), as well as in many group and individual exhibitions in Norway. Notable book illustrations include Ørretsommer og rypehøst (by Nils Johan Rud, 1961), Vassfaret (by Per Hohle, 1964) and Simla (by Olav Nordrå, 1969). He also illustrated A-magasinet for twenty years. His works have been bought by the Norwegian National Gallery (Nasjonalgalleriet), State Gallery (Riksgalleriet), Stockholm city collections, Oregon State University, among other.

Omar Andréen died in June 2010 in Asker.
