= Arnold Haukeland =

Norwegian sculptor

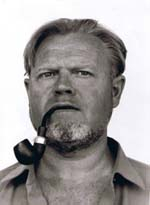
- Born: 28 March 1920; Verdal Municipality, Norway
- Died: 18 June 1983 (aged 63)
- Occupation: Sculptor
- Awards: Prince Eugen Medal (1970); Order of St. Olav (1983)

Arnold Haukeland (28 March 1920 – 18 June 1983) was a Norwegian sculptor.

== Biography ==
He was born at Verdal Municipality in Nord-Trøndelag county, Norway. He was the son of Arnold Martin Haukeland (1891–1977) and Lilly Karoline Wallem (1896–1969). He attended the Norwegian Institute of Technology (NTH) in Trondheim where he studied engineering. During the German occupation of Norway, he studied sculpture with Per Palle Storm and Stinius Fredriksen at the Illegal Academy. After the liberation of Norway at the end of World War II, he worked in the restoration studio of Nidaros Cathedral. In the spring of 1946 he was in Paris, where he briefly attended art school at Académie de la Grande Chaumiere. In 1946 Haukeland married photographer Randi Bothner (1921–2012).

Among his sculptural works are Friheten from 1953 at Bærum Municipality City Hall, Ballspillere from 1958 at Sarpsborg Stadion, and Air from 1962 at the University of Oslo. He served as director of the Norwegian Sculptor Association (1958-1959) and of the Visual Artists’ Board (1976-1979). He was awarded the Prince Eugen Medal for sculpture in 1970 and decorated Knight, First Class of the Order of St. Olav in 1983.

== Related reading ==
- Arild Haaland (1971) Arnold Haukeland. Runer i rommet (Oslo: Gyldendal Norsk Forlag)
- Erik Dæhlin (1980) Arnold Haukeland (Oslo: J.M. Stenersens Forlag)
