= Kai Fjell =

Norwegian painter, printmaker and scenographer

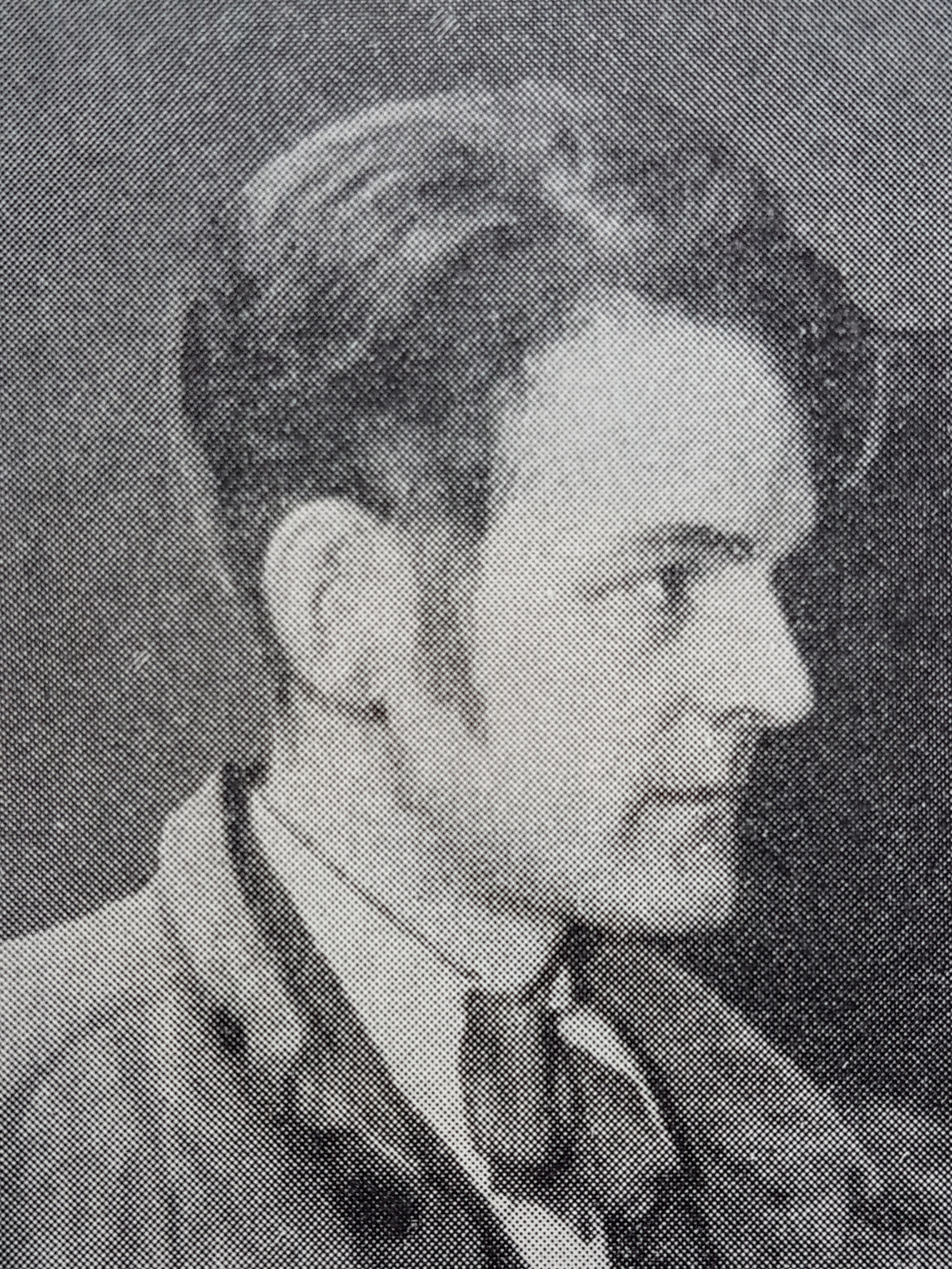
Kai Fjell.

Kai Breder Fjell (Norwegian pronunciation: [ˈkɑɪ ˈfjɛl]; March 2, 1907 – January 10, 1989) was a Norwegian painter, printmaker and scenographer.

== Personal life ==
Fjell was born on a farm in the village Skoger near Drammen. His father was a farmer and a painter, Conrad Bendiks Fjeld. His mother was a sister of Marie Hamsun. Fjell married Ingeborg Helene Holt (1907–1999) in 1931. They had two children, Sindre and Håvard Fjell.

== Career ==
Kai Fjell became a pupil of Carl von Hanno in Oslo in 1926. A year later, he enrolled at the Norwegian National Academy of Fine Arts of Oslo, where his main teachers were August Eiebakke and Olaf Willums from 1929. His debut exhibition in Oslo Art Society in 1932 was largely unsuccessful. Fjell achieved immediate success with his exhibition at Kunstnernes Hus at Oslo in 1937, where all the exhibited paintings were sold.

Kai Fjell early developed an ornamental expressionism. His pictures are heavily influenced by rural life and traditional Norwegian folk art. Fjell's early paintings are dominated by dark and earthy hues and often has grotesque motifs. His later works are significantly brighter, more daring in their use of colour, and tranquil in mood. He also found an outlet as a book illustrator and as a scenographer. Throughout his long career, the female figure and various fertility-symbols are recurring motifs in Fjell's pictures. Fjell's main work consists of Kalven reiser seg, Violinen and Likkjøreren on display at the Nasjonalmuseet.

He was appointed Commander of the Order of St. Olav in 1976. He was active as a painter until the end of his life. Kai Fjell died in his home at Lysaker.

== Selected works ==
- Barnemorderske, 1934
- Likkjøreren, 1936
- Kalven reiser seg, 1936
- Under takrenna, 1936
- Modellenes hyllest, 1936
- Gratulanter, 1937
- Musikanten, 1937
- Den sunkne by, 1954
