= Victor Sparre =

Norwegian painter and glass designer (1919–2008)

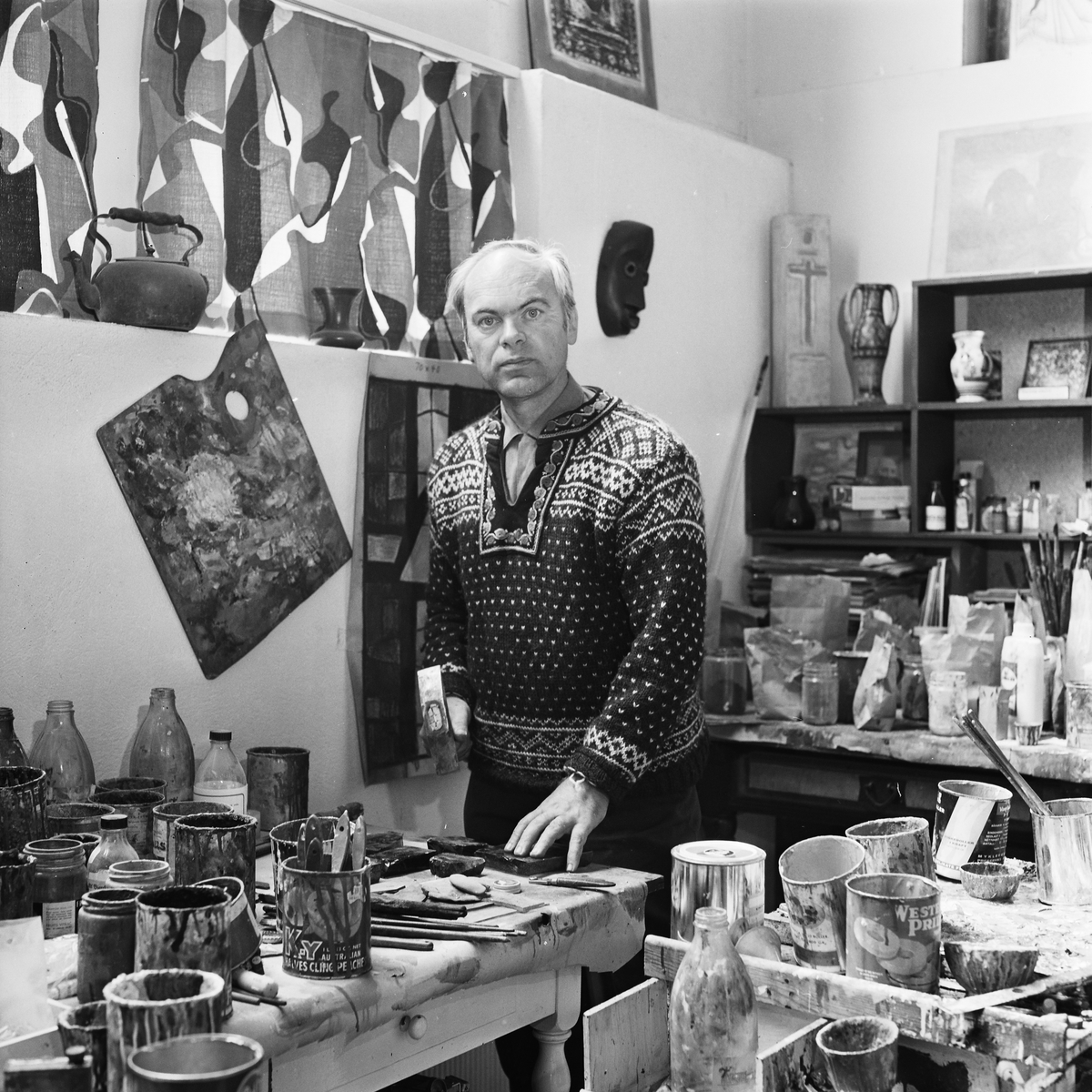
Victor Sparre in his studio, 1969

Victor Sparre (né Smith; 4 November 1919 – 16 March 2008) was a Norwegian painter, glass designer and non-fiction writer.

== Personal life ==
Sparre was born in Bærum as the son of librarian Victor Alf Smith and Eli Sparre. He was married to nurse Aase Marie Thomassen from 1955.

== Career ==
Sparre studied at the Norwegian National Academy of Craft and Art Industry from 1936. He became a member of the Oxford Group. In 1938 he enrolled at the Norwegian National Academy of Fine Arts, and assisted Axel Revold making decorations for the Oslo City Hall. During the occupation of Norway by Nazi Germany he took part in resistance work and joined the underground art academy led by Axel Revold and Jean Heiberg, and later also joined the military resistance organization Milorg.

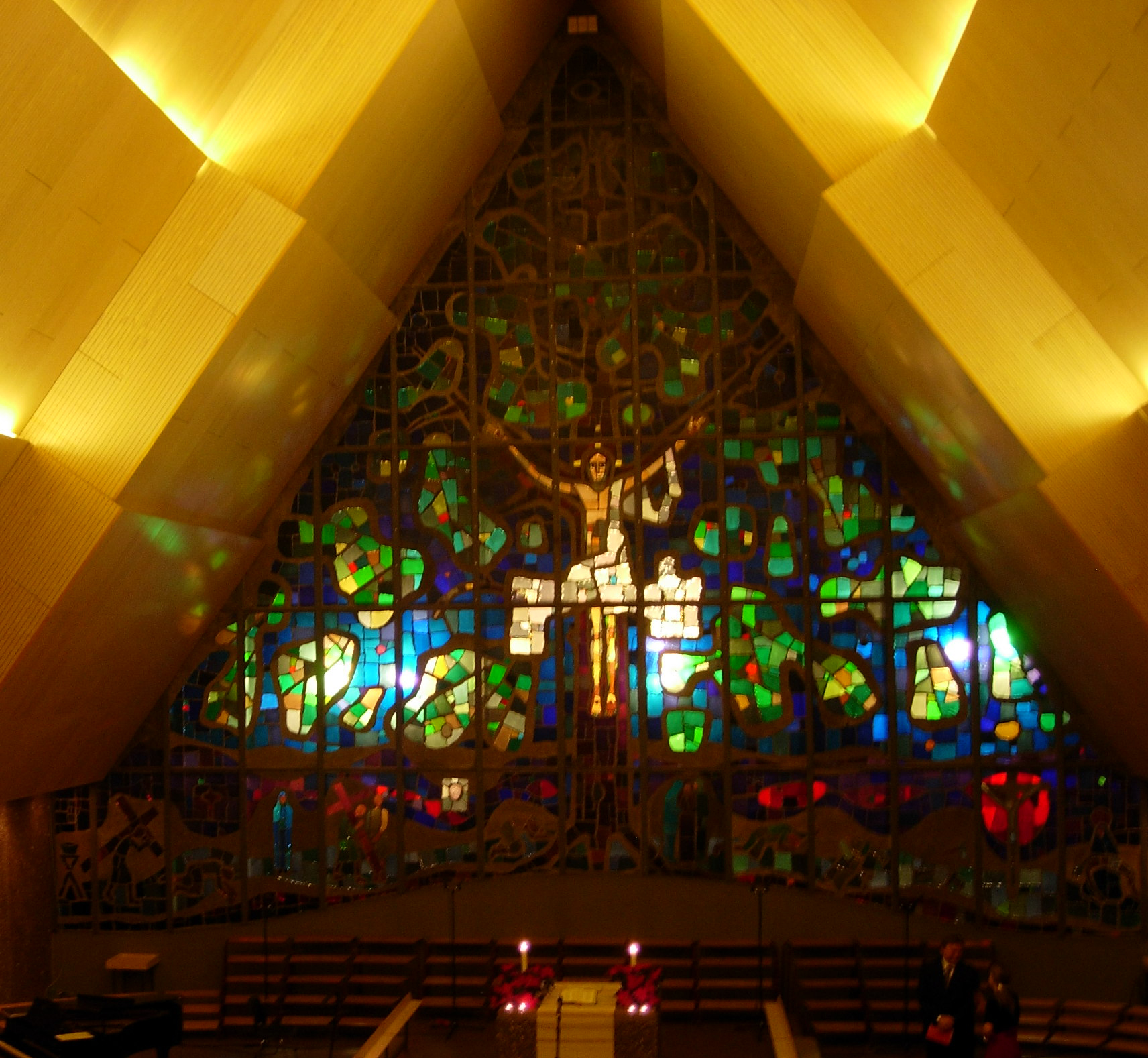
From Jeløy Church: "Tree of life"

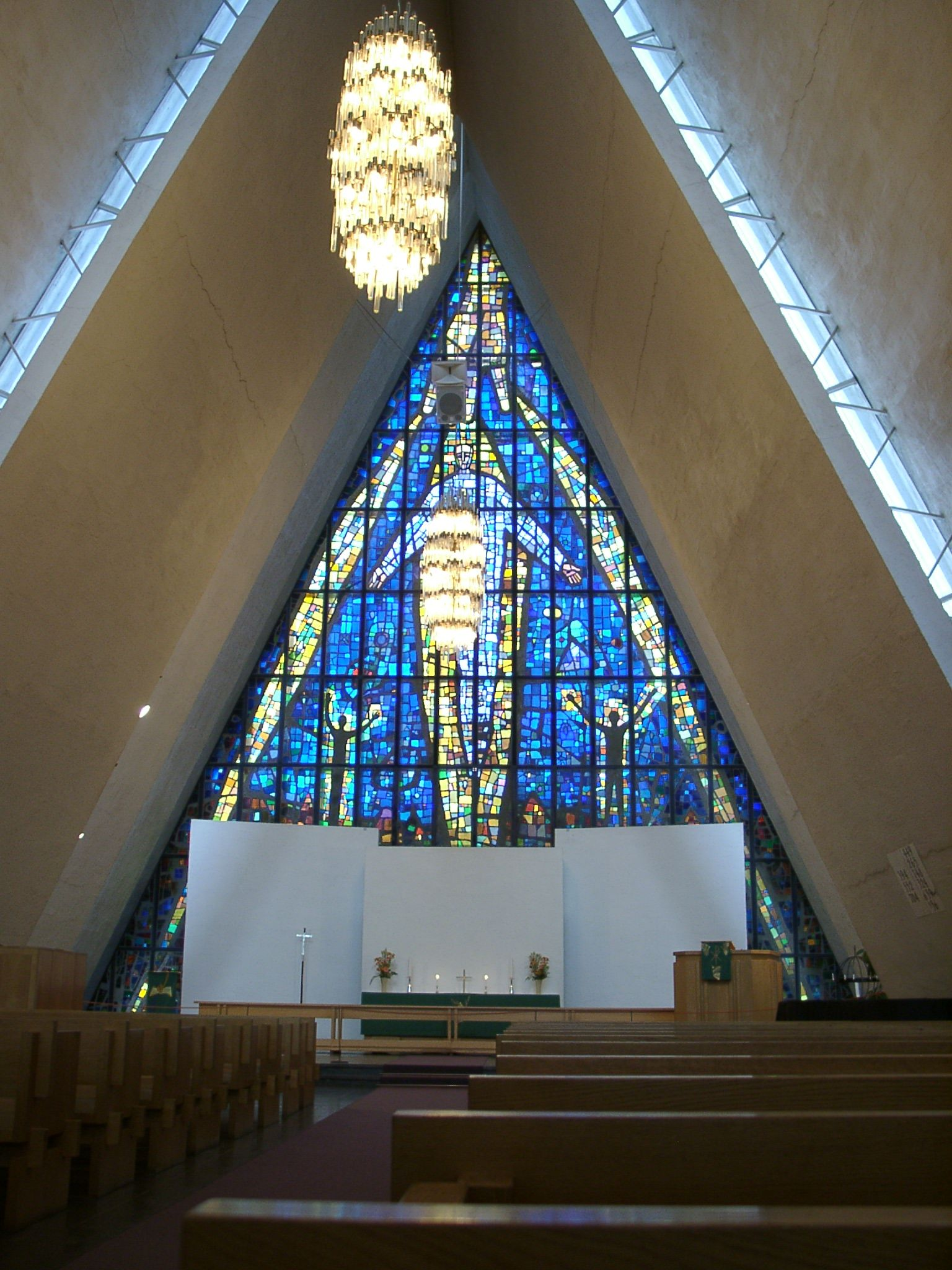
From Tromsdalen church: "Jesus' second coming"

He has decorated 25 churches, including the Stavanger Cathedral, the Arctic Cathedral (Tromsdalen Church), Jeløy Church and Immanuel Church. Among his paintings are Altergang and Svøpet from 1942, Individets død from 1969, Cellistens kone from 1974, and Veronicas svededuk from 1977. He published the book Stenene skal rope in 1974, and The flame in the darkness in 1980, and participated in debates on human rights. He was decorated Knight, First Class of the Royal Norwegian Order of St. Olav in 2003.
