= Olav Mosebekk =

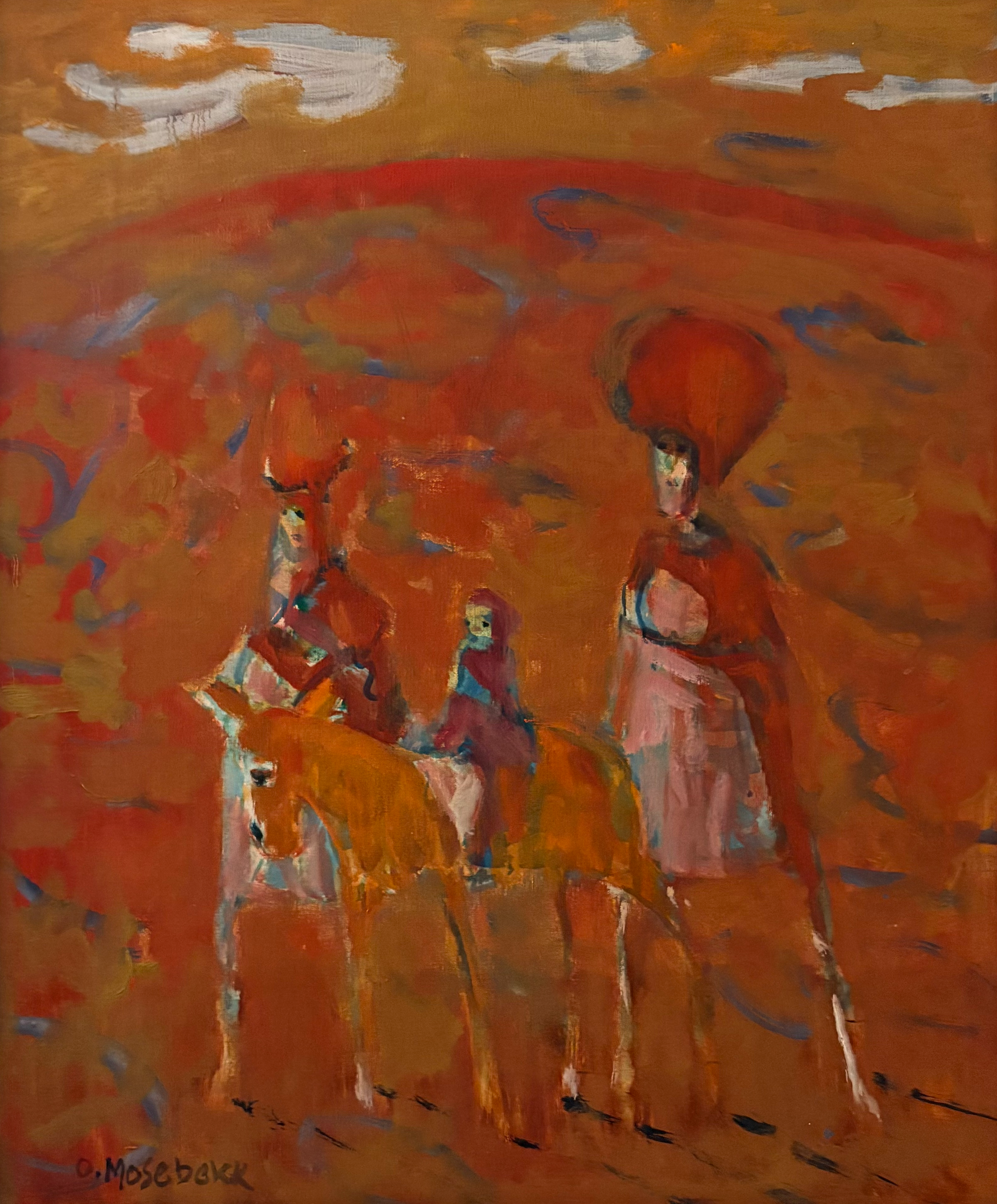
Camilleplukkerskene painting by Norwegian Painter Olav Mosebekk. Oil / Canvas, 64.00 x 53.00 cm. Currently held in a private collection outside Norway.

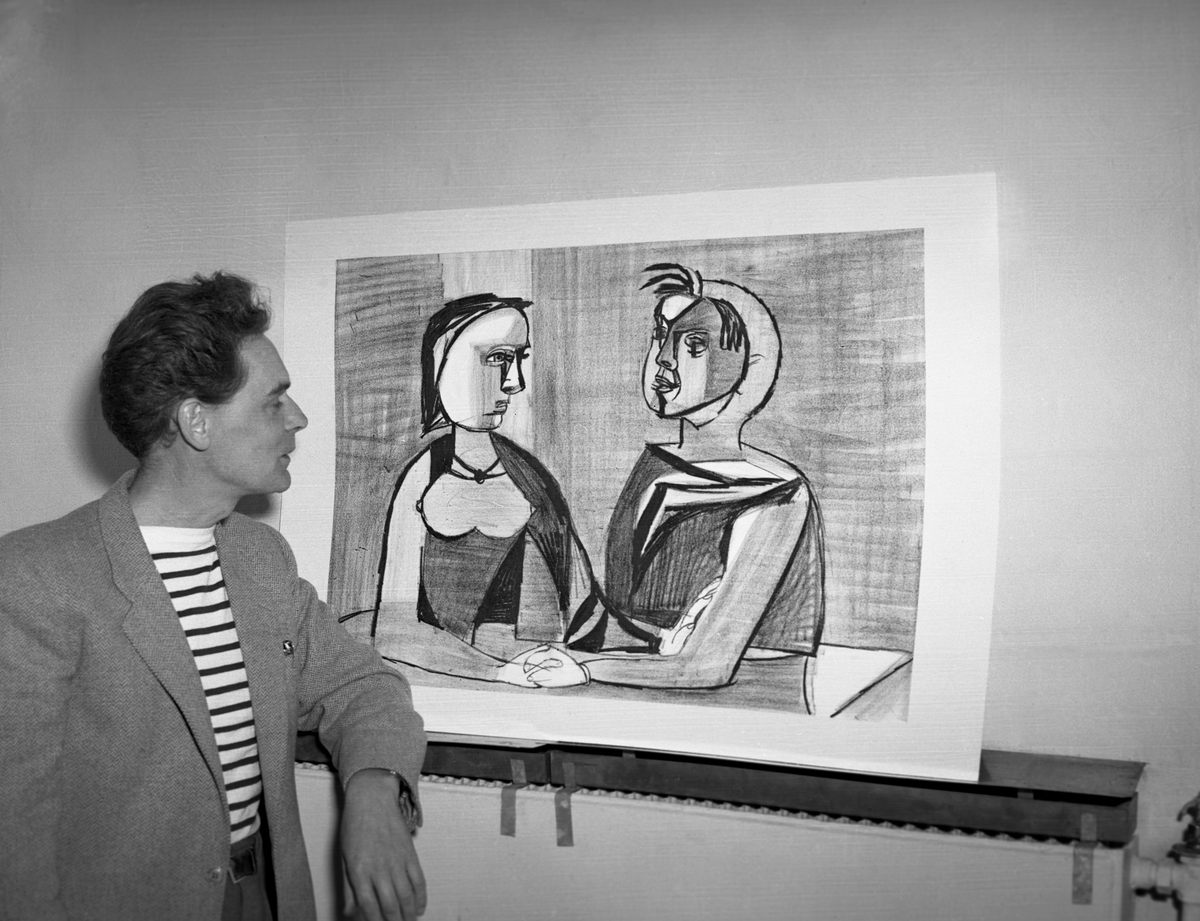
Olav Mosebekk as a Young Man

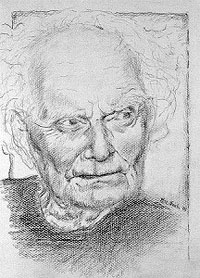
Self-portrait of Olav Mosebekk

Olav Mosebekk (13 September 1910 – 1 December 2001) was a Norwegian graphic artist, illustrator and painter.

== Biography ==
He was born at Kongsberg in Buskerud, Norway. His parents were Ole Thorkelsen Mosebekk (Mosebæk) (1886–1972) and Marta Kathrine Børsum (1888–1952). He studied at the Norwegian National Academy of Craft and Art Industry under August Eiebakke and Eivind Nielsen 1929-31 and the Norwegian National Academy of Fine Arts under Axel Revold and Per Krohg 1931–33. He also conducted a number of study trips including to Spain and Portugal in 1936 and in France 1949–50. From 1949 to 1950 he lived in Nice and from 1963 they traveled to France annually.

In 1946 he had his first major solo exhibition. He worked as illustrator for Arbeidermagasinet, and served as headmaster at the Norwegian National Academy of Craft and Art Industry (Statens håndverks- og kunstindustriskole) in Oslo from 1947 to 1969. From 1995 he ran his own drawing school together with Hans Normann Dahl.

Mosebekk's 1948 exhibition at the National Gallery's print collection marked a pivotal transformation in his practice, as he began incorporating Cubist elements into his work, with Picasso's influence becoming increasingly pronounced after 1949. His formal development continued through the following decades, with his colour use becoming notably more varied around 1960, introducing decorative interplay in colour planes that occasionally recalled Matisse, culminating in final paintings from the 1990s that sparkled with vibrant colour. From the late 1960s onwards, his treatment of female figures shifted towards a new and lush erotic context. Throughout his life, Mosebekk remained deeply socially engaged, positioning himself on the left and considering himself a communist, though he never joined the party, maintaining his political convictions whilst never hesitating to voice objections and thoughtful criticism. This openness and commitment to critical thinking extended to his pedagogical philosophy. As a teacher, he insisted that he did not teach his students to draw but rather to see, emphasising that drawing should remain a process of searching, free from clichés and fixed models.

He is represented at the National Gallery of Norway with illustrations and paintings.

== Selected Works ==
- Camilleplukkerskene, Oil / Canvas, 64.00 x 53.00 cm, private collection
- Duer, Lithograph, 52.00 x 59.00 cm, private collection
- Kvinne Med Fugl, Indian ink, 30.50 x 25.00 cm, private collection
- Kvinner Med Hodekurver, Oil / Canvas, 60.00 x 73.00 cm, private collection
- Kvinneportrett, Oil / Canvas, 91.00 x 48.00 cm, private collection
- Liggende Akt, Watercolour, 20.00 x 28.00 cm, private collection
- Mor & Barn, Oil / Canvas, 40.00 x 34.00 cm, private collection
- Par, Painting, 28.00 x 20.00 cm, private collection
- Par Med Fugl, Painting, 28.00 x 20.00 cm, private collection
- Sittende Kvinne, Painting, 26.00 x 19.00 cm, private collection
- Tulla, Lithograph, 18.50 x 25.00 cm, private collection
- Selvportrett, 1931, Oil / Canvas, 46.5 x 55 cm, Nasjonalmuseet for kunst, arkitektur og design, The Fine Art Collections.
