= Olaf Willums =

Norwegian painter and graphic artist

Olaf Willums (25 April 1886 – 25 February 1967) was a Norwegian painter and printmaker.

== Biography ==
He was born in Porsgrunn as a son of assurance director Olaf Karenius Abrahamsen (1853–1936) and Caroline Marie Halvorsen (1855–1925). In July 1915 in Hemne Municipality he married painter Signy Hassel (1879-1959). In 1916 he changed his surname to Willums.

He originally worked as an engineer, graduating from Skiensfjorden Mechanical Vocational School in 1904 and a technical college in Germany in 1907. He worked as a turbine constructor at Amme Giesecke & Konegen in Braunschweig from 1908 to 1912.

He then attended the Norwegian National Academy of Fine Arts where he studied under Halfdan Strøm and Christian Krohg from 1912 to 1913 and the Norwegian National Academy of Craft and Art Industry under Johan Nordhagen from 1913 to 1915. He was a pupil in Paris where he trained under Basil Schoukhaeff in 1927 and André Lhote in 1931. As a painter he debuted at the Statens kunstutstilling in 1913, and also at the 1914 Jubilee Exhibition. He had separate exhibitions in Oslo, Copenhagen and London, and was later invited to exhibit in numerous cities worldwide. In addition to paintings he did etchings, woodcuts, lithography and chalcography.

From 1919 to 1945 he was a teacher at the Norwegian National Academy of Fine Arts. He has been described as "a very popular teacher for a whole generation of Norwegian printmakers". Willums was also active in artists' organizations. He co-founded the Association of Norwegian Printmakers in 1919, served as vice chairman and then chairman from 1925 to 1929. During the German occupation of Norway he was a member of the Temporary Consultative Arts Council from November 1940 till 1942, and then of the Cultural Assembly (Norwegian: Kulturtinget) until the war's end. He was a member of the Fascist political party Nasjonal Samling. In 1944 he issued a book on partyfellow and painter Søren Onsager.

After the Second World War, he dedicated himself to painting. In 1958 he finally managed to exhibit the series of seven grand paintings, Draumkvædet, on which he had worked for thirty years. The National Gallery of Norway owns two paintings and some woodcuts, and his chalcographics were bought by Kupferstichkabinett, Dresden, British Museum and the Victoria & Albert Museum. He also made several ex libris.Draumkvædet is owned by Porsgrunn municipality. He died in February 1967 in Eidanger Municipality.
