= Gunnvor Advocaat =

Norwegian painter

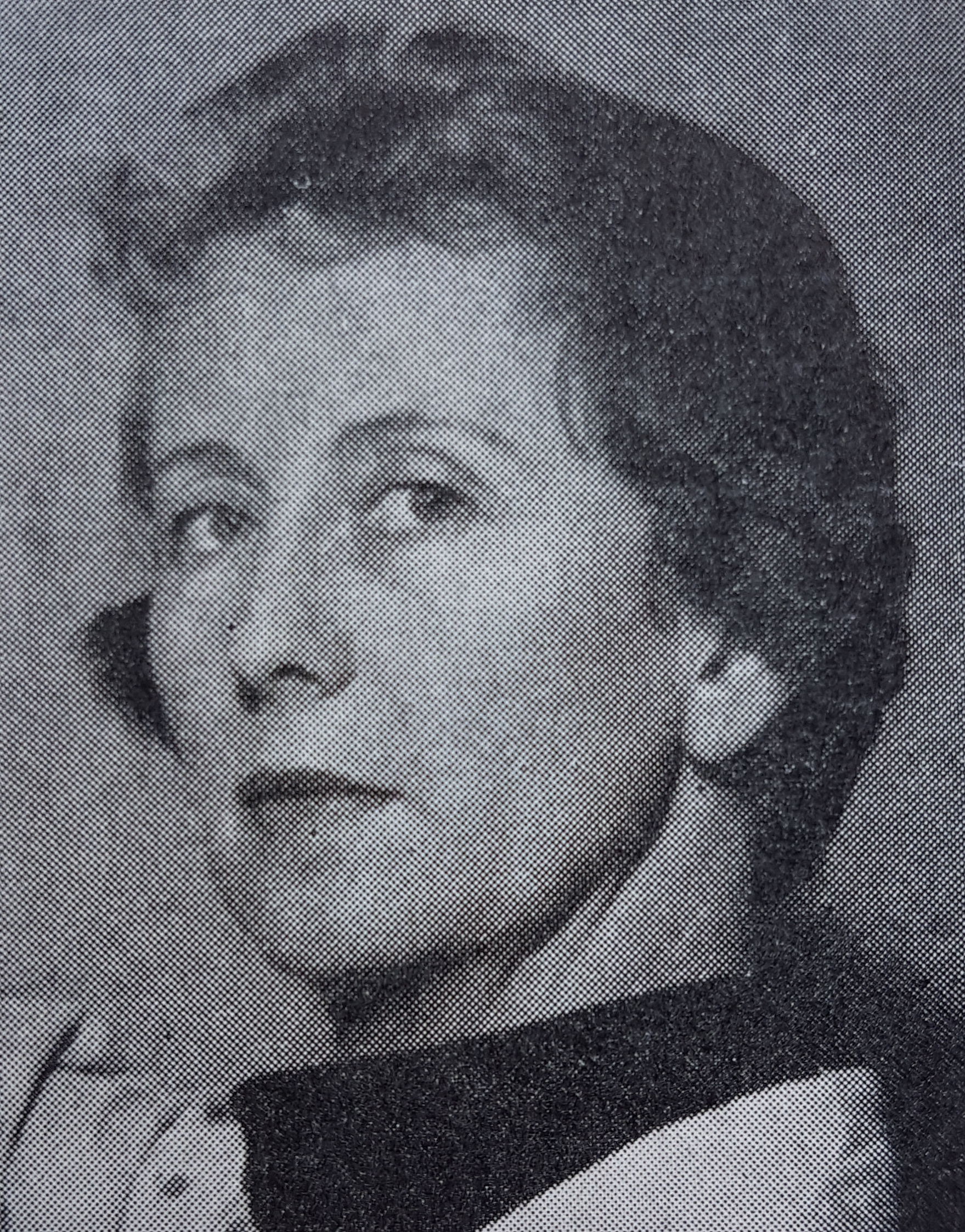
- Advocaat in an unknown date
- Born: 17 August 1912; Kristiania, Norway
- Died: 26 July 1997 (aged 84); Oslo, Norway
- Occupation: painter
- Spouses: Ole Fredrik Hvinden Haug (m. 1940; died 1941) Øistein Thurman (m. 1959; died 1988)
- Relatives: Jacob Hvinden Haug (father-in-law)

Gunnvor Advocaat (17 August 1912 – 26 July 1997) was a Norwegian painter. She was regarded among the pioneers of abstract painting in Norway.

== Biography ==
Gunnvor Henriette Advocaat was born in Kristiania (now Oslo), Norway to Dutch ambassador Gijsbert Diedrik Advocaat and Gunnvor Katharina Eckbo. She was first married to conservator-restorer Ole Fredrik Hvinden Haug (1913–1941) who died only months after their marriage. In 1959 she married artist Øistein Thurman (1922–1988).

In 1937 she became a student at a drawing and painting school in the Netherlands, and attended the Art Academy at The Hague 1938–39. She settled in Oslo in 1939. In 1941, she continued his studies in Oslo at the painting school of Doro Ording (1901-1993). She attended the Norwegian National Academy of Craft and Art Industry 1942–43 and at the Norwegian National Academy of Fine Arts 1943–48. In 1948, she made her debut at the Autumn Exhibition in Oslo.

Her works represented in the Norwegian Museum of Contemporary Art include the paintings Komposisjon (1966) and Gult over sort (1974). She is also represented in the Museum of Modern Art in New York City, in the Nationalmuseum in Stockholm and other galleries.
