= Arild Nyquist =

Norwegian writer and musician (1937–2004)

- Born: 6 March 1937; Oslo, Norway
- Died: 21 December 2004 (aged 67); Asker
- Occupations: Novelist; Poet; Children's writer Musician
- Mother: Gerd Nyquist
- Relatives: Olav Mosebekk (father-in-law)

Arild Nyquist (6 March 1937 – 21 December 2004) was a Norwegian novelist, poet, writer of children's books and musician.

He was born in Oslo, the son of Arild Otto Nyquist (1911–74) and Gerd Nyquist (1913–84). His father was a shipbroker and his mother a novelist. He grew up on Røa just outside Oslo. At the age of 23, Nyquist began working at the Norwegian National Academy of Craft and Art Industry to train as an artist. However this education was interrupted. He was employed as a formation teacher at a primary school at Stamsund in Lofoten (1968–1976). In 1960, he married Anne-Kari Mosebekk, daughter of artist Olav Mosebekk (1910–2001).

He made his literary debut in 1963 with the novel Ringer i et sommervann. Nyquist was awarded Mads Wiel Nygaards Endowment in 1971. He was nominated for the Nordic Council's Literature Prize in 1994 for the self-biographic novel Ungdom.

He died in Asker on 21 December 2004.

== Selected works ==
- Nå er det jul igjen! og andre dikt (1972)
- Kelner! (1979)
- Havet. Et dikt om livet og døden (1985)
- I avisen (1981)
- Reisen til Drammen (1982)
- Flyvende fru Rosenkranz (1983)
- Jeg heter Arild (1990)
- Knapphuset (1995)
