= Dagny Hald =

Norwegian ceramist and illustrator

- Born: 17 April 1936; Bærum, Norway
- Died: 6 September 2001 (aged 65)
- Occupation(s): Ceramist and illistrator
- Spouse: Finn Hald
- Father: Axel Revold
- Awards: Jacob Prize (1981)

Dagny Hald (17 April 1936 – 6 September 2001) was a Norwegian ceramist and illustrator. She was born in Bærum, the daughter of Axel Revold. She is represented with works at the National Gallery of Norway, at the Victoria and Albert Museum in London, and other galleries. Among her books are Mellom to stoler from 1980, Sidespor from 1986 and Oppsving from 1996, all in collaboration with her husband Finn Hald and designer Roar Høyland.

She was awarded the Jacob Prize in 1981, jointly with Finn Hald.
