= Finn Hald =

Norwegian visual artist

- Born: 8 July 1929
- Died: 17 October 2010 (aged 81)
- Occupations: Ceramist, sculptor, illustrator, poet and playwright
- Spouse: Dagny Hald
- Awards: Jacob Prize (1981)

Finn Hald (8 July 1929 – 17 October 2010) was a Norwegian ceramist, sculptor, illustrator, poet and playwright. He was married to Dagny Revold. Among his books are Revestreker from 1970 and the short story collection Fuglesirkuset from 1978. He published Mellom to stoler from 1980, Sidespor from 1986 and Oppsving from 1996, all in collaboration with his wife Dagny Hald and designer Roar Høyland.

He was awarded the Jacob Prize in 1981, jointly with Dagny Hald.
