= Bodil Cappelen =

Norwegian artist, writer (1930–2026)

Bodil Cappelen (April 26, 1930 – September 14, 2026) was a Norwegian painter, textile artist and book illustrator. She also wrote children's books.

== Early life ==
Cappelen was born in Stavanger on April 26, 1930, the daughter of Johan Munthe Cappelen from Oslo and Edith Heiberg from Leikanger Municipality. Her father was a judge and was known for his dissenting opinion in the acquittal of Police Chief Knut Rød after the Second World War. Bodil grew up with two sisters: Lotte Cappelen Thiis and Eli Heiberg. She attended the Norwegian National Academy of Craft and Art Industry from 1948 to 1951.

== Career and work ==
From 1977 to 1997 Cappelen was supported by a government guaranteed income for artists.

In the 1970s Cappelen had many solo exhibitions of tapestries, and between 1968 and 1982 she also participated many times in the Southern Norway Exhibition (Sørlandsutstillingen), the Western Norway Exhibition (Vestlandsutstillingen), and the Autumn Exhibition with tapestries.

After her last solo exhibition at the Artists' House gallery in 1981, Cappelen decided to illustrate children's books. She illustrated five books for the Sami publisher Davvi Girji in Karasjok Municipality, with two of them featuring her own text. She also illustrated the book Norske barnerim og regler (Norwegian Children's Rhymes and Songs; Aschehoug 1984). In cooperation with Olav H. Hauge, she published the primer ABC, with editions appearing in 1986, 1987, 1995, and 2008.

In 1991, Cappelen had her first solo exhibition of oil paintings, at the Nota Bene Gallery in Oslo. After that she had had many exhibitions of her paintings and she was still producing paintings. In 1998, Cappelen moved to the town of Son.

Bodil Cappelen cited Eugène Delacroix's saying as her own motto: “The first merit of a painting is to be a feast for the eye.”

Cappelen was a member of the Norwegian Visual Artists Association (Norske billedkunstnere, NBK) and the Association of Norwegian Painters (Landsforeningen Norske Malere, KNM). Cappelen's art has been purchased by the Bergen Art Gallery (Bergen Billedgalleri), the Norwegian Arts Council, and several public buildings.

== Personal life and death ==
Cappelen's first marriage was to the author and painter Finn Strømsted. The couple had two children, Aili Strømsted and Rune Cappelen Strømsted. From 1975 to 1994, Cappelen first lived with and then married the poet Olav H. Hauge in Ulvik Municipality in Hardanger. They were married on January 27, 1978.

Cappelen died on September 14, 2026, at the age of 96.

== Solo exhibitions ==
- 1972: Young Artists Society, tapestry
- 1981: Bergen Art Society, tapestry
- 1981: Faorese Art Society (Listafélag Førøya), Faroe Islands, tapestry
- 1981: Artists House, Oslo, tapestry
- 1991: Nota Bene Gallery, Oslo, paintings
- 1992: Kolibri Hallery, Haugesund, paintings
- 1992: Hardanger Folk Museum, paintings
- 1997: Hjadlane Gallery, Osa, paintings
- 2000: Gallery X, Son, paintings
- 2003: Næs Iron Works Museum, Ti malerier av ovnsplatemotiver fra 1600-tallet (Ten Paintings of Spark Screen Designs from the 1600s)
- 2004: Moss Town and Industry Museum. Vintervarme. Fra jernverk til kunstverk (Winter Heat: From Iron Works to Artworks)
- 2006: Tromsø Museum, 70 illustrations from Sami children's books

== Awards ==
2012: Anvil Award (Norwegian: Amboltprisen)

== Bibliography ==
- Pingvinen Po (Po the Penguin; also published in Lule Sami and Southern Sami), picture book (1993)
  - Pinviidna Pu (1993)
- Modige Marja (Courageous Marja; also published in Lule Sami and Southern Sami), picture book (1994)
  - Jálos Márjá (1994)
- Brev 1970–1975. Olav H. Hauge og Bodil Cappelen (Letters 1970–1975. Olav H. Hauge and Bodil Cappelen), biography and memoir (1996)
