= Knut Rød =

Norwegian police prosecutor

Knut Rød (30 June 1900 – 19 May 1986) was a Norwegian police prosecutor responsible for the arrest, detention and transfer of Jewish men, women and children to SS troops at Oslo harbor. For these and other actions related to the Holocaust in Norway, Rød was acquitted in two highly publicized trials during the legal purge in Norway after World War II that remain controversial to this day. The trials and their outcome have since been dubbed the "strangest trial in post-war Norway."

== Background ==
Rød was born in Kristiania (today's Oslo) in 1900 and earned his law degree in 1927. He was immediately hired into the police department in Aker, serving under Johan Søhr, who was noted in his time for opposing the admission of Jewish refugees into Norway during World War I and for vilifying shechita (slaughter of animals in accordance with Jewish law). He was promoted to detective ("kriminalbetjent") in 1929 and to lieutenant ("førstebetjent") in 1937. When the police departments in Aker and Oslo were merged in 1940, he was transferred to the surveillance desk. He became a member of Nasjonal Samling (NS) on 4 January 1941, well after the German invasion of Norway.

Rød joined the newly established Statspolitiet ("state police") and became the administrative head of the Oslo section. For reasons and under circumstances that remain unclear, Rød resigned from the state police in September 1943 and his membership in NS on 30 September 1943.

== Career in Statspolitiet ==
In the fall of 1941, Jonas Lie, the commissioned police minister in the Terboven administration, established Statspolitiet, consisting of several merged surveillance sections throughout the country. The force was initially 150 men strong and was under the command of Karl Marthinsen. Marthinsen was under the direct command of German authorities independently of Lie. All but four of the police officers in this group were members of NS. For the purposes of the operations related to the Holocaust, Rød was Martinsen's executive officer who acted on his authority in crucial moments.

== Identifying, arrests, detention, and deportation of Jews ==
The identifying, arrest, detention, deportation, and ultimate murder of Jews in Norway was effected through several steps. As a member of Statspolitiet, Rød participated in the arrest of Jewish men in and around Oslo on 26 October 1942, and in the confiscation of Jewish property at the same time. However, he was given field command authority for the police action on 25 and 26 November 1942, in which 532 Jews were forced on board the cargo ship SS Donau and sent via the port of Stettin (now Szczecin, Poland) to Auschwitz, where all but eight perished.

The ground operations were complex and had to be planned and executed on one day's notice. Under Martinsen and Rød's command, his section made up lists of Jewish women, children, patients, and elderly who were not yet arrested and detained. He organized 100 squads, each consisting of a police officer, a squad leader and two assistants, typically Hird members, SS soldiers, or other police officers. A taxi was requisitioned for each squad. Each squad was given a list of four addresses. The plan was that each member would arrest and detain a family, and the taxi would take each family to the pier in turn. At 4:30 am, 100 taxis (half of the entire fleet of taxis in Oslo and Aker) were parked outside the police station in the Majorstuen section of Oslo.

Statspolitiet made a head start on this mission the night before by arresting Jewish patients at hospitals, psychiatric institutions, nursing homes, etc. Although doctors often protested, seriously ill patients were transported to the pier and put on board the ship.

== Trials ==
After the liberation of Norway, Rød was arrested on 14 May 1945 and imprisoned at Ilebu prison, which was known as Grini concentration camp during the Nazi regime. He was charged with several violations, among them §86, providing comfort to the enemy; and the treason ordinances (landssvikandordningen) passed during the war and §223 of the penal code (against kidnapping, though this was not included in the retrial). Although few of the facts were in dispute, he was acquitted on 4 February 1946, against the objection of the professional judge, Johan Munthe Cappelen. Three separate arguments were made in Rød's defence:

1. Cover - Rød's defence claimed that he had been a double agent for the Norwegian resistance movement, and that his cover would have been compromised, preventing him from performing more important work for the resistance. This was based on witness testimony by other police officers who had been involved in the arrest and deportation. It appeared likely that Rød in fact had passed information to resistance members within the police department, but there is no evidence he did this to warn the Jews or the resistance of the pending arrest and deportation.
2. Coercion - as was the case with many officials involved with the Holocaust, Rød claimed that he had no real choice in the matter. The defense argued that if he had refused to obey orders from his superiors, he would have been subject to arrest and possible deportation himself.
3. Professionalism - Rød's defense maintained that his responsibilities had been limited to "technical" police work that he had performed conscientiously and in a humane manner.

The majority of the trial's panel found that Rød had been put in a difficult position during these events, and that his judgment in participation in the "technical" aspects of the actions was justified. Rød had argued that he had conducted the arrests in a "humane" manner, and that his participation had prevented German police from taking over the Norwegian police authority and doing greater harm. The court also accepted the "camouflage" argument, namely that Rød's cover as a collaborating police officer, would have been jeopardized had he resisted the order to arrest and transfer the Jews. The lone dissenting judge, judge Cappelen, noted that "there is nothing that indicates that the accused - as he stood before these crimes - had patriotic duties of such importance and that were so closely tied to his role in the state police that his leading participation in the arrest of Jews can be justified."

The acquittal was vacated on appeal and the case was retried on 9 April 1948. He was again acquitted, this time by a unanimous panel.

Rød applied to be reinstated in the police but was rejected. He sued and prevailed, with the city court in Oslo ordering him to be reinstated in the Oslo police department. The Oslo police and Norwegian department of Justice appealed to the Supreme Court of Norway, but were overruled. On 15 April 1950, the police in Oslo sent a "cool" letter to Rød, "noting" that he was to resume his duties on June 1 that year at 9 am.

No credible evidence was presented at either of these trials to support Rød's contention that he had done anything to warn Jews about their pending arrest and deportation. Although the resistance had infiltrated virtually every police agency in Norway, they only found out about the deportation late on 25 November.

In its acquittal, the court said that Rød's action "were necessary in order for him to perform the other, far, more important resistance work. He has the entire time pursued his plan to damage the enemy and benefit his countrymen. The accused is therefore acquitted."

=== Defence minister showing to justice minister a classified document about Rød ===
On 13 March 1947 defence minister Hauge showed a document to justice minister Gundersen, regarding Knut Rød—who was preparing for trial in the appellate court. The document was a five-day-old report to Vilhelm Evang, then chief of the Intelligence Service, about Rød's participation in a group that collected intelligence on communists and sympathizers; and about Rød having accepted Norwegian kroner 500 for locating the election lists for the Norwegian Communist Party—pertaining to the last election of parliament and the municipal governments; and about Rød having recruited his brother, for the work [of the group]. (His brother was then a secretary in Kommunikasjonsdirektoratet—a government agency.)

Olav Njølstad says that "Before the Rød Case continued, the Defence- and Justice Minister knew that the defendant was concerned about the communist threat and could become a useful man in the communist surveillance that they had started constructing - that is, under the condition that he would not be convicted of collaboration with the Axis Powers during World War II, and fired from the police force.

== Aftermath ==
A professor of law and criminology, Knut Sveri, wrote an article on the case against Rød on the occasion of Johs. Andenæs's 70th birthday, titled "Landssvikoppgjørets merkeligste rettssak," ("the strangest trial in the post-war treason trials"), that questioned the judicial motivation(s) of the jury in two trials, in believing that any circumstances could have justified contributing to the murder of hundreds of Jews, in what has been referred to as the "greatest crime in Norway during World War II."

On 26 November 2006, the Norwegian Center for Studies of Holocaust and Religious Minorities put on permanent display a statue of Rød by the sculptor Victor Lind; Rød is depicted wearing a Nazi uniform, his arm raised in a "Sieg Heil" salute. The center also held a symposium on the issue, concluding that Jews were considered outside the collective - before, during, and after the war - to the extent that Norwegians thought the deportation somehow was an external matter.

Following this, a Norwegian Supreme Court justice, Georg Fr. Rieber-Mohn, published on 14 February 2007 an op-ed piece in Dagbladet where he found that the acquittal was appropriate on a strictly legal basis, because, in order for §86 - giving aid and comfort to the enemy - to apply, the totality of the defendant's actions had to be considered; and in this case the panel felt that Rød's assistance to the resistance under cover of being a police officer for the Nazis outweighed the damage he had done by deporting the Jews. This resulted in a further debate about whether Rød's assistance to the resistance, outweighed his role in the deportations, in reference to culpability according to § 86.

In late October 2008, Olav Njølstad, Jens Chr Hauge's biographer revealed that Rød had been recruited in the immediate aftermath of the war to register communists and their sympathizers. The possibility was thereby raised that Hauge or other influential Norwegians influenced the outcome of the trials against Rød, to keep him in the police force, where he could continue his surveillance.
