= Chrix Dahl =

Norwegian painter and illustrator

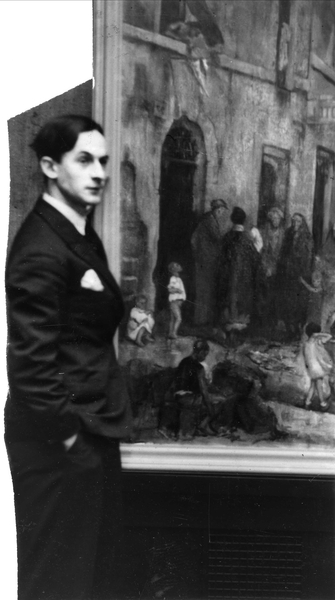
- Dahl ca. 1935
- Born: Christian Axel Dahl; 5 January 1906; Kristiania, Norway (now Oslo)
- Died: 16 June 1994 (aged 88)
- Education: Norwegian National Academy of Craft and Art Industry; Norwegian National Academy of Fine Arts
- Occupations: Painter and illustrator
- Awards: Order of St. Olav

Chrix Dahl (5 January 1906 – 16 June 1994) was a Norwegian painter and illustrator.

== Biography ==
Christian Axel Dahl was born in Kristiania (now Oslo) Norway. He was the eldest son of Christian Axel Dahl (1878–1918), a naval officer, and Elise Augusta Steen (1879–1952). Dahl grew up in Vestre Aker. He attended Skøyen School and took artium at Frogner School. He studied at the Norwegian National Academy of Craft and Art Industry (1924–25) under Eivind Nielsen, at the Norwegian National Academy of Fine Arts under Axel Revold and Halfdan Strøm (1925–27) and under Olaf Willums (1929–32).

Dahl traveled through southern Europe, including Venice in 1929.

He made his exhibition debut at Blomqvist in Oslo during 1930. Dahl was a teacher at the Norwegian National Academy of Craft and Art Industry from 1945 to 1974. He was a member of the Norske Grafikere, serving as secretary 1938-46 and as chairman 1946–53. He was a board member of the Oslo Kunstforening and board member of the Kunstnernes Hus in Oslo 1946–57. His illustrations include books by Bjørnstjerne Bjørnson, Henrik Wergeland, Mark Twain, Jules Verne and Stefan Zweig.

In 1979, Dahl was made a Knight 1st Class in the Order of St. Olav. Dahl died during 1994 at age 88. He was buried at Ullern Cemetery (Ullern kirkegård) in Oslo. He is represented with several works at the National Gallery of Norway including Napolitansk gårdsrom, Piazzale Mercato (1932), På broen (1932), Gjøglerfamilie (1933) and Selvportrett (1933).
