= Odd Solumsmoen =

Norwegian novelist and literary critic

- Born: 6 June 1917; Hamar, Norway
- Died: 30 April 1986 (aged 68)
- Occupations: Novelist and literary critic
- Awards: Mads Wiel Nygaards Endowment (1972)

Odd Solumsmoen (6 June 1917 – 30 April 1986) was a Norwegian novelist and literary critic.

== Biography ==
Solumsmoen was born at Hamar in Hedmark, Norway. His parents were Torger Solumsmoen (1886-1923) and Mathilde Gren (1885-1967). His father died when he was only six years old. He graduated in 1939 from Hamar Cathedral School. In 1946, he was appointed to a position at Hamar ligningskontor, a post he held until retirement and which he combined with his work as an author and critic. He became a regular contributor to Arbeiderbladet from the early 1950s until the 1980s.

He debuted as a fictional author in 1943 with the novel Barn i søndagsskolen. The book attracted considerable attention in his hometown since the stories so clearly started from recognizable events and models. His later works also had an autobiographical starting point. Solumsmoen's biographic works include a monograph on writer and painter Cora Sandel (Cora Sandel. En dikter i ånd og sannhet, 1957) and on poet and author Kristofer Uppdal (Kristofer Uppdal – domkirkebyggeren, 1959). Both are characterized by the personalization of the two authors. Among his other works was the novel Hjem, kjære hjem from 1955. Solumsmoen was awarded the Mads Wiel Nygaards Endowment in 1972.
