= Kåre Prytz =

Norwegian writer

Harald Kåre Prytz (12 September 1926 – 6 July 1994) was a Norwegian journalist and novelist.

He was born in Ålen Municipality, belonging to the Prytz family from Røros Municipality.

He became editor-in-chief of Arbeidets Rett at the age of 19 before working in Hamar Arbeiderblad from 1951 to his retirement. He wrote several novels, mainly revolving around the Norse travels to Vinland and East Greenland. He received the prize Mads Wiel Nygaards Endowment in 1972. He also wrote the nonfiction book Westward before Columbus in 1991.

He died in July 1994.
