= Norwegian National Academy of Craft and Art Industry =

College in Oslo, Norway

Coordinates: 59°55′06″N 10°44′35″E

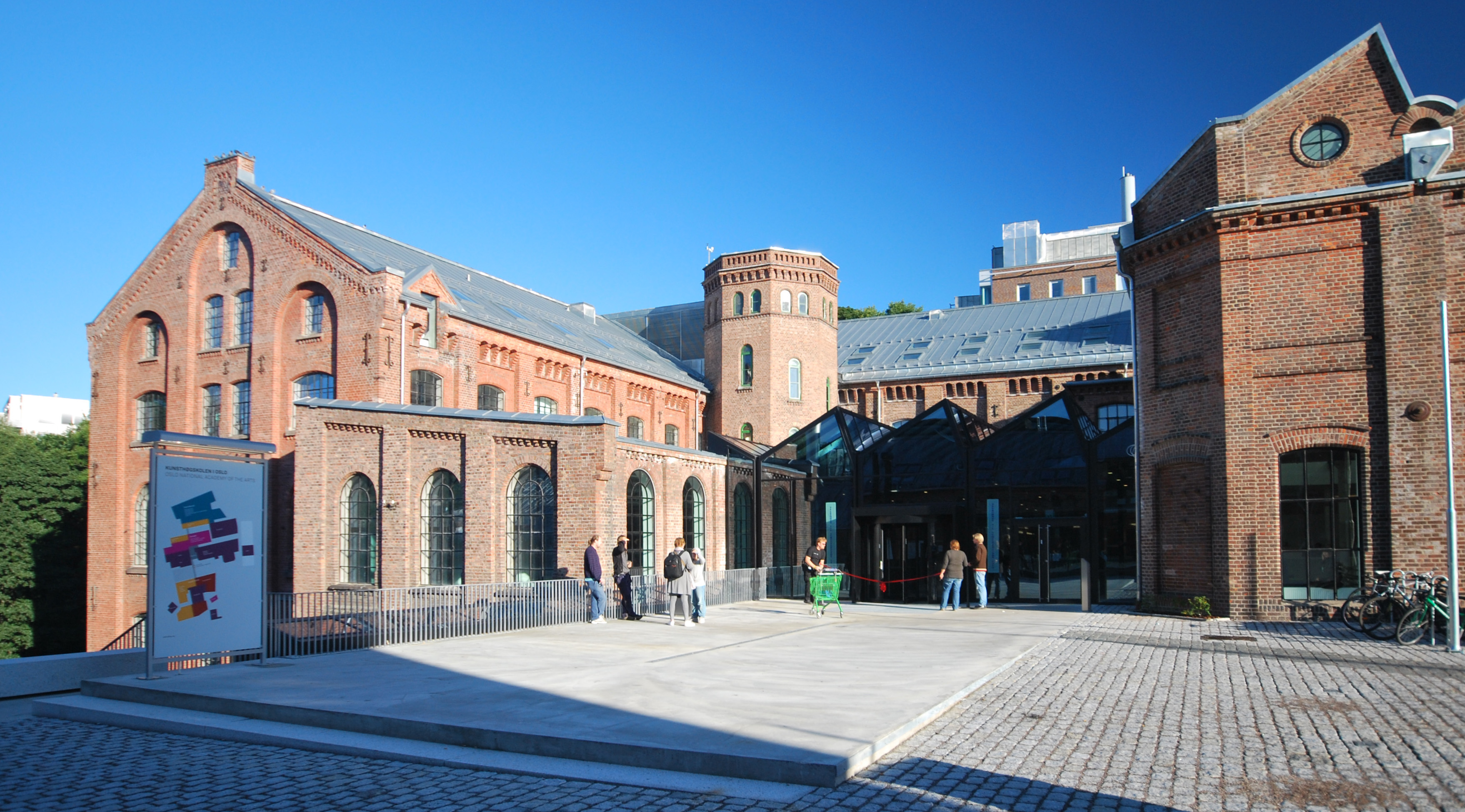
Oslo National Academy of the Arts at Grünerløkka

The National College of Art and Design (Norwegian: Statens håndverks- og kunstindustriskole) is a tertiary institution in Norway established in 1818.

In 1996, the National College of Art and Design became part of Oslo National Academy of the Arts (Kunsthøgskolen i Oslo, KHiO), along with the Norwegian National Academy of Fine Arts, Norwegian National Academy of Opera, the Norwegian National Academy of Ballet, and the National Academy of Theatre (Statens teaterhøgskole).

== Noted alumni ==
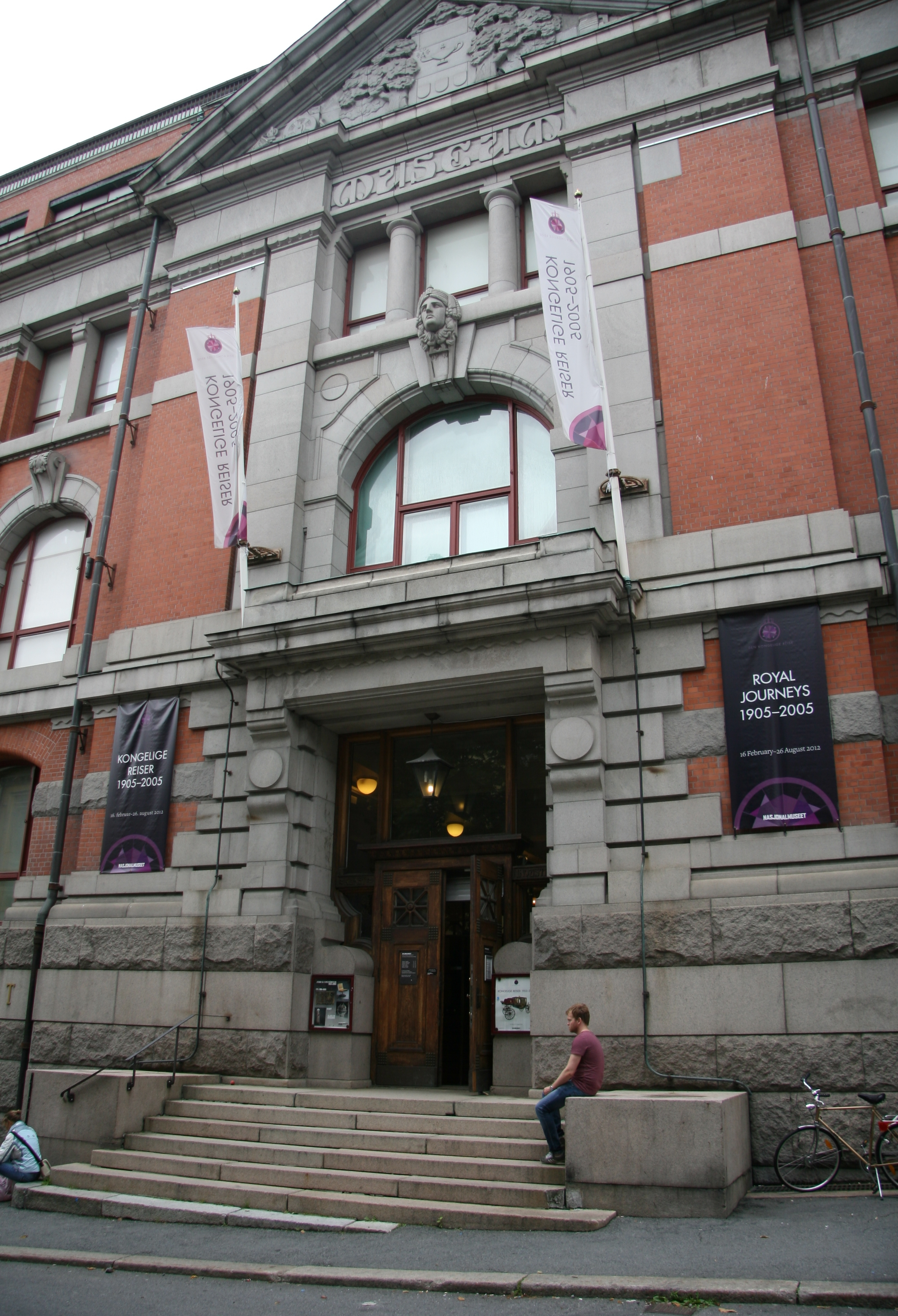
The school (now a museum) in 2012

=== Visual artists ===
- Thomas Fearnley (1802–1842), painter
- Peder Balke (1804–87), painter
- Jorgen Dreyer (1877–1948), sculptor
- Hans Hansen (1820–1858), sculptor
- Johan Fredrik Eckersberg (1822–1870), painter
- Hans Fredrik Gude (1825–1903), painter
- Lars Hertervig (1830–1902), painter
- Jacob Wilhelm Nordan 1824–1892, architect
- Gerhard Munthe (1849–1929), painter and draftsman
- Betzy Akersloot-Berg (1850–1922), seascape painter
- Eilif Peterssen (born 1852), painter and draftsman
- Christian Krohg (1852–1925), painter and writer
- Ivar Throndsen (1853–1932), engraver
- Erik Werenskiold (1855–1938), painter and draftsman
- Hans Heyerdahl (1857–1913), painter
- Gustav Wentzel (1859–1927), painter
- Lars Jonson Haukaness (1863–1929), painter
- Nikolai Austrup (1880–1928), painter and graphic artist
- Edvard Munch (1863–1944), painter and graphic artist
- Emil Biorn (1864–1935), Norwegian-American sculptor and painter
- Thorolf Holmboe (1866–1935), painter, illustrator and designer
- Yngvar Sonnichsen (1873–1938), Norwegian American artist
- Ludvig Karsten (1876–1926), painter
- Halfdan Egedius (1877–1899), painter
- Enevold Thømt (1878–1958), painter
- Wilhelm Rasmussen (1879–1965), sculptor
- Torleif S. Knaphus (1881–1965), sculptor
- Henrik Sørensen (1882–1962), painter
- Axel Revold (1887–1962), painter
- Anne Grimdalen (1899–1961), sculptor
- Erling Enger (1899–1990), painter
- Dyre Vaa (1903–1980), sculptor
- Olav Halse (1903–1981), painter
- Kaare Bratung (1906–1985), cartoonist
- Chrix Dahl (1906–1994), graphic artist and draftsman
- Kaare Espolin Johnson (1907–1994), visual artist and illustrator
- Kai Fjell (1907–1989), painter, graphic artist and scenographer
- Ferdinand Finne (1910–1999), graphic artist and writer
- Borghild Rud (1910–1999), draftsman
- Olav Mosebekk, (1910–2001), draftsman and painter
- Bendik Riis (1911–1988), draftsman and painter
- Jørleif Uthaug (1911–1990), artist and sculptor, created Amphitrite
- Gunnvor Advocaat (1912–1997), painter
- Knut Monrad (1913–1987), painter
- Guy Krohg (1917–1998), painter
- Ørnulf Ranheimsæter (born 1919), draftsman and graphic artist
- Victor Sparre (born 1919), painter and glass designer
- Ludvig Eikaas (born 1920), painter and graphic artist
- Carl Nesjar (born 1920), visual artist
- Omar Andréen (1922–), draftsman and graphic artist
- Else Marie Jakobsen (born 1922), designer and textile artist
- Kåre Tveter (born 1922), painter
- Ivar Jerven (1924–1994), graphic artist
- Liv Nergaard (born 1924), painter and sculptor
- Finn Henrik Bodvin (1928–2002), sculptor
- Fritz Røed (1928–2002), sculptor
- Haakon Bleken (1929–), painter
- Kjerstin Øvrelid (1929–1989), painter
- Bodil Cappelen (born 1930), painter
- Bjørg Lødøen (1931–2009), painter, visual artist
- Iver Jåks (1932–), Sami artist
- Kjartan Slettemark (1932–), visual artist
- Per Ung (born 1933), sculptor and graphic artist
- Rolf Aamot (born 1934), painter, visual artist, film director
- Dagny Hald (1936–2001), ceramist sculptor
- Hans Normann Dahl, (1937–), painter, draftsman, graphic artist
- Bjørn Ransve (born 1944), painter

=== Designers, illustrators, architects, and others ===
- Christian H. Grosch (1801–1865), architect
- Herman Backer (1856–1932), architect
- Henry Bucher (1864–1944), architect
- Olaf Gulbransson (1873–1958), draftsman and illustrator
- Arthur David-Andersen (1875–1970), goldsmith
- Einar Oscar Schou (1877–1966), architect
- Arnstein Arneberg (1882–1961), architect
- Andreas Bjercke (1883–1967), architect
- Gerhard Fischer (1890–1977), architect, and archaeologist
- Hallvard Trætteberg (1898–1987), heraldry
- Sigrun Berg (1901–1982), weaver and textile designer
- Knut Knutsen (1903–1969), architect
- Thorbjørn Egner (1912–1990), writer, songwriter, and draftsman
- Fredrik Henrik Stabel (1914–2001), draftsman, newspaper illustrator, writer
- Ulf Aas (1918–), illustrator
- Salo Grenning (Pedro) (1918–1986), draftsman, newspaper illustrator
- Kjell Aukrust (1920–2002), writer and illustrator
- Odd Børretzen (1926–), writer
- Unni-Lise Jonsmoen (1936–), illustrator and writer
- Arild Nyquist (1937–2004), writer
- Finn Graff (1938–), draftsman, newspaper illustrator
- Per Spook (1939–), fashion designer
- Vivian Zahl Olsen (1942–), illustrator
- Kjersti Scheen (1943–), writer and illustrator
- Inge Grødum (1943–), draftsman, newspaper illustrator
- Torill Thorstad Hauger (born 1943), writer and visual artist
- Kjersti Scheen (born 1943), writer and illustrator
- Ellen Auensen (1944–), draftsman
- Fam Ekman (born 1946), visual artist, illustrator, writer
- Reidar Finsrud (born 1946), artist
- Akin Düzakin (born 1961), illustrator
- Svein and Egil Nyhus (1962–), illustrators
- Christopher Nielsen (1963–), comic artist
- John Arne Sæterøy (Jason) (1965–), comic artist
- Siri Dokken (1966–), illustrator
