= Southern Norway Exhibition =

Norwegian contemporary art exhibition

The Southern Norway Exhibition (Norwegian: Sørlandsutstillingen) is an annual traveling exhibition of Norwegian contemporary art. It is open to visual artists from Southern Norway (Vest-Agder and Aust-Agder counties) plus Telemark county.

The first Southern Norway Exhibition opened on January 4, 1969. The exhibition was set up at the initiative of the painters Bjørn Krogstad and Øyvind Brune in 1968. After making thorough preparations, they contacted the Kristiansand Art Association (Norwegian: Christianssands Kunstforening) and by May 1968 had arranged the rules for how the exhibition should be organized and carried out the following year. Among other accomplishments, Krogstad and Brune established an economic foundation for the exhibition by having it included in the budget of the Norway Arts Council.

According to the statute of the Southern Norway Exhibition, the exhibition's founders are the following:

- The Telemark Visual Artists Association (Billedkunstnere i Telemark, BiT)
- The Agder Norwegian Visual Artists Association (Norske Billedkunstnere Agder, NBK-A)
- The Skien Art Association (Skiens Kunstforening)
- The Arendal Art Association (Arendal Kunstforening)
- The Kristiansand Art Association (Christianssands Kunstforening)

Other regional exhibitions are the Eastern Norway Exhibition (Østlandsutstillingen), the Central Norway Exhibition (Den midtnorske kunstutstilling), the Western Norway Exhibition (Vestlandsutstillingen), and the Northern Norway Exhibition (Den Nord-Norske Kunstutstilling). These play a strong role in Norway's artistic milieu alongside the annual nationwide Autumn Exhibition in Oslo.
