= Axel Revold =

Norwegian painter (1887–1962)

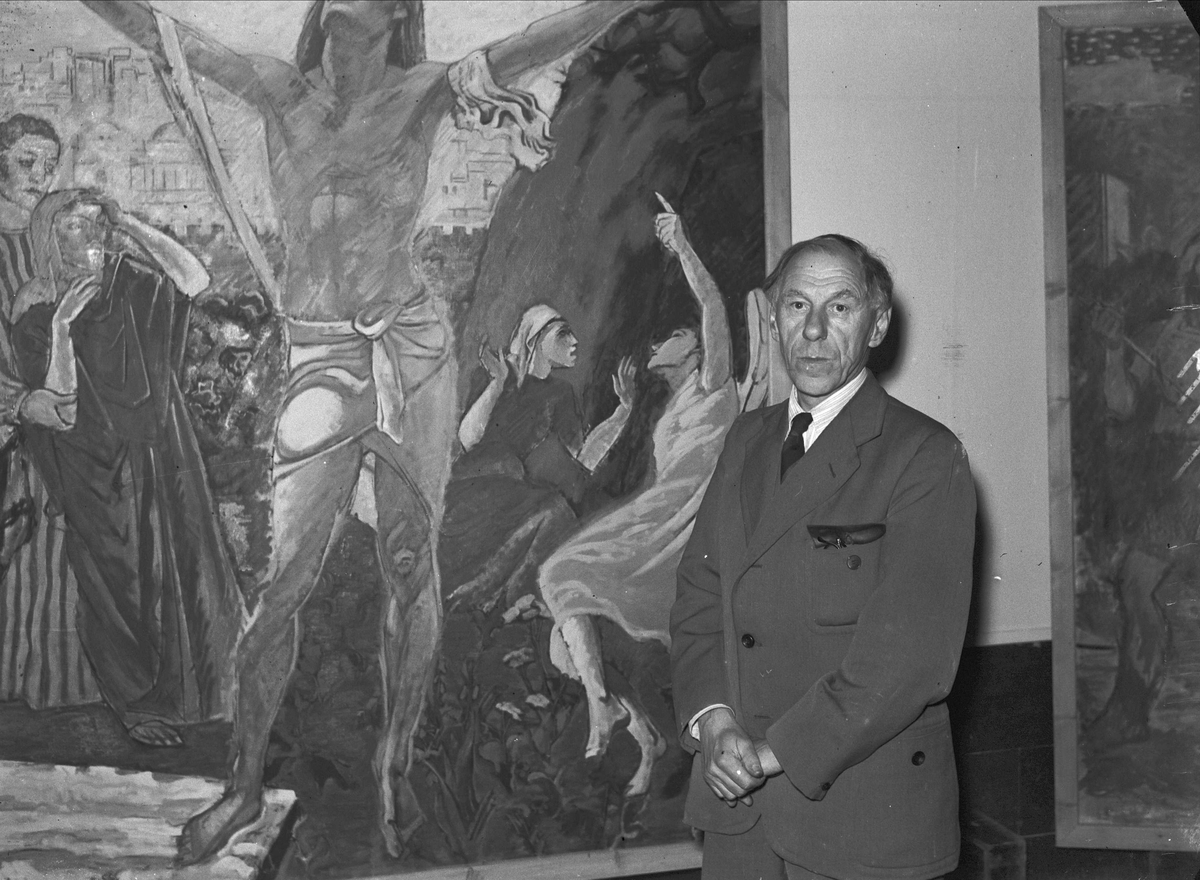
- Axel Revold at the Kunstnerforbundet in Oslo (1946)
- Born: 24 December 1887; Ålesund Municipality
- Died: 11 April 1962 (aged 74); Bærum Municipality
- Children: Dagny Hald
- Relatives: Fridtjof Nansen (father-in-law); Eva Nansen (mother-in-law)
- Awards: Prince Eugen Medal (1955); Order of St. Olav; Order of the Dannebrog; Order of the Polar Star; Order of the White Rose; Legion of Honor

Axel Revold (24 December 1887 – 11 April 1962) was a Norwegian painter, illustrator, and art professor at the Norwegian National Academy of Fine Arts for twenty years. He was highly decorated for his merits.

== Personal life ==
Revold was born on 24 December 1887 in Ålesund as the son of merchant Julius Revold and Johanne Hjelpsten. He was married to Ingrid Müller from 1915 to 1928. From 1929 he was married to painter Irmelin Nansen, the daughter of Fridtjof Nansen and Eva Nansen. He was the father of artist Dagny Hald, and father-in-law of Finn Hald. He died in Bærum in 1962.

== Career ==
Revold initiated engineering studies in Kristiania in 1906, and also followed evening courses at Den kgl. Tegneskole in Kristiania. In 1908 he discontinued his engineering education and moved to Paris as a student of Henri Matisse for two years. He was also inspired by Paul Cézanne and Kees van Dongen.

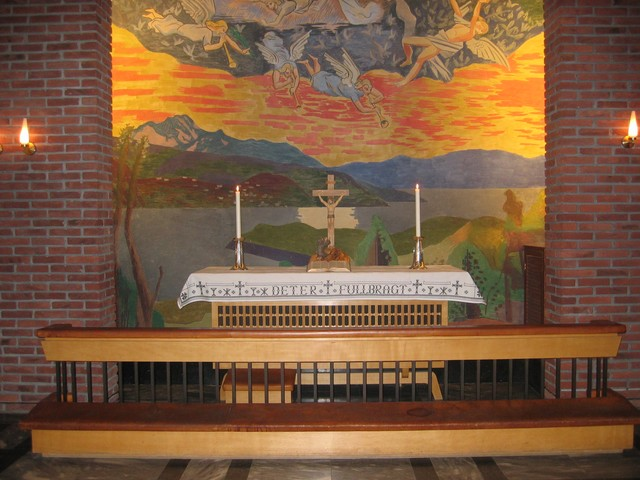
Altar piece by Axel Revold

Among Revold's paintings are Apasjer from 1912 and Fiskere på Middelhavet from 1914. He is represented in National Gallery of Norway with more than twenty paintings, including Italienerinne from 1913, Fiskevær from 1916, Morgen from 1927 and Fiskerflåten drar ut from 1935. His painting Kongens hjemkomst from 1945 is located at the Royal Palace in Oslo. He also painted frescos and decorated churches. He contributed to the decoration of the Oslo City Hall. His book illustrations include Johan Bojer's book Den siste viking.

Revold was appointed professor at the Norwegian National Academy of Fine Arts from 1925 to 1946. In 1941, during the occupation of Norway by Nazi Germany, Revold had to leave the academy. Together with fellow professor Jean Heiberg they were secretly running an undercover art academy in Oslo. Their academy was called "The Factory" (Norwegian: Fabrikken), after its first location in a closed corset factory. They were later located at Lauritz Falk's home and at Johannes Sejersted Bødtker's atelier at Holmenkollen.

In 1955 he was awarded the Prince Eugen Medal and decorated Commander of the Royal Norwegian Order of St. Olav. He was a Commander of the Danish Order of the Dannebrog, the Swedish Order of the Polar Star, and the Finnish Order of the White Rose. He was Officer of the French l'Instruction Publique, and a Knight of the Legion of Honour.
