= Finn Strømsted =

Norwegian poet and graphical artist

Finn Strømsted (9 June 1925 – 4 July 2003) was a Norwegian poet and visual artist. He made his literary debut in 1956 with the poetry collection Angelicafløyten. Among his other collections are Bidevind from 1961, Susquehanna Blues from 1971, and En fugl har tent meg from 1995.

He was awarded Mads Wiel Nygaards Endowment in 1973.

Awards
Preceded by Finn Havrevold, Kåre Prytz, Odd Solumsmoen and Bjørn Gunnar Olsen	Recipient of the Mads Wiel Nygaard's Endowment; 1973	Succeeded by Hans Børli
