= Høstutstillingen =

Art exhibition in Oslo, Norway

Coordinates: 59.9194°N 10.7308°E

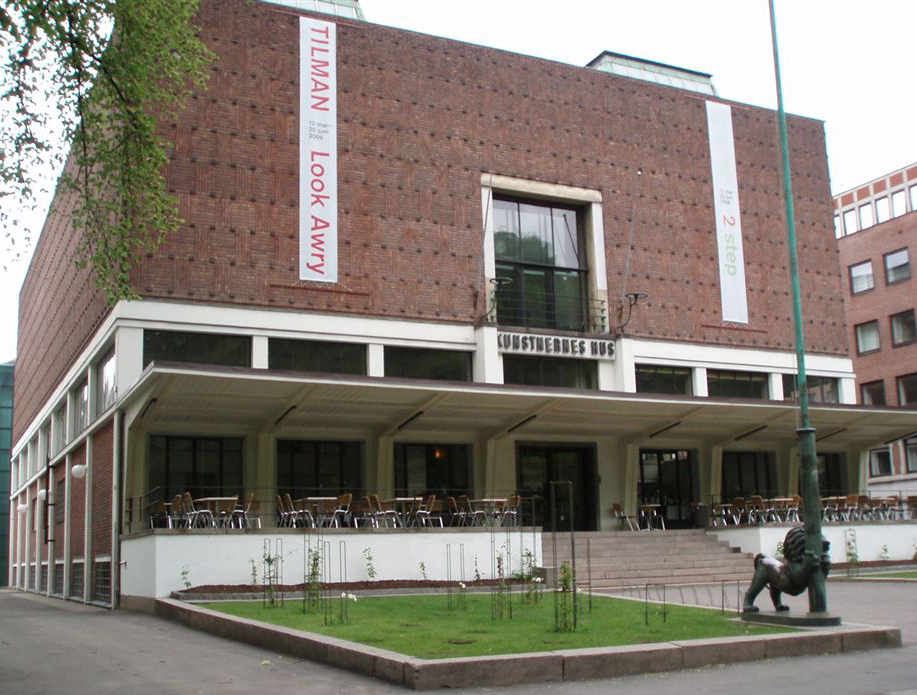
Høstutstillingen has since 1930 been held in Kunstnernes hus (Artists' House) in Oslo.

Høstutstillingen or Statens kunstutstilling (English: The Autumn Exhibition or National Art Exhibition) is an annual art exhibition in Oslo, Norway. The exhibition is Norway's largest marking of contemporary art and takes place each autumn. It is arranged by Norske Billedkunstnere. The exhibition is set up on the basis of free submission. Den nasjonale jury (Eng: The National Jury), which is responsible for the assessment of the submitted work, consists of a technician in each of the techniques: painting, sculpture, graphics, drawing, textile, and other techniques.

The first Høstutstillingen was held as Kunstnernes Utstilling (eng: The Artists Exhibition) in 1882. It was held as a radical protest against the established bourgeois dominance in Christiania Kunstforening (eng: Christiania Art Society) and that it would not let an artist jury decide the purchases for the association's annual exhibition. The protest was led by famous artists such as Frits Thaulow, Christian Krogh and Erik Werenskiold. In 1884 the exhibition received state aid and was renamed Statens Kunstutstilling (eng: The National Art Exhibition). It was intended to show the quality and range of Norwegian art. In 1891, an image of Edvard Munch was bought by Nasjonalgalleriet (eng: The National Gallery) for 200 Norwegian kroner. From 1894, the exhibition was held in the spring twice but quickly found its permanent place in the fall. Since 1930, the exhibition has been shown in Kunstnernes Hus (eng: Artists' House).

Traditionally, the visual art forms of sculpture, drawing, graphics, textiles, and paintings have been represented in the exhibition. There are, however, more and more common among artists to work within the umbrella term "other techniques", that is, photography, film, performance art, sound and so on. The exhibition has therefore been open to a wide range of forms of expression in the recent years. It has not always been so. Kåre Kivijärvi (1938–1991) was the first photographer who was allowed to exhibit his works at Høstutstillingen. This happened in 1971. He thus paved the way for photography as art that was accepted by the exhibition board. Video and mobile phone photos are among the newer forms of expression in the exhibition.

In 2004 there were 1200 registered works for Høstutstillingen. Of these, only 117 were shown at the exhibition. The following year there were over 1700 registered artworks. It is the largest number of registered artworks for the exhibition so far. In 2004, 31 533 persons visited the exhibition, and that was an increase of about 2000 from the previous year.

In 2008, 4289 works were submitted for the first round of jury review. Of these, 110 works by 108 artists were accepted by the selection committee. 55 participants had their debut.
