= Peter Esdaile =

Norwegian painter and sculptor

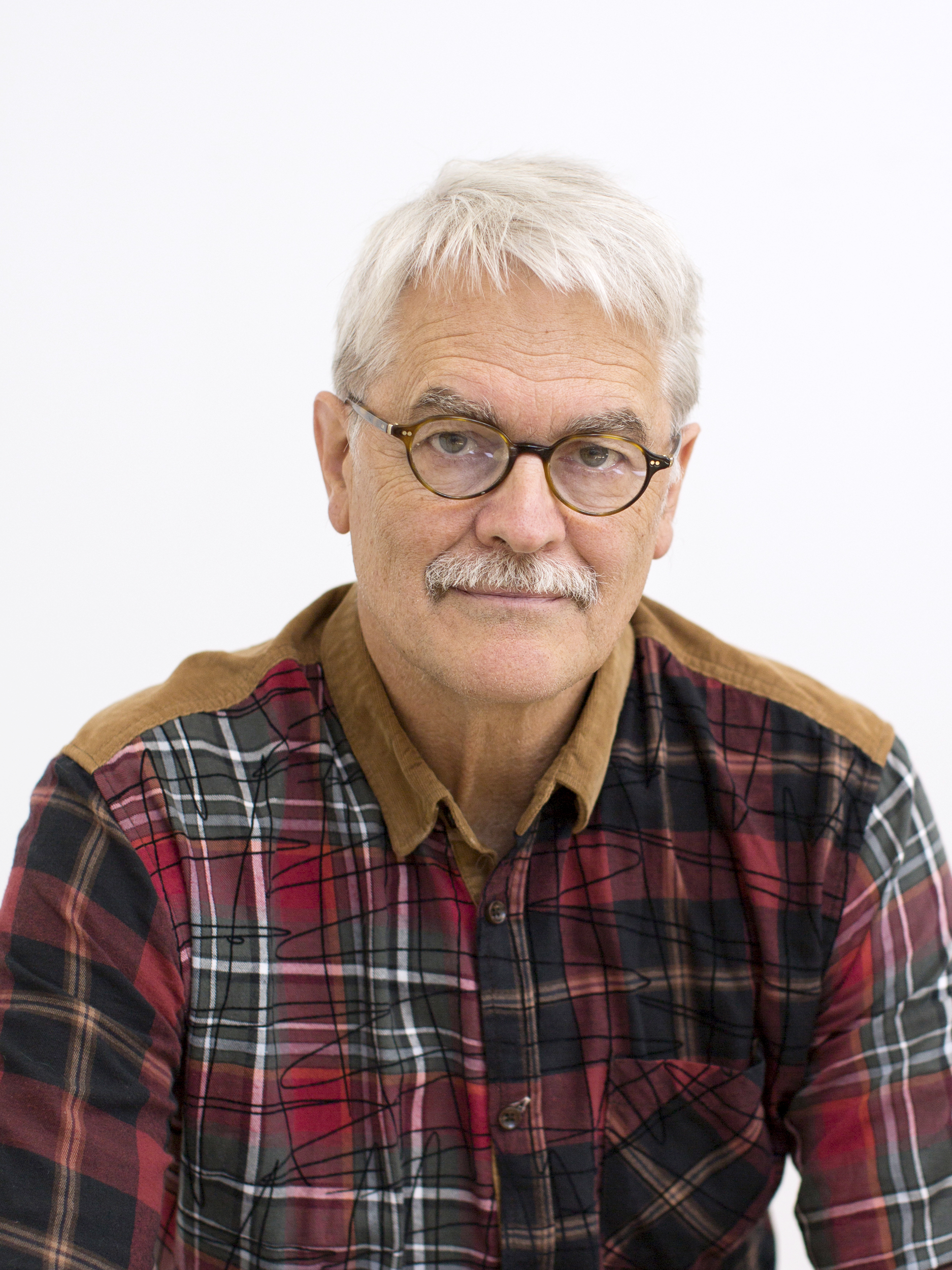
- Born: 20 October 1947 (age 78); Montréal, Canada
- Education: National Academy of Craft and Art Industry
- Website: http://peteresdaile.com

Peter Esdaile (born 20 October 1947) is a Norwegian painter, sculptor, and printmaker born in Canada. Esdaile was educated in the period 1966–1973 at the National Academy of Craft and Art Industry, and at the National Academy of Fine Arts where he received his MFA. He studied under Chrix Dahl, Åge Storstein, Ludvig Eikaas, Halvdan Ljøsne, and Arne Malmedal.

While Esdaile's early works were more political in nature, his later works have evolved to become a fusion of surrealism and expressionism. Esdaile's works are informed by Western and Oriental philosophy and have been influenced by Francis Bacon, David Hockney, Piet Mondrian, Salvador Dalí, Max Ernst, Anselm Kiefer, Alberto Giacometti, Knut Rose and Jens Johanessen.

== Background ==
Born in Montréal in the region of Quebec in Canada on 20 October 1947, Esdaile was the first child of Robert Clarke Esdaile (1918–1987) a Canadian-born architect, and Elin Høst (1920–1983) a Norwegian teacher, recipient of an UNESCO Award for her work with preschool children, and daughter of Herman Fleischer Høst. The couple met in Sweden after the Second World War and married in 1947. They relocated to Montréal where Robert lectured in design at the School of Architecture at McGill University. In 1949 the family moved with two-year-old Peter to Norway. As an architect, working for Bærum Municipality, Robert designed numerous projects building private residences and condominiums in Bærum, and was a major figure in the early modernist movement that reshaped the landscape of Norwegian architecture in the 1950s-1970s. He played an influential role in popularising Le Corbusier's movement of functionalist modern architecture and urban planning. In addition to this, Robert also lectured at the Oslo School of Architecture and Design between 1965 and 1971. He was often featured in editorials concerning urban planning in the Norwegian newspaper Dagbladet. He would later move on to serve as a professor at the Norwegian Institute of Technology in Trondheim, in 1971.

=== Early years ===
Peter was at a young age encouraged by his father to pursue his talents in drawing and painting. As a painter, Robert provided his son with a foundation in drawing and painting and by the age of 12, Peter debuted with his first exhibit at Børsum's Antiques. Esdaile continued his studies with the Norwegian painter Ragnar Kraugerud, but did not exhibit again until the 1970s.

== Career ==
=== Early artistic career ===
At age 19, Esdaile began formal studies at the National Art and Craftsman School in 1966 where he focused on drawing and painting as his primary mediums. Other studies included work in graphics, that he later pursued in his professional career including some experimental works in large-format.

From 1968 to 1973, Esdaile continued his studies at the National Art Academy in Oslo, Norway. Here again the focus was a classically driven academy education of drawing and painting skills, with an emphasis on art history, modernism and abstract art, especially French. By 1971, Esdaile found his own expression as a painter, with his professional debut as an artist at UKS, an important venue for young up-and-coming artists. This exhibit of paintings, graphic art, drawings and sculpture established him as a name in Norwegian art life.

Esdaile's works were described as theatrical in nature, due to his theatrical staging of figures, with a gestural line or brushstroke.

From the early 1970s, Esdaile exhibited regularly, his works evolving to include impulses from pop art, and influences from American and English contemporary art of the 1970s. For a time, his figures became stylized and cartoon-like as he explored dystopian Kafkaesque themes of alienation and the insignificance of individuality. During this time, he exhibited in Bonn, Germany to popular and critical acclaim.

By the mid-1970s, Esdaile's style had shifted to a freer, more realistic style with a touch of Expressionism, especially in his graphic art. This change enabled him to explore a wider scope of human experience, from intimate human relations and erotica, to a reflection of his travels in Kenya and Tanzania.

From the 1970s to the 1980s, Esdaile became known as one of the leading figures in Graphic Art in Norway and was clearly in the forefront of the new Renaissance of young artists in Scandinavia. During this time, he traveled widely and exhibited regularly at a variety of venues throughout Scandinavia.

Notable is his exhibit, "The Dream, the Dance, and Reality," that debuted at the Edvard Munch Museum, in Oslo in 1978. This exhibit consisted of 52 color etchings with aquatint that were also published as a book collection. The book itself was not only a collection of the etchings themselves, but also a collection of poetry written by Esdaile to accompany the artwork. Much of the poetry was inspired by Esdaile's readings of Carlos Castaneda and his spiritual journey into Mexican-Indian shamanism. In addition, there was a dance production connected to the exhibit that was choreographed and performed at Torshov Theatre. This performance in eight acts featured a pictorial presentation on a large screen of a selection of the graphic art, while Esdaile read selections from his text.

This exhibit in particular indicated a movement away from political commentary and into a spiritual, mythical and mystical world that received popular and critical attention.

By the 1980s, Esdaile's exhibits began to move back towards the direction of painting and sculpture in brass and wood. The paintings especially during this time were inspired by the writings of Gabriel Garcia Marquez and were lively, humorous, and erotic with a touch of surrealism. Esdaile's theatricality was given free rein to explore a free-floating dream world during this period with works in watercolor, gouache, acrylic and oil and later drawings in pastel and charcoal.

During the 1980s, Esdaile was in the leading movement of internationalizing painting in Norway, bringing a more modern, energetic and loose flowing expressionism to painting. Clearly some of Esdaile's influences at this time were Anselm Kiefer and Mimmo Paladino.

=== Teaching, experimentation and contemplation ===
Esdaile taught as a professor in graphic art, at the Art Academies in Trondheim, Bergen and Oslo, in the mid-to-late 1980s. During this time, he immersed himself in constructivism, experimented in monumental graphic art and photo gravure, monumental drawings in pastel and charcoal highly influenced by the works of Piet Mondrian and eventually large sculptural works. Throughout these years, Esdaile had an active schedule of exhibiting these experimental works, throughout Norway and Scandinavia.

=== Public and private commissions ===
During the 1990s, Esdaile worked as a sculptor on large-scale commissions both private and public. These works were monumental works in Plexiglas, brass, steel and wood. Esdaile experimented working with these mediums, playing with capturing light, reflecting the elements of water, air and fire, creating an energetic and sensual sculptural style.

During the years 1995–2002, Esdaile's work was featured on a total of approximately eight different cruise ships, amongst them Kloster Cruise Line, Royal Caribbean Cruise Line and Silversea Cruises. In addition to this, he also completed large commissions for a number of public and private buildings in Oslo, Bærum and Bergen.

=== Painting revisited: The Apollonian and Dionysian Expression ===
After 2002, Esdaile pursued painting with a series of new techniques. Initially, the experimentation during this period resulted in uniting the language of geometric forms with more organic free-flowing structures. Over time his paintings evolved yet again, and the depiction of figures and a loose surrealist narrative re-emerged.

As Esdaile expressed in 2002:

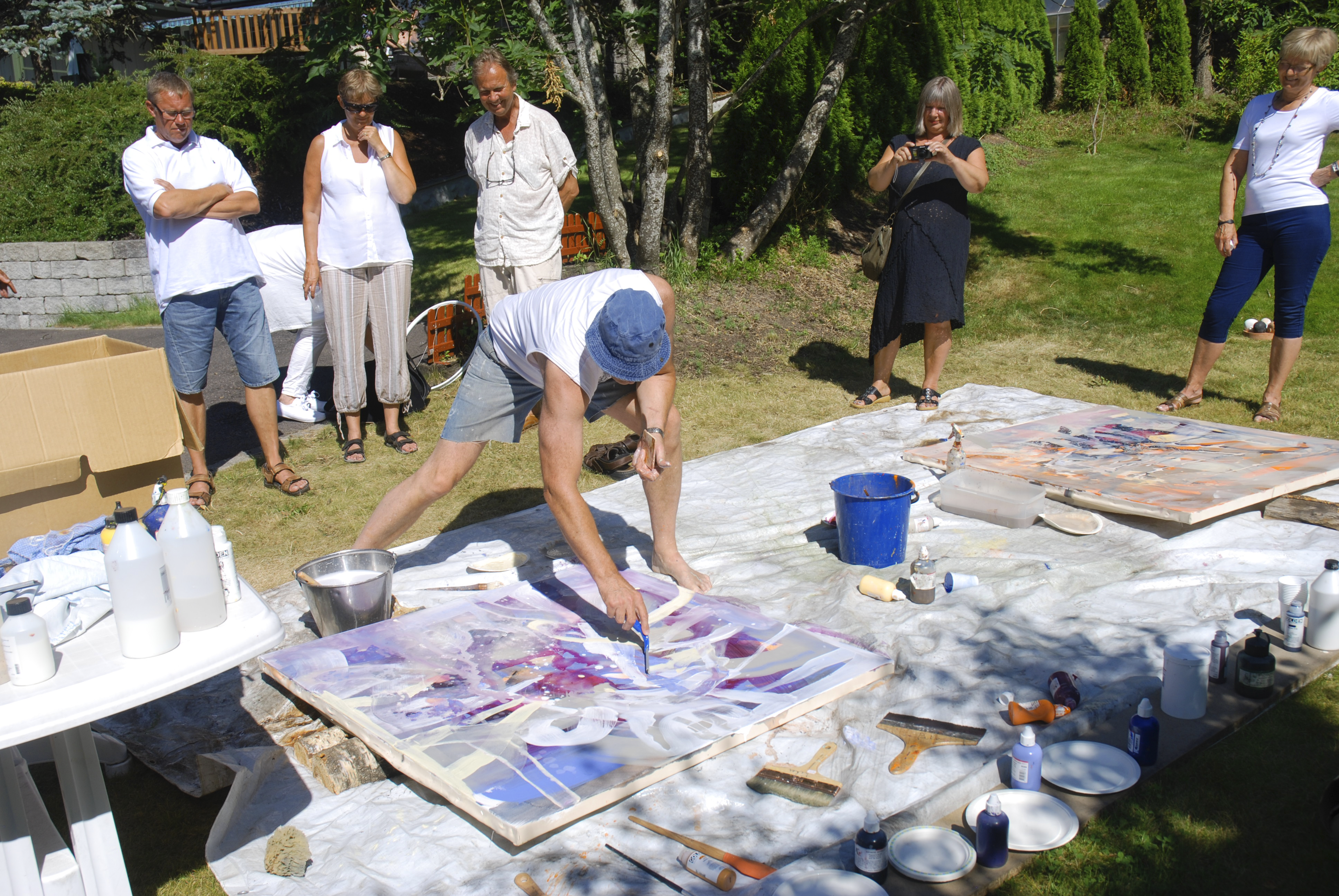
Peter Esdaile doing a performance

Something unexpected has occurred. First a head shows up, then several, followed by hands and bodies, almost as a materialization on the surface of the canvas. It seemed natural to say yes to this inviting behavior and simultaneously attempt to place these homeless bodies in a new experiential context. The human body began to again have substance in my existential quest, perhaps more as a metaphor than an object.…

In 2006, Esdaile moved to the United States, spending six years developing his art. During this period, Esdaile's methods were informed by the American psychoanalyst Rollo May. Esdaile was inspired by May's writings of creativity, of balancing the impulses of the Dionysian tendencies towards chaos, with the Apollonian need for structure and order. Esdaile experimented with the Dionysian impulse of chaos with energetic brushstrokes, tempered by an Apollonian structure of classical composition and narratives.

Esdaile's paintings are characterized by a blend of collective and personal mythologies, dream-like images, satirical and playful depictions of meta-art and pop iconography. His painterly techniques are a layering of minimalist gestural brushstrokes that are then built upon with a free flowing process of classical compositions and glazing techniques that create an interplay of light and shadow, a technique that characterizes the works of Rembrandt.

In 2012, Esdaile returned to Norway where he has focused on painting and sculpture. Esdaile was awarded the Aksel Waldemar's Memorial Prize in 2013. By 2014 the book "Peter Esdaile" was published by Labyrinth Press to coincide with a number of exhibits. Haugar Art Museum exhibited his works "Windows in Time" in 2015. Haugar Art Museum purchased several works.

== Collections ==
Esdaile's work is part of many permanent public collections including the National Gallery, Oslo; Riksgalleriet, Oslo; Bærum Municipality, Bærum, Norway; Oslo Municipality's Art Collection, Oslo; the Arts Council of Norway, Oslo; the Federal Office of Justice, Bonn; Stavanger Art Museum, Stavanger; Eskiltuna Art Museum, Eskiltuna, Sweden; Nordic House, Reykjavik; Brandts Klædefabrik, Odense, Denmark; and Haugar Art Museum, Tønsberg, Norway.

== Family ==
- Herman Fleischer Høst (grandfather) was chief physician at the National Insurance Service between 1936 and 1954, and chief physician at Bærum Hospital between 1924 and 1951. Høst introduced the modern blood transfusion and blood type tests to Norway in 1919, blood sugar tests in type 2 diabetes patients, and insulin treatment in diabetes patients.
- Herman Høst (uncle), chief physician at the Norwegian Radium Hospital from 1974. Herman served as a professor of radiological cancer therapy at the University of Oslo from 1975, and between 1980 and 1985 he served as dean of the Faculty of Medicine. He was also a member of the Norwegian Academy of Science and Letters.
- Gerd Høst (aunt), actress, author, translator and philologist. Gerd was a professor in Germanic languages at the University of Oslo from 1969. She was decorated as a dame 1st class of the Order of St. Olav and was a bearer of the Order of Merit of the Federal Republic of Germany.
- Carl Gustav Fleischer (uncle to Herman Fleischer Høst), Major General in command of the Norwegian 6th Division during the Narvik Campaign in 1940. He was the first Allied land commander to score a major victory against Nazi Germany and was put in charge of the Free Norwegian Forces in exile after the evacuation of Norway. Fleischer was decorated with the Norwegian War Cross with Sword, the Polish War Order of Virtuti Militari, and the French Croix de Guerre. He was also made a Knight Commander of the Order of the Bath.

== Fellowships & Awards ==
- State Fellowship, 1976 – 78 and 1990 – 93
- Oslo City's Grant 1981
- First Prize - National Drawing Competition 1984
- Ingrid Langaard's Grant 1994
- Copyright Fund Grant 2003
- Copyright Fund Grant 2008
- Aksel Waldemar's Memorial Prize 2013

== Literature ==
- Drømmen, dansen, og virkeligheten by Peter Esdaile. Bokklubben Nye Bøker, 1978. ISBN 82-574-0087-4
- Hamsun Fantasier by Ingar Sletten Kolloen and Tommy Olsson. Forlaget Press, 2009. ISBN 978-82-7547-370-5
- Peter Esdaile by Øivind Storm Bjerke. Labyrinth Press, 2014. ISBN 978-82-7393-168-9
