= Siri Aurdal =

Norwegian painter (1937–2026)

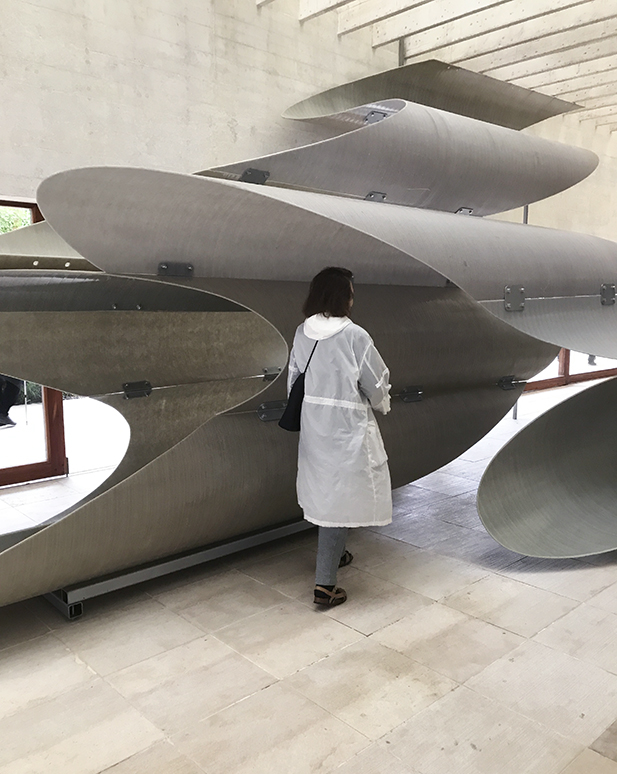
- Born: 20 October 1937; Oslo, Norway
- Died: 31 March 2026 (aged 88); Oslo, Norway
- Known for: sculptures
- Notable work: "Havbølger"
- Parent(s): Synnøve Anker Aurdal and Leon Aurdal

Siri Aurdal (20 October 1937 – 31 March 2026) was a Norwegian painter, graphic designer and sculptor. She came from an artistic family with parents textile artist Synnøve Anker Aurdal and painter Leon Aurdal. Ludvig Eikaas was her stepfather from 1959.

Although Aurdal was both a graphic designer and painter, her main field was sculpture and work with sculpture. She made her debut at the Høstutstillingen 1961 with a bust of Egil Eggen in brass. After that, she made a number of other busts of famous people, including Earle Hyman (1963) and Svend von Düring and Ludvig Eikaas (1965).

In February 1969, she won a competition to decorate schools in Oslo, and in October 1972 presented the sculpture "Havbølger" at Trosterud skole. It was 12 × 6 m glass fibre tubes cut in wavy shapes which serves as a play sculpture for 100 children.

In 1979, she made a large relief in aluminium for Abelhaugen train station in Oslo.

Aurdal died in Oslo on 31 March 2026, at the age of 88.

== Notable exhibitions ==
- 2016 Bølger i parken rekomponert, Vigelandsparken, Oslo
- 1980 Begrensninger dialog, at Vigelandsmuseet, Oslo.
- 1969 Omgivelser, Kunstnernes Hus, Oslo
- 1968 Galleri Kringla, Oslo
- 1966 Kunstforeningen, Oslo

== Collaborative exhibitions ==
- 2016 Aurdal/Mugaas, Kunstnernes Hus, Oslo
- 1974 Tre generasjoner, Kunstindustrimuseet, Oslo

== Collaborative exhibitions ==
- 2017 The Nordic Pavilion at the Venice Biennale : Mirrored
- 2016 Inauguration of new space, Galleri Riis, Oslo
- 2015 Pop Etc.! Norsk popkunst 1964–1974, Henie Onstad Kunstsenter, Bærum, Norway.
- 2013 Hold stenhårdt fast på greia di, Kunsthall Oslo, Oslo
- 1979 The 15th Biennial, Antwerpen, Belgium
- 1973 Arkitektonisk miljø, Galleri F15, Moss
- 1972 Norsk skulptur, Nordjyllands Museum, Aalborg, Denmark
- 1972 Synspunkter, Kunstnernes Hus, Oslo
- 1971 Synpunkter, Arkiv för dekorativ konst, Lund, Sweden
- 1968 The Nordic Youth Biennial, Helsinki, Finland
- 1961–1963 Høstutstillingen, Kunstnernes Hus, Oslo

== Gallery ==
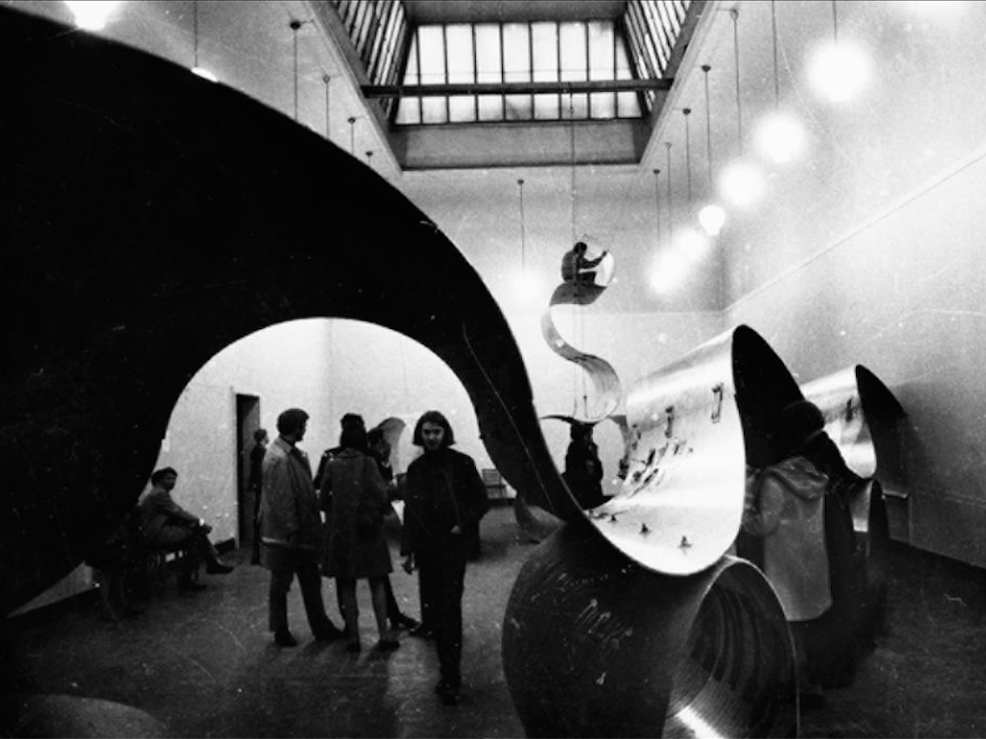
From Siri Aurdal's exhibition OMGIVELSER. Kunstnernes Hus in Oslo, May 1969

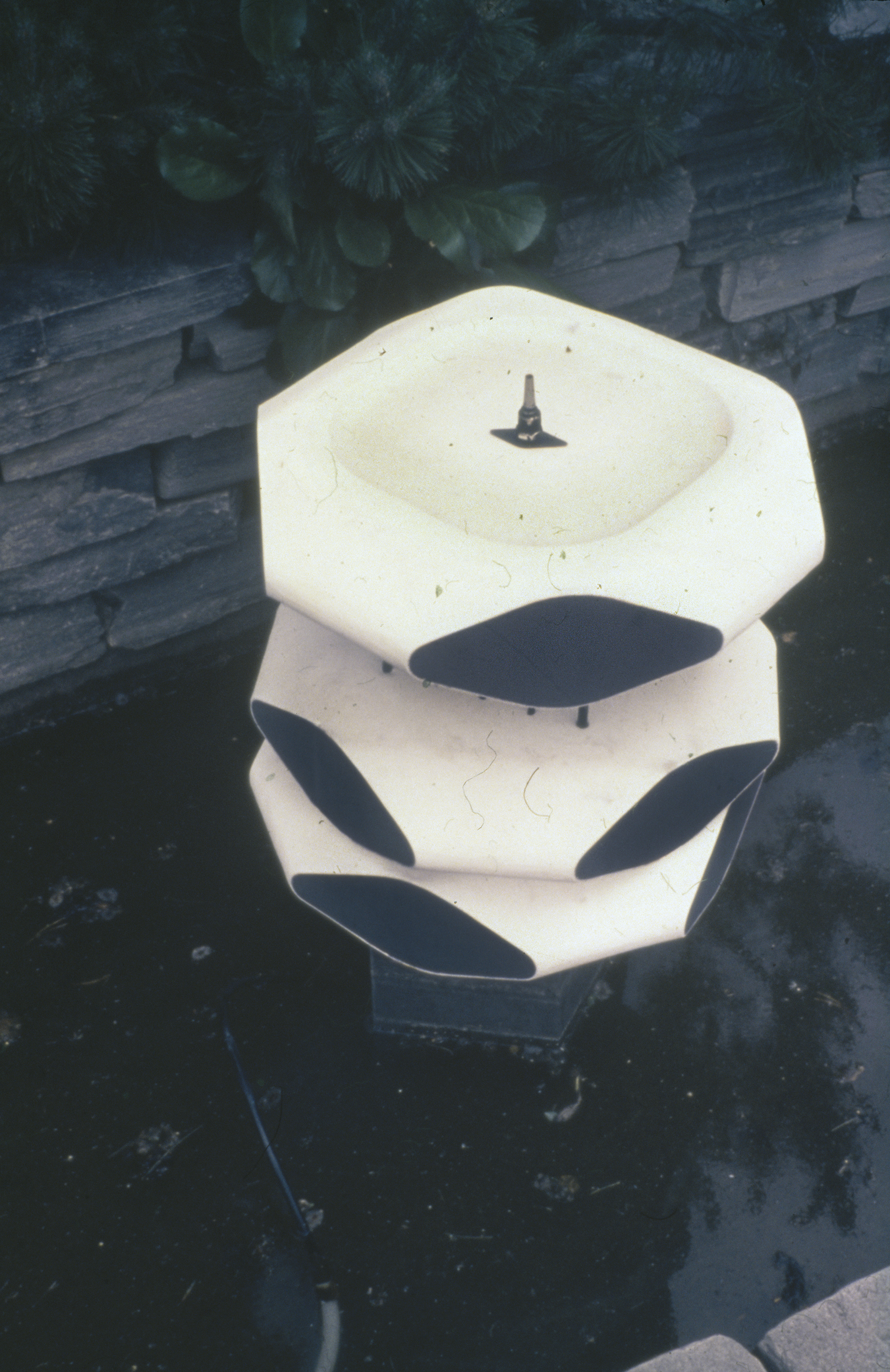
Siri Aurdal FLYTENDE PUNKT. Marmor fontene 1967

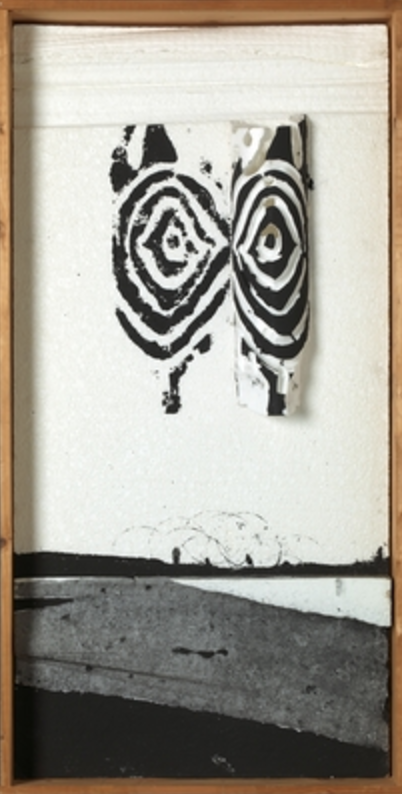
Siri Aurdal. JANUAR 1967. In Nasjonalmuseet's collection

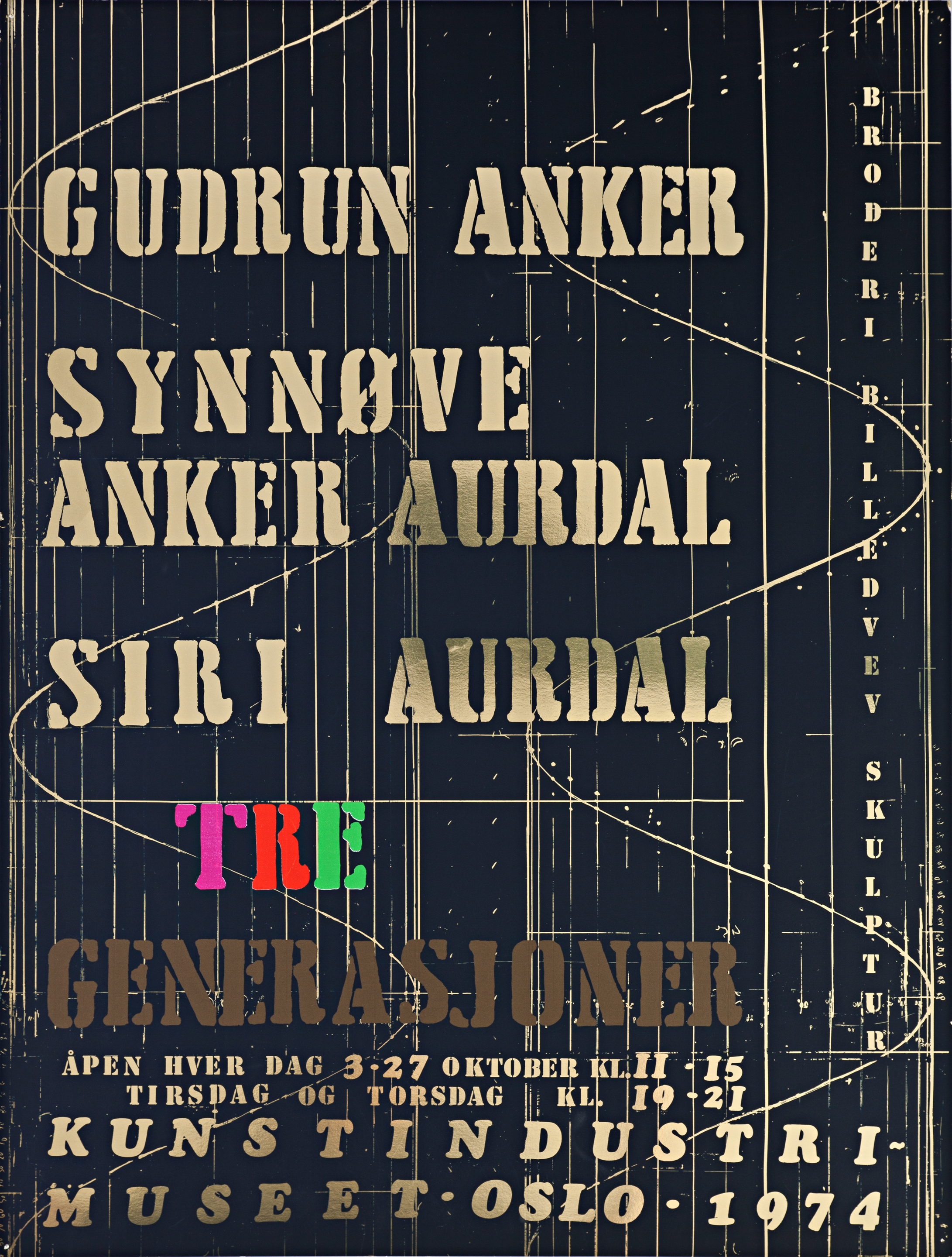
Three generations. An exhibition at Kunstindustrimuseet in Oslo, 1974 with works by Siri Aurdal, Synnøve Anker Aurdal and Gudrun Anker. Poster: Siri Aurdal

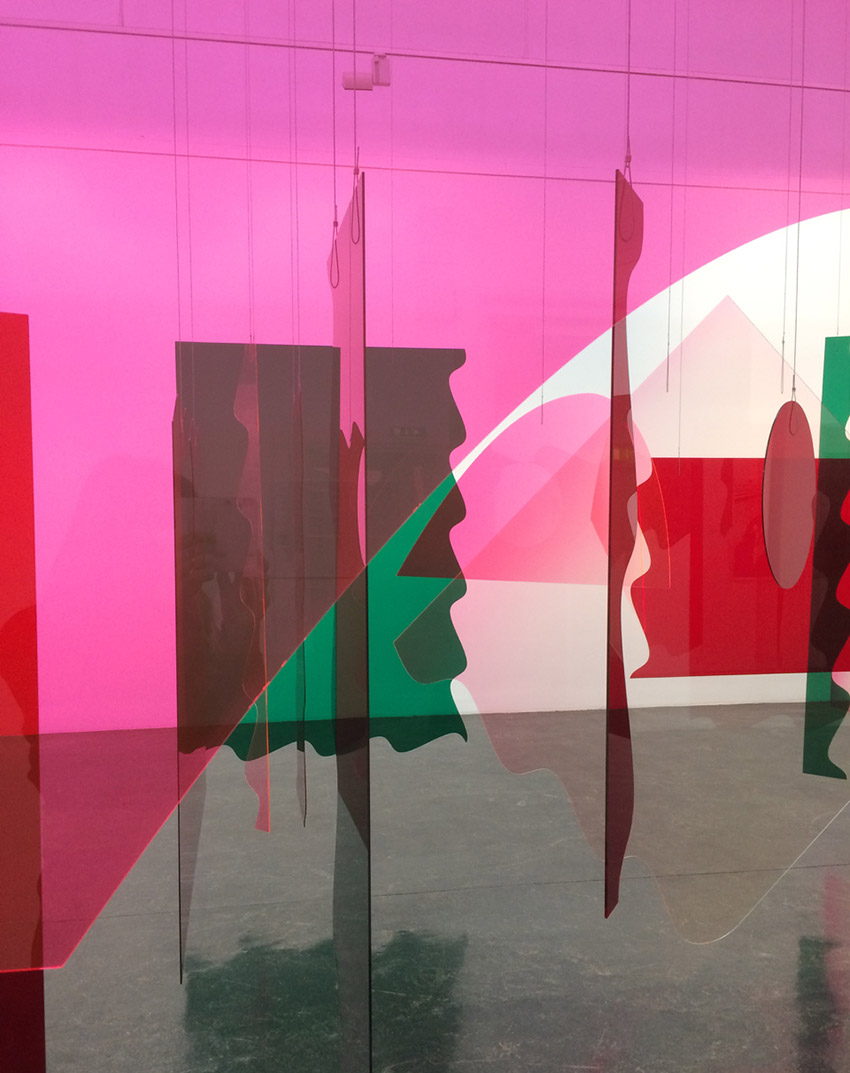
INTERVJU 2016 – Siri Aurdal. From exhibition Aurdal/Mugaas Kunstnernes Hus, Oslo. Tilhører Stavanger Kunstmuseum

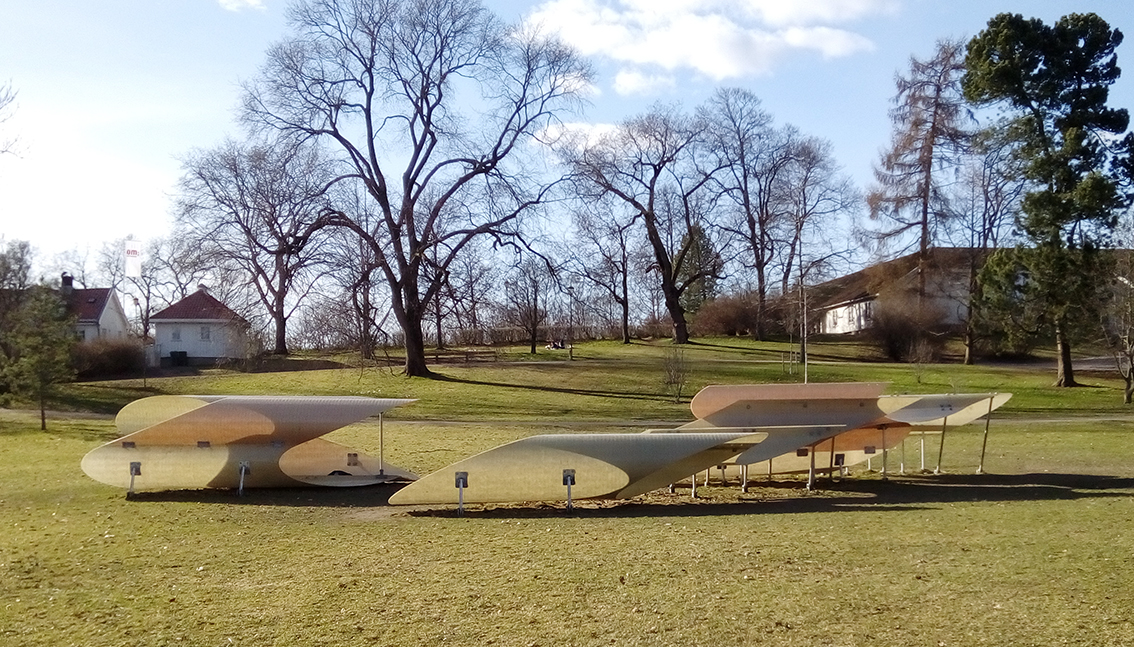
BØLGELENGDER REKOMPONERT 2016 Vigelandsparken

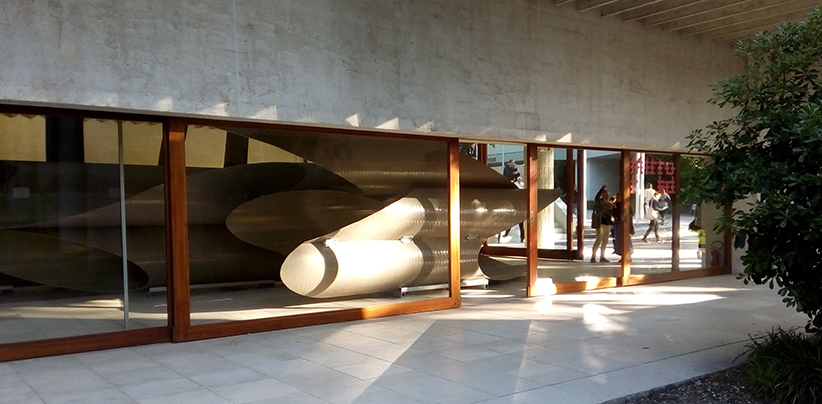
Siri Aurdal ONDA VOLANTE 2017 Venice Biennale. The Nordic Pavilion by architect Sverre Fehn

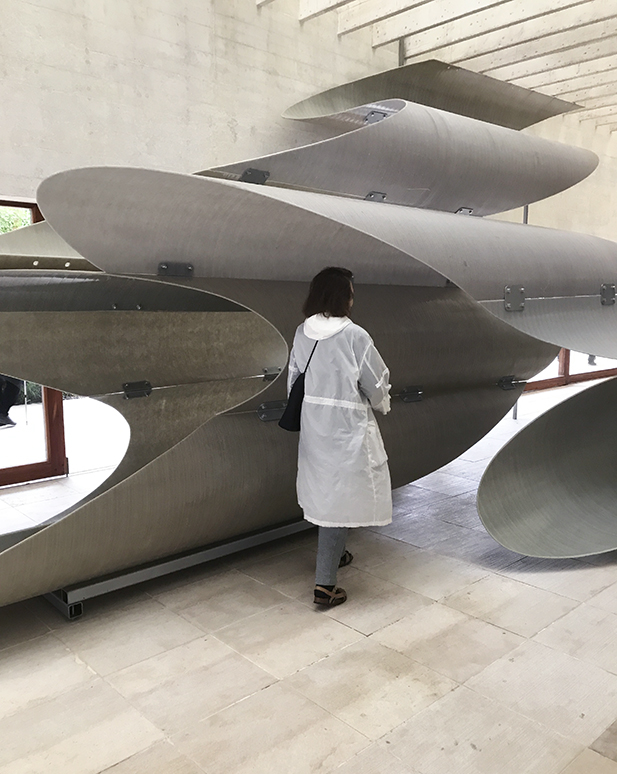
Siri Aurdal into ONDA VOLANTE 2017. Venice Biennale. Nordic Pavilion.
