= Scheel =

Scheel is a surname. As a German surname, it may be derived from nickname schiel/schel/schele 'cross-eyed'. Notable people with the surname include:

- Arnd Scheel, American mathematician
- Ellen Scheel, Norwegian football player
- Frederick A. Scheel, founder of U.S. retailer Scheels
- Fritz Scheel (1852–1907), German-American orchestra conductor
- Georg Scheel, Norwegian barrister
- Günther Scheel (1921–1943), German Luftwaffe fighter pilot
- Gustav Adolf Scheel (1907–1979), German SS physician
- Herman Scheel (1859–1956), Norwegian jurist; chief justice of the Supreme Court
- Heinrich Scheel, German architect
- Ingeborg Scheel, Swiss fencer
- Janet Scheel, American physicist
- John Scheel, coiner of naturopathy
- Jørgen Jacob Scheel (1916–1989), Danish aristocrat, soldier and ichthyologist
- Karl Scheel (1866–1936), German physicist
- Mildred Scheel (1932–1985), German doctor; second wife of Walter
- Walter Scheel (1919–2016), German politician and president
- Baron Boris Vietinghoff-Scheel (1829–1901), Russian composer

== See also ==
- Scheels
