= List of Occidental College people =

Here follows a list of notable people associated with Occidental College in Los Angeles, California. This list includes alumni, attendees, faculty, and presidents of the university.

== Notable graduates and attendees ==
=== Business and industry ===
- John Branca, entertainment industry lawyer
- Norton Clapp, an original owner of Space Needle
- Stephen Cooper, CEO of Warner Music Group
- W. Don Cornwell, CEO of Granite Broadcasting
- Marsha J. Evans, CEO of American Red Cross, Navy admiral
- Frank Hershey, automotive designer
- Arthur Peck, former CEO of Gap Inc.
- Linda Bradford Raschke, commodities and futures trader

=== Entertainment and the arts ===
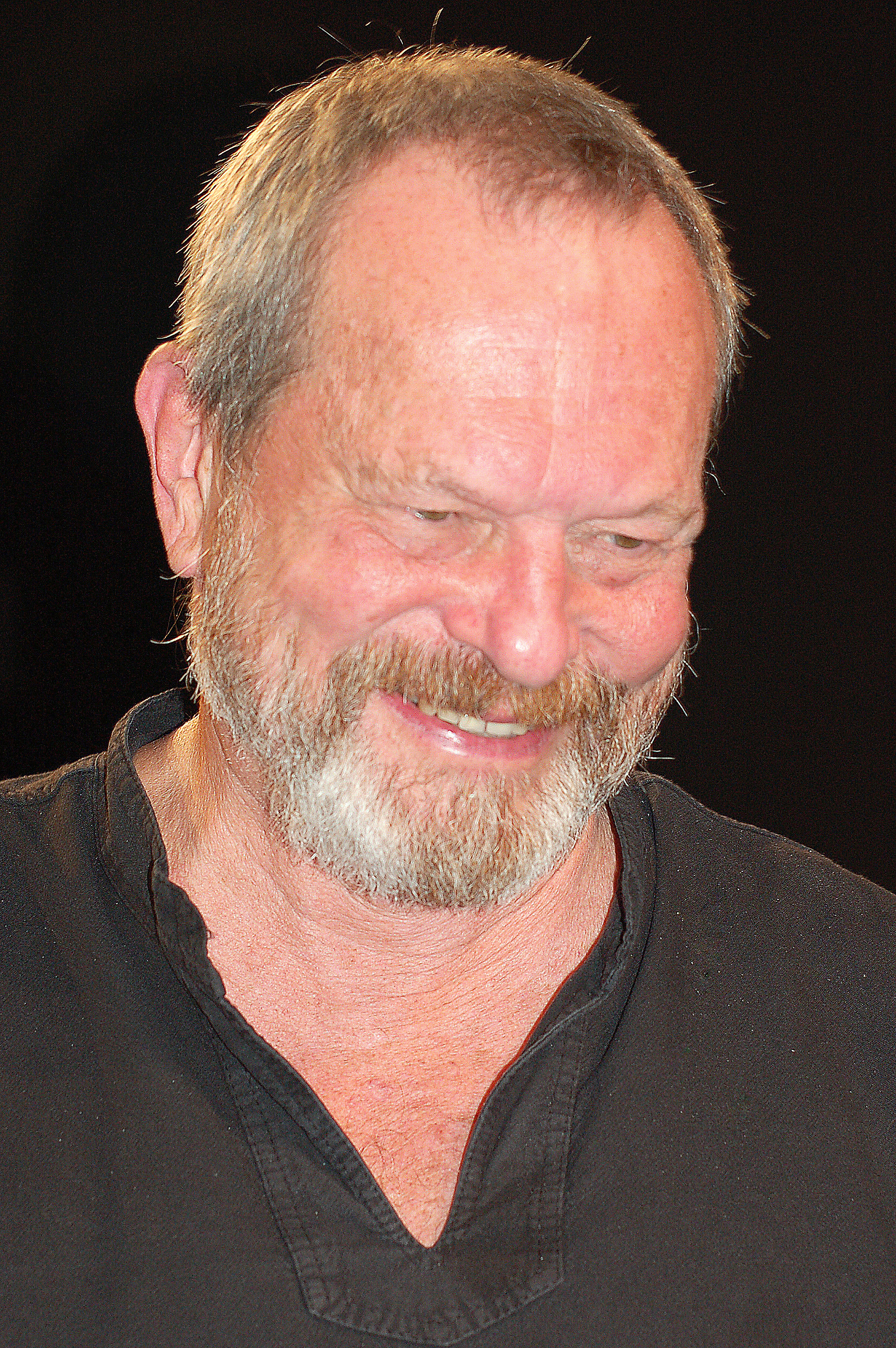
Terry Gilliam

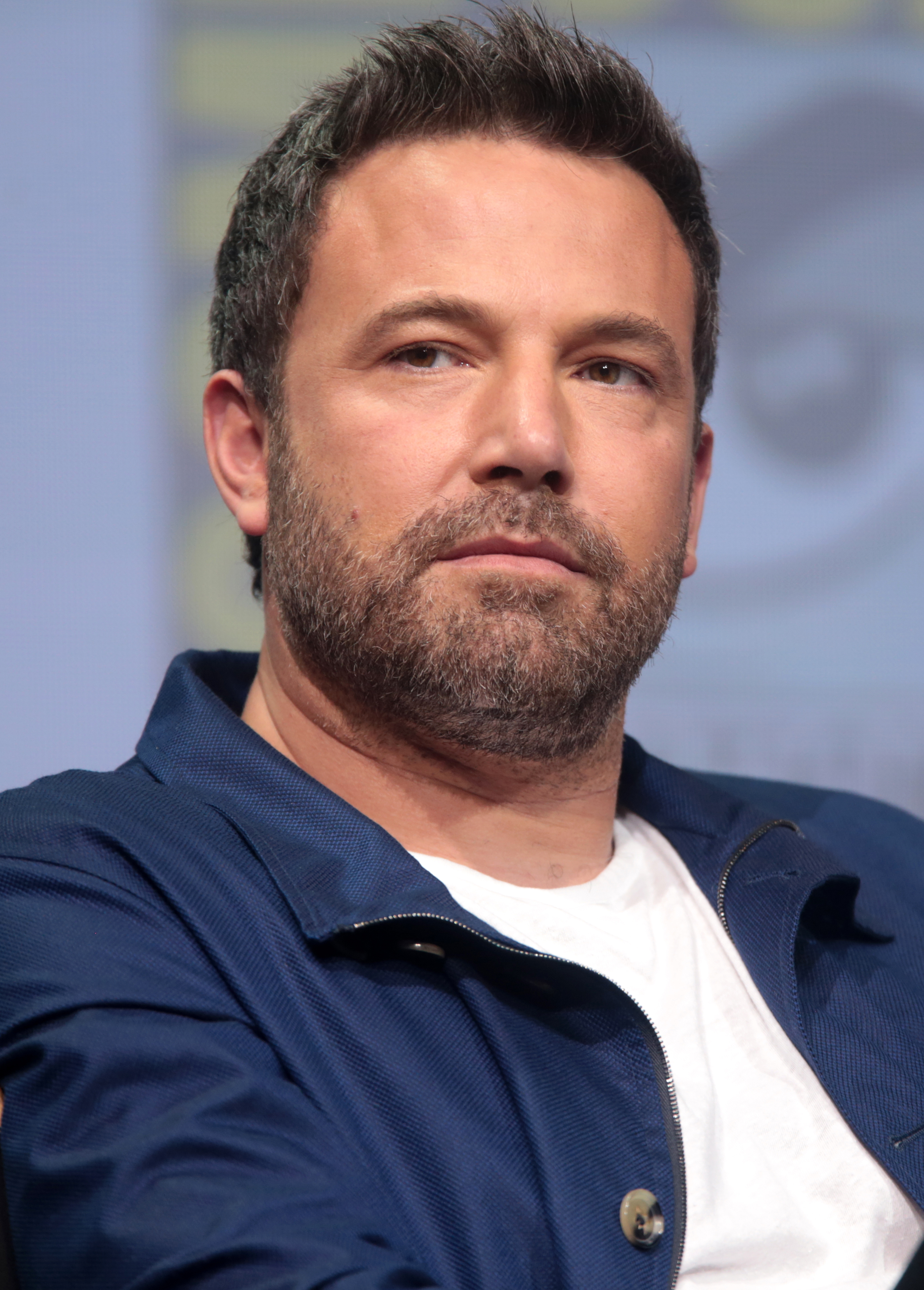
Ben Affleck

- Ben Affleck, actor, director, screenwriter
- Stephen Beal, visual artist
- Ashly Burch, actress
- John Callas, writer, director, producer
- Sadie Calvano, actress
- August Coppola, academic, author, film executive and advocate for the arts
- Glenn Corbett, television actor
- Michael Angelo Covino, actor, filmmaker
- Gabriela Cowperthwaite, documentary filmmaker, Blackfish
- Will Friedle, actor (Falsely credited, not a true alumnus)
- Terry Gilliam, animator and comedian in Monty Python comedy troupe; filmmaker: Brazil, 12 Monkeys
- Joanna Gleason, actor
- Mike Hoover, cameraman, journalist, documentarian, winner of Academy and Emmy Awards
- Terry Kitchen, musician
- Lane 8, musician, producer
- Loren Lester, actor
- Thomas Murray, organist
- George Nader, actor
- Marcel Ophüls, filmmaker
- Emily Osment, actress; Class of 2015
- Cooper Raiff, actor, director
- Joe Rohde, Imagineer
- Peter Scolari, actor
- Jake Shears, lead singer of Scissor Sisters
- Anna Slotky, actress
- Dan Slott, comic book writer
- Kirsten Smith, screenwriter, Ten Things I Hate About You, Legally Blonde, The Ugly Truth
- Roger Guenveur Smith, actor
- Rider Strong, actor
- Taku Takahashi, musician
- Maurissa Tancharoen, actress, singer, dancer, television writer and lyricist
- Jesús Salvador Treviño, television director
- Tui St. George Tucker, composer
- Michael Whaley, actor, director, writer
- Luke Wilson, actor

=== Government, diplomacy, and law ===
- Kathy Augustine, politician from Nevada
- Alphonzo E. Bell, Jr., U.S. congressman
- David S. Cunningham, Jr., Los Angeles City Council member, 1973–87
- Gloria Duffy, president and CEO of The Commonwealth Club, former Deputy Assistant Secretary of Defense, and Special Coordinator for Cooperative Threat Reduction
- Richard Falkenrath, former deputy homeland security advisor
- Robert Finch, Secretary of Health, Education and Welfare 1969–1970, Lieutenant Governor of California 1967–1969
- U. Alexis Johnson, U.S. diplomat

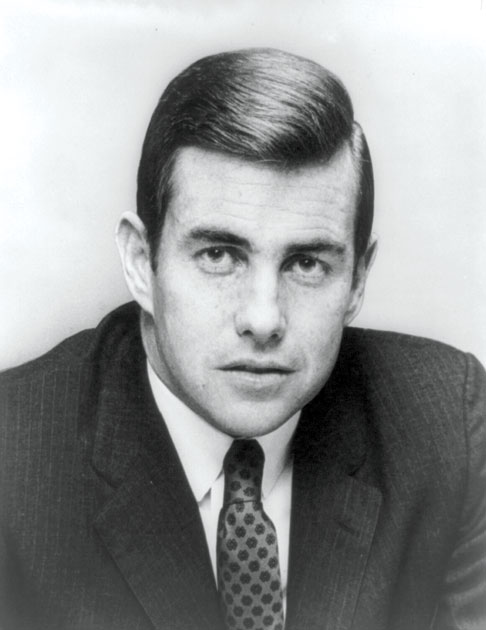
Jack Kemp

- Jack Kemp, AFL and NFL player 1958–1970, U.S. representative from New York 1971–1989, U.S. Secretary Department of Housing and Urban Development 1989–1993, Republican vice presidential nominee in 1996; awarded Presidential Medal of Freedom, 2009
- Kristina A. Kvien, United States ambassador, U.S. Embassy of Armeni
- David M. Louie, attorney general of Hawaii
- Pete McCloskey, U.S. representative 1967–83
- Jacqueline Nguyen, federal judge, United States Court of Appeals for the Ninth Circuit
- Chris Norby, California State Assemblyman

Barack Obama

- Barack Obama, 44th president of the United States
- Dennis R. Patrick, chairman of the Federal Communications Commission, 1987–1989
- Thomas M. Rees, U.S. congressman
- Janette Sadik-Khan, commissioner, New York City Department of Transportation
- Janis Lynn Sammartino, federal judge, United States District Court for the Southern District of California
- Mark S. Scarberry, professor of law at Pepperdine University School of Law
- Grant Woods, Arizona attorney general

=== Higher education and academia ===
- Coit D. Blacker, political science professor at Stanford University
- Glenn S. Dumke, history professor and chancellor of the California State University
- Sharon Gaber, president of the University of Toledo
- Karen L. Gould, president of Brooklyn College
- Lewis Sargentich, legal scholar at Harvard Law School

=== Journalism ===
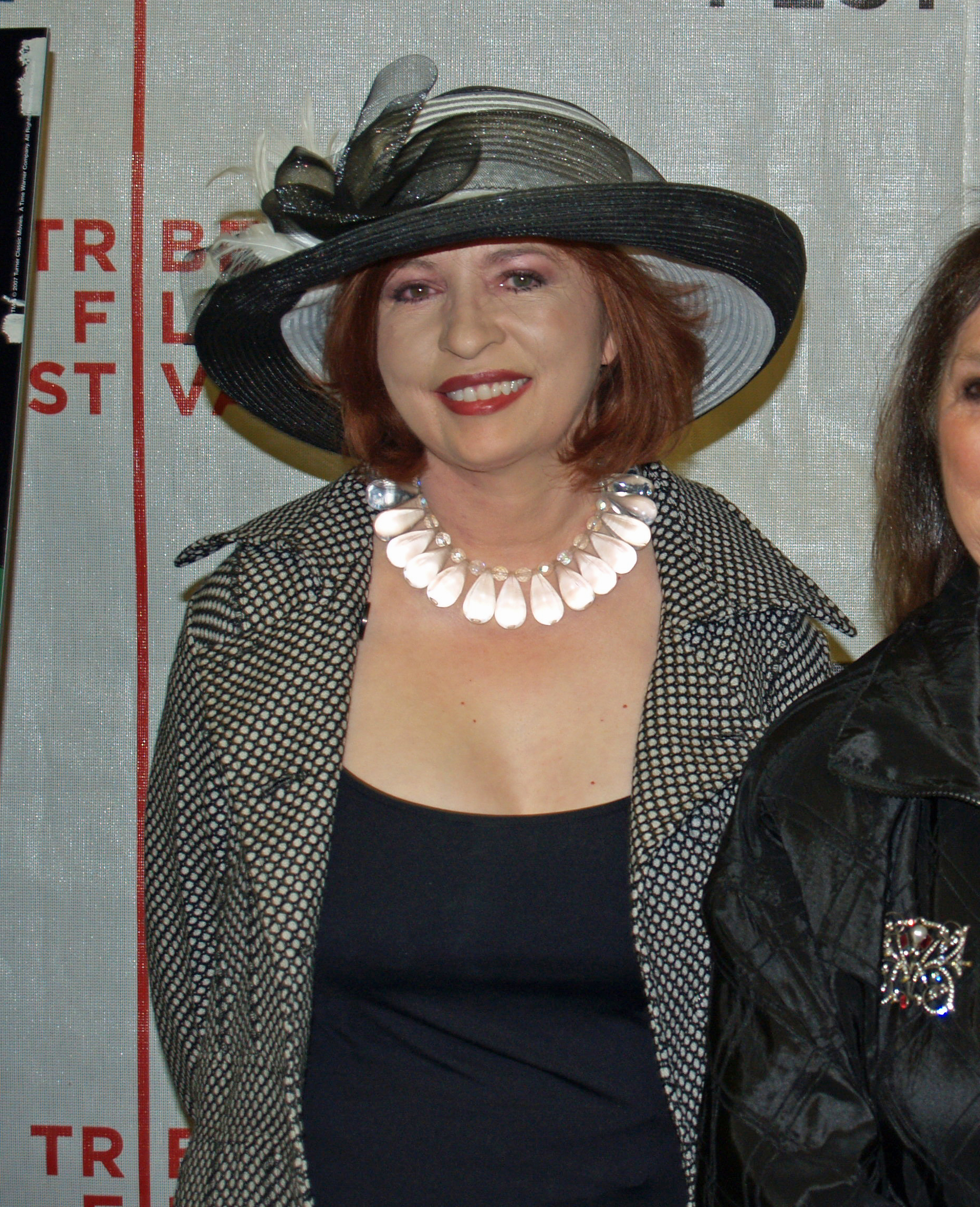
Patt Morrison

- Bessie Beatty (1886–1947), reported on Russian Revolution
- Steve Coll, former Washington Post managing editor, Pulitzer Prize winner
- Andrea Elliott, reporter for The New York Times, Pulitzer Prize winner
- Chris Gulker, photographer
- Margot Mifflin, professor of journalism, feminist cultural critic
- James Andrew Miller, reporter for Washington Post, author of oral histories on ESPN, CAA
- Patt Morrison, NPR radio personality and columnist for the Los Angeles Times
- Sam Rubin, KTLA entertainment anchor, journalist; class of 1982

=== Literature and writing ===
- Mark Dery, author and cultural critic
- M. F. K. Fisher, writer
- Robinson Jeffers, poet
- Scott O'Dell, author, Newbery Award winner
- Carrie Vaughn, writer
- Gladys Waddingham, teacher and local historian
- Rosalind Wiseman, writer

=== Medicine ===
- David G. Armstrong, physician/medical researcher
- Howard Judd, medical researcher

=== Science ===
- Brent Dalrymple, geologist and National Medal of Science winner
- William Goddard, engineer
- Edmund C. Jaeger, naturalist, author, teacher
- J. P. Mallory, archaeologist
- John E. McCosker, ichthyologist
- Fred Lawrence Whipple, astronomer

=== Social action, philanthropy, and community service ===
- Howard Ahmanson, Jr, philanthropist, financier, and writer
- Angelica Salas, immigration activist
- Cameron Townsend, founder, Wycliffe Bible Translators and Summer Institute of Linguistics
- Rex Weyler, author, journalist, ecologist and co-founder of Greenpeace International; did not graduate

=== Sports and athletics ===
- Keith Beebe, football player
- Ron Botchan, five-time Super Bowl official for NFL 1980–2002
- Olin Browne, PGA Tour winner
- Dean Cromwell, USC and Olympic track and field coach
- Luke Collis, arena football player
- Anna Dalton, long-distance runner
- Joe Faust, Olympic high jumper
- Justin Goltz, NFL/CFL quarterback
- Bob Gutowski, pole vaulter, 1956 Olympic silver medalist
- Jack Kemp, AFL and NFL star quarterback of Buffalo Bills
- Sammy Lee, two-time Olympic gold medalist in diving
- Jim Mora, Sr., coached NFL's New Orleans Saints and Indianapolis Colts
- Vance Mueller, NFL running back
- Bill Redell, college and pro quarterback, high school coach
- Johnny Sanders, NFL general manager
- Danny Southwick, arena football player
- Jim Tunney, NFL official 1960–1991; three Super Bowls

== Notable faculty ==
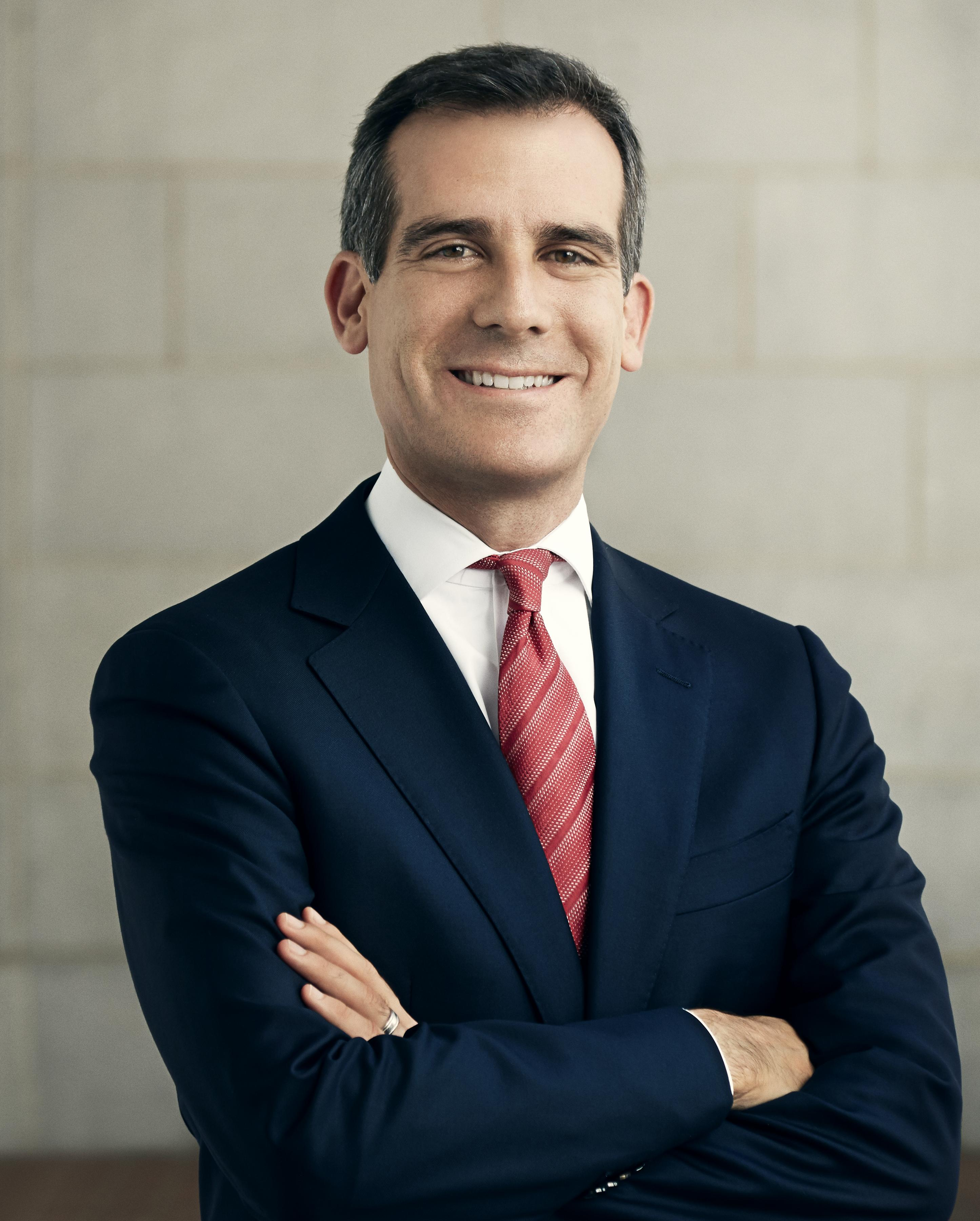
Eric Garcetti

- Linda Besemer (born 1957), James Irvine Distinguished Professor of the Arts 1987–2009
- Peter Dreier, Dr. E.P. Clapp Distinguished Professor of Politics and director of the Urban and Environmental Policy Department; director of Housing at the Boston Redevelopment Authority and senior policy advisor to Boston Mayor Ray Flynn for nine years
- Eric Garcetti, former assistant professor of Diplomacy and World Affairs; former mayor of Los Angeles
- George R. Goldner, art historian, Drue Heinz Chairman of the Department of Drawings and Paints of the Metropolitan Museum of Art
- Julia Holter, singer-songwriter, record producer, composer, artist; appointed Professor of the Practice of Songwriting in 2021
- Sara Rittenhouse Brown (1854–1938), professor, English
- Martha Ronk, Price Professor of English Literature, 2005 PEN American Center Literary Award winner in poetry
- Janet Scheel, Ezra Frederick Scattergood Professor of Physics and chair of the Department of Physics
- Derek Shearer, director of the McKinnon Center for Global Affairs and Chevalier Professor of Diplomacy and World Affairs, former United States Ambassador to Finland

== Presidents ==
The following persons have led Occidental College since 1887:

No.	Image	Name	Term start	Term end	Refs.
1		Samuel H. Weller	1887	1891	
2		J. Melville McPherron	1892	1894	
3		Elbert Nevius Condit	October 1894	July 20, 1896	
4		James W. Parkhill	July 20, 1896	1897	
5		Guy W. Wadsworth	July 28, 1897	September 1905	
acting		William Stewart Young	September 6, 1905	October 1906	
6		John Willis Baer	October 1906	October 12, 1916	
acting		Thomas Gregory Burt	October 12, 1916	August 1917	
7		Silas Evans	August 1917	July 28, 1920	
acting		Thomas Gregory Burt	July 29, 1920	1921	
8		Remsen Bird	1921	June 30, 1946	
acting		Robert G. Cleland (Note: Acting president while Bird was in Europe)	September 1927	January 1928	
acting		Arthur G. Coons	June 1, 1945	June 30, 1946	
9		Arthur G. Coons	July 1, 1946	June 30, 1965	
10		Richard C. Gilman	July 1, 1965	July 31, 1988	
11		John Brooks Slaughter	August 1, 1988	June 30, 1999	
12		Theodore R. Mitchell	July 1, 1999	August 31, 2005	
acting		Kenyon S. Chan	September 1, 2005	August 31, 2006	
13		Susan Westerberg Prager	September 1, 2006	December 31, 2007	
14		Robert Skotheim	January 1, 2008	June 30, 2009	
15		Jonathan Veitch	July 1, 2009	June 30, 2020	
16		Harry J. Elam Jr.	July 1, 2020	June 30, 2024	
17		Tom Stritikus	July 1, 2024	present	

Table notes:
