= Lødøen =

Lødøen is a Norwegian surname. Notable people with the surname include:

- Bjørg Lødøen (1931–2009), Norwegian painter, graphic artist, and composer
- Henrik Lødøen (born 1991), Norwegian jazz drummer
- Kristin Lødøen (born 1966), Norwegian photographer, visual artist, dancer, and choreographer
