= Sigrun Berg =

Norwegian weaver and textile designer

Sigrun Karoline Matina Berg
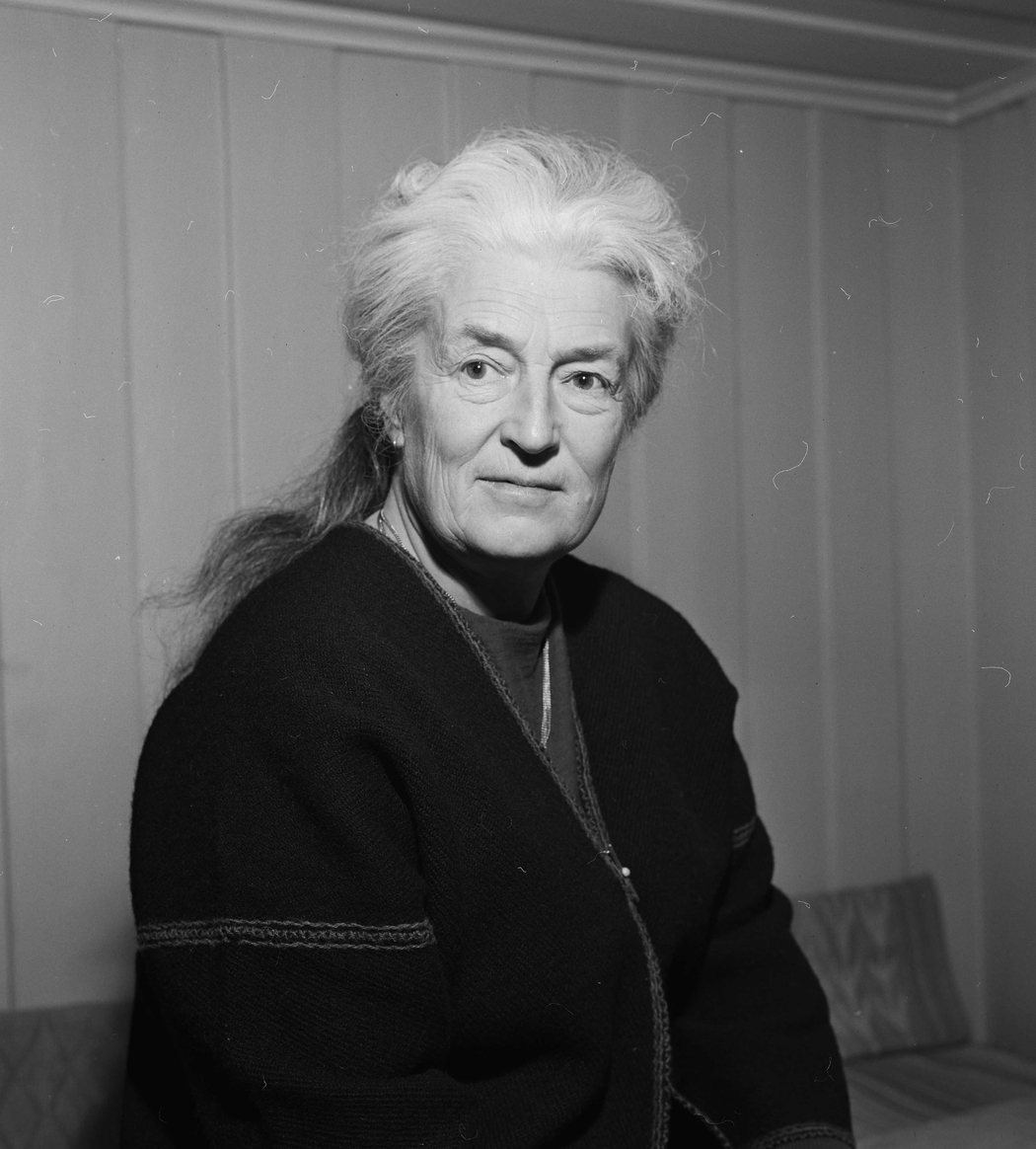
- Born: 18 May 1901; Kristiania, Norway
- Died: 18 May 1982 (aged 81)
- Occupations: Weaver; Textile designer
- Children: Per Erland Berg Wendelbo
- Parent: Paal Berg
- Awards: Jacob Prize (1963)

Sigrun Karoline Matina Berg (18 May 1901 – 18 May 1982) was a Norwegian weaver and textile designer.

== Biography ==
Berg was born in Kristiania (now Oslo), Norway. She was a daughter of judge Paal Berg and Caroline Debes, and was the mother of botanist Per Wendelbo. She was educated from the Norwegian National Academy of Craft and Art Industry (Statens kunstakademi) from 1918 to 1919. She continued her studies at Oslo National Academy of the Arts (Statens Kunstakademi) under Axel Revold from 1934 to 1935. She debuted at the Autumn Exhibition (Høstutstillingen) at Oslo in 1936.

She worked as designer for the brand De Forenede Ullvarefabrikker (The United Wool Ware Factories) from 1957 to 1965. Together with the textile artist Synnøve Anker Aurdal and the painter Ludvig Eikaas, she won the competition for textile decoration of Håkonshallen at Bergen in 1958. Among her other works are decorations for Bodø Cathedral, the city halls of Asker and Sandefjord, and the Royal Yacht HNoMY Norge.
