= Scheels (disambiguation) =

Scheels is an American sporting goods and entertainment chain store.

Scheels may also refer to:

- Chris Scheels (born 1977), American speed skater
- Scheels Arena – Multi-purpose venue in Fargo, North Dakota
- Scheels Center – Arena in Fargo, North Dakota

== See also ==
- Scheel
- Schels
