= Allium farctum =

Scientific classification
- Kingdom: Plantae
- Clade: Tracheophytes
- Clade: Angiosperms
- Clade: Monocots
- Order: Asparagales
- Family: Amaryllidaceae
- Subfamily: Allioideae
- Genus: Allium
- Subgenus: A. subg. Cepa
- Species: A. farctum

Binomial name
- Allium farctum Wendelbo

Species of plant

Allium farctum is an Asian species of onions found high in the mountains of Pakistan and Afghanistan. It is a bulb-forming perennial up to 70 cm tall, producing a bulb up to 25 mm across. Flowers are white, borne in a tightly packed hemispheric umbel.
