= Audunborg =

Castle in Norway

- Sunnfjord, Norway
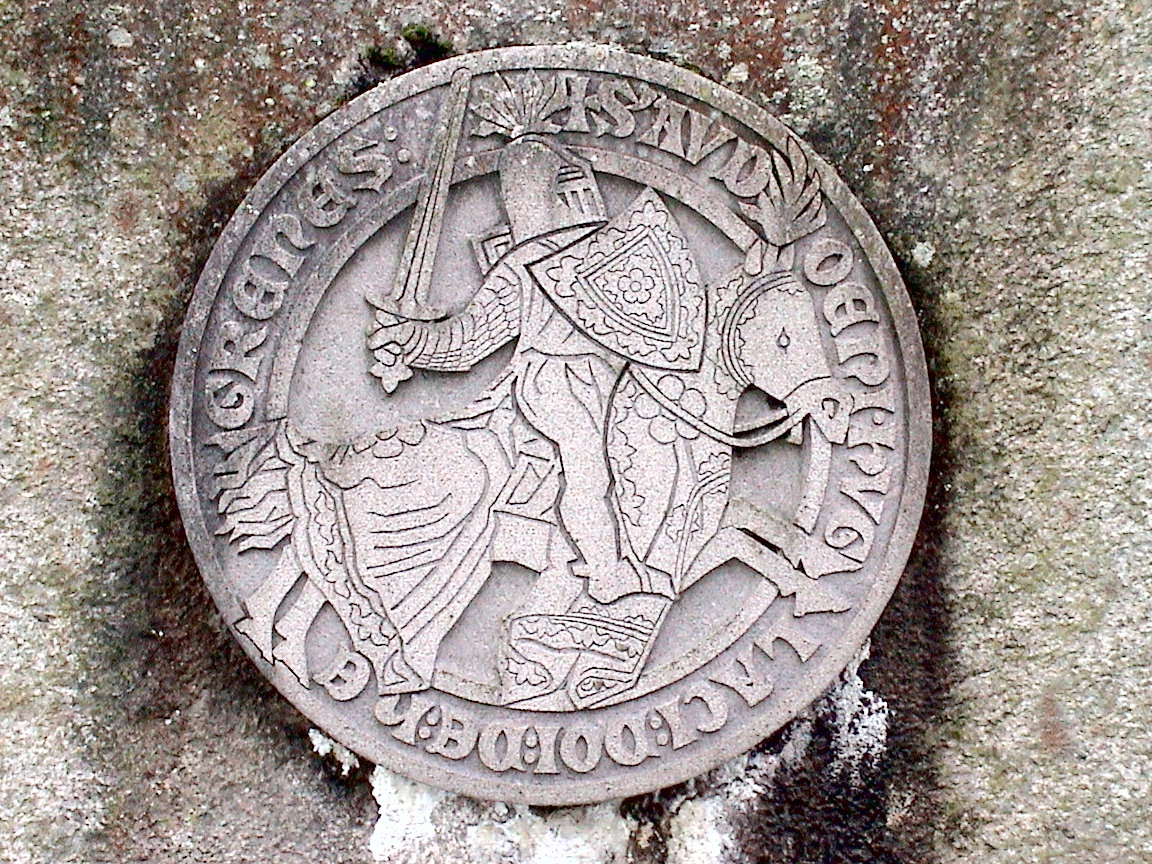
- Audun Hugleiksson's seal on the memorial erected on the former castle site.

Site information
- Type: Medieval castle
- Controlled by: Norway

Location
- Coordinates: 61.53028°N 6.23194°E

Site history
- Built: 1276-1286
- In use: Ca.1276-?
- Materials: Stone

Garrison information
- Past commanders: Audun Hugleiksson
- Garrison: Baron Audun's hird

Audunborg (lit. 'Audun's castle') was a castle and fortification built by Norwegian nobleman Audun Hugleiksson on his inherited estate near the village of Ålhus on the shores of the Jølstravatnet in what is now Sunnfjord Municipality in Vestland county, Norway. The site was located about 8 kilometres (5.0 mi) north-east of the village of Vassenden.

== History ==
The castle was built in stone sometime between 1276 and 1286, probably by English craftsmen working out of Bergen. The rectangular building was 22 by 13 metres (72 ft × 43 ft) and is thought to have had three stories, a store room in the ground floor, living quarters on the next floor, and a feast hall in the top floor. It had large windows and arches. The building itself had water on three sides and was thus easy to defend. It is also thought that a moat or castle wall was part of the fortifications. Recent research claims that Audun himself spent little time in his castle as his activities kept him either in Bergen, in the east of the country or abroad. As a baron, Audun Hugleiksson was allowed to keep a hird (armed retinue) a right otherwise reserved for the king. This hird would defend him on his travels and when he was at home in Audunborg.

In Medieval Norway, typically only the King and the Church had the funds to build in stone and Audunborg along with Isegran by Glomma, built by Alv Erlingsson, are the only two known examples of private stone castles in Norway. Stories about Audun remain in local folklore and one story includes him burying all his money and sinking a silver table into the Jølstravatn before departing for his last trip to Bergen.

== Castle ruins ==
Today, only the ruins remain of the castle that stood at the tip of Hegreneset by the lake Jølstravatnet in Sunnfjord Municipality. It was first excavated by Gerhard Fischer in 1934 and is probably modelled after Håkonshallen in Bergen which was twice as long and twice as wide. A memorial at Audunborg, carved by Jørgen P. Solheimsnes from Jølster Municipality, was erected on the site of the former castle in 1960. Its motif is the baron's seal.

There was a play performed called Audun Hugleiksson – Kongens mann which commemorates the life of Audun Hugleiksson. The play was written by Edvard Hoem and based on the book Kongens sendebod : Audun Hugleikson 1240-1302 which was written by Anne Cecilie Kapstad and illustrated by Ludvig Eikaas.

== Media gallery ==
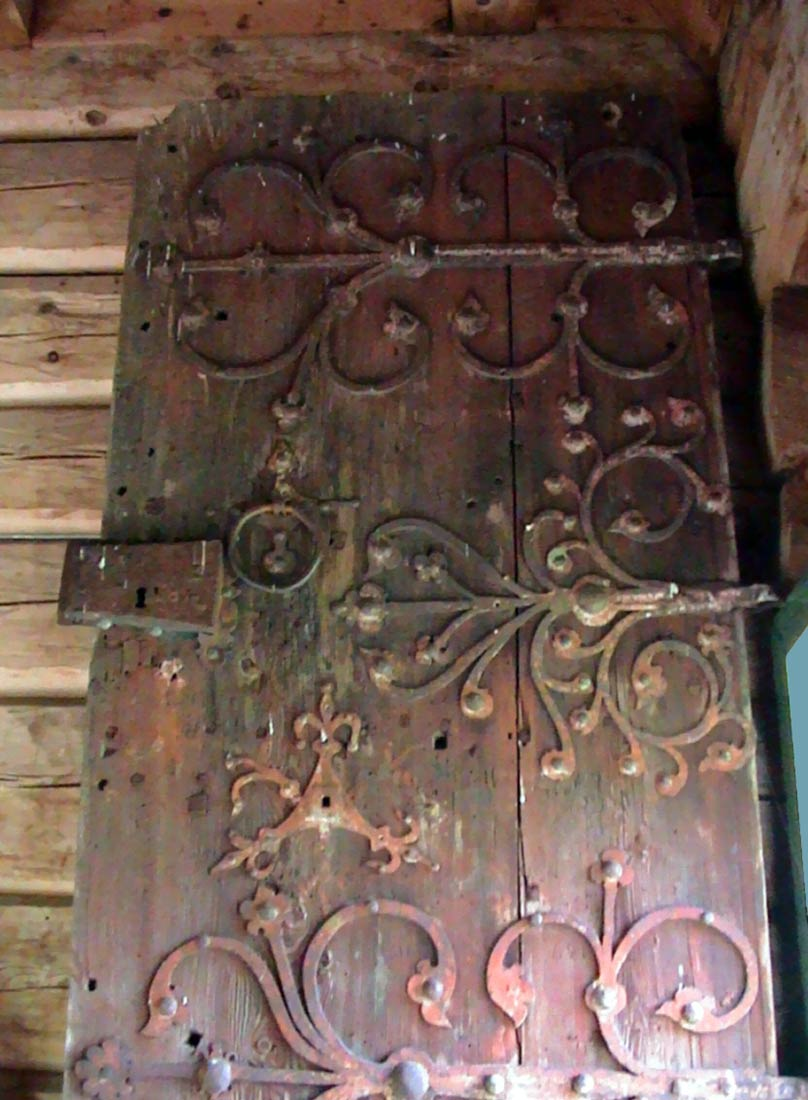
The door on display in Ålhus church is supposedly from Audunborg.

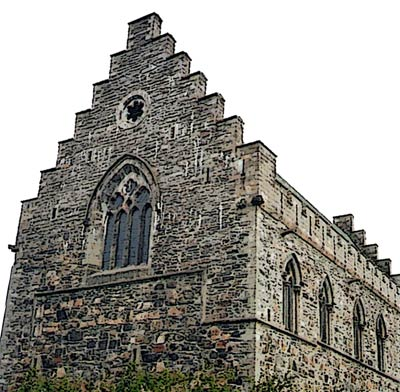
This image based on Håkonshallen gives an idea of how the main building of the castle is thought to have looked

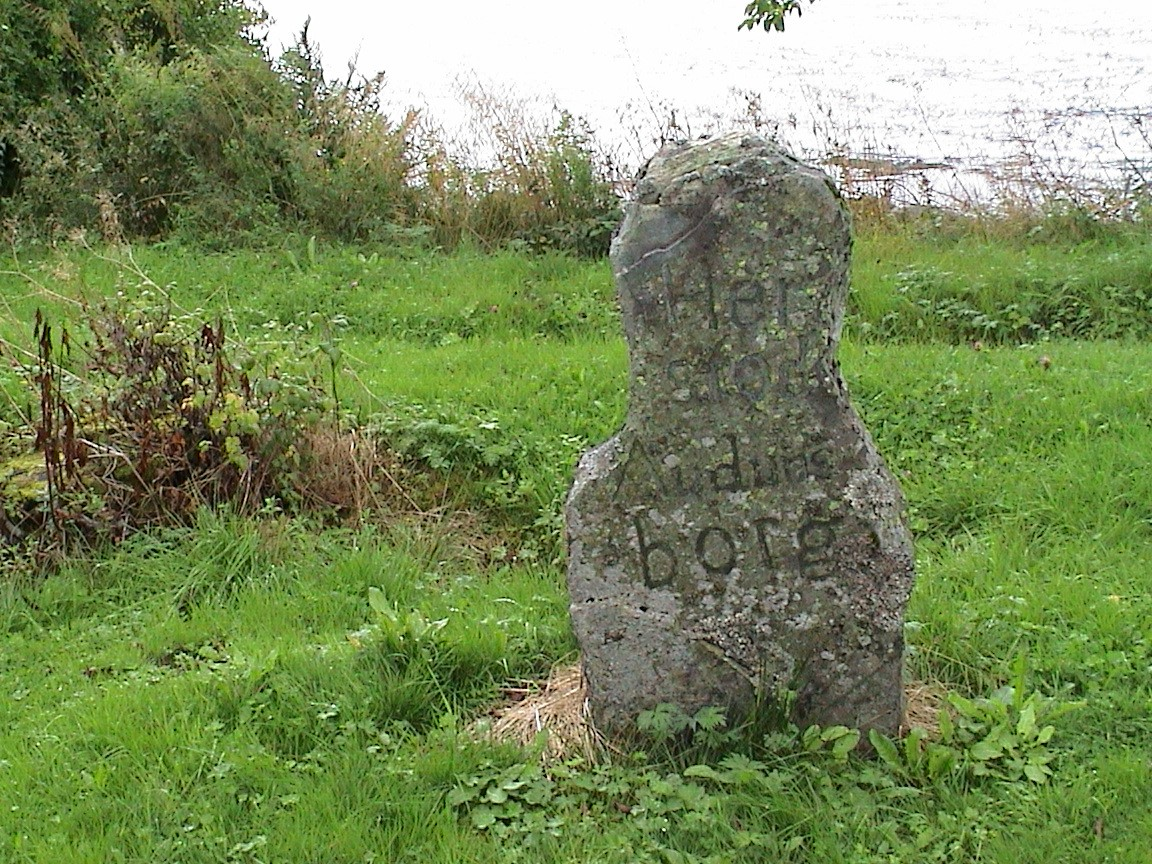
Memorial stone at the former site of Audunborg

== Other sources ==
- Kapstad, Anne Cecilie; Ludvig Eikaas (2000) Kongens sendebod : Audun Hugleikson 1240 - 1302 (Vassenden : Haugland forl.) ISBN 9788299569811
