= Peter Dreier =

American urban policy analyst

- Born: July 12, 1948 (age 78); United States

Academic background
- Education: Syracuse University; University of Chicago

Academic work
- Discipline: Political science
- Institutions: Occidental College
- Website: peterdreier.com

Peter Dreier is an American urban policy analyst, author, self-described democratic socialist, and college political science professor. He is the Dr. E.P. Clapp Distinguished Professor of Politics at Occidental College in Los Angeles, California.

Dreier labels himself a "committed Jew."

== Education ==
Dreier graduated from Syracuse University with a B.A. in 1970 and from the University of Chicago with a Ph.D. in 1977.

== Career ==
Dreier was the Director of Housing at the Boston Redevelopment Authority and senior policy advisor to Boston Mayor Ray Flynn for nine years.

In January 1993, Dreier became a professor at Occidental College.

In 1993, Dreier was appointed by the Clinton administration to the advisory board of Resolution Trust Corporation.

Dreier is an urban policy analyst.

He was a member of the Democratic Socialists of America until 2023, when he left due to DSA's statements regarding the October 7 attacks.

== Selected works ==
- The 100 Greatest Americans of the 20th Century: A Social Justice Hall of Fame.
- Jennifer R. Wolch; Manuel Pastor; Peter Dreier, eds. (2004). Up Against the Sprawl: Public Policy and the Making of Southern California. University of Minnesota Press. ISBN 9780816642984.
- Peter Dreier, John H. Mollenkopf, Todd Swanstrom, Place Matters: Metropolitics for the Twenty-First Century, University Press of Kansas, 2004, ISBN 9780700613649
- Peter Dreier and Robert Elias, Baseball Rebels: The Players, People, and Social Movements That Shook Up the Game and Changed America, University of Nebraska Press, 2022. ISBN 9781496217776

== See also ==
- List of Occidental College people
- Costa–Hawkins Rental Housing Act
