= Synnøve Anker Aurdal =

Norwegian artist (1908–2000)

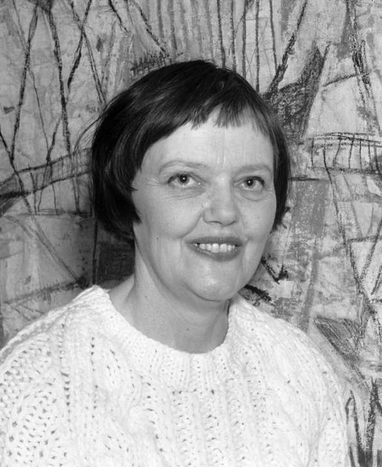
- Synnøve Anker Aurdal in 1964
- Born: Synnøve Anker; 8 December 1908; Kristiania, Norway
- Died: 2 April 2000 (aged 91)
- Occupation: Textile artist
- Spouses: Leon Aurdal (m. 1944; died 1949) Ludvig Eikaas (m. 1949)
- Children: Siri Aurdal
- Relatives: Øyvind Anker (brother); Herman Anker (grandfather)
- Awards: Order of St. Olav; Prince Eugen Medal; Arts Council Norway Honorary Award

Synnøve Anker Aurdal (8 December 1908 – 2 April 2000) was a Norwegian textile artist. Her awards include Jacob-prisen, Maihaugenprisen, the Prince Eugen Medal, Arts Council Norway Honorary Award, and the Order of St. Olav.

== Early and personal life ==
Anker Aurdal was born in Kristiania (now Oslo), Norway to Nils Botvid Anker (1878–1943) and Gudrun Nilssen (1875–1958). She was the sister of librarian Øyvind Anker (1904–1989) and granddaughter of educator Herman Anker (1839–1896). She was married to painter Leon Aurdal (1890–1949) from 1944 until his death in 1949. They had the daughter Siri Aurdal (1937–2026), a sculptor and painter. She was married to painter and sculptor Ludvig Eikaas (1920–2010) from 1949. She received private schooling in Lillehammer and studied at the State Women's Industrial School (Statens lærerhøgskole i forming) in Oslo from 1932 to 1934.

== Career ==
In 1941 Anker Aurdal had her first exhibition in the Oslo Association of Artists. Her works include Flammedans from 1955, Blå rytmer from 1956 and Telegram from 1968. In 1958, she jointly won the competition for the textile decoration of Håkonshallen in Bergen. Her work Høyseteteppet (1958–1961) appears in Håkonshallen together with works by artists Sigrun Berg and Ludvig Eikaas. She represented Norway at the Venice Biennale in 1982. Her work The Sun (1968) is included in the Tangen collection at Kunstsilo in Kristiansand.

She was awarded the Jacob-prisen in 1967, and Maihaugenprisen in 1969. In 1978, she received the Oslo City art award (Oslo bys kunstnerpris). She was decorated Knight, First Class of the Order of St. Olav in 1980.

In 1990, she received the Prince Eugen Medal, and in 1991 the Arts Council Norway Honorary Award (Norsk kulturråds ærespris).
