= Per Erland Berg Wendelbo =

Norwegian botanist (1927–1981)

- Born: 19 September 1927; Oslo, Norway
- Died: 25 September 1981 (aged 54)
- Occupation: Botanist
- Mother: Sigrun Berg
- Relatives: Paal Berg (grandfather)

Per Erland Berg Wendelbo (19 September 1927 – 25 September 1981) was a Norwegian botanist. He was born in Oslo, a son of physician Per Kristian Lund Wendelbo and textile designer Sigrun Berg, and grandson of judge and politician Paal Berg. He was appointed professor of botany at the University of Gothenburg from 1965 to 1981, and was a specialist on Southwestern Asian flora. Among his publications are The Ariamehr Botanical Garden Handbook from 1974 and Tulips and Irises of Iran and their relatives from 1977.

In 1959, he first published Iris cycloglossa from Afghanistan, in 'Biologiske Skrifter' 10(3): 187.

== Selected publications ==
- Wendelbo, Per (1966). "New taxa and synonyms in Allium and Nectaroscordum of S.W. Asia". Acta Horti Gotoborgensis. 28 (2): 15–55.
