= Rolf Aamot =

Norwegian painter and photographer (1934–2024)

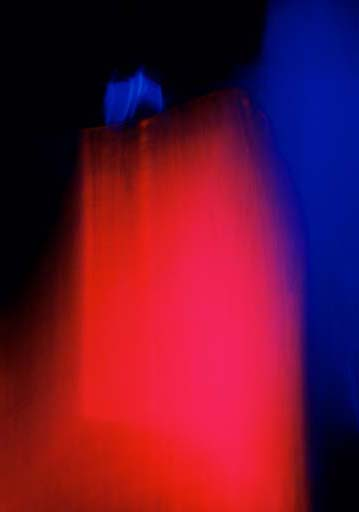
- The Fall, digital photopainting, 180 cm × 120 cm, Rolf Aamot, 2002–2003
- Born: Rolf Aamot; 28 September 1934; Bergen, Norway
- Died: February 26, 2024 (aged 89)
- Known for: Painting, photography
- Notable work: Tide (1998)

Rolf Aamot (28 September 1934 – 26 February 2024) was a Norwegian painter, film director, photographer and tonal-image (Note: Published by The Bergen Museum of Art 1998: Electromagnetic energy shapes the colour/photone and curvilineartone span of tonal image art. The laserpower radiance of atoms. The imagetone quantumsystem turns everything into sinewy relations – signalling movement to all our cells. The body builds its world by psychophysiological images. We exist, and exist in, the infinity of perception – matter, identity, intensity, rhythm, and the logic of the cells of our bodies - opening towards the heterogeneous, the void and the exile. The tones of images are, like tones of sound, a unity of dream and act. The information value of imagetones are determined by their frequencies, span, coherence, pulseform, modulation and polarization. The directionality pulse of particlewaves are sinusoidal. Painting/Tonal Image with Laserbrush and Laserfrequency Palette (full text) by Rolf Aamot.) composer. Since the 1950s, Aamot had been a pioneer within the field of electronic painting, exploring the emerging technology as it combines with the traditional arts of painting, music, film, theatre, and ballet. Aamot studied painting at the Oslo National Academy of the Arts (Norwegian National Academy of Craft and Art Industry and Norwegian National Academy of Fine Arts), and film at Dramatiska Institutet in Stockholm. Aamot is known for his work as a painter, electronic painter, art photographer, graphic artist, film director, tonal-image composer and cultural author.

Much of his work consists of creating electronic tonal images and thus his work contains elements of photography but is hard to pigeon hole. It is frequently a form of performance art with abstract photographic elements. Since 1966, Aamot's works have been displayed in Scandinavia, France (Paris), Berlin (Germany), Brussels (Belgium), Venice (Italy), Moscow (Soviet Union and subsequently Russia), Kraków (Poland), the United States and Japan. His work can be found in several important public collections. Aamot has been represented at several international film and art festivals throughout the world.

== Background ==
Aamot was, from a very early age, taught after Bauhaus principles by his father Randulf Aamot, a master carpenter and wood carver. In 1952, he had his first solo exhibit of paintings at the Paus Knudsen Gallery in Bergen. In 1953, at the age of 18, while still attending the Norwegian National Academy of Craft and Art Industry in Oslo, he was awarded a major public commission for the Natural History Museum at the University of Oslo. (Note: Translation of part of article (with one illustration of Rolf Aamot's frescoes at the Natural History Museum in Oslo) in La Lettre de l'OCIM n° 77: 'The frescoes in the Paleontological Museum in Oslo - a special case'. In 1955 [sic] (competition 1953, frescoes finished 1955) a young student at the Norwegian National Academy of Craft and Art Industry, Rolf Aamot, was chosen, by means of a competition, to paint dinosaurs and other creatures of the Secondary (Mesozoic) Era on the walls of the museum. These paintings were originally meant to be an as exact reconstruction as possible, following the scientific advice of the paleontologist Anatol Heintz. Aamot's initial drawings were practically "naturalist reconstructions" but the artist were to let them evolve into a painting of "the soul of the dinosaurs". When contemplating these frescoes today the visitor experiences the same sensations as when facing any other work of art. These dinosaurs are first of all what the artist wanted to create, before being "representations". Rolf Aamot's frescoes are the testimony of an artist on a scientific subject. Emmanuelle Huet, Des dinosaures en représentation.) From 1957 until 1960, he studied at the Norwegian National Academy of Fine Arts with the painters Aage Storstein and Alexander Schultz, both of them firmly anchored in the effort to combine figuration and abstraction typical of the 1920s. He later studied Film at the Dramatic Institute in Stockholm.

== Electronic art in television ==
Aamot's electronic tonal-image work "Evolution" (1966) with music by Arne Nordheim was shown on Norwegian television in 1967. "Evolution" represented a milestone of a new art form in which television for the first time was used as an independent picture-artistic means of expression. Throughout the 1960s, 1970s, and 1980s, Aamot created a series of works for television.

== Video art and digital photopaintings ==
Aamot became a controversial artist in the 1960s and 1970s. From the latter half of the 1980s, he worked with computer paintings on canvas, digital photopaintings and graphic art. He has continued to make video and film art, often in collaboration with the painter and composer Bjørg Lødøen and the photographer, dancer and choreographer Kristin Lodoen Linder.

== Tonal-image compositions for screen ==
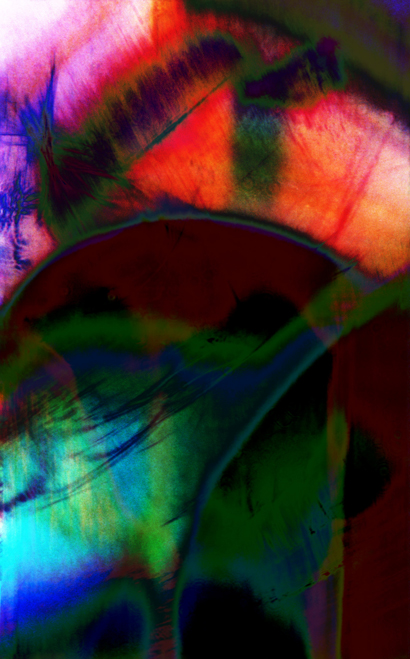
Blood and Earth, electronic painting, 150 cm × 100 cm by Rolf Aamot, 2008.

=== Television ===
- "Evolution" (1966)
- "Relieff nr.2" (1967–68)
- "BSK" (1968)
- "Visual" (1971)
- "Progress" (1977)
- "Structures" (1979)
- "Medusa" (1986)
- "Puls" (1986)
- "Close cluster" (Nærklang) (1987)
- "Expulsion" (1987)

=== Cinema ===
- "Relieff" (1966–67)
- "Kinetic Energy" (1967–68)
- "Vision" (1969)
- "Structures" (1970)
- "Actio" (1980)
- "Aurora Borealis" (1991)
- "Tide" (2000)
- "Energy" (2003)
- "U" (2005)
- "Ir" (2006)
- "Wirr" (2008)
- "Contra" (2009)
- "X" (2010)
