= Robert Esdaile =

Canadian-Norwegian architect

Robert Clarke Esdaile (24 October 1918 – 1987) was a Canadian-Norwegian architect.

Esdaile was born in Toronto, and mainly took his education at McGill University, but also studied at Cambridge. From 1947 to 1948 he was a lecturer at McGill University.

Esdaile came to Norway in 1948, working in Bærum Municipality. In 1954 he was hired in the architect firm Astrup og Hellern, starting his own firm already in 1955. He lectured at the Oslo School of Architecture from 1965 to 1971, and was a professor of architecture at the Norwegian Institute of Technology from 1971 to his death in 1987.

Esdaile was also an accomplished painter and sculptor. His son Peter Esdaile followed in his artistic footsteps.
