= Herman Scheel =

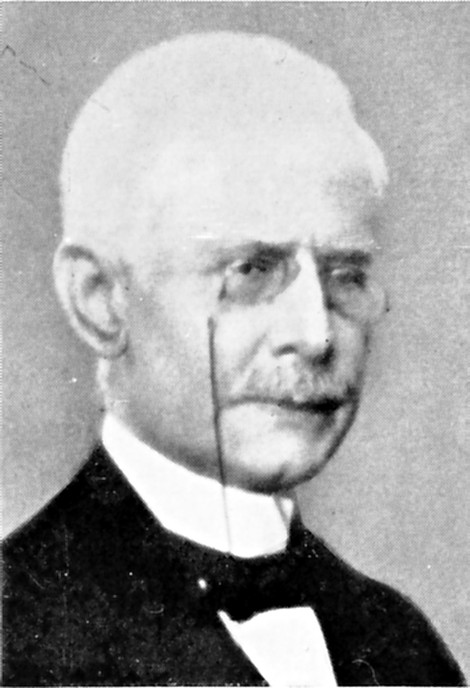

Chief Justice of the Supreme Court of Norway
- In office 1920–1929
- Preceded by: Karenus K. Thinn
- Succeeded by: Paal Berg

Minister of Justice
- In office 2 February 1910 – 20 February 1912
- Prime Minister: Wollert Konow
- Preceded by: Johan Castberg
- Succeeded by: Fredrik Stang

Personal details
- Born: Herman Carsten Johannes Scheel; 18 January 1859 Hamar, Hedmark, Sweden-Norway
- Died: 29 September 1956 (aged 97)
- Party: Conservative
- Spouse: Sara Leonore Sandberg
- Children: Elisabeth Scheel

Herman Carsten Johannes Scheel (18 January 1859 – 29 September 1956) was a Norwegian judge and politician for the Conservative Party.

He was born at Hamar in Hedmark, Norway. He was the elder brother of the portrait painter Signe Scheel (1860–1942). He was married to Sara Leonore Sandberg. He is a great-grandfather of Georg Scheel.

Scheel enrolled at the Royal Frederick University from 1876 and graduated with the cand.jur. degree in 1881. Following studies in Berlin and London, he was from 1887 a research fellow and lecturer at the Royal Frederick University. He took the dr.juris degree in 1892, and was temporarily appointed professor from 1893 to 1898, while professor Francis Hagerup was Minister of Justice and the Police and Prime Minister. Scheel later became Minister of Justice, from 1910 to 1912 in the centre-right Konow's Cabinet.

Notable scholarly publications include Om ægtefællers formuesforhold and Forelæsninger over norsk tingsret. He was Supreme Court Assessor from 1889 to 1910 and from 1912. From 1920 to 1929 he was the 11th Chief Justice of the Supreme Court.

Political offices
Preceded by Johan Castberg	Norwegian Minister of Justice and the Police; 1910–1912	Succeeded by Fredrik Stang
Legal offices
Preceded by Karenus Kristofer Thinn	Chief Justice of the Supreme Court of Norway; 1920–1929	Succeeded by Paal Berg
