= Aage Storstein =

Norwegian artist

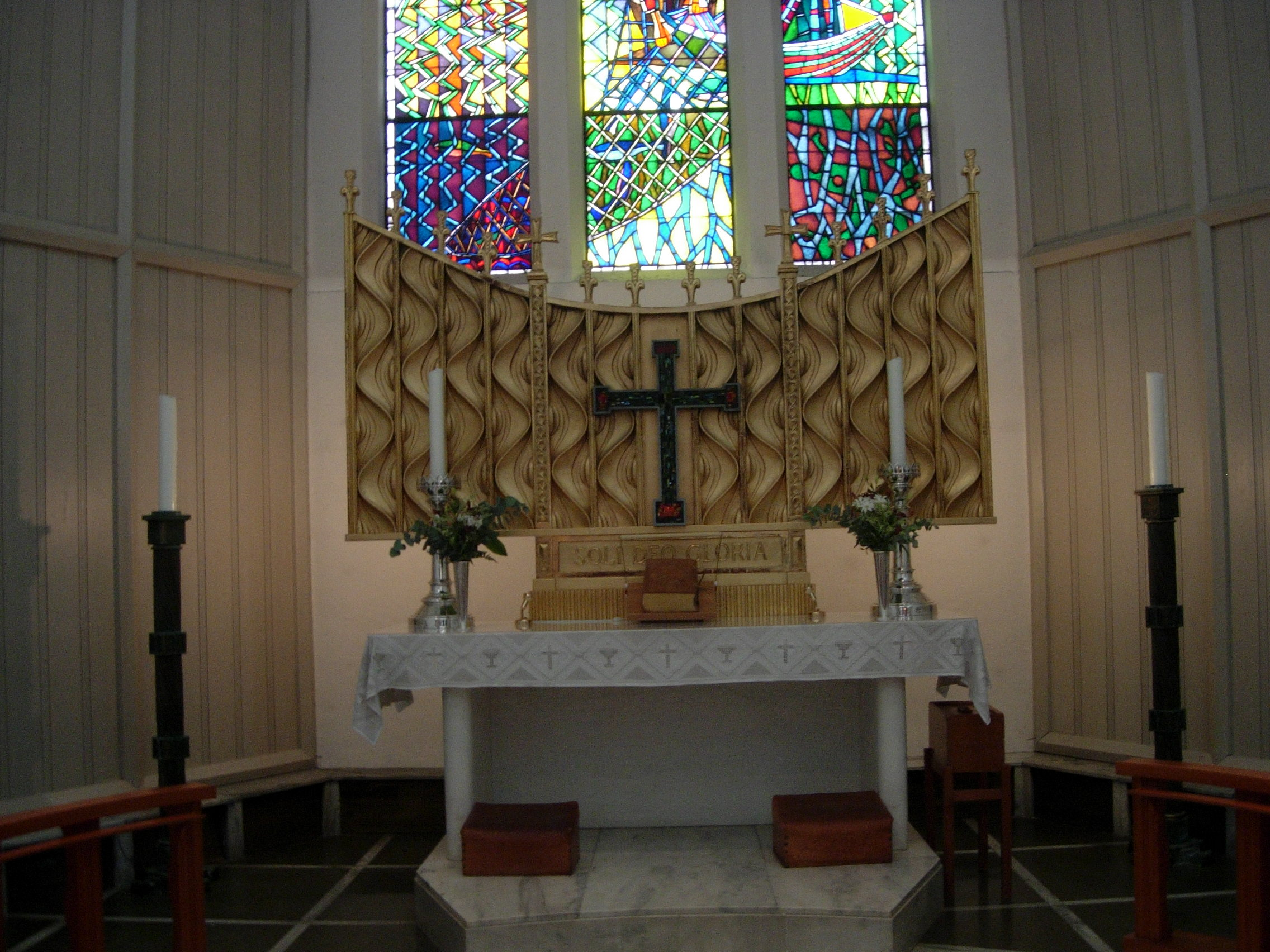
Stained glass behind the altar in Bodø Cathedral was designed by the artist Aage Storstein

Aage Storstein (26 July 1900 – 7 May 1983) was a Norwegian artist.

Aage Storstein was born in Stavanger in the county of Rogaland, Norway. Aage Storstein studied in Paris at Academie Ranson, Académie de la Grande Chaumière, and Academie Colarossi during 1920 and 1921, and in 1926 under Henrik Sørensen and Per Krohg. He debuted at the Autumn Exhibition (Høstutstillingen) where his art was featured 12 times between 1924 and 1983. His exhibited at the World Exhibition in Paris in 1937. Starting in 1946, Storstein taught art at the Norwegian National Academy of Fine Arts with his students including Rolf Aamot, Halvdan Ljøsne and Gunnar S. Gundersen.

Storstein won the 1938 competition for the decoration of the West Gallery in the Oslo City Hall which he completed for the official inauguration in 1950. He is represented in the Nasjonalgalleriet in Oslo, the National Museum of Art, Architecture and Design, Moderna Museet in Sweden, Rogaland Kunstmuseum in Stavanger, Bergen Billedgalleri and many other major art galleries.

== Literature ==
- Ødegaard, Åse (1992) Aage Storstein. En billedbygger i norsk kunst (Oslo: BONYTT AS) ISBN 82-7039-030-5
- Ødegaard, Åse (2000) Et kunstverk blir til. Aage Storsteins fresker i Oslo Rådhus (Trondheim: Tapir Akademisk Forlag) ISBN 82-519-1625-9
