= Kristin Lodoen Linder =

Norwegian photographer (born 1966)

Kristin Lodoen or Kristin Lødøen (born 18 April 1966 in Lillehammer) is a Norwegian photographer, visual artist, dancer and choreographer.

Linder studied photography at International Center of Photography, part-time studies, New York, 1997–2002, and dance at Martha Graham School of Contemporary Dance, New York, 1990–1995. She also studied choreography at State University of New York at Purchase in 1992/93, and dance at Kunsthøgskolen in Oslo, BFA, 1987–90. Kristin Linder has been a dancer in Martha Graham Dance Company, New York, 1997–2001. She is known as a photographer, visual artist, dancer and dancephotographer for several dance companies in New York. Her artistic background gives unique possibilities in regards to communicating movement/dance. This is evident in her work as a visual artist. She has participated in several exhibitions and Festivals in the US and Europe.

== Represented ==
Norwegian Museum of Photography, Norway, "TIDE", Nationalmuseum of Art, Norway "TIDE", Yamagata International Documentary Festival, database, Japan

== Group exhibits ==
- Biennale Internazionale dell Arte Contemporanea
- Florence Biennale, Italy, w/TIDE, in collaboration with Rolf Aamot, 2007
- International Print Triennial, Vienna, Austria, 2007
- Gallery Loch Camelota, Festival of Light, Kraków, Poland, 2004
- International Center of Photography, Education Gallery, New York, 2004
- Norwegian Museum of Photography, Preus Museum, Participated in exhibit: Rolf Aamot, "A feeling of deep pain", 2003–04
- Fall Exhibition, Bergen Artmuseum, Norway, w/TIDE, in collaboration with Rolf Aamot, 2000
- Short Film Festival, Grimstad, Norway, w/TIDE, in collaboration with Rolf Aamot, 2000
- Bergen International Film Festival, Norway, w/TIDE, in collaboration with Rolf Aamot, 2000

== Selected works ==
- Choreography: ”Irreversible Steps” (1991), ”Searching for a Footprint” (1992), ”Tide”, i samarbeid med billedkunstner og regisør Rolf Aamot

== Awards ==
- UTSNITT 2006, silver in the Category; This Year's Newcomer.

== Literature ==
- Direct Art Magazine, oktober 2005
