= Herman Fleischer Høst =

Norwegian physician

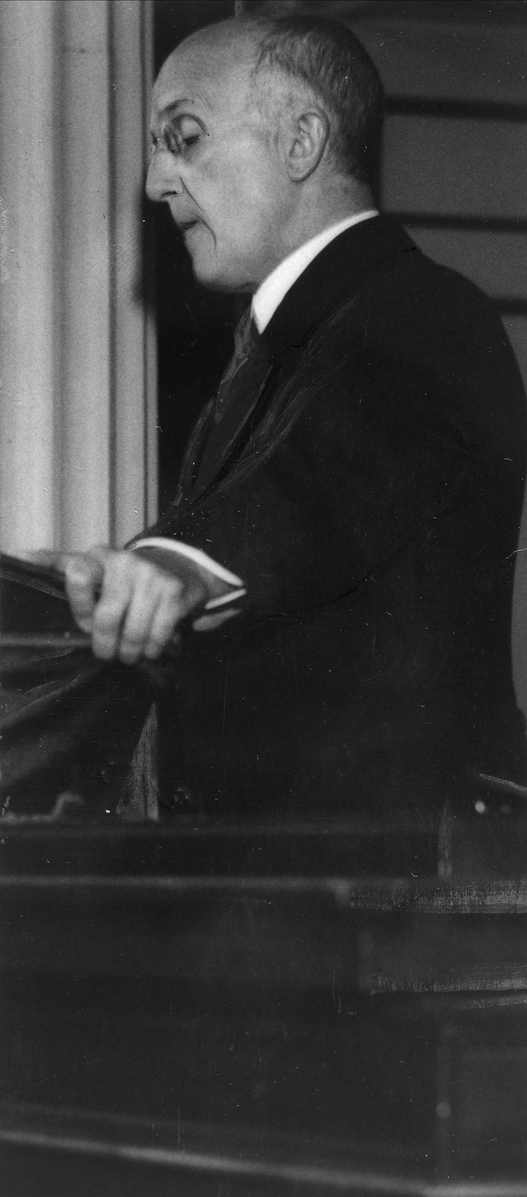
Herman in the 1930s

Herman Fleischer Høst (12 November 1883 – 4 September 1980) was a Norwegian physician.

== Biography ==
He was born at Frederikshald (now Halden) in Østfold, Norway. He was the son of Jens Ludvig Høst (1814–1894) and Marie La Roche Fleischer (1853–1908). He graduated artium in 1903 from Kristiania Cathedral School. He graduated with the cand.med. degree in 1909 and took the dr.med. degree in 1917 both from the University of Kristiania. He worked at Bergen sykehus (now Haukeland University Hospital) in Bergen from 1916 to 1919 and in Kristiania from 1919. From 1924 to 1951 he was a chief physician at Bærum sykehus (now Vestre Viken Hospital Trust), residing at Høvik and Stabekk.

He is credited with introducing blood sugar tests in type 2 diabetes patients in Norway in 1916, the modern blood transfusion and blood type tests in Norway in 1919, as well as insulin treatment of diabetes patients in Norway. From 1936 to 1954 he was also the chief physician in the National Insurance Administration.

He was decorated with the Royal Norwegian Order of St. Olav. He became blind at the age of 70. He lived to the age of 96 and was buried in Vår Frelsers gravlund. He was married to Gudrun Rasmussen (1888–1976). They were the parents of Dr Herman Høst and university professor Gerd Høst Heyerdahl (1915-2007).
