= Paal Berg =

Norwegian politician (1873–1968)

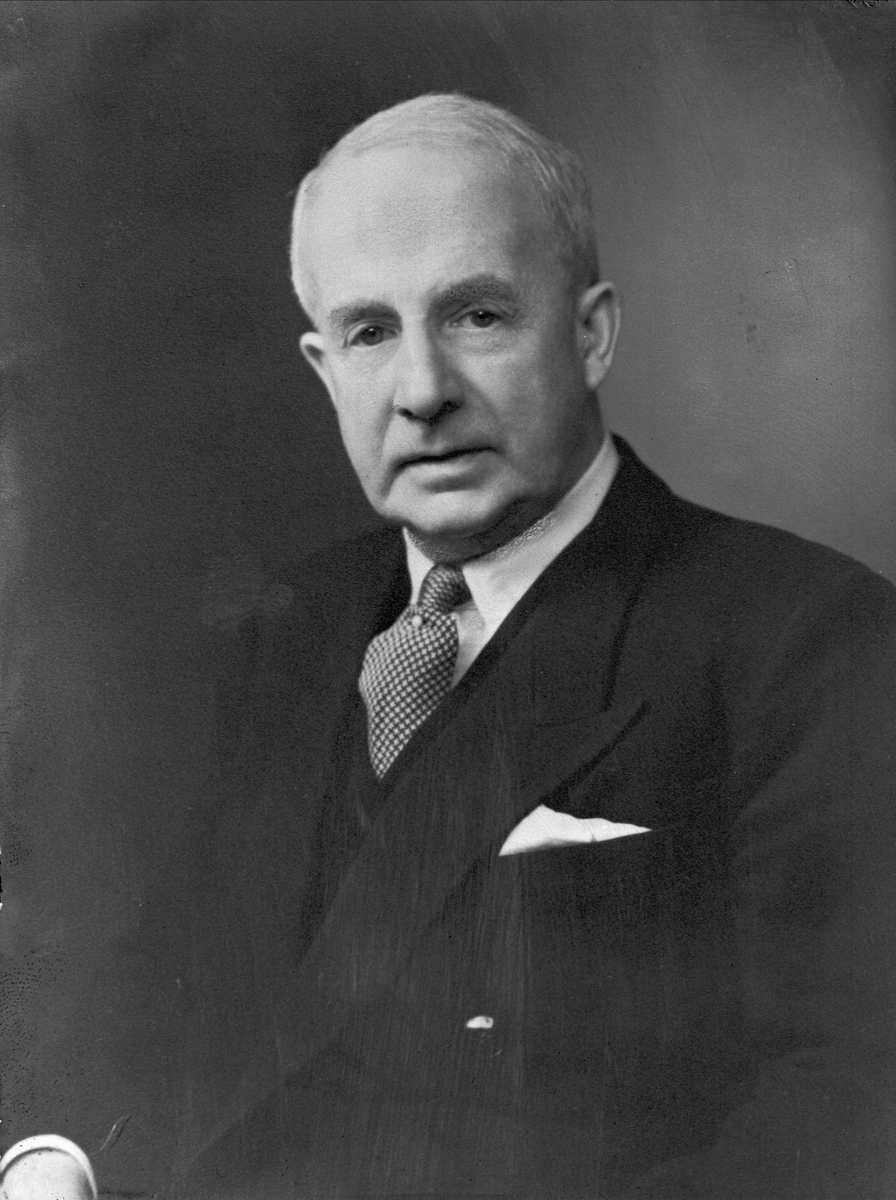
- Paal Berg (by Thorleif Wardenær / Oslo Museum)

Chief Justice of the Supreme Court of Norway
- In office 1929–1946
- Preceded by: Herman Scheel
- Succeeded by: Emil Stang jr.

Minister of Justice
- In office 25 July 1924 – 5 March 1926
- Prime Minister: J. L. Mowinckel
- Preceded by: Christian L. Rolfsen
- Succeeded by: Ingolf E. Christensen

Minister of Social Affairs
- In office 20 February 1919 – 21 June 1920
- Prime Minister: Gunnar Knudsen
- Preceded by: Lars Abrahamsen
- Succeeded by: Odd Klingenberg

Personal details
- Born: Paal Olav Berg; 18 January 1873 Hammerfest, Finnmark, United Kingdoms of Sweden and Norway
- Died: 24 May 1968 (aged 95) Bærum, Akershus, Norway
- Party: Liberal
- Spouse: Caroline Juliane Debes (m. 1898)
- Children: Sigrun Berg
- Occupation: Judge; Politician; Resistance leader

Paal Olav Berg (18 January 1873 – 24 May 1968), born in Hammerfest, was a Norwegian politician for the Liberal Party. He was Minister of Social Affairs 1919–1920, and Minister of Justice 1924–1926. He was the 12th Chief Justice of the Supreme Court from 1929 to 1946.

Paal Berg was instrumental in the German Dismissal of pro-Nazi puppet regime of Vidkun Quisling to be replaced by a council of Norwegian citizens, including himself on April 15, 1940. This was overseen after April 24 by Hitler's appointee Josef Terboven. Despite holding this position in the occupied government, Berg was far from a collaborator. Indeed, William L. Shirer names him the secret leader of the Norwegian Resistance. He was elected a Foreign Honorary Member of the American Academy of Arts and Sciences in 1947. He was a member of the Norwegian Association for Women's Rights.

== Literature ==
- William L. Shirer: "The Rise and Fall of the Third Reich", Simon & Schuster, New York 1990 ISBN 0-671-72868-7
- Hem, Per E (2012). Megleren: Paal Berg 1873-1968. Oslo: Aschehoug. ISBN 978-82-03-23427-9.

Political offices
Preceded by Lars Kristian Abrahamsen	Norwegian Minister of Social Affairs; 1919–1920	Succeeded by Odd Sverressøn Klingenberg
Preceded by Christian Lange Rolfsen	Norwegian Minister of Justice and the Police; 1924–1926	Succeeded by Ingolf Elster Christensen
Legal offices
Preceded by Herman Scheel	Chief Justice of the Supreme Court of Norway; 1929–1946	Succeeded by Emil Stang
