= Gunnar S. Gundersen =

Norwegian artist (1921–1983)

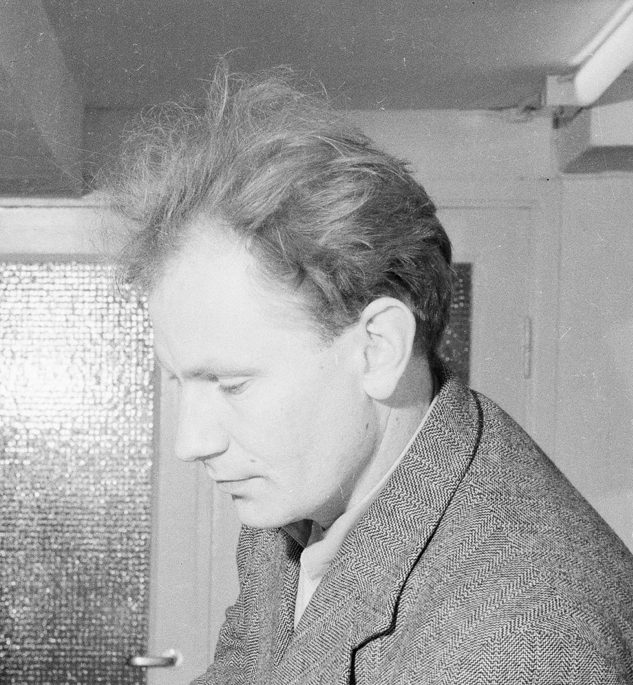
Gunnar S. Gundersen

Gunnar S. Gundersen (25 December 1921 – 16 January 1983) or Gunnar S. (as he came to be known) was a Norwegian modernist painter.

== Biography ==
Gunnar S. Gundersen was born in Førde Municipality in Sogn og Fjordane county, Norway. Gundersen was among the young artists who attended the Oslo National Academy of the Arts in the years after Norway was liberated from Nazi-Germany. He was a pupil of Aage Storstein at the National Art Academy. He made his debut as early as 1947 at the Autumn Exhibition in Oslo.

His generation wanted to free themselves for the traditional Norwegian figurative painting and sought inspiration from leading artists in Europe at the time. Danish artist Richard Mortensen, as well as Auguste Herbin, Serge Poliakoff and Victor Vasarely.

When he chose his modernist form he was quickly acknowledged as one of the leaders in the abstract art form in Norway. Gunnar S. is now regarded as one of the most significant painters of the Norwegian post-war period. Even though he never received the international acclaim he might have deserved, he became a unifying figure among his contemporaries in Norway. His work has been an inspiration for many artists in later generations.

This expression is at first glance a rendition of flat color fields. However, through extensive knowledge of theories of visual perception Gunnar S. is able to transform the color fields into images with a unique spatial quality, what Gunnar S. himself called "inconsistent space."
