= Georg Scheel =

Norwegian barrister (born 1950)

Georg Scheel (born 15 April 1950) is a Norwegian barrister.

He is a great-grandson of Herman Scheel. He finished his secondary education at Ullern in 1969, and graduated from the University of Oslo with the cand.jur. degree in 1974, and gained access to work with Supreme Court cases in 1977. He was a fellow of maritime law at the University of Oslo from 1973 to 1975, and was awarded with a King Olav gold medal for co-writing the book Borerigger i rettslig belysning. He worked in the Office of the Attorney General of Norway from 1975 to 1980 before being hired as a lawyer for the Nordisk Defence Club. He was promoted to deputy director in 1986 and chief executive director of Nordisk Defence Club in 2000.

He is married and has two children, and resides at Nesøya.
