= Mark S. Scarberry =

Law professor

Mark Stephen Scarberry (born May 13, 1953, in Kern County, California) is professor of law at Pepperdine University School of Law. Much of his research and teaching focuses on bankruptcy and constitutional law. Scarberry is "a self-described evangelical Protestant."

== Education ==
Scarberry earned his J.D. from the University of California, Los Angeles School of Law where he graduated number one in his class in 1978 and his A.B. from Occidental College in 1975.

== Professional life ==
Mark Scarberry began his legal career upon graduation from UCLA, gaining four years' practice experience with Jones, Day, Reavis & Pogue, Los Angeles. Scarberry has edited law casebooks. During the fall of 2007, Scarberry was a Robert M. Zinman Resident Scholar at the American Bankruptcy Institute. Scarberry is also lead author for "Business Reorganization in Bankruptcy" which is currently in its 4th edition, an American Casebook Series published by West. Scarberry has testified before a subcommittee of the United States Senate and a subcommittee of the United States House of Representatives.
