= Leon Aurdal =

Norwegian painter

- Born: 23 January 1890; Bergen, Norway
- Died: 25 January 1949 (aged 59)
- Occupation: Painter
- Spouse: Synnøve Anker Aurdal

Leon Aurdal (23 January 1890 – 25 January 1949) was a Norwegian painter.

== Life and career ==
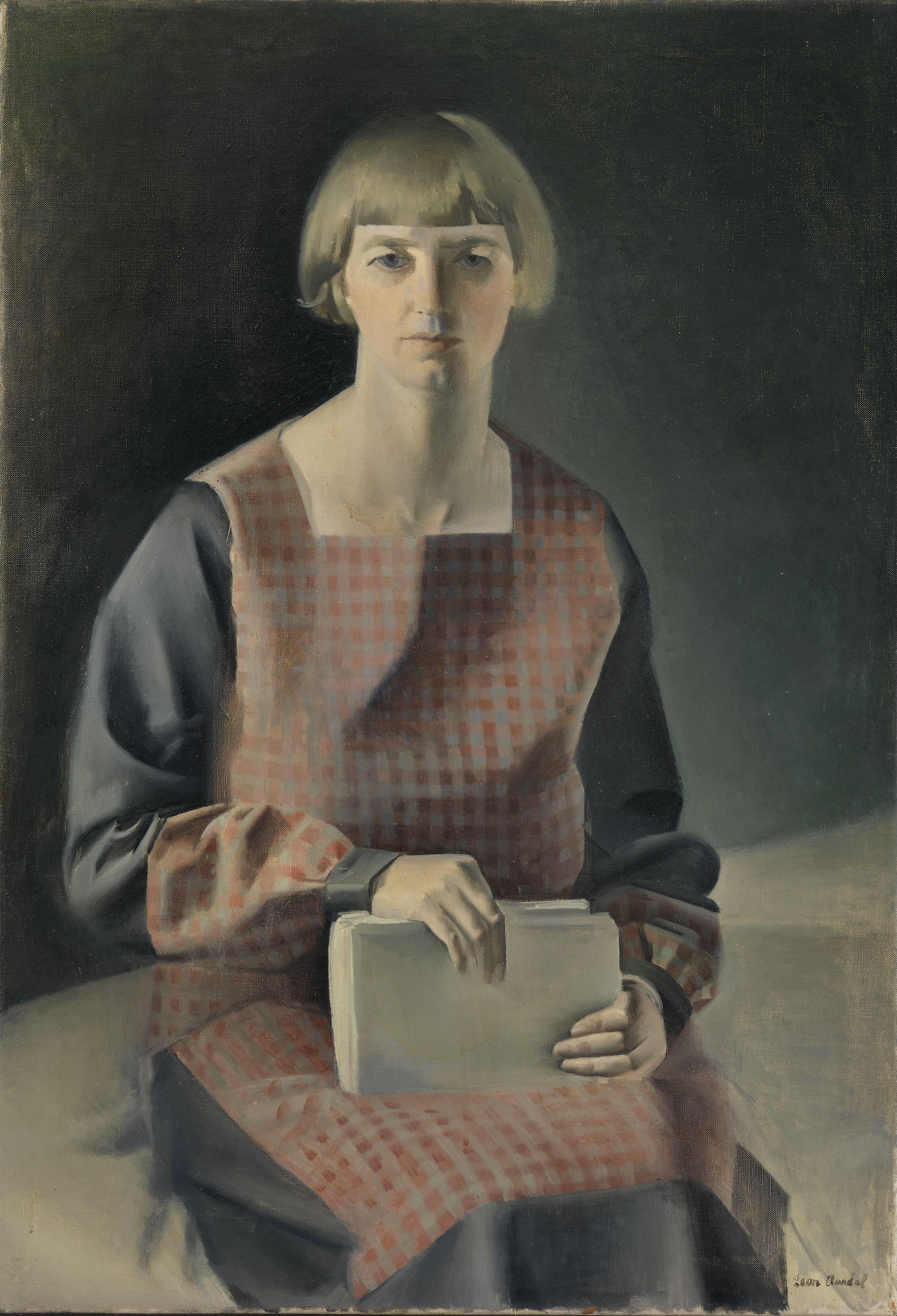
Painting of a young woman (1925) by Aurdal

He was born in Bergen to Bastian Aurdal and Severine Grebstad. He was married twice, first to Kristmar Aurdal, and from 1944 to textile artist Synnøve Anker Aurdal. His works include Sittende ung dame from 1925, Semsvatnet from 1938, and På lokalbåten from 1945, all at the National Gallery of Norway. He is also represented in galleries in Bergen, Trondheim, Stavanger, Fredrikstad and Drammen.
