= Halvdan Ljøsne =

Norwegian painter (1929–2006)

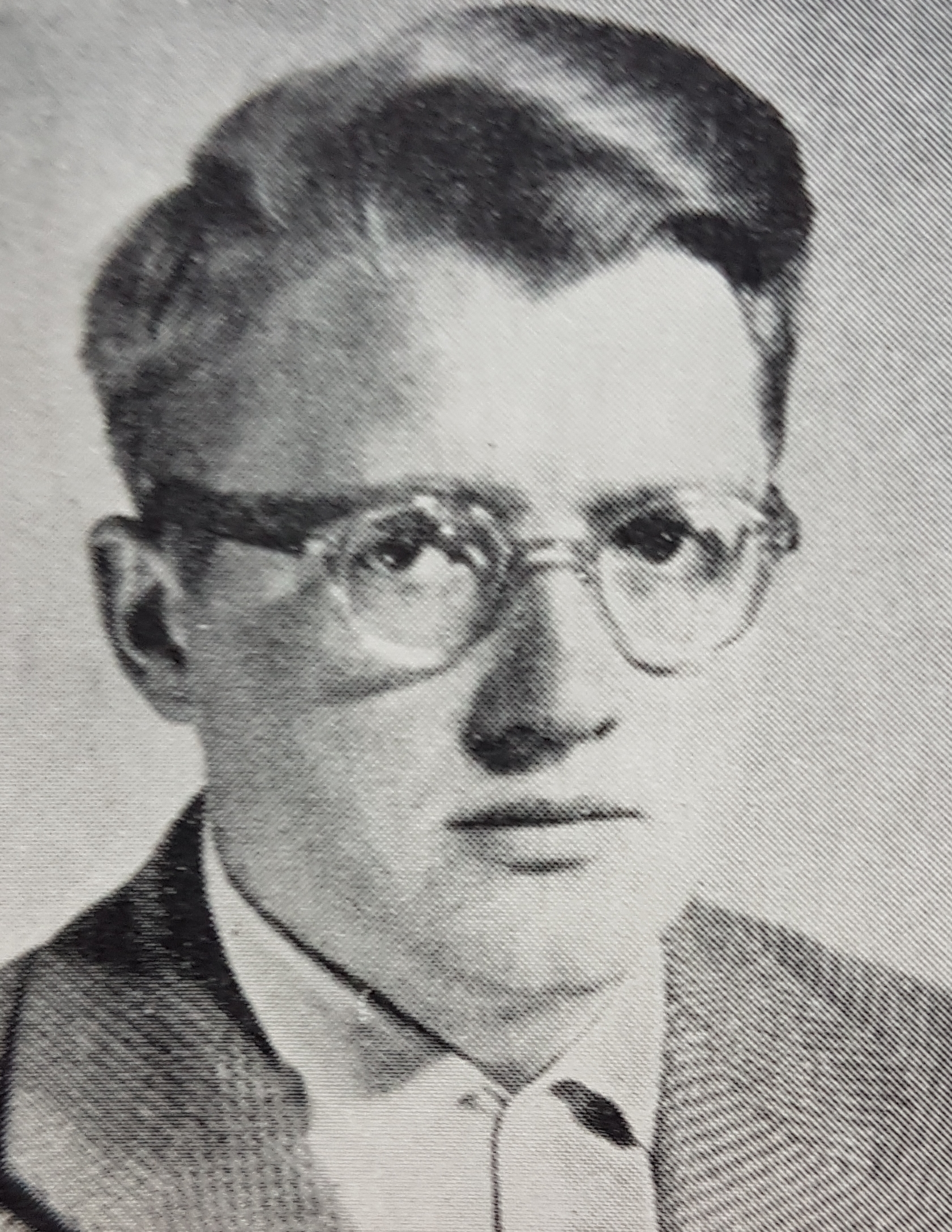
Halvdan Ljøsne IKL

Halvdan Ljøsne (31 May 1929 in Vågå Municipality, Oppland – 6 February 2006) was a Norwegian painter.

He was born in Vågå Municipality. He took his education at the Norwegian National Academy of Craft and Art Industry from 1949 to 1950, the Norwegian National Academy of Fine Arts from 1950 to 1953 (under Aage Storstein and Jean Heiberg) and the Academie Ranson from 1953 to 1954. He worked as a lecturer at the Norwegian Institute of Technology from 1958 to 1967. He was then a professor at the National Academy of Fine Arts from 1967 to 1983, serving as rector from 1974 to 1977. He is represented with nine works in the National Museum of Art, Architecture and Design.

He settled at Haslum, and died in February 2006.
