= Herman Høst =

Norwegian physician (1926–2023)

Herman Høst (17 April 1926 – 14 September 2023) was a Norwegian physician.

Høst was born in Bærum as a son of physician Herman Fleischer Høst. He graduated with the cand.med. degree in 1951 and took the dr.med. degree in 1966. He was a chief physician at the Norwegian Radium Hospital from 1974 and a professor of radiological cancer therapy at the University of Oslo from 1975. From 1980 to 1985 he was the dean of the Faculty of Medicine. He was also a member of the Norwegian Academy of Science and Letters. He retired in 1996. Høst died on 14 September 2023, at the age of 97.
