= Janet Scheel =

American physicist

Janet D. Scheel is an American physicist whose research concerns pattern formation and turbulence in Rayleigh–Bénard convection. She is Ezra Frederick Scattergood Professor of Physics at Occidental College, and chair of the Department of Physics at Occidental.

Scheel majored in physics at the University of Illinois Urbana-Champaign, graduating in 1991. After a 1994 master's degree at Cornell University, she completed a Ph.D. at the California Institute of Technology in 2007, with the dissertation Rotating Rayleigh-Bénard Convection, supervised by Michael C. Cross.

She taught at California Lutheran University before moving to Occidental College in 2008. In 2008, she was a recipient of a Cottrell College Science Award from the Research Corporation.
