= Ludvig Eikaas =

Norwegian artist (1920–2010)

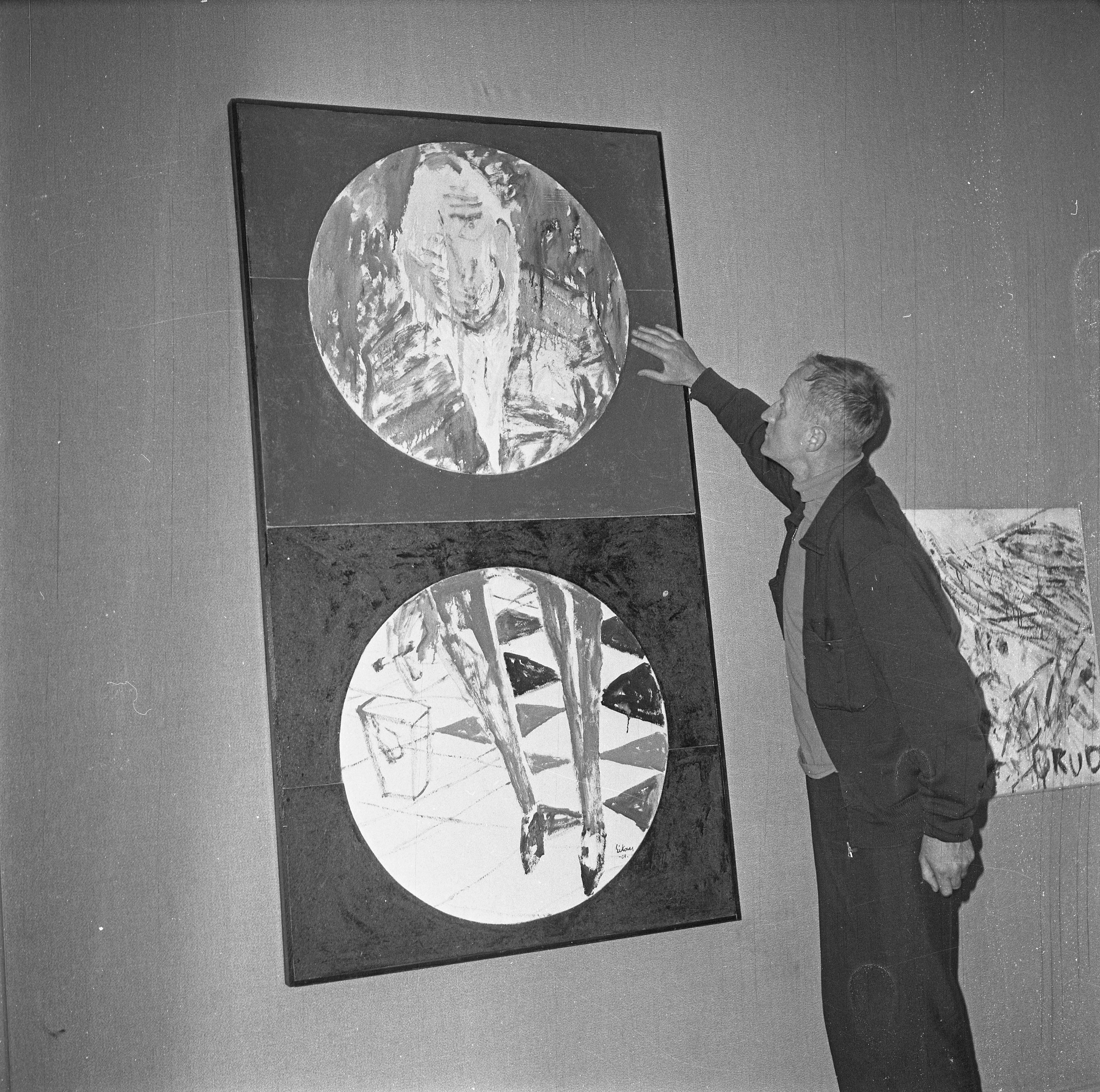
Ludvig Eikaas in 1969 Credit: Eirik Sundvor/Trondheim byarkiv

Ludvig Eikaas (20 December 1920 – 5 September 2010) was a Norwegian painter, graphic artist and sculptor. Eikaas was among the first artists in Norway to work in a purely non-figurative idiom.

== Biography ==
Ludvig Eikaas was born in the small hamlet of Eikaas in Jølster Municipality in Sogn og Fjordane, Norway. He studied at the National College of Art and Design (1942–46), then at the National Art Academy and at the Art Academy in Copenhagen (1948).

Throughout his life as an artist, Eikaas showed great latitude in his choice of techniques and motifs. Few Norwegian artists in the postwar period showed so much imagination and curiosity. Eikaas' imagination was frequently paired with an irrepressible sense of humor. Eikaas debuted at the National Exhibition Fall 1946 and distinguished himself quickly as one of postwar most original and important Norwegian artists. Along with such Gunnar S. Gundersen and Odd Tandberg, he was part of the so-called Dødsgjengen, a group of intrepid and gifted young artists who were in the forefront of non-figurative art in Norway.

Eikaas was professor at the Norwegian National Academy of Fine Arts from 1970, and principal in the period 1981–83. Working within non-figurative art, he is considered one of the most important Norwegian artists in the post-World War II era. Work by Louis Eikaas is represented in the National Museum of Art, Architecture and Design in Oslo, the Bergen Museum of Art & Science, Henie-Onstad Art Centre, Statens Museum for Kunst in Copenhagen, the Brooklyn Museum of Art, New York, the Uffizi in Florence, Italy

== Personal life ==
Eikaas became a Knight, First Class of the Royal Norwegian Order of St. Olav. He was married to noted Norwegian textile artist, Synnøve Anker Aurdal (1908-2000).

== Eikaas Gallery ==
At the beginning of the 1990s, Eikaas gave an art collection to his hometown of Jølster in Sogn og Fjordane. A separate gallery where this collection is on display, Eikaas Gallery (Eikaasgalleriet), was opened in 1994. The old dairy on Ålhus was purchased and converted into a modern art gallery, to receive the art collection Eikaas gave the municipality. This collection includes almost 800 works of art. In 2004, Eikaas Gallery consolidated operations with the Sogn og Fjordane Art Museum.

== Other sources ==
- Eikaas, Ludvig Innenfor sirkelen (Gyldendal 1983) ISBN 978-82-05-14745-4
