= Øivind Storm Bjerke =

Norwegian art historian

- Born: 11 March 1953 (age 72); Tønsberg, Norway
- Occupation: art historian

Øivind Storm Bjerke (born 11 March 1953) is a Norwegian art historian. He was born in Tønsberg.

From 1984 to 1989 he worked as intendant of the art society Trondhjems Kunstforening and Trondheim Kunstmuseum. He chaired the organization Kunst på Arbeidsplassen in 1987. From 1989 to 1997 he was amanuensis at the Henie Onstad Kunstsenter, and from 1997 to 2002 he was appointed director of the Preus Museum, the national museum for photography in Horten. He was appointed professor of art history at the University of Oslo in 2002.

His books include treatments of Matthias Stoltenberg (thesis from 1983), Harald Sohlberg (1991), Aase Texmon Rygh (1992), Leonard Rickhard (1995), Håkon Bleken (1997), Harald Kihle (2005), and Arne Ekeland (2008).
