= A. K. Dolven =

Norwegian artist

A K Dolven
- Born: 1953 (age 72–73); Oslo, Norway
- Known for: Painting, video art
- Awards: Prince Eugen Medal
- Website: akdolven.com

A K Dolven (Anne Katrine, born 1953) is a Norwegian artist. She works across painting, film, sound, sculpture and interventions in public space.

She lives in Kvalnes, Norway.

== Life and work ==
Dolven was born and grew up in Oslo but left early to Lofoten, and then on to France in 1972 to study art at École des Beaux-Arts in Aix-en-Provence, and then École nationale supérieure des Beaux-Arts in Paris. She went on to study at the National Academy of the Arts in Oslo.

She lived between Berlin and Lofoten from 1987 to 1997 after receiving the Norwegian Ministry of Foreign Affairs grant to Künstlerhaus Bethanien. From 1997 to 2017, she worked between London and her home in Lofoten; in 2005 she established her Atelier Kvalnes, the base for her international practice. Dolven's photo and video work often shows motifs from this and other places north of the Arctic Circle. She has received media attention for her public sculpture projects and was the initiator of the outdoor sculpture project Artscape Nordland.

She was awarded the German Fred-Thieler Prize in 2000 and the Swedish Prince Eugen Medal in 2005.

=== Selected solo exhibitions ===
(2019) hitting a mountain with snow on my left and right shoulder, Trondheim Kunstmuseum, Norway

(2016) ahead, Svalbard Kunsthalle, Longyearbyen, Norway

(2015) please return, IKON Gallery, Birmingham, UK

(2013) when I discovered the end I wanted to live really long, Kunsthall 44 Moen –Rene Block, Moen, Denmark

(2010) the day the sky became my ground, Sörlandets Kunstmuseum, Norway

(2010) looking for balance, Platform China, Beijing, China

(2007) what can I do for you, Kunstnerforbundet, Oslo, Norway

(2004) DA2 Domus Artium, Salamanca, Spain

(2004) moving mountain, CAC Contemporary Art Centre, Vilnius, Lithuania; AroS, Aarhus Kunstmuseum, Aarhus, Denmark; Bergen Kunsthall, Bergen, Norway

(2004) from last winter, Munch Museum, Oslo, Norway

(2001) South London Gallery, London, UK

(2001) headlights, Henie Onstad Kunstsenter, Oslo, Norway

(2001) stairs, Staatliches Museum Schwerin, Germany

(2001) Kunsthalle Nurnberg, Nürnberg, Germany

(2001) Kunsthalle Bern, Bern, Switzerland

(2001) Kunstnernes Hus, Oslo, Norway

(2000) Fred-Thieler Prize, Berlinische Galerie Berlin, Germany

(1999) Video Gallery, Philadelphia Museum of Art, Philadelphia, USA

(1989) Künstlerhaus Bethanien, Berlin, Germany

Selected group exhibitions

(2019) I Hear Your Dream: Contemporary Art from Norway. OCAT Shanghai, Shanghai, China.

(2019) The Quebec City Biennial: Small Between the Stars, Large Against the Sky, Québec, Canada

(2018) The Thailand Biennale: Edge of the Wonderland, Krabi, Thailand

(2017) Dreamers Awake, White Cube, London

(2016) this is a political (painting), Kunsthall Trondheim, Norway

(2016) The Shadow Never Lies, 21st Minsheng Art Museum, Shanghai, China

(2015) Art/Nature, Museum für Naturkunde Berlin, Germany

(2014) PLAY, Helsinki Art Museum, Helsinki, Finland

(2013) Desire Lines, ACCA The Australian Centre for Contemporary Art, Melbourne, Australia

(2012) Guangzhou Triennial 2012, Guangzhou, China

(2012) New Nordic – Architecture & Identity, Louisiana Museum of Modern Art, Humlebæk, Denmark

(2011) Vidéo & Après, Centre Pompidou, Paris, France

(2009) There is No Road, Laboral Centro de Arte, Gijon, Spain

(2007) Pain, Hamburger Bahnhof, Berlin, Germany

(2006) Melancholie, Genie und wahnsinn in der Kunst, Neue Nationalgalerie, Berlin, Germany

(2004) Berlin/North, Hamburger Bahnhof, Berlin, Germany

(2003) 46664 –1 Minute of Art to Aids, Green Point Stadium, Cape Town, South Africa

(2002) Hollywood Revisited, Aarhus Kunstmueum, Aarhus, Denmark.

(2000) Norden, Kunsthalle Vienna, Austria

(1999) The 6th International Istanbul Biennial, Istanbul, Turkey

(1996) Strangers in the Arctic, AGO, Ontario, Canada

(1990) JETZ BERLIN, Malmö Art Hall, Sweden

(1986) Borealis, DAAD Galerie, Berlin

=== Selected public artworks ===
(2010-2020) Untuned Bell, Honnørbrygga, Oslo, Norway.

(2018) 40 voices, Rankweil, Austria

(2017) Tours voices, CCC, Tours, France

(2014) I found I found, Stormen Cultural Quarter, Bodø, Norway

(2012) Out of Tune, Folkestone, UK

(2011) The Finnish Untuned Bell, Ekenäs, Finland

== Selected collections ==
Her work is included in collections such as The Art Institute of Chicago (USA), Philadelphia Museum of Art (USA), Arts Council Collection (UK), Hoffmann Collection, KIASMA, La Gaia Collection, Goetz Collection, Fundacion Salamanca Ciudad de Cultura (Spain), Kunsthalle Bern (Switzerland), Küpferstichkabinett (Germany), Leipzig Collection of Contemporary Galleries (Germany), Louisiana Museum of Modern Art (Denmark), Malmö Museum (Sweden), Museum of Contemporary Art (Norway), and the Museum of Contemporary Art (Denmark).
