= Trondhjems Kunstforening =

Logo.

Trondhjems Kunstforening (English: Trondhjem Art Society) is an art society in Trondheim, Norway.

It was founded in 1845 on the initiative of Lars Hansen and I. C. Dahl, to promote and display art in Trondhjem. The first exhibition was held in Stiftsgården in 1846. In 1930 the organisation erected its own localities in Bispegata, designed by Peter Daniel Hofflund. In 1996 it was behind the founding of the museum Trondheim Kunstmuseum.
