= Louise Hindsgavl =

Danish artist (born 1973)

- Born: 29 January 1973 (age 53)
- Education: Design School Kolding (1999)
- Known for: Sculpture
- Awards: Young Designers Award (1997); Annie and Otto Detlefs' Award for Young Ceramicists (2006)
- Website: www.louisehindsgavl.dk

Louise Hindsgavl (born 29 January 1973) is a Danish artist who works in ceramic sculpture, porcelain, and stoneware.

== Early life and education ==
Hindsgavl graduated from the Ceramics and Glass Department of Design School Kolding in 1999.

== Career ==
Hindsgavl began her work with ceramics by designing dishes. She later began to create contemporary sculpture. Particularly influenced by Rococo, Hindsgavl's sculptures unexpectedly depict startling and controversial subjects in a medium which is more commonly used for decorative folk art.

Her work has been presented at several museum exhibitions, galleries and international Biennale of Ceramics:

- 2007 Grimmerhus - CLAY Museum of international Ceramic Art, DK
- 2010 BICC, Biennale of Contemporary Ceramics, Vallauris, France
- 2014 Rønnebæksholm - Power, Porcelain, Poetry, Næstved, DK
- 2015 Höganäs Kunsthall & Museum, Höganäs, Sweden - Power. Porcelæn. Poesi.
- 2016 Artmuseum Trapholt, ERUPTURE, Kolding, DK
- 2019 Becoming Undone, Hans Alf Gallery, DK
- 2023 Holmegaard Værk - The Chosen Ones, Holmegaard

For updated list, see artists homepage

== Public Collections ==
- 2009 Represented in the collection of Ny Carlsbergfondet
- 2009 Represented at the World Ceramic Exposition Foundation, South Korea
- 2010 Musée Historique et des Porcelaines, Nyon, Switzerland
- 2010 Musée Ariana (The Swiss Museum of Ceramics and Glass). Geneva, Switzerland
- 2010 National Museum of Sweden, Stockholm, Sweden
- 2010 Sale to the collection of the Victoria and Albert Museum, London, UK
- 2012 ASU Art Museum, Arizona, USA

== Exhibits, catalogues and publications ==
- 2005 Dansk Kunst 2005
- 2006 KeramikMagazinEuropa, vol.28, "Hollow Laughter" by Trine Ross
- 2007 "Kulturo", Spring '07, "I Porcelæn til Anklerne", by Andreas Nielsen
- 2007 "Clay in Art, International, "Burlesque Tableaus" by Jorunn Veiteberg
- 2007 "All Great Things Starts with Blasphemy, Ceramics, Art and Perception, Issue 68, 2007, by Tom Jørgensen
- 2008 "Fragiles, Porcelain, Glass & Ceramics", Gestalten Verlag.
- 2008 "Mod I Ler", interview i Living Design
- 2009 "Contemporary Ceramics", Emmanuel Cooper, Thames & Hudson
- 2009 "101 Kunstnere", JA
- 2009 "Once Upon a Chair", Gestalten Verlag.
- 2011 Cuts & Bruises at SODA, exhibit and catalogue
- 2011 Living with Ceramics, TL magazine, issue 11.

== Grants and awards ==
Hindsgavl was given a Young Designers Award in 1997 by SNBA, Nacional des Belas Artes, Lisbon, Portugal. She received grants from the Foundation of L.F. Foght and from the Foundation of Gudrund og Erik Kauffeldt in 1999. In 2000 and 2001 she received the Grant for Young Artists from the Danish Art Foundation, as well as four subsequent grants in later years. She has also received grants from Danmarks Nationalbanks Jubilæumsfond, The Solar Foundation and the Silkeborg Art association, and the Silversmith Kay Bojesen and wife Erna Bojesens Memorial foundation. In 2004 she received the Biennale Award at the Biennale of Arts and Craft and Design and in 2006 she was presented with the Annie and Otto Detlefs' Award for Young Ceramicists In 2015 she received the Prince Eugen Medal, conferred by the King of Sweden. The Anne Marie Telmany, born Carl-Nielsen, Grant for Female Artists (2018)
