= Winter Night in the Mountains =

Painting by Harald Sohlberg

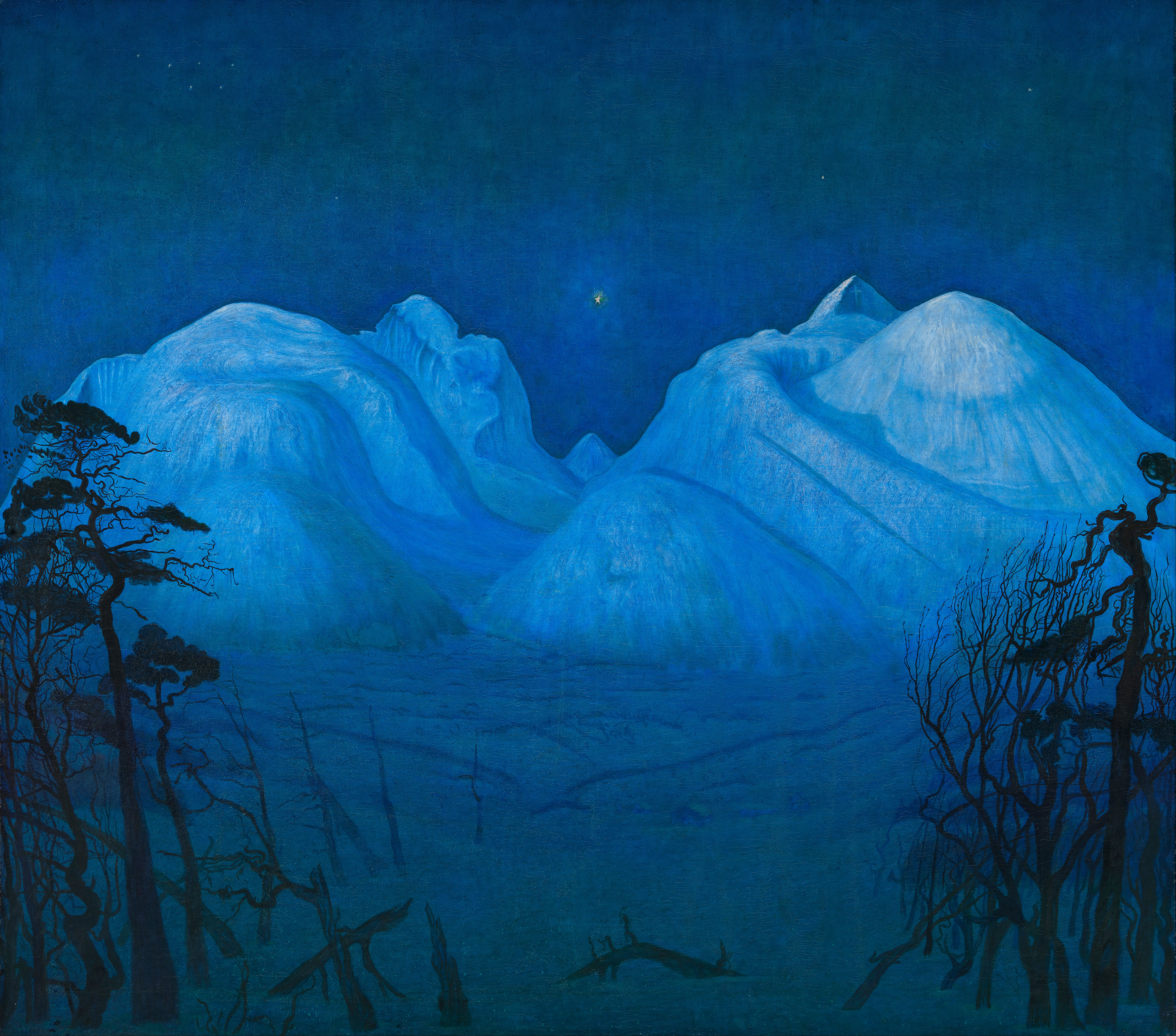
Vinternatt i Rondane, 1914 Nasjonalgalleriet, Oslo

Winter Night in the Mountains (Norwegian: Vinternatt i fjellene), also known as Winter Night in Rondane (Norwegian: Vinternatt i Rondane), is the name of several versions of a composition created in several techniques by the Norwegian artist Harald Sohlberg (1869–1935). The most famous version is an oil painting completed in 1914 and held by the National Gallery in Oslo since 1918.

Sohlberg began to work on the subject in early 1900, after seeing the mountains of Rondane in bluish moonlight while skiing nearby on Easter 1899 or 1900. He moved in 1900 to a house on the Nesset at Atna in the Østerdalen valley in Eastern Norway. He was joined in 1901 by his wife Lilli Rachel Hennum; they remained at Atna until 1902, when they moved further north to Røros Municipality.

He made several studies in the period 1900–1902 in a variety of media, including charcoal, crayon, oil and watercolor. One study is held by the Nationalmuseum in Stockholm. He began work on the oil painting held by the National Gallery in 1911, and completed the work in the winter of 1913–1914. It measures 160 cm × 180.5 cm (63.0 in × 71.1 in). Sohlberg later continued to use the image in other media, such as colour lithography.

The work depicts mountains covered by snow, under a deep blue-black cloudless evening sky. The foreground is framed by the silhouetted limbs of bare weathered trees, but the work is devoid of any sign of humans or animals. At the centre of the symmetrically balanced painting is a single bright star visible in a gap between two mountains. A cross is visible on the snow of a mountain peak to the right.

The painting was completed for the 1914 Jubilee Exhibition at Frogner Manor, where it was a critical and public success. It was acquired by ship owner and art collector Jørgen Breder Stang, who donated to the National Gallery in Oslo in 1918. It underwent major conservation work for its centenary in 2014, which revealed the artist's signature in the bottom right corner.

In 1995, it won a public vote organised by the Norwegian national broadcasting service, NRK, to select Norway's national painting, ahead of the beloved Bridal Procession on the Hardangerfjord by Adolph Tidemand and Hans Gude.

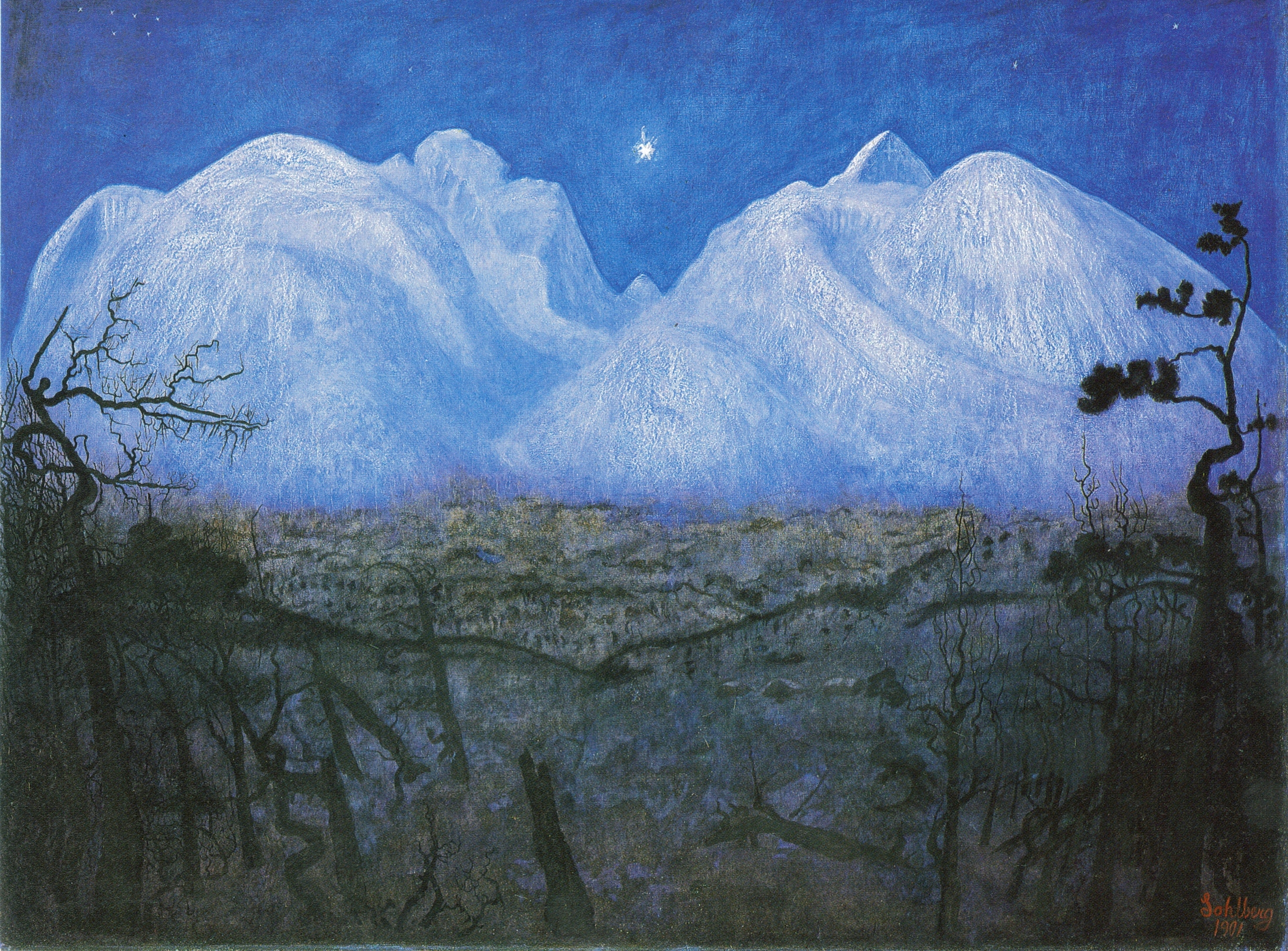
Vinternatt i fjellene (Vinternatt i Rondane), version of 1901

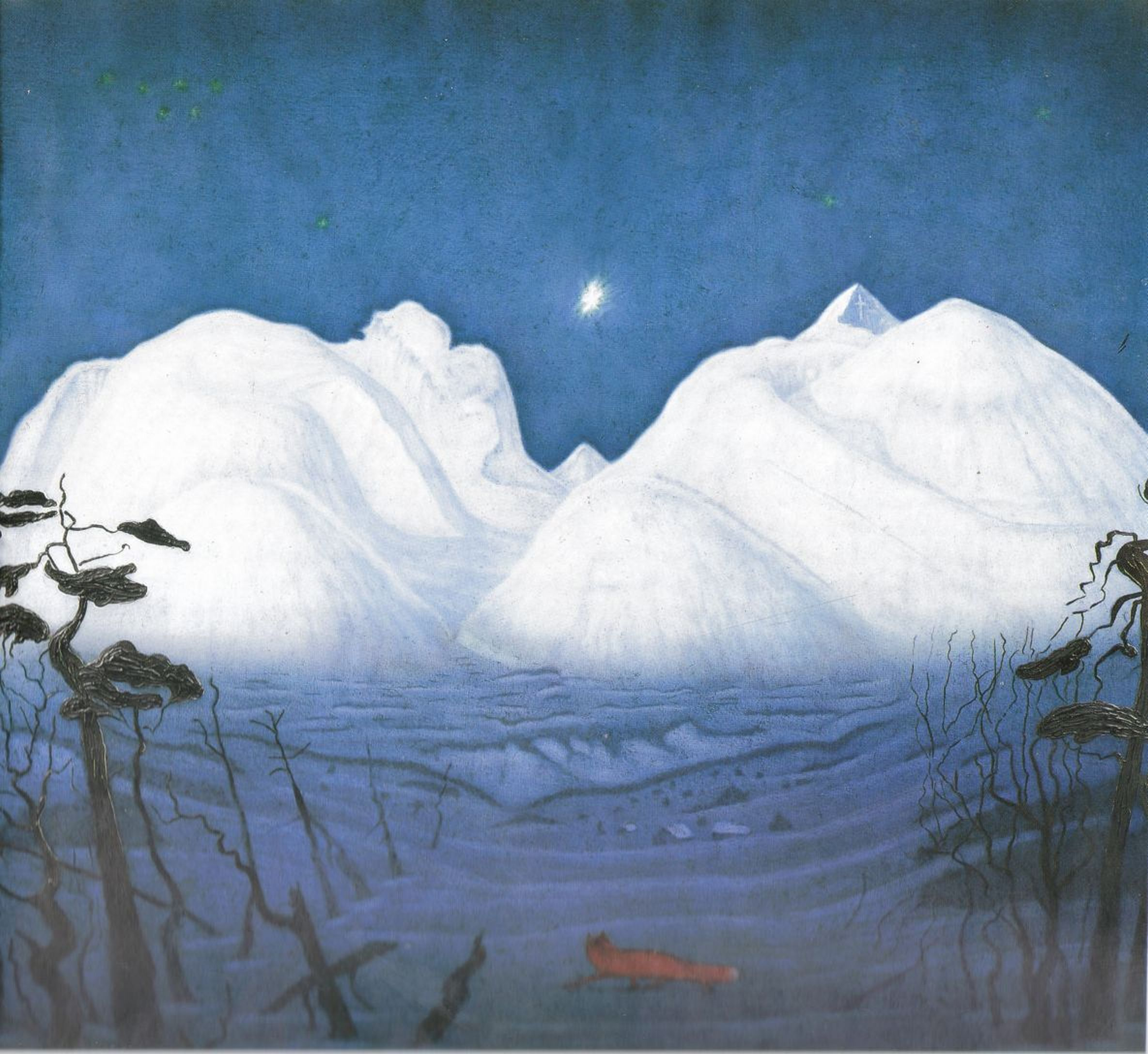
Vinternatt i Rondane III, between 1918 and 1924

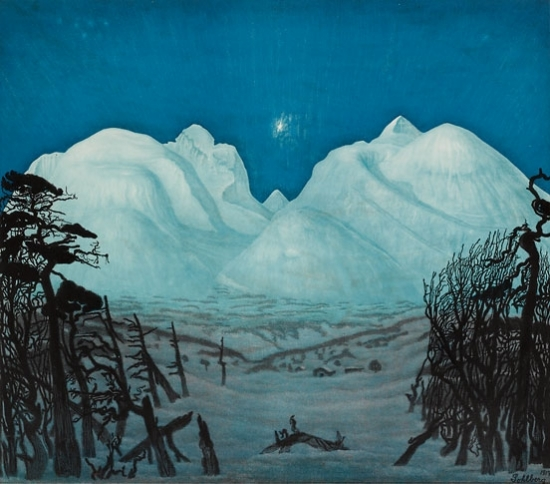
chromolithograph, 1917?
