= Osmo Valtonen =

Finnish artist

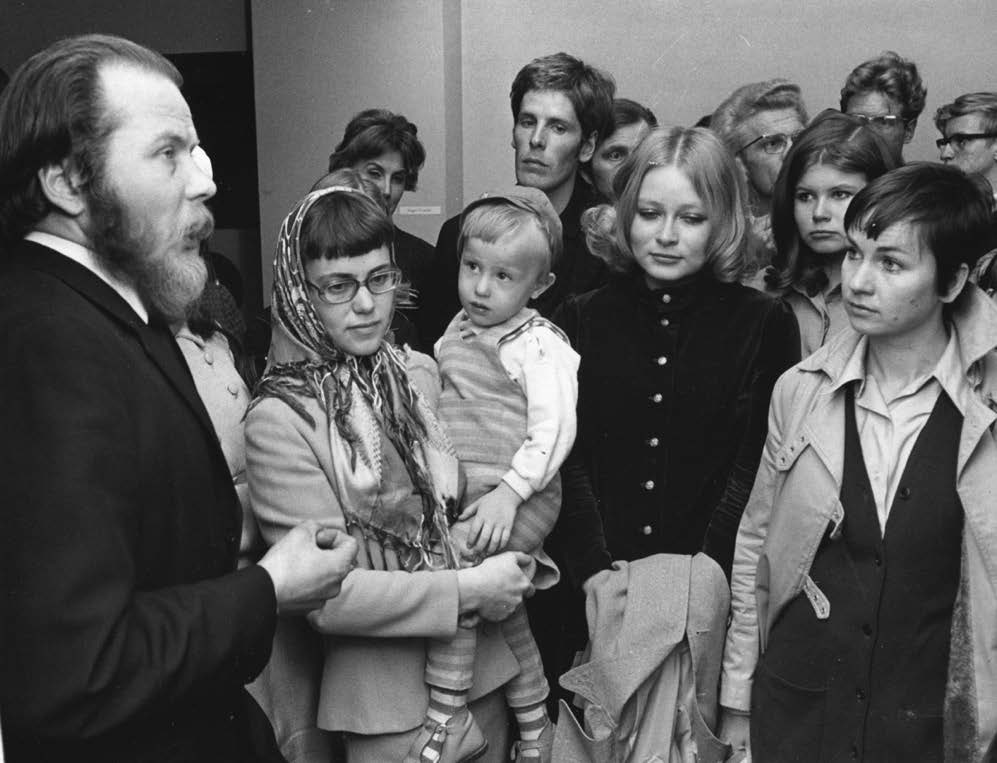
Osmo Valtonen (to the left) in 1969.

Osmo Kalervo Valtonen (30 January 1929 – 3 May 2002) was an artist from Finland. He was a pioneer of kinetic art in Finland. His most popular works were machines which drew shapes in sand.

Valtonen was one of the founders of Dimensio group in 1972, and chair of the group 1976–1979. The group consisted of artists, engineers, composers and scientists. They developed and exhibited "engineering esthetics".

Many of Valtonen's works are based on simple geometric forms. His machines move slowly creating shapes and pictures in sand, reminding of Japanese rock gardens or the plough marks on farm fields.

Valtonen received the Swedish Prince Eugen Medal in 1998.
