= Finn Nygaard =

Danish graphic designer (born 1955)

Finn Nygaard (born 1955) is a graphic designer from Denmark. He has worked professionally in many fields of graphical design, including corporate identity, colour setting, posters, graphic art, layout, and photography. He has exhibited in major galleries and museums around the world and his productions has won him many awards and professional recognition internationally. Nygaard is member of Alliance Graphique Internationale (AGI) since 1997 and a Graphis Master of Design from 2011.

Finn Nygaard lives and works on the island of Mors in the Limfjord area of Northern Jutland.

== Background ==
Nygaard was born in Aarhus and began serious studies of drawing at the Aarhus Art Academy, at the unusually young age of 14, and later Design School Kolding. His talent and enthusiasm secured him an apprenticeship at Borges Grafiske Tegnestue, a design office in Aarhus, from which he graduated in 1977. He established his own studio in 1979 and has worked professionally with graphic design ever since. In the early 1990s he was part of the design group Eleven Danes and the European Designers Network (EDEN). He is a prolific designer, especially with poster art, and has won many acclaimed awards both in Denmark and internationally. In 1997, he became a member of the Alliance Graphique Internationale (AGI).

Nygaard has a personal interest in jazz music and he has designed posters for the Aarhus International Jazz Festival specifically for many years, but also several other major jazz events in Denmark. Many of these jazz posters have won him international awards. Among his travels he has studied calligraphy in Japan, China and Korea and has used the technique artistically for numerous ink art productions.

Nygaard gives lectures and conducts workshops around the world on a regular basis and has exhibited in many prestigious galleries, often solo exhibitions. This includes the IdcN in Nagoya, the Seoul Calligraphy Art Museum, Stedelijk Museum in Amsterdam, State Russian Museum in St. Petersburg, National Museum Poznan in Poland, Pálffy Palace of the Bratislava City Gallery in Slovakia, Museum of Printing History in Houston Texas, and Galleria Maristara in Mexico. Nygaard is on permanent exhibit at the Danish Museum of Art and Design in Copenhagen, Musée des Arts Décoratifs in Paris and The Merrill C. Berman Collection in New York among others. He follows and participates in several prestigious poster biennales.

== Awards and recognitions ==
Some of Nygaards awards and recognitions includes:

- 7 Silver awards in the Graphis Poster Annual 2018 competitions.
- Featured in the International Poster Collection at Colorado State University from 2011.
- Several working grants from The Danish Arts Foundation
- ILMC Worldwide Award for Outside Posters 2001 and 2002 for his jazz posters
- Danish Design Award, 2000
