= Kolding School of Design =

Design school in Kolding, Denmark

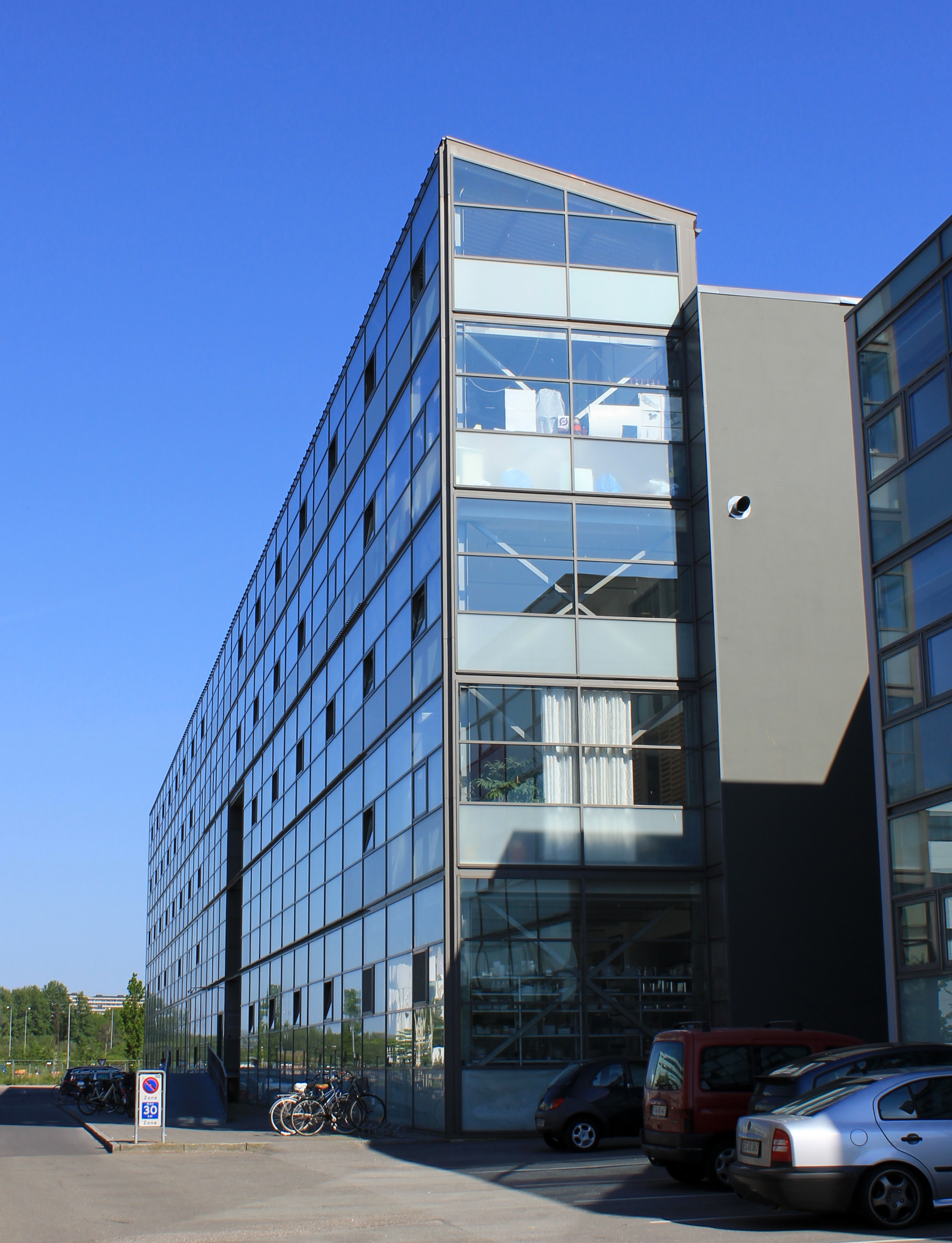
- Established: 1967; 59 years ago
- Location: Kolding, Denmark; 55.4863°N 9.4803°E
- Website: www.designskolenkolding.dk

Kolding School of Design (Danish: Designskolen Kolding) is a design school located in Kolding, Denmark. It delivers undergraduate and postgraduate degrees in the areas of fashion, textiles, communication design, industrial design, accessory design, and design for people, design for planet and design for play (people, planet and play are offered only as part of the MA programme). It was founded in 1967, and received university status in 2010.

== History ==
Kolding School of Design was founded in 1967 as Kolding School of Arts & Crafts with a focus on textile and advertising design. The school expanded into further subjects over the years. In 2010, the school was awarded university status as a design and research institution. It is part of Cumulus (International Association of Universities and Colleges of Art, Design and Media). The school was listed by Domus Magazine as among the 50 best European design schools in 2014-2017. It is among the global design schools that participate in H&M Design Award.

== Programmes ==
The school offers undergraduate and postgraduate degrees, including PhD programmes in the areas of fashion, textiles, accessory design, communication design, industrial design and design for people, design for planet, design for play (people, planet and play are offered only as part of the MA programme). It also offers an MA in design management in conjunction with University of Southern Denmark.

== Notable alumni ==
- Finn Nygaard (b. 1955), graphic designer
- Louise Hindsgavl (b. 1973), sculptor
- Anders Morgenthaler (b. 1972), comics artist, author, animator, film director
