= Lars Englund =

Swedish sculptor and painter (1933–2025)

Englund

Lars Englund (6 May 1933 – 8 July 2025) was a Swedish sculptor and painter who was active from 1953.

== Life and career ==
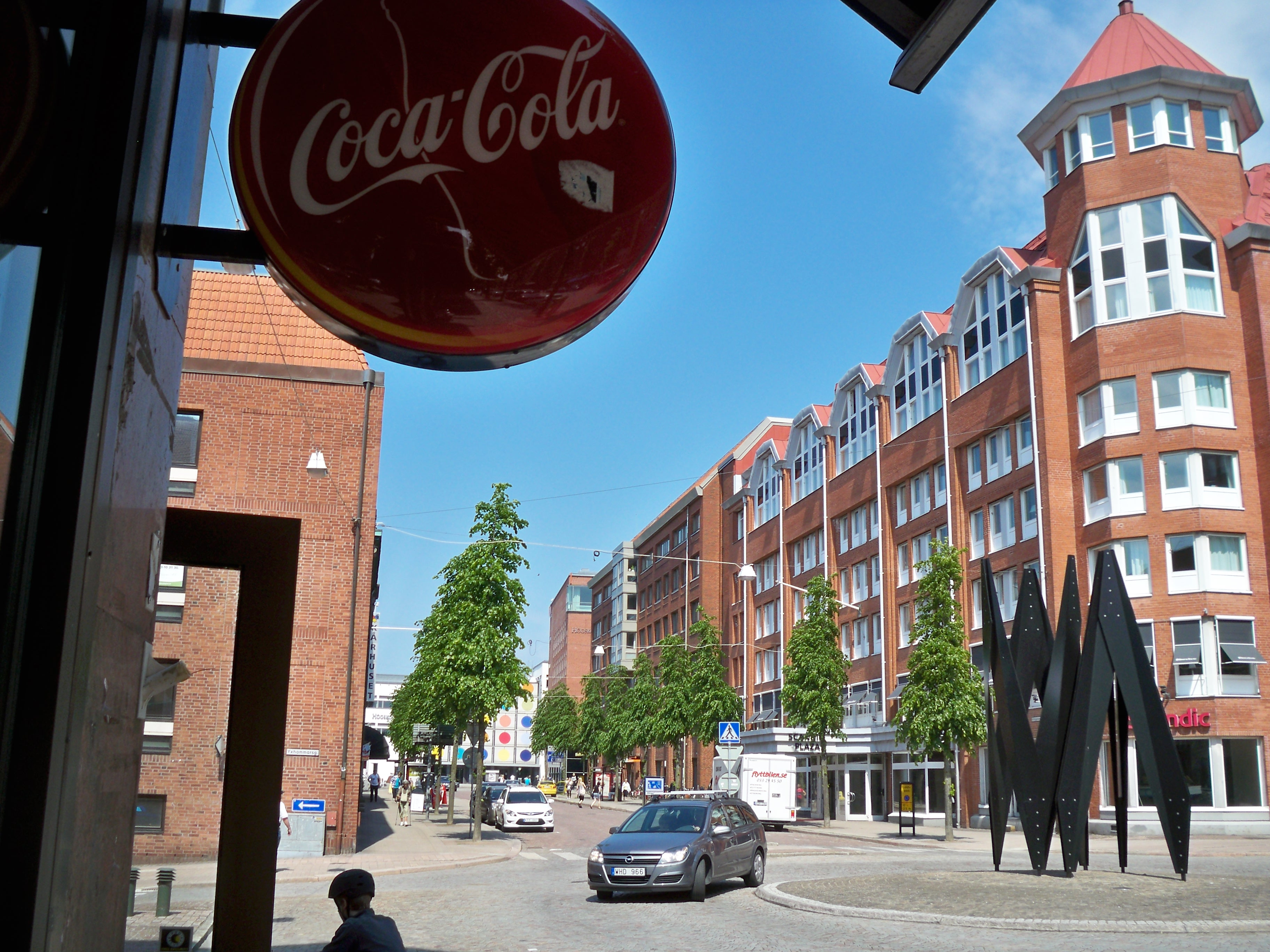
Englund's sculpture Stabil (Stable) in a street crossing in Borås, Sweden (2010)

Englund was born in Stockholm on 6 May 1933.

He was awarded the Prince Eugen Medal for sculpture in 1993.

His piece Stabil (stable) was displayed at Amphoe Takua Pa in memorial to the tsunami victims.

Englund died on 8 July 2025, at the age of 92.
