= Prince Eugen Medal =

Prince Eugen Medal Prins Eugen-medaljen
- Type: Royal medal
- Country: Sweden
- Presented by: The King of Sweden
- Established: 1945

Order of Wear
- Next (higher): Litteris et Artibus
- Next (lower): Prince Carl Medal

The Prince Eugen Medal (Swedish: Prins Eugen-medaljen) is a medal conferred by the King of Sweden for "outstanding artistic achievement".

The medal was established in 1945 by the then King of Sweden, Gustaf V, in connection with the eightieth birthday of his brother Prince Eugen who was a noted painter and art collector.

It is awarded every year on 5 November, the name day of Eugen, and presented to the winners at the Royal Palace in Stockholm.

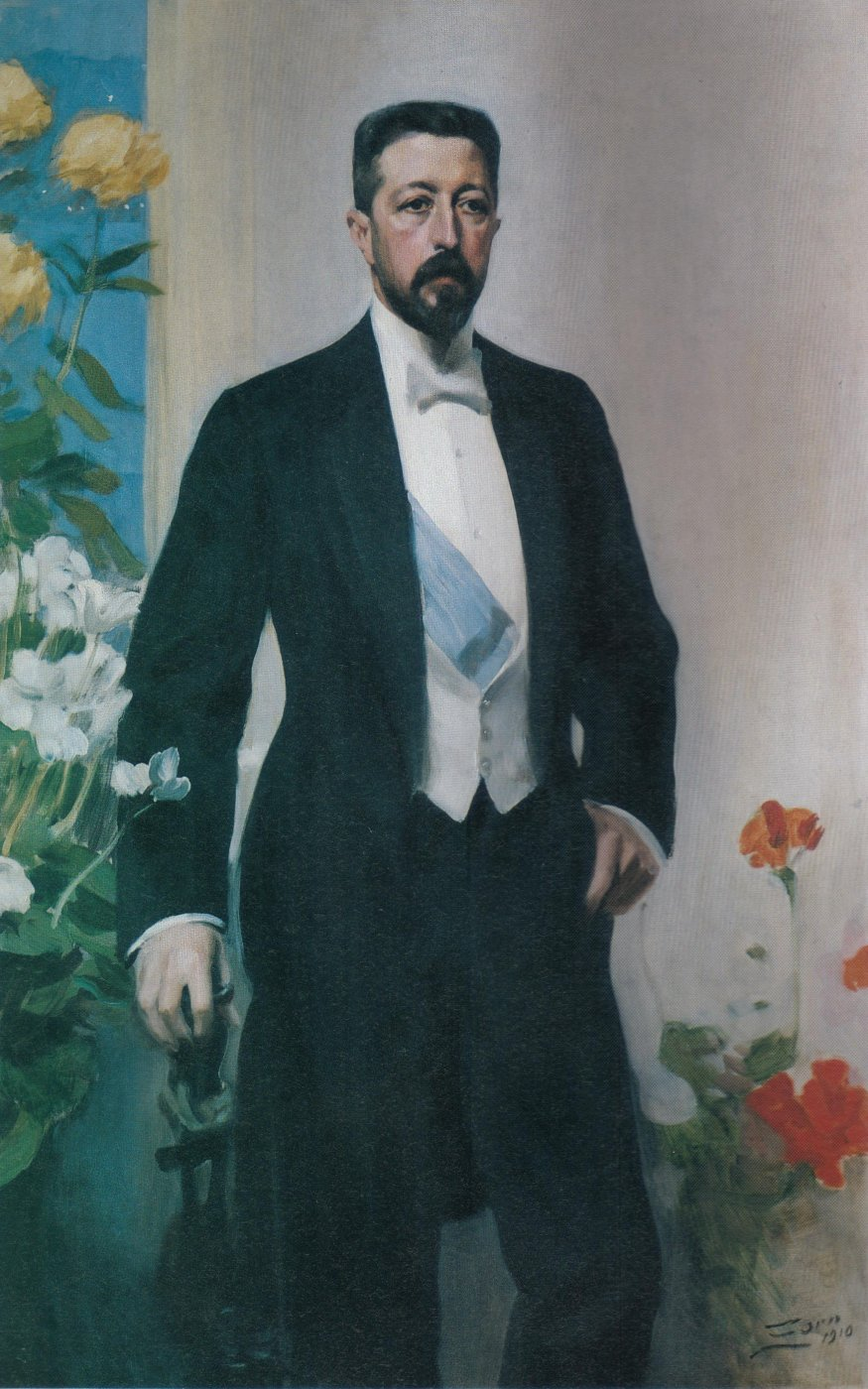
Prince Eugen

== Medallists ==
The following people have received the Prince Eugen Medal since its inception. Winners are Swedish unless denoted otherwise.

=== Architects ===
- 1945 Nils Eriksson, Erik Lallerstedt, Ivar Tengbom
- 1947 Lars Israel Wahlman
- 1950 Sigurd Lewerentz
- 1951 Artur von Schmalensee
- 1954 Paul Hedqvist, Alvar Aalto (Finland)
- 1956 Sven Ivar Lind
- 1957 Hakon Ahlberg
- 1958 Kay Fisker (Denmark)
- 1959 Melchior Wernstedt
- 1960 Arnstein Arneberg (Norway)
- 1961 Sven Markelius
- 1962 Arne Jacobsen (Denmark)
- 1963 Viljo Revell (Finland)
- 1964 Erik Ahlsén
- 1968 Erik Lundberg
- 1970 Sven Backström, Leif Reinius
- 1972 Nils Tesch, C.Th. Sørensen (Denmark)
- 1973 Jørn Utzon (Denmark)
- 1975 Kjell Lund (Norway)
- 1976 Carl Nyrén
- 1978 Klas Anshelm
- 1980 Tore Ahlsén
- 1981 Nils Ahrbom, Reima Pietilä (Finland)
- 1982 Sverre Fehn (Norway)
- 1983 Bengt Lindroos
- 1984 Walter Bauer
- 1986 Jan Wallinder, Henning Larsen (Denmark)
- 1988 Jan Gezelius, Sven Ingvar Andersson (Denmark)
- 1990 Bengt Hidemark
- 1991 Erik Asmussen (Denmark)
- 1992 Per Friberg
- 1993 Åke Axelsson (furniture)
- 1994 Gunnar Mattson, Juha Leiviskä (Finland)
- 1996 Ove Hidemark
- 1998 Gustaf Rosenberg
- 2000 Johan Celsing
- 2002 Ralph Erskine
- 2003 Lèonie Geisendorf
- 2005 Gert Wingårdh
- 2004 Kristian Gullichsen (Finland)
- 2006 Jan Olav Jensen (Norway)
- 2007 Knud Holscher (Denmark)
- 2009 Mats Edblom, Louise Campbell (Denmark)
- 2010 Hans Bäckström
- 2011 Jan Gehl
- 2012 Erik Wikerstål
- 2013 Bo Swenson, Kjetil Trædal Thorsen (Norway)
- 2014 Jonas Bohlin, Lene Tranberg (Denmark)
- 2016 Pye Aurell Ehrström, Katarina Grundsell, Louise Masreliez, Susanne Ramel
- 2017 Rainer Mahlamäki (Finland)
- 2018 Margrét Harðardóttir (Iceland)

=== Painters ===
- 1945 Olle Hjortzberg, Isaac Grünewald, Hilding Linnqvist
- 1946 Sven Erixon, Otte Sköld
- 1947 Jens Ferdinand Willumsen (Denmark), Henrik Sørensen (Norway)
- 1948 Vera Nilsson, Per Krogh (Norway)
- 1949 Fritiof Schüldt
- 1950 Axel Nilsson
- 1951 Alf Rolfsen (Norway)
- 1954 Hugo Zuhr
- 1955 Axel Revold (Norway)
- 1957 Einar Jolin, Oluf Höst (Denmark), Marcus Collin (Finland)
- 1958 Ragnar Sandberg, Johannes Kjarval (Iceland)
- 1960 Siri Derkert, Sixten Lundbohm
- 1961 Evert Lundquist, Tor Bjurström
- 1963 Einar Forseth
- 1964 Inge Schiöler, Reidar Aulie (Norway)
- 1965 Max Walter Svanberg
- 1967 Lennart Rodhe, Richard Mortensen (Denmark)
- 1969 Torsten Renqvist
- 1971 Erik Olson, Henry Heerup (Denmark)
- 1973 Stellan Mörner, Alf Lindberg
- 1974 Olle Nyman
- 1975 Lage Lindell
- 1976 Nisse Zetterberg, Svend Wiig Hansen (Denmark)
- 1977 Lennart Gram
- 1978 Sigrid Schauman (Finland), Arne Ekeland (Norway)
- 1979 Sören Hjort Nielsen (Danish), Gudmundur ”Erro” Gudmundsson (Iceland)
- 1980 Endre Nemes, Carl-Henning Pedersen (Denmark)
- 1981 Rune Jansson
- 1982 Karl Axel Pehrson
- 1983 Philip von Schantz, Harald Leth (Denmark), Lars-Gunnar Nordström (Finland), Inger Sitter (Norway)
- 1984 Egill Jacobsen (Denmark)
- 1985 Birgit Broms
- 1986 Carl Fredrik Reuterswärd
- 1987 Curt Asker, Ejler Bille (Denmark)
- 1989 Ingegerd Möller, Paul Osipow (Finland)
- 1990 Per Kirkeby (Denmark)
- 1991 Hertha Hillfon, Lenke Rothman, Ulrik Samuelson, Jan Groth (Norway)
- 1992 Pierre Olofson, Richard Winther (Denmark)
- 1993 Olle Bonniér, Jens Johannessen (Norway), Kristján Gudmundsson (Iceland)
- 1994 Lena Cronqvist
- 1995 Torsten Andersson
- 1996 Ulf Trotzig
- 1997 Ola Billgren, Olav Christopher Jenssen (Norway)
- 1998 Tommy Östmar, Magnús Pálsson (Iceland)
- 1999 Tom Krestesen
- 2000 Harald Lyth, Leonard Rickhard (Norway)
- 2001 Laris Strunke
- 2002 Olle Kåks
- 2002 Carl Otto Hultén
- 2004 Hans Wigert, Hreinn Fridfinnsson (Iceland)
- 2005 Åke Pallarp, A K Dolven (Norway)
- 2006 Nils Kölare, Gunvor Nelson
- 2007 Jan Håfström, Marie-Louise Ekman
- 2008 Dan Wolgers, Eija-Liisa Ahtila (Finland)
- 2009 Karin Mamma Andersson, Nina Roos (Finland)
- 2010 Claes Bäckström, May Bente Aronsen (Norway), Matti Kujasalo (Finland)
- 2011 Hrafnhildur Arnardóttir (Iceland)
- 2012 Kjell Anderson
- 2013 Elisabet Oscarsson
- 2014 Kent Lindfors, Pasi Välimaa (Finland)
- 2015 Mårten Andersson, Håkan Rehnberg
- 2016 Ann Edholm
- 2017 John-Erik Franzén, Jockum Nordström
- 2018 Jarl Ingvarsson

=== Graphic Artists ===
- 1947 Harald Sallberg
- 1955 Stig Åsberg
- 1956 Emil Johanson-Thor
- 1959 Stig Borglind
- 1963 Palle Nielsen (Denmark)
- 1967 Börje Veslen
- 1971 Torsten Billman
- 1973 Rolf Nesch (Norway)
- 1974 Pentti Kaskipuro (Finland)
- 1976 Sven Ljungberg
- 1979 Gunnar Norrman
- 1983 Sixten Haage
- 1984 Ernst Mether-Borgström (Finland)
- 1986 Bertil Lundberg
- 1988 Nils G. Stenqvist
- 1996 Outi Heiskanen (Finland)
- 1997 Lasse Söderberg
- 2003 Ulla Fries
- 2015 Hans Cogne

=== Sculptors ===
- 1945 Carl Eldh, Eric Grate, Carl Milles
- 1946 Ivar Johnsson
- 1947 Wäinö Aaltonen (Finland), Einar Jonson (Iceland)
- 1948 Erik Lindberg
- 1949 Bror Hjorth
- 1951 John Lundqvist
- 1955 Gerhard Henning (Denmark)
- 1956 Stig Blomberg
- 1958 Robert Nilsson
- 1959 Gunnar Nilsson
- 1960 Adam Fischer (Denmark)
- 1962 Bror Marklund
- 1966 Christian Berg
- 1967 Kain Tapper (Finland)
- 1968 Arne Jones
- 1969 Gustaf Nordahl
- 1970 Arnold Haukeland (Norway)
- 1973 Asmund Arle
- 1974 Robert J. Jakobsen (Denmark)
- 1975 Liss Eriksson
- 1977 Ivar Lindekrantz
- 1979 Edvin Öhrström
- 1981 Elis Eriksson
- 1982 Palle Pernevi, Erik Thommesen (Denmark)
- 1985 Karl Göte Bejemark, Sigurdur Gudmundsson (Iceland)
- 1987 Harry Kivijärvi (Finland)
- 1989 Sivert Lindblom, Rúrí (Iceland)
- 1990 Einar Höste
- 1992 Mauno Hartman (Finland)
- 1993 Lars Englund
- 1994 Bjørn Nørgaard (Denmark)
- 1995 Bård Breivik (Norway)
- 1996 Lars Kleen
- 1998 Osmo Valtonen (Finland)
- 1999 Gert Marcus
- 2001 Eva Lange
- 2004 Kajsa Mattas
- 2005 Olafur Eliasson (Denmark)
- 2007 Leif Bolter
- 2009 Lars Olof Loeld
- 2011 Rune Rydelius
- 2012 Charlotte Gyllenhammar, Per Inge Bjørlo (Norway)
- 2013 Martti Aiha (Finland)
- 2014 Eva Löfdahl
- 2015 Berit Lindfeldt, Håkan Rehnberg
- 2017 Eva Hild, Siri Aurdal (Norway)

=== Artisans ===
- 1945 Edvard Hald, Carl Malmsten
- 1947 Erik Fleming
- 1949 Wilhelm Kåge
- 1951 Nathalie Krebs (Denmark)
- 1954 Barbro Nilsson
- 1957 Arthur Percy
- 1958 Wiwen Nilsson
- 1959 Axel Salto (Denmark), Hannah Ryggen (Norway)
- 1960 Alf Munthe
- 1961 Hans Wegner (Denmark), Dora Jung (Finland)
- 1964 Sven Arne Gillgren, Kai Frank (Denmark)
- 1965 Bruno Mathsson
- 1968 Stig Lindberg
- 1970 Sigurd Persson
- 1971 Edna Martin
- 1971 Viola Gråsten
- 1977 Sven Palmqvist
- 1979 Ulla Schumacher-Percy
- 1979 Berndt Friberg
- 1980 Kaisa Melanton, Tapio Wirkkala (Finland)
- 1981 Gertrud Vasegaard (Denmark)
- 1982 Karin Björquist, Birger Kaipiainen (Finland)
- 1984 Birger Haglund
- 1985 Elisabeth Hasselberg-Olsson, Benny Motzfeldt (Norway)
- 1986 Vuokko Eskolin-Nurmesniemi (Finland)
- 1987 Gösta Engström
- 1988 Gunnar Cyrén, Tone Vigeland (Norway)
- 1990 Ingrid Dessau, Synnøve Anker Aurdal (Norway)
- 1991 Bertel Gardberg (Finland)
- 1992 Torun Vivianna Bülow-Hübe
- 1994 Bengt Liljedahl
- 1995 Bertil Vallien, Alev Siesbye (Denmark), Kirsti Rantanen (Finland)
- 1996 Vibeke Klint (Denmark)
- 1997 Sigvard Bernadotte, Jane Reumert (Denmark)
- 1998 Ingegerd Råman
- 1999 Helena Hernmarck
- 2000 Sten Kauppi, Gutte Eriksen (Denmark)
- 2001 Signe Persson-Melin, Oiva Toikka (Finland)
- 2002 Hans Krondahl, Ursula Munch-Petersen (Denmark)
- 2003 Liv Blåvarp (Norway)
- 2004 Kerstin Öhlin Lejonklou
- 2005 Olle Ohlsson
- 2006 Kenneth Williamsson, Jacob Jensen (Denmark)
- 2008 Grete Prytz Kittelsen
- 2010 Erika Lagerbielke
- 2011 Helena Edman (goldsmith)
- 2012 Janna Syvänoja (Finland)
- 2013 Annika Ekdahl
- 2015 Louise Hindsgavl (Denmark), Sigurd Bronger (Norway)
- 2016 Anne Tophøj (Denmark)

=== Photographers ===
- 1974 Lennart Nilsson
- 2008 Hans Hammarskiöld
- 2011 Gunnar Smoliansky
- 2024 Gerry Johansson

=== Draftsmen ===
- 1972 Ann Margret Dahlquist-Ljungberg
- 1978 Gunnar Hasselgren
- 1984 Cecilia Frisendahl
- 1989 Stig Claesson
- 1995 Roj Friberg

=== Designers ===
- 2017 Eero Aarnio (Finland)
- 2018 Mats Theselius

== See also ==
- Orders, decorations, and medals of Sweden
- List of European art awards
- Prizes named after people
