= Lars-Gunnar Nordström =

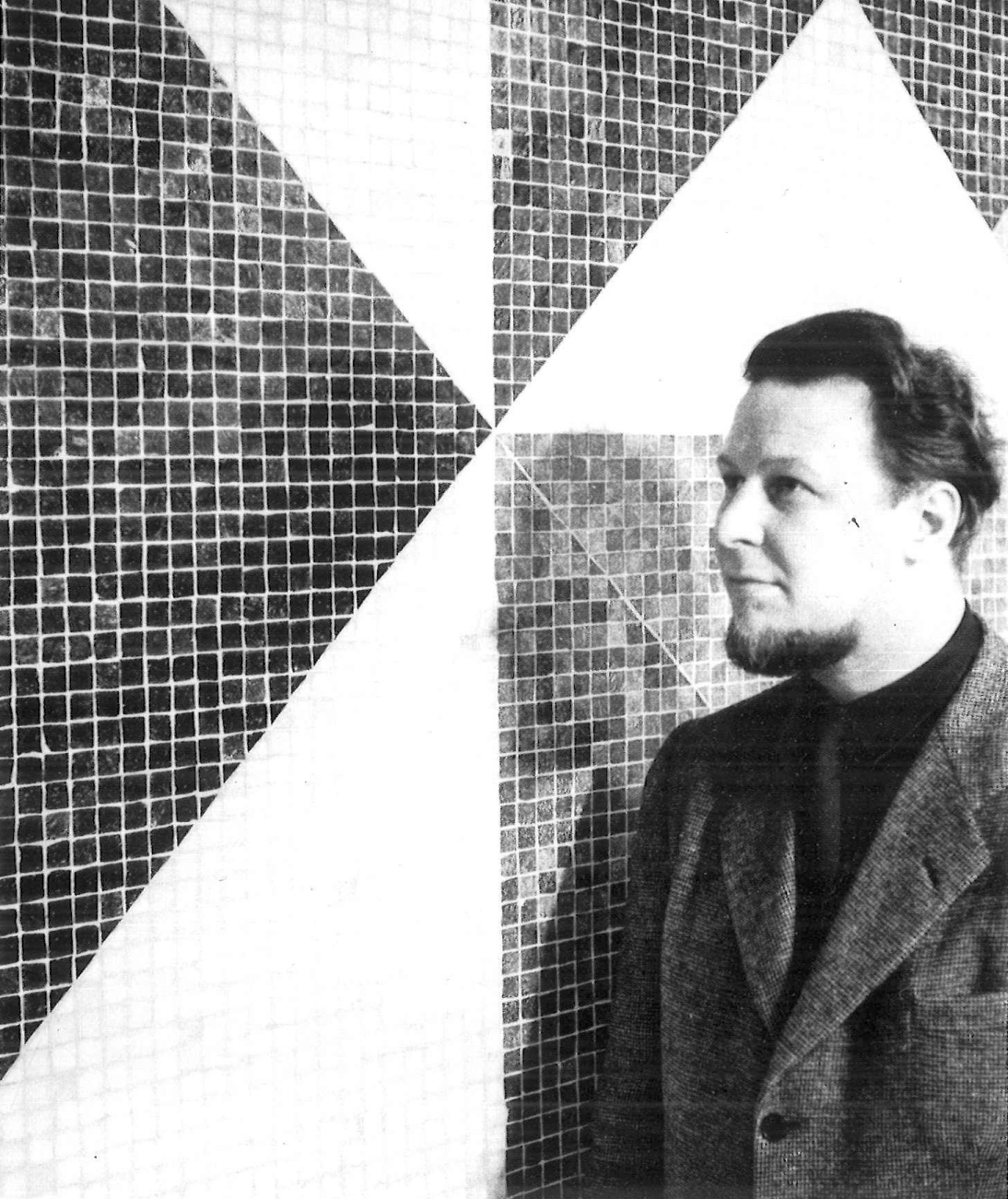
Nordström in 1958

Lars-Gunnar Nordström (19 August 1924, in Helsinki – 10 August 2014, in Helsinki) was a Finnish artist, one of the leading pioneers of non-representational art in Finland. His genre of art, concretism, is characterized by an extremely precise, finished, deliberate visual expression. Nordström is particularly known for his geometric paintings, in which angular and curved flat colour fields form clear, strong, dynamic compositions. His oeuvre consists mainly of graphic prints, paintings and sculptures.

== Biography ==
Nordström was born into a family of architects. He initially aimed to study engineering at the Helsinki University of Technology, but did not pass the entrance exams and ended up studying interior design at the Central School of Art and Design between 1946 and 1949. He also attended the Free Art School and made study trips to Paris and New York. He worked as a designer of furniture at various architects' offices until 1960.

He debuted with a solo exhibition in 1949 in Helsinki. This was the first non-representational art exhibition in Finland, and the audience was confused. His later exhibitions received a mixed reception. Only his large exhibition on 1970 in Amos Anderson Art Museum was widely appreciated. After that he was very productive and was honoured with various awards, including nomination to Artist of the Year in 1983.

He received the Swedish Prince Eugen Medal in 1983.

Nordström's works Sculptural (1952) and Red Composition (1954) are displayed at the Ateneum in Helsinki.
