= Åke Axelsson =

Swedish designer and interior decorator (1932–2026)

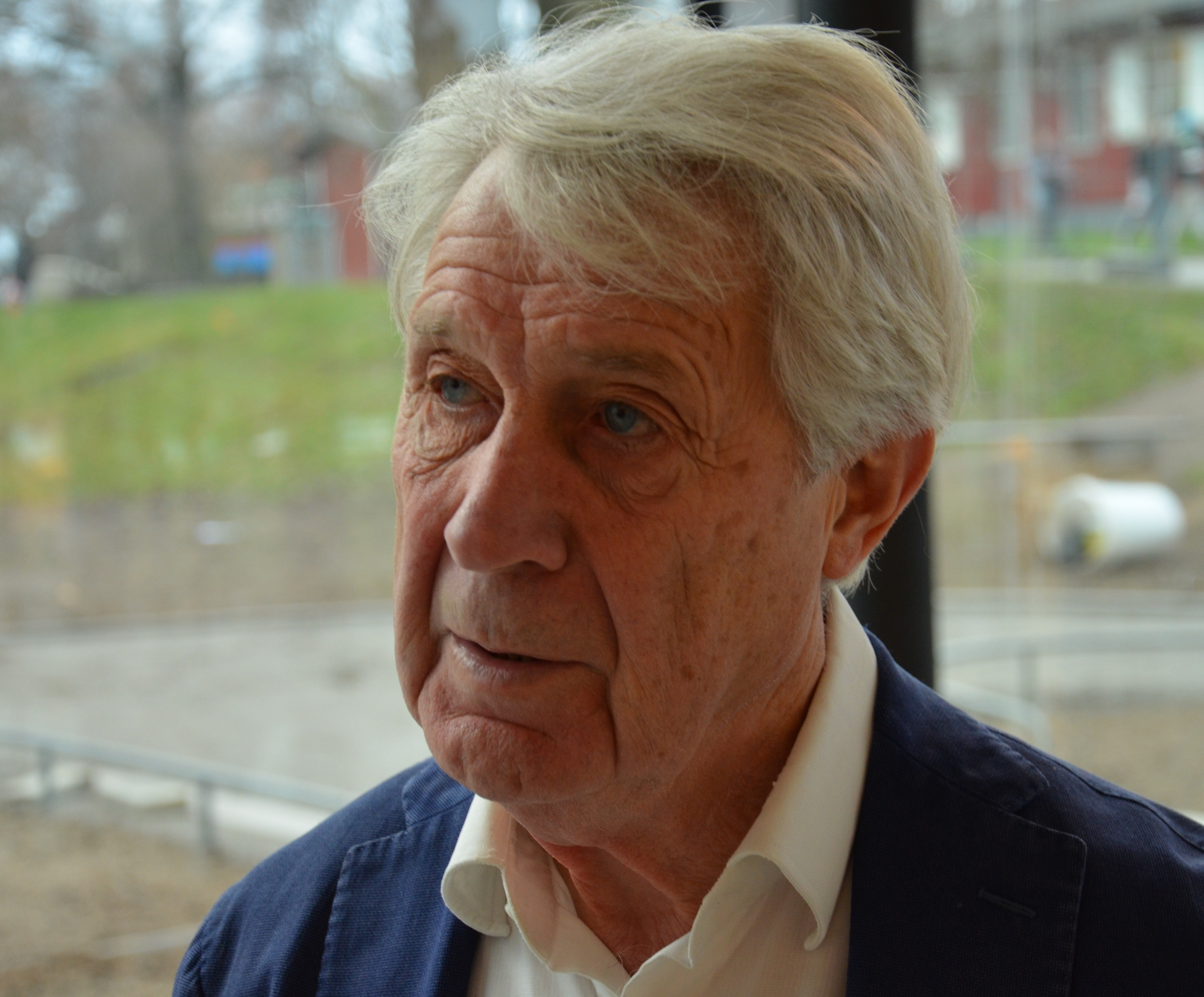
Axelsson in 2011

Åke Axelsson (25 February 1932 – 7 May 2026) was a Swedish designer and interior decorator.

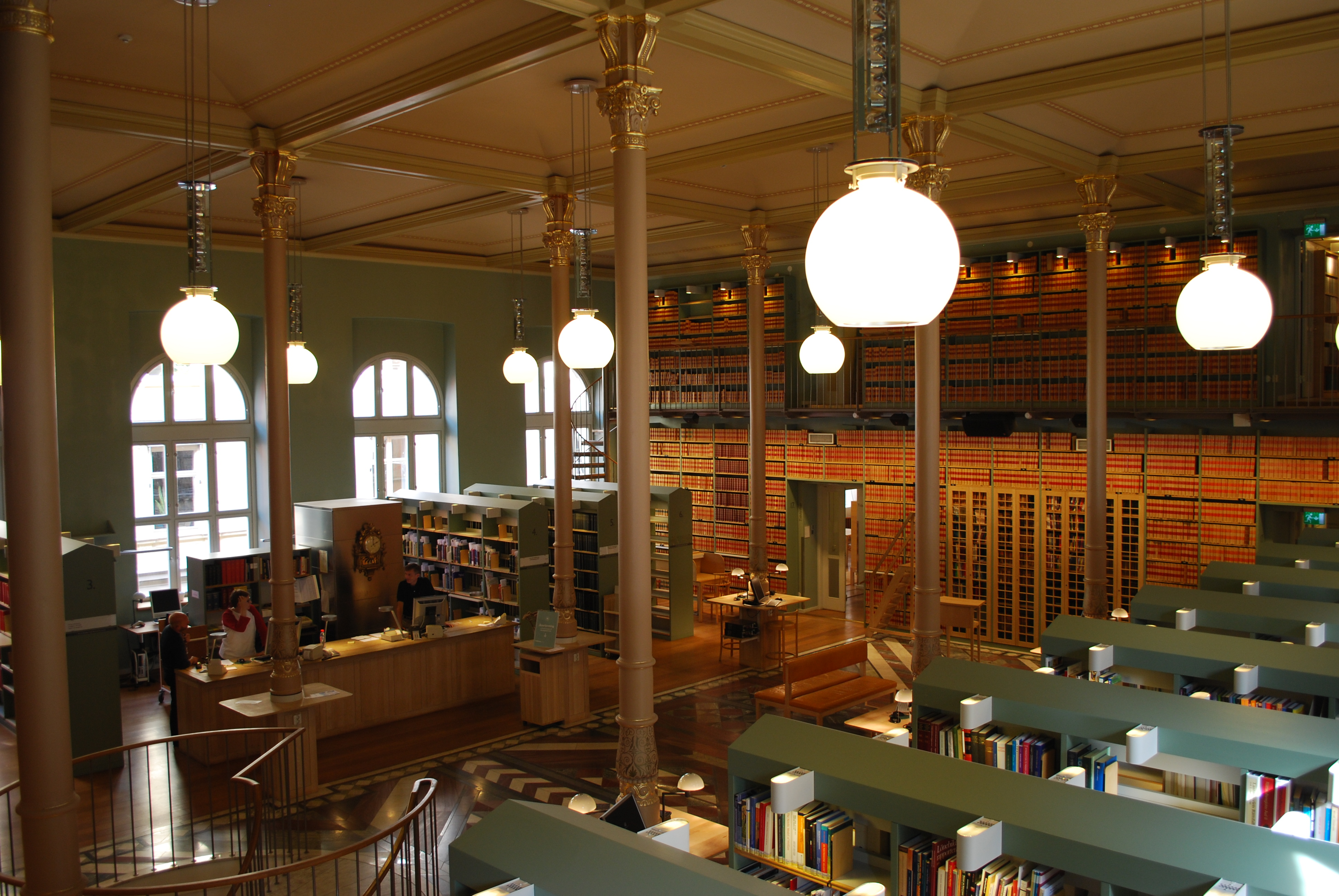
The library of the Swedish Parliament, with furniture and interiors designed by Axelsson

== Life and career ==
Axelsson was born in Urshult on 25 February 1932. His skill in woodworking was noticed early and he initially studied furniture making in Visby. After an internship at a furniture factory in Munich, he studied interior decoration at Konstfack in Stockholm. He was employed by architectural firms 1957–1961, including that of Peter Celsing 1959–1961, before starting an interior design firm, initially with a partner in 1961 and from 1967 on his own.

He received many both private and public commissions to design furniture and interiors. For example, he designed interiors for the library of the Swedish Parliament, the Swedish Institute in Rome, Värmlands Museum, Stockholm School of Economics, Carlskrona Läsesällskaps Bibliotek, a room in the Royal Palace and the historic restaurant Den gyldene freden.

Axelsson became a member of the Royal Swedish Academy of Fine Arts in 1989, was awarded the Prince Eugen Medal in 1994 and the Bruno Mathsson Prize in 1995.

Axelsson died on 7 May 2026, at the age of 94.
