= Viola Gråsten =

Finnish textile artist and designer (1910–1994)

- Viola Gråsten (1950), photograph by Erik Holmén
- Born: Viola Hildegard Forsberg; 18 November 1910; Keuruu, Finland
- Died: 20 October 1994 (aged 83)
- Other names: Viola Gråsten-Öhquist
- Citizenship: Finland; Sweden
- Known for: Textile design
- Spouse: Nils Robert Waldemar Öhquist
- Awards: Prince Eugen Medal (1973)

Viola Hildegard Gråsten (born Forsberg; 18 November 1910 – 20 October 1994) was a Swedish textile designer.

Gråsten was born in Keuruu in Häme, Finland and was brought up as a foster daughter by the Finnish Finance Minister, Ernst Gråsten. She studied for four years at the Central School of Crafts in Helsinki until 1936, after which she worked as a designer at the Friends of Finnish Handicraft. In 1944, because of wartime yarn shortages in Finland, she moved to Sweden and designed shaggy rugs for Textiles & Interiors in Stockholm. A year later she took a post at the NK Textile Studio, where she began to design patterns for textiles and made a reputation for her colourful geometric designs. In 1950, she received Swedish citizenship. In 1956 she became artistic director of fashion textiles at Mölnlycke Weavers, where she stayed until her retirement in 1973.

Gråsten was awarded the Prince Eugen Medal for design in 1973.

== Gallery ==
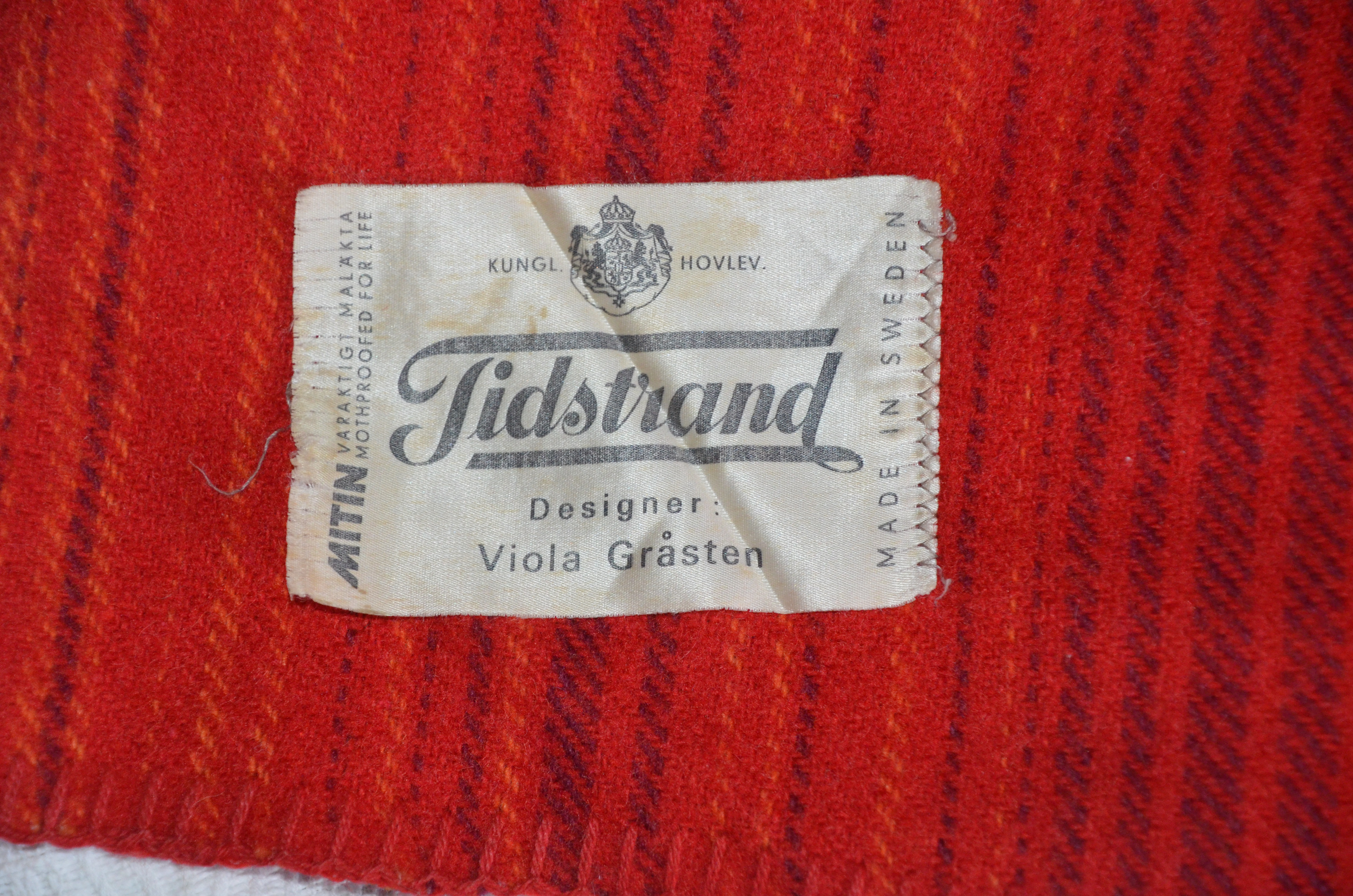
A blanket from Tidstrand's Wool Factories designed by Viola Gråsten.

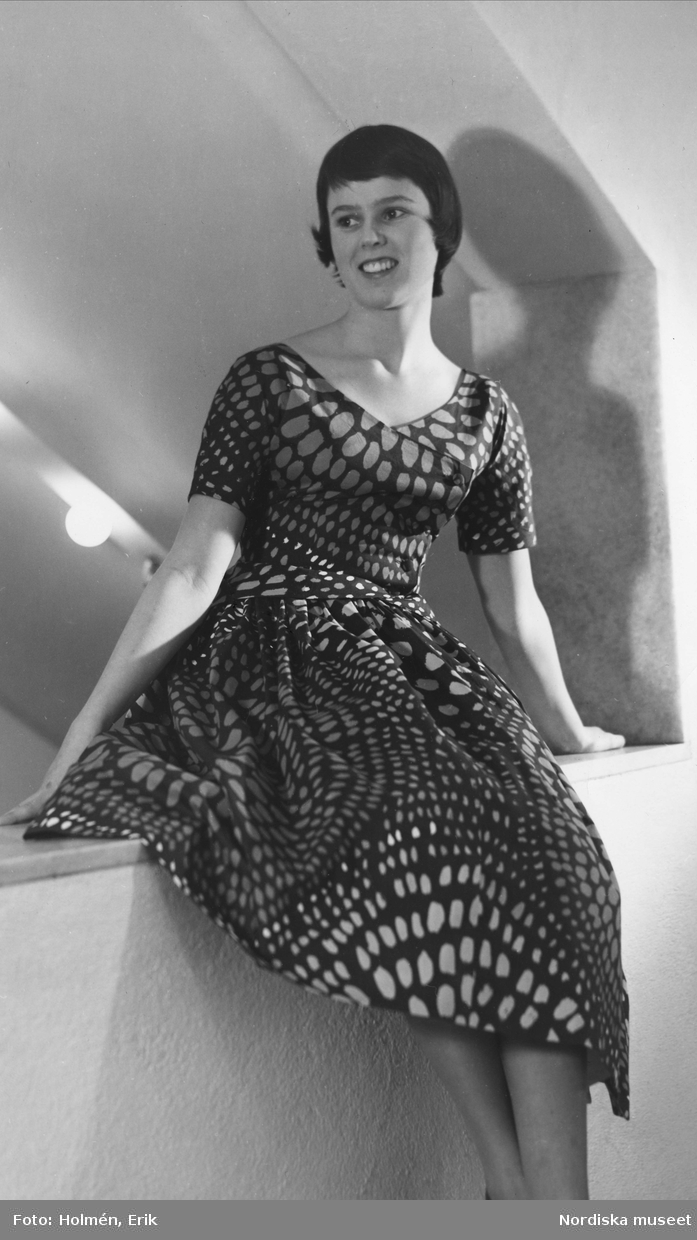
Viola Gråsten's pattern on a dress from around 1955.
