= Urshult =

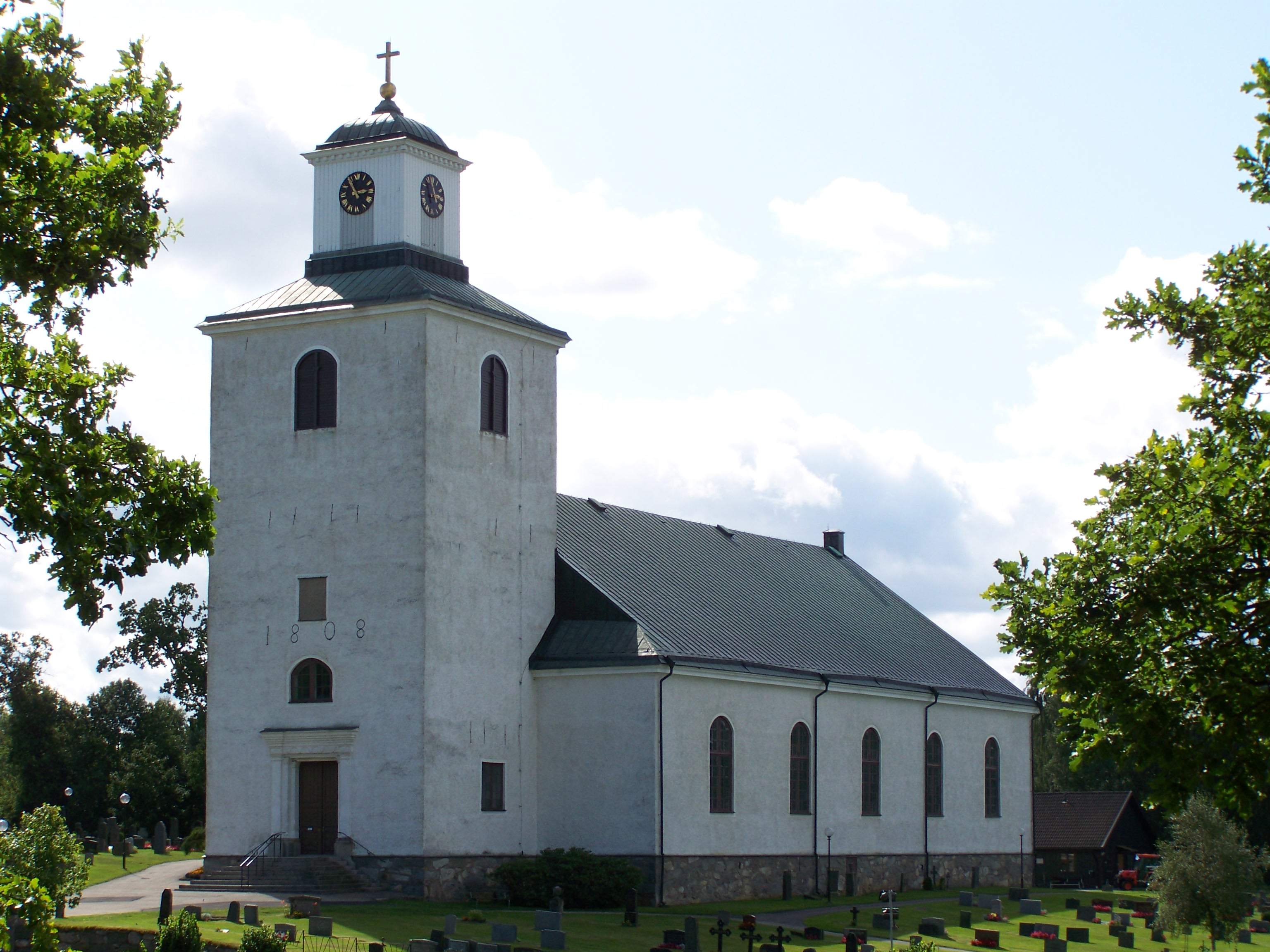
- Urshult Church

- Location within Kronoberg Location within Sweden
- Coordinates: 56°32′N 14°47′E
- Country: Sweden
- Province: Småland
- County: Kronoberg County
- Municipality: Tingsryd Municipality

Area
  - Total: 1.46 km^{2} (0.56 sq mi)

Population (31 December 2010)
  - Total: 794
  - Density: 543/km^{2} (1,410/sq mi)
- Time zone: UTC+1 (CET)
  - Summer (DST): UTC+2 (CEST)

Urshult (Swedish pronunciation: [ˈʉ̌ːʂhɵlt]) is a locality situated in Tingsryd Municipality, Kronoberg County, Sweden with 794 inhabitants in 2010.

A variety of apple, dark red and harvested in December, was named after the village. The village has a church which was built in 1808.

Furniture maker and interior designer Åke Axelsson was born in Urshult.
