= Aarhus Jazz Festival =

Jazz festival in Denmark

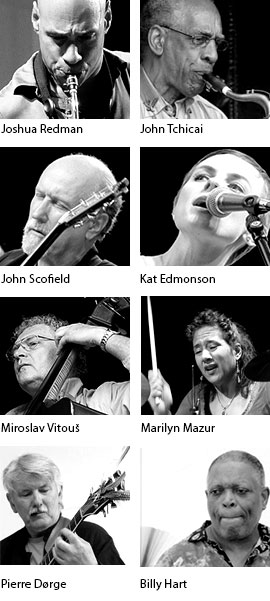
- A selection of artists that have played Aarhus Jazz Festival
- Genre: Jazz, blues, experimental jazz and jazz-influenced rhythmic and electronic music.
- Dates: Eight days in July
- Locations: Århus, Denmark
- Years active: 1989 – present
- Website: Aarhus Jazz Festival

Aarhus Jazz Festival (formerly Aarhus International Jazz Festival) is a ten-day jazz festival in Aarhus, Denmark. It is held every year around the beginning of July. The festival performs in collaboration with the Aarhus Concert Hall, as well as many different venues across the city. Many concerts are played outdoors in the public space and most daytime events are for free.

== History ==
Initiated in 1988 by Musikhuset and local venues, Aarhus Jazz Festival has been an annual summer event in the city since 1989. The festival is bent on featuring new talents in jazz as well as both local and international stars. From the beginning, the festival has featured many notable and world-renowned international jazz stars and bands such as Stan Getz, Dizzy Gillespie, Herbie Hancock, The Zawinul Syndicate, Clark Terry, Mike Stern and John Scofield – some of them several times – in a mix with more local notables such as John Tchicai, Jesper Thilo, Svend Asmussen, Ed Thigpen, Cæcilie Norby, Sinne Eeg, Marilyn Mazur, Pierre Dørge and Alex Riel. The programme is quite broad in its musical choices, often including world renowned blues performers like B. B. King, Bonnie Raitt, John Mayall or Danish blues acts like Kenn Lendings Blues Band, Shades of Blue or The Blue Junction. Alternative musical styles with jazz-influences have been represented by artists such as Nitin Sawhney, Sting, Dr. John, Abdullah Ibrahim and The Roots in a mix with many local, new or unknown names.

The festival has grown considerably in the 2010s; in 2014 it featured 230 concerts at 29 venues, while in 2018, the festival celebrated its 30th anniversary with more than 360 concerts across 42 venues.

From 2014 to 2017 when Aarhus was European Capital of Culture, Aarhus Jazz Festival turned its focus towards European jazz; jazz from Poland in particular, since the city of Wrocław was Capital of Culture in 2016. The 2016 festival took a deliberate focus on the women in jazz, and included international female artists like Melody Gardot, Sarah McKenzie and Lizz Wright and that years poster also featured Hiromi Uehara. Both the 2016 and 2017 festivals were expanded to last 10 days and also included world music concerts in addition to the more rigid jazz programme.

Stan Getz was the first international artist to play at Aarhus Jazz festival in 1989 and as a homage, the 2018 festival played his music at several concerts. The 2019 festival celebrated 100 years of jazz music in Aarhus.

== Posters ==
Graphic designer Finn Nygaard, himself from Aarhus and a lover of jazz music, has created many of the festival posters. He received design awards for these posters in 1990, 1991, 1998, 2000, 2001, and 2002.
