= Erik Thommesen =

Danish sculptor (1916–2008)

Erik Thommesen (15 February 1916 – 22 August 2008) was a Danish sculptor who worked mainly with wood, creating Expressionist representations of the human figure inspired by African sculpture.

== Biography ==
Born in Copenhagen, Thommesen began to draw and paint when he was 20 but soon moved to sculpture. Although he studied zoology for a time at the University of Copenhagen, as an artist he self-taught. Most of his works are wood, a few pieces are stone and even fewer, bronze. They all depict the human form, in his attempt to find the most expressive way in which to represent man and his relationship to his surroundings. In 1962 he described his work as follows: "The portrait, the head, the upright man; man and woman, mother and child — or perhaps rather their body's relationship to the surrounding space."

His figures are crafted in an almost Expressionist style with bowed heads or emaciated bodies. Recognizable features such as arms, legs and face are absent, leaving only the body itself. Notable items from the 1940s include a series based on the theme Pige med fletning (Girl with Braid) culminating in 1948 with a piece in which the body and the braid form a solid pillar. Another subject is the human head which develops into a block-like shape. In 1948, after discovering Astrid Noack's Naturalistic works he tried to give his own sculptures most expressiveness, often looking like blocks or tree-trunks. His work is inspired by African sculpture as well as by the work of Henri Matisse, Pablo Picasso and Aristide Maillol.

Many of Thommesen's works are in the collection of Statens Museum for Kunst.

== Awards ==
In 1965, he was awarded the Eckersberg Medal and in 1972, the Thorvaldsen Medal. He received the Prince Eugen Medal for sculpture from the King of Sweden in 1982.

== Literature ==
- Jürgensen, Andreas (2001). Billedhuggeren Erik Thommesen: The sculptor Erik Thommesen. Holstebro kunstmuseum. ISBN 978-87-89059-44-0.
- Vad, Poul (1964). Erik Thommesen. Munksgaard.
