= Leonard Rickhard =

Norwegian painter (1945–2024)

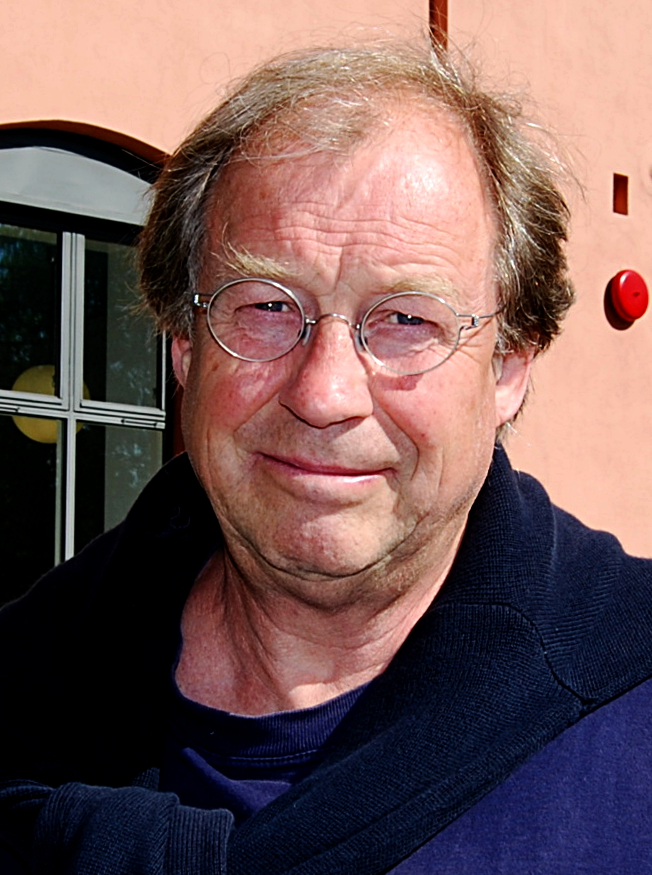
- Born: 12 May 1945; Tvedestrand, Norway
- Died: 7 January 2024 (aged 78); Arendal, Norway
- Education: Norwegian National Academy of Craft and Art Industry; Norwegian National Academy of Fine Arts
- Occupation: Painter
- Awards: Prince Eugen Medal (2000)

Leonard Rickhard (12 May 1945 – 7 January 2024) was a Norwegian painter.

== Personal life ==
Rickhard was born in Tvedestrand on 12 May 1945, a son of Birgit Andreassen and Leif Rickhard..

He was married to Berit Sundby.

== Career ==
Rickhard studied at the Norwegian National Academy of Craft and Art Industry from 1966 to 1967, and at the Norwegian National Academy of Fine Arts from 1967 to 1971.

He is represented at the National Museum of Norway, which has 13 of his works, as well as at museums in Stockholm, Bergen, Stavanger, and Kristiansand. He was awarded the Prince Eugen Medal in 2000.

Rickhard died in Arendal on 7 January 2024.
