= Harald Sohlberg =

Norwegian painter

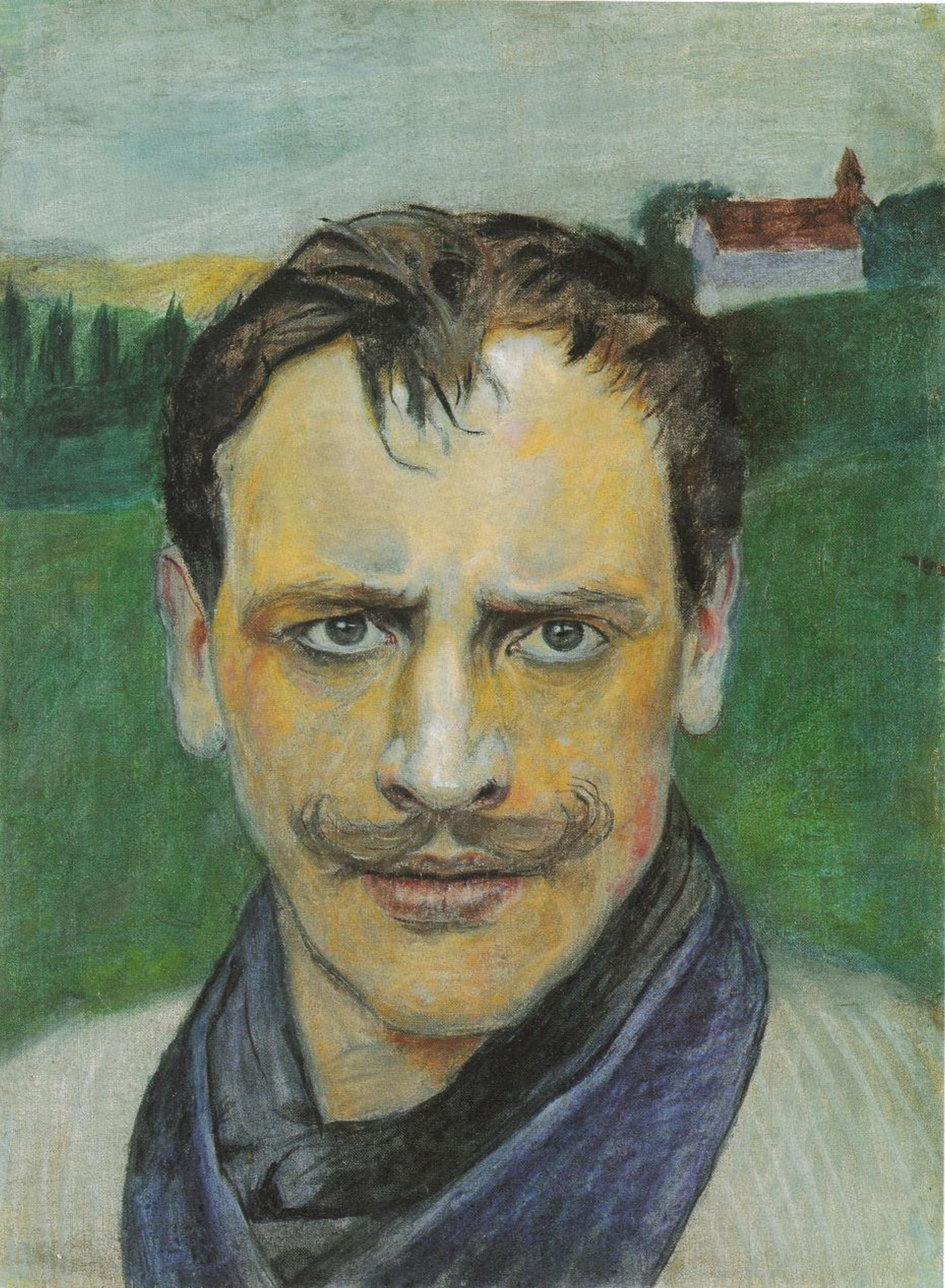
Self-portrait (Paris, 1896)

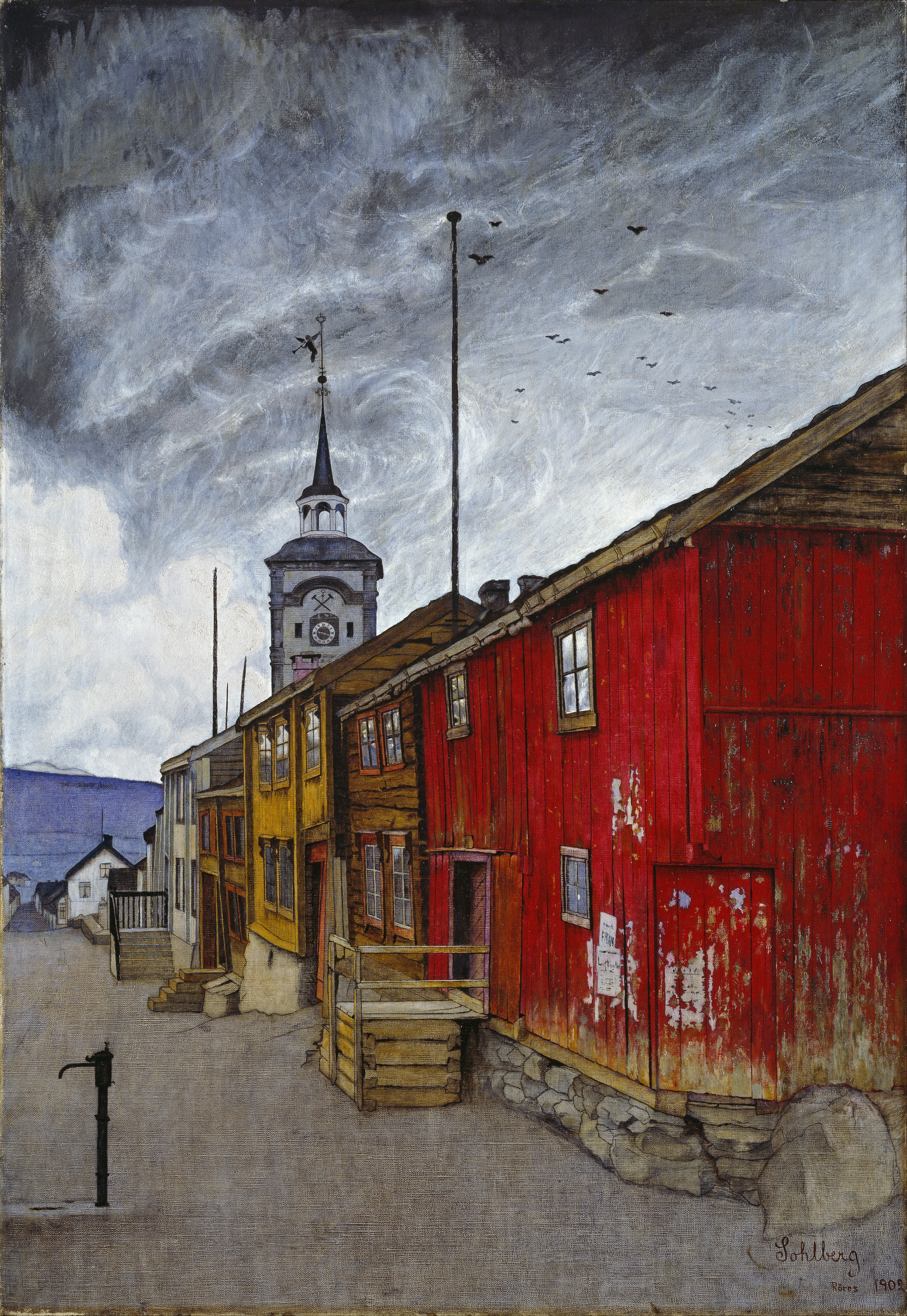
Street in Røros

Harald Oskar Sohlberg (29 November 1869 – 19 June 1935) was a Norwegian Neo-romantic painter.

== Biography ==
Sohlberg attended the Royal School of Art and Design of Christiania. He later trained under the graphic artist and painter Johan Nordhagen. Sohlberg attended the art school of Kristian Zahrtmann. He also studied as a pupil of Erik Werenskiold, Eilif Peterssen and Harriet Backer.

He is particularly known for his depictions of the Rondane mountains and the town of Røros. Perhaps his most widely recognized paintings, in several variations, is Winter's Night in Rondane, presently featured at the National Gallery (Nasjonalgalleriet).

== Cultural references ==
His painting Fisherman's Cottage was used as the cover of a book by John Burnside, Scottish writer, called A Summer of Drowning; Sohlberg is mentioned prominently throughout the novel, and one of the sections of this book is called "The Fisherman's House" in obvious homage to the painting.

Another painting, Flower Meadow of the North, was used as the cover of the book Morning Poems by Robert Bly.

== Selected works ==
- Natteglød (1893) Nasjonalgalleriet, Oslo.
- Sommernatt (1899) Nasjonalgalleriet, Oslo.
- Vinternatt i fjelene (1901) Hilmar Rekstens Samlinger, Bergen
- Fra Røros (1902) Nasjonalgalleriet, Oslo.
- Natt (1904) Trondheim Kunstmuseum, Trondheim
- En blomstereng nordpå (1906) Nasjonalgalleriet, Oslo.
- Eken (1908) Drammen Kunstmuseum
- Vinternatt i Rondane (1911–1914) Nasjonalgalleriet, Oslo.

== Gallery ==
Harald Sohlberg's works

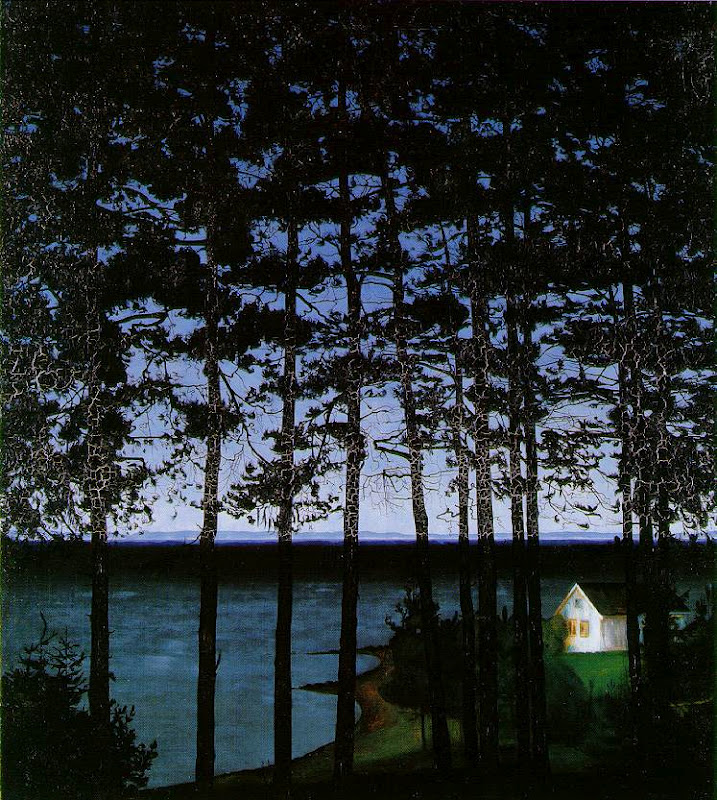
Fisherman's cottage, 1907

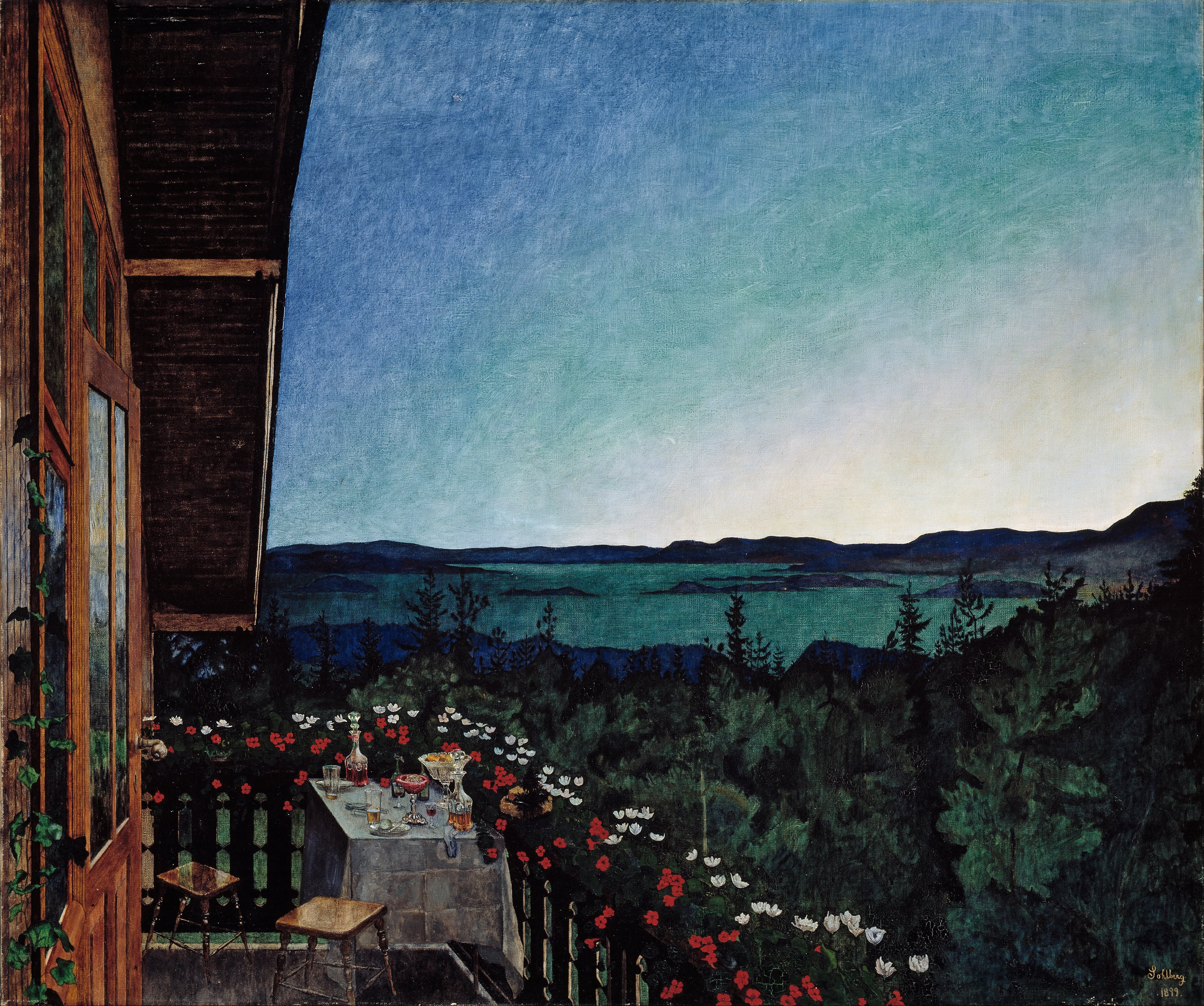
Summer Night, 1899

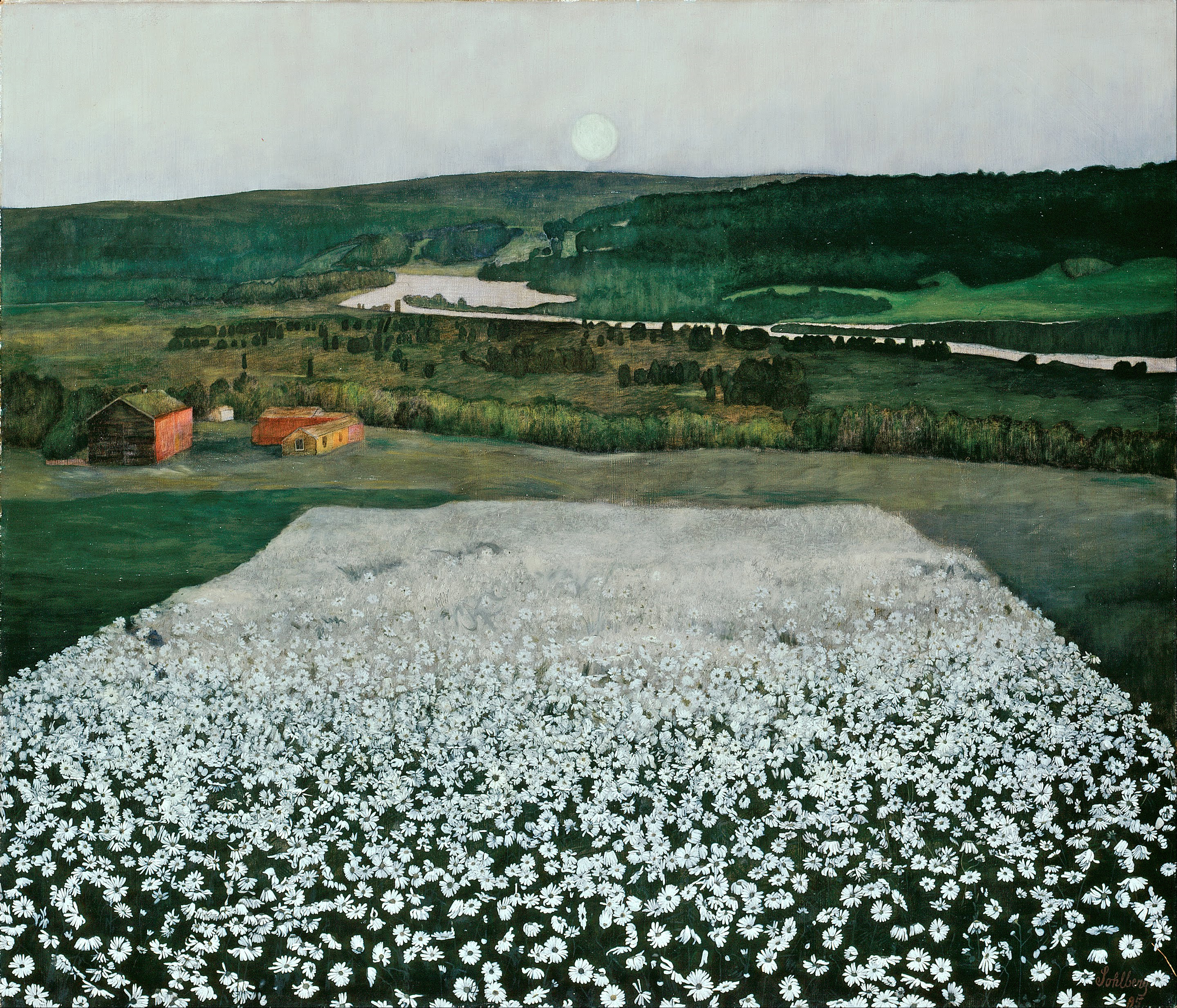
Flower Meadow in the North, 1905

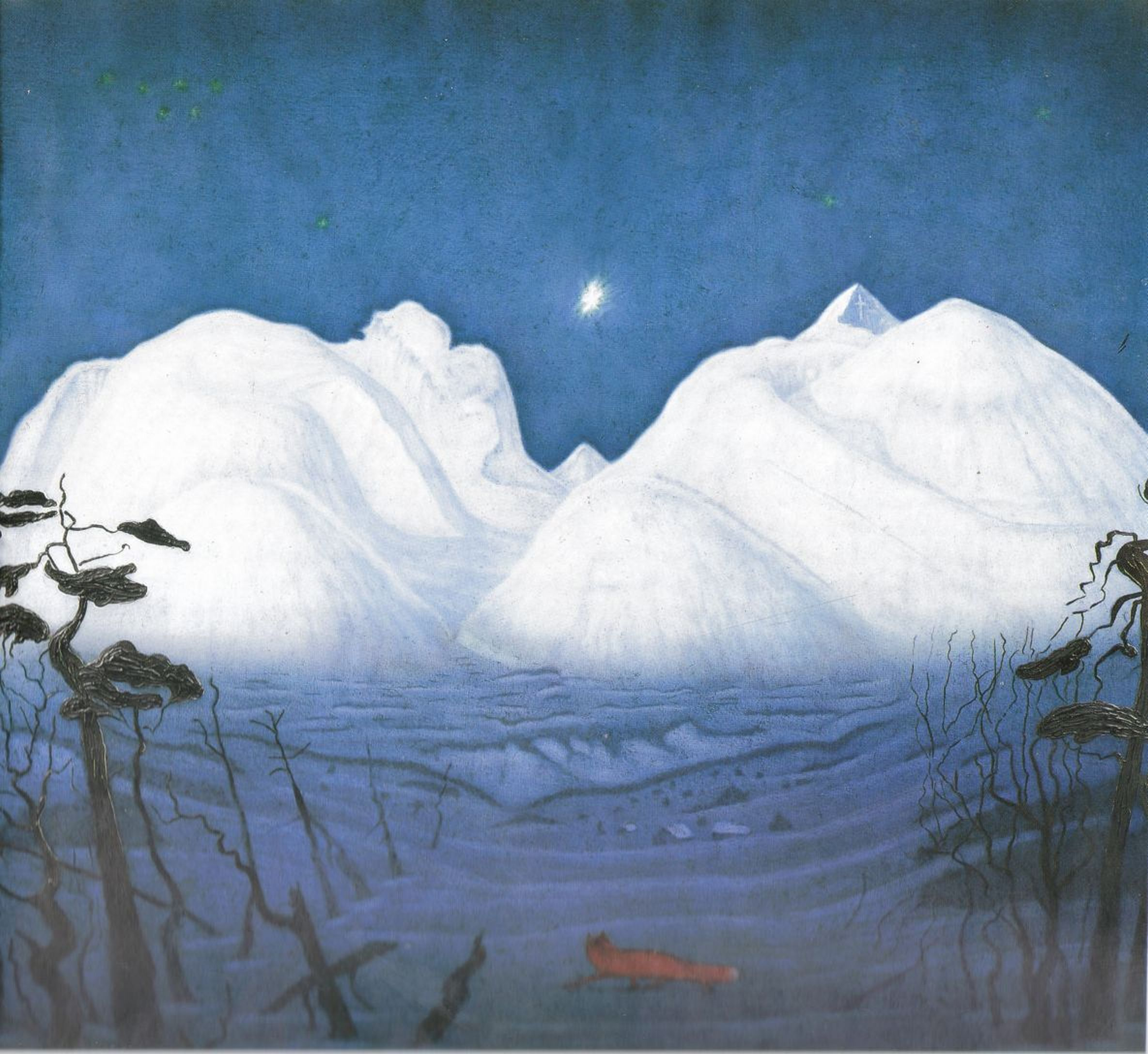
Vinternatt i Fellene III (Winter's Night in the Mountains III)

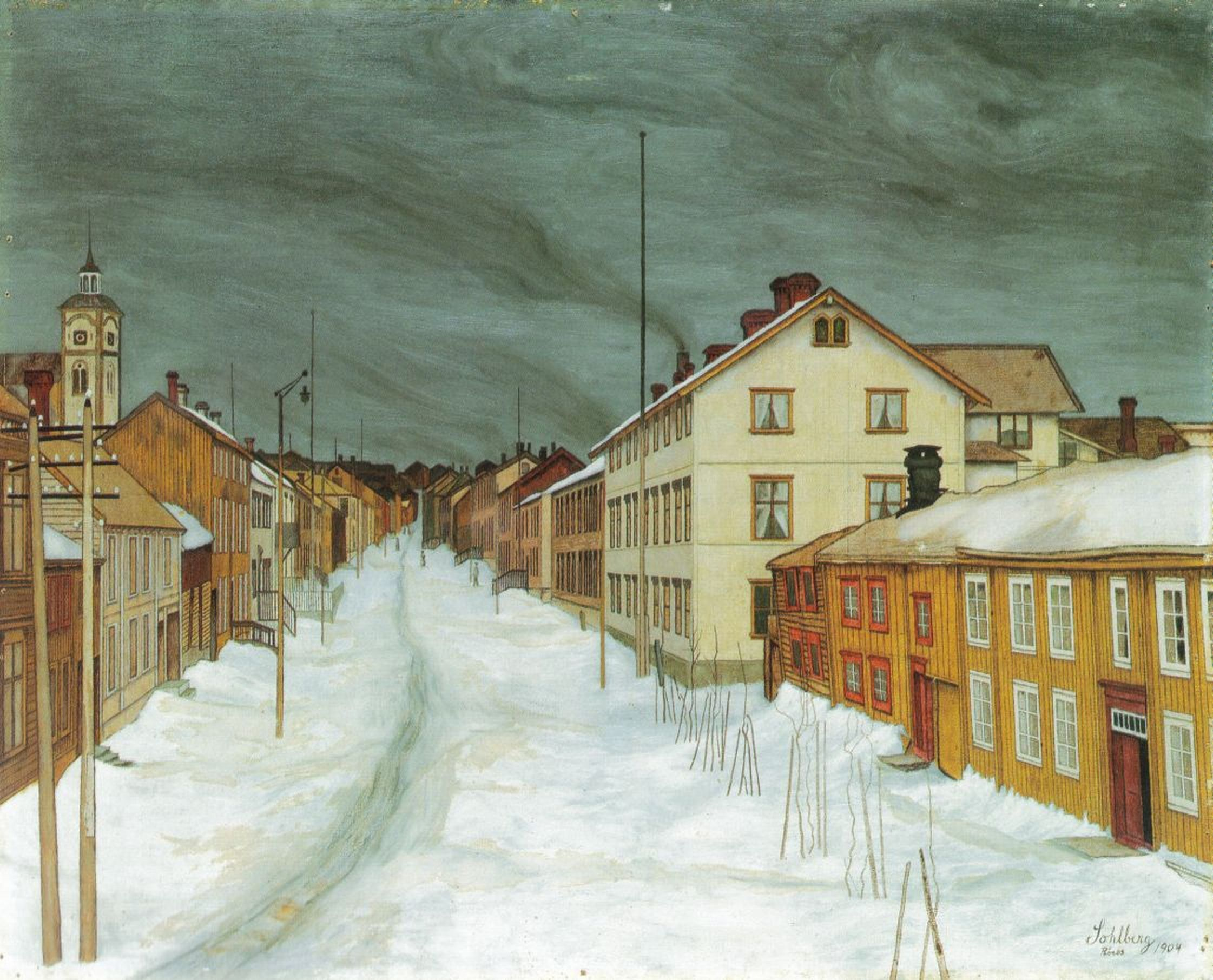
Storgaten Røros (Røros main street), 1903

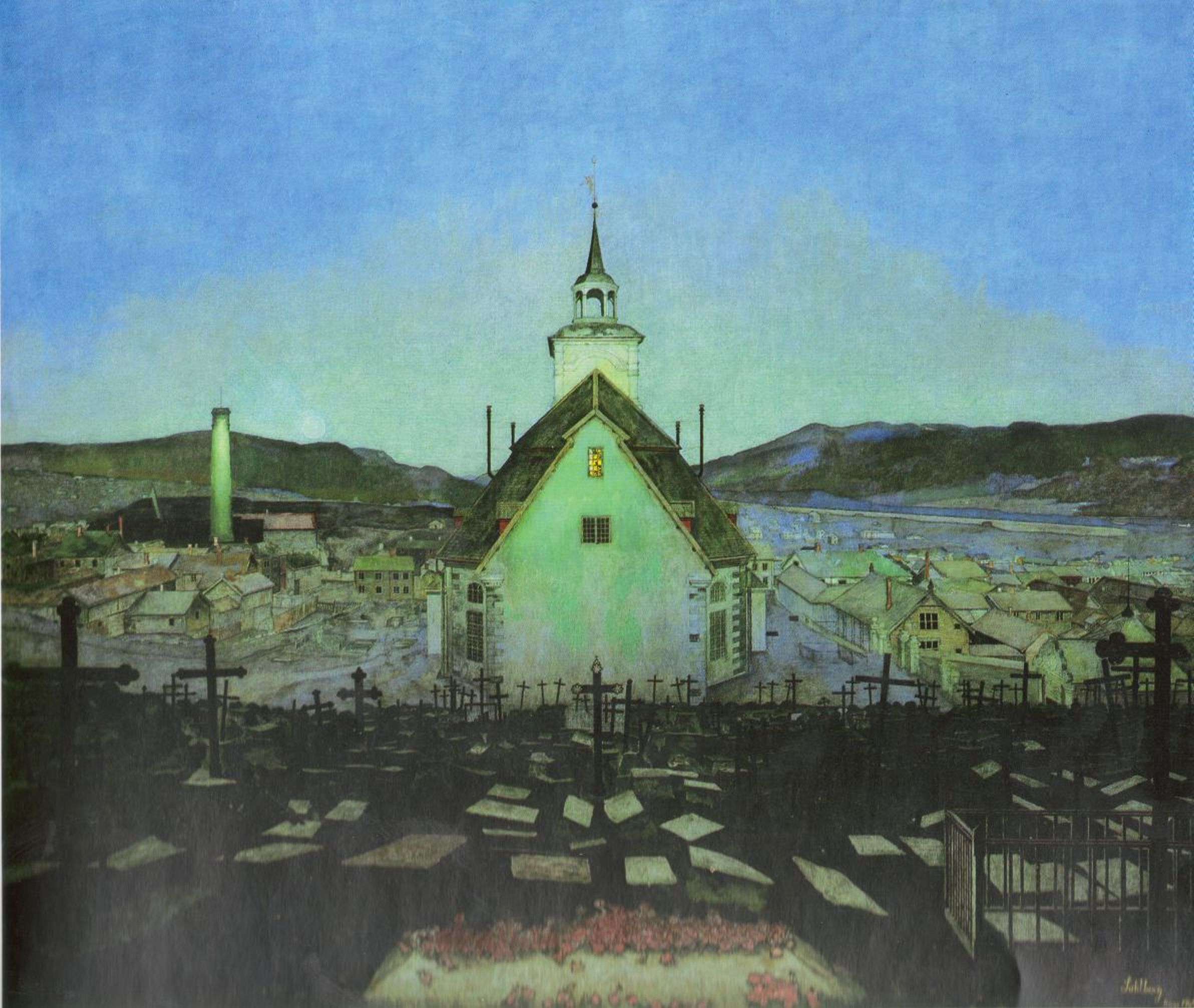
Natt (Night), 1904

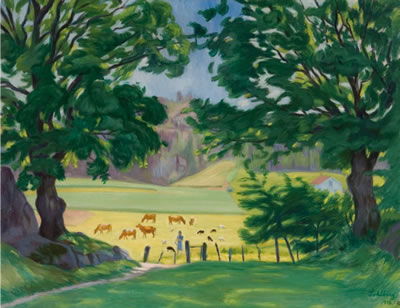
Sara vokter hjorden (Sara guarding the flock), c. 1910

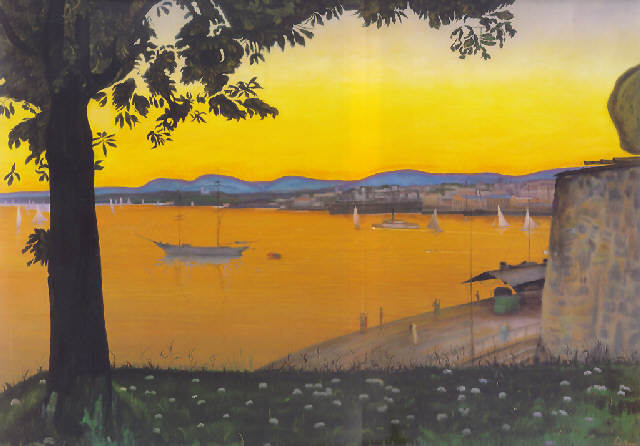
Oslo fra Akershus (Oslo from Akershus), c. 1900

== Other sources ==
- Bjerke, Øivind Storm (1991). Harald Sohlberg: Ensomhetens maler (in Norwegian). Gyldendal norsk forlag. ISBN 9788205202122.
- Bjerke, Øivind Storm (1996). Edvard Munch and Harald Sohlberg: Landscapes of the Mind (in Norwegian). National Academy of Design. ISBN 9781887149013.
- Lange, Marit Ingeborg; Norgaard Larsen, Peter (2003). Nordiske Stemninger: Harald Sohlberg. L.A. Ring (in Norwegian). Stiftelsen. ISBN 9788290734324.
