= Arne Ekeland =

Norwegian painter (1908–1994)

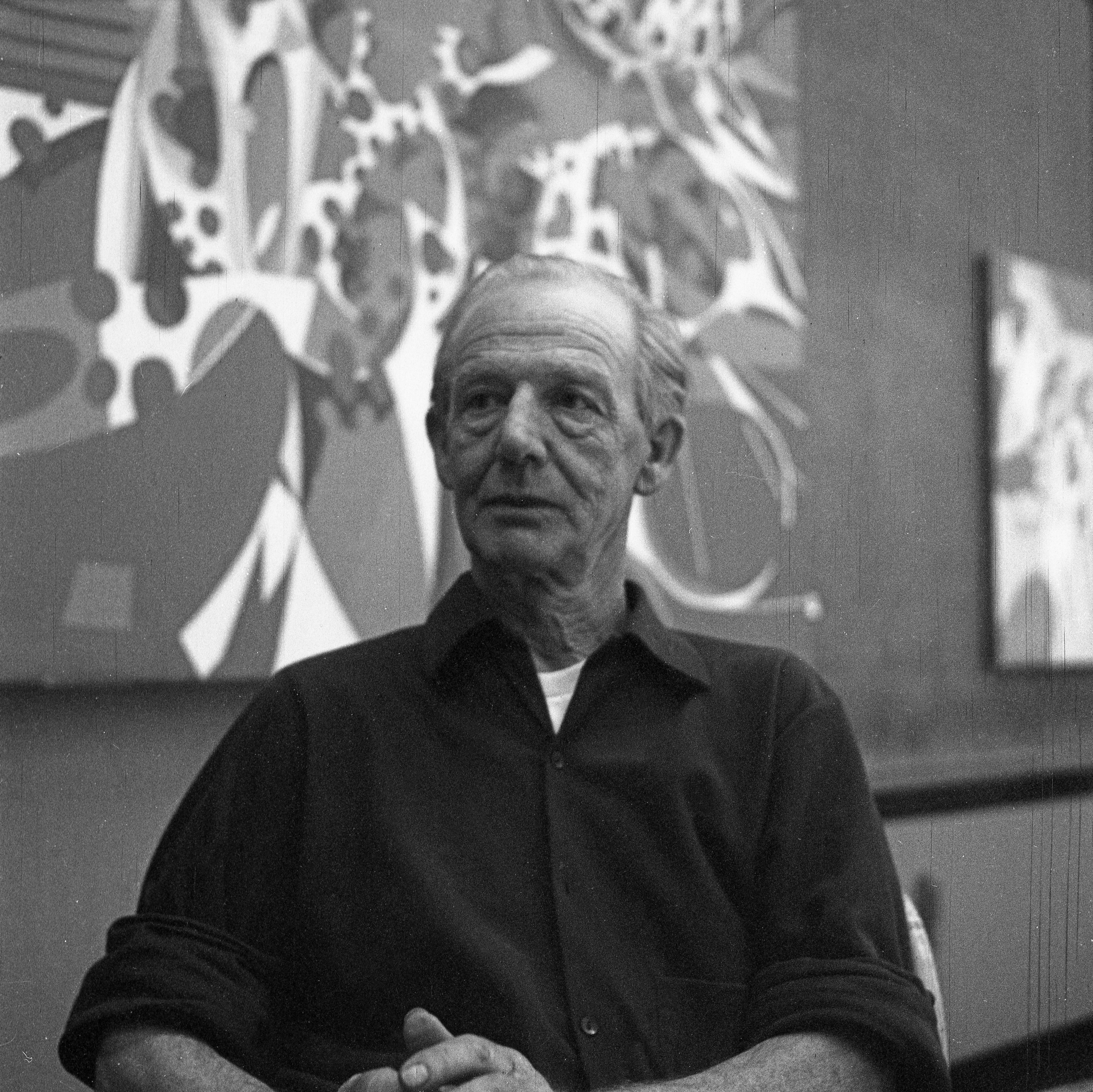
- Born: 14 August 1908; Eidsvoll, Norway
- Died: 28 February 1994 (aged 85)
- Occupation: Painter
- Awards: Prince Eugen Medal (1978); Order of St. Olav (1980)

Arne Ekeland (14 August 1908 – 28 February 1994) was a Norwegian painter.

He was born in Eidsvoll. Among his works are Ser vi står på trappene from 1939, De siste skudd from 1940, and Kampen from 1943, all located at the National Gallery in Oslo. He is also represented at the Gothenburg Museum of Art. His painting Frihetens søstre is located at Stortinget. He was awarded the Prince Eugen Medal in 1978, and was decorated Knight, First Class of the Order of St. Olav in 1980.

== Theft of art collection ==
During the period of 14–20.November 1991 thieves broke into Ekelands studio at Eidsvoll and stole 29 of his paintings. Having failed in its investigation to find the paintings, the police entered a shady deal with feared criminal Bjørn Arild Skjørsæther, hoping he would be able to find the paintings using methods the police were not permitted to. Skjørsæther, known as a member of the criminal gang Tveita-gjengen in Oslo, was in February 1992 fetched from serving prison-time in Oslo Prison, and offered a bounty of 300 000 kroner and false promises of better jail conditions if he could find and retrieve the stolen paintings. When Oslo Prison after 13 days discovered they had been fooled by the police, the mission was called off with no results to show for. The mission was passed on to another central figure in the criminal underworld of Oslo, Jan Kvalen, who in 1993 succeeded in retrieving all of the stolen paintings.
