= Trondheim Art Museum =

Art museum in Trondheim, Norway

Coordinates: 63°25′38″N 10°23′40″E

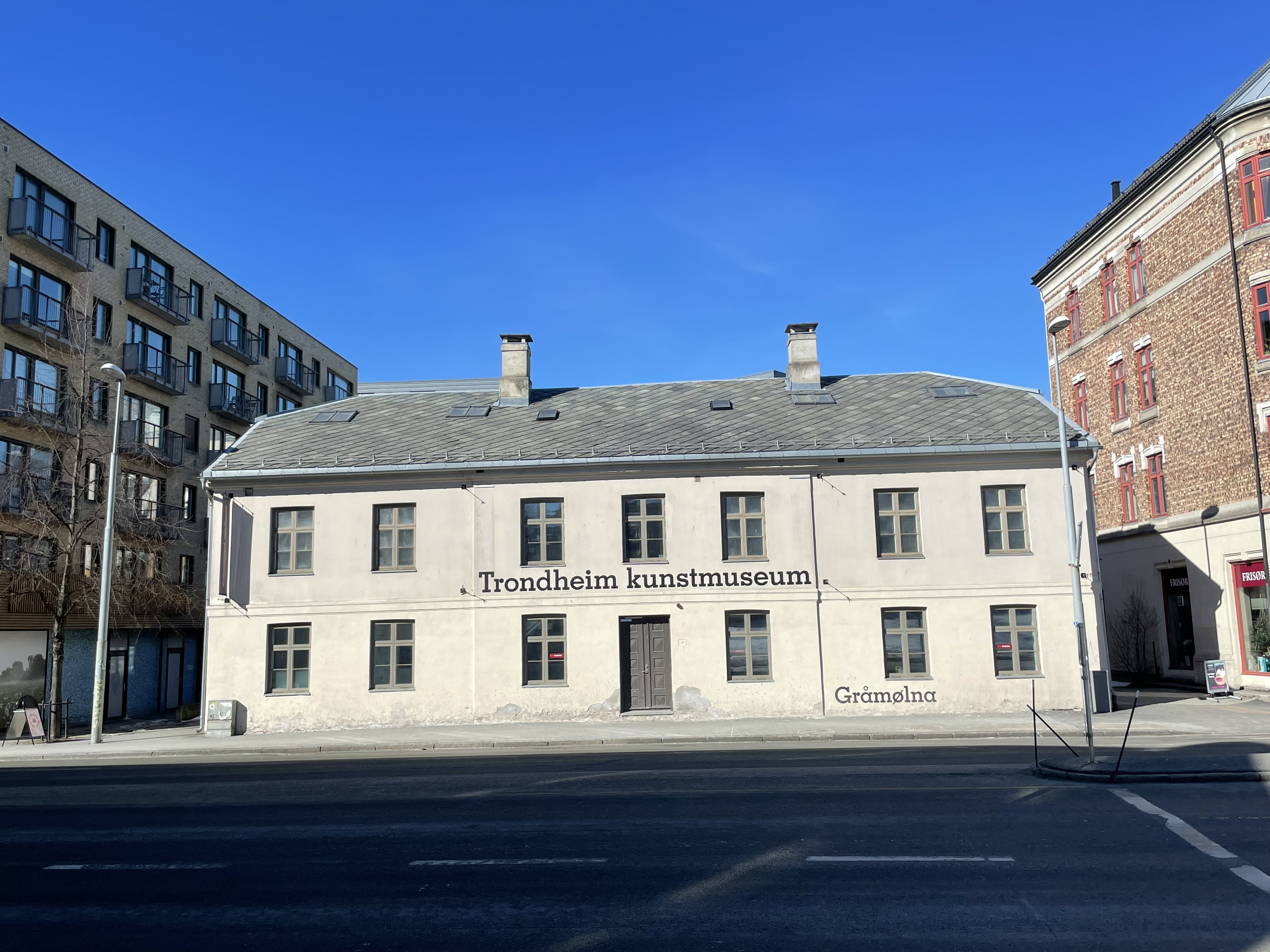
Gråmølna, part of the Trondheim Art Museum

The Trondheim Art Museum (Norwegian: Trondheim Kunstmuseum, previously Trøndelag Kunstgalleri) is an art museum located in Trondheim in Sør-Trøndelag county, Norway. The museum shows temporary exhibitions of international and regional art in dialogue with works from the museum's collection. The museum possesses Norway's third largest public art collection with an emphasis on art since 1850. The permanent collection contains iconic works such as Harald Sohlberg's Natt (Røros church) (1904), Georg Jacobsen's Haren (1922), and Peder Balke's Nordkapp (1870s).

The Trondheim Art Museum has two venues, TKM Bispegata (Bispegata 7 b) situated near the Nidaros Cathedral and TKM Gråmølna at Nedre Elvehavn. The main building in Bispegata 7 b was built in 1930 according to plans by architect Peter Daniel Hofflund. The Trondheim Art Museum was established in 1997, as a means to maintain the museum collection. The building has two floors with rooms of varied sizes and light. The building was refurbished in 2012, when artificial lights were installed to provide more stable temperature and lighting. Much of the interior was restored to its original state from 1930.

== Mission ==
The stated objective of the Trondheim Art Museum is to: "Create an interest and increase knowledge in the field of fine arts. This shall be accomplished through acquisition, conservation, scientific research and education, as well as the creation of various exhibitions with different kinds of fine art. The museum shall function as a documentation and competence centre for the region, and it shall, to the extent possible, be updated on essential national and international movements."

== History ==
By means of a letter addressed to the general public, I.C. Dahl started the initiative to establish the Trøndelag Art Gallery (Trøndelag Kunstgalleri) in 1845. At the time, Trondheim's population was around 13,000.

The collection was established in 1864. At that time it was known as Det Faste Galleri (The Permanent Gallery), a name that lasted until 1973. During the first phase, the royal residence of Stiftsgården was used, along with the local bank, Trondhjems Sparebank. From 1891 to 1914 buildings purchased from liquor company Trondhjems Brændevinssamlag housed the collection. Acquisitions were often made after art prize competitions. The collection increased significantly after the First World War. Today, it includes over 5,000 works.

Randi Nygaard Lium was the director from 1998 to 2010. Cathrine Hovdahl Vik was the director shortly before Pontus Kyander, the director from 2011 to 2014. Johan Börjesson is the present director. Börjesson accepted the position in March 2014.
