= Jens (given name) =

Male given name

- Pronunciation: German: [ˈjɛns]
- Gender: Male
- Language: Danish, Dutch, Faroese, German, Icelandic, Norwegian, Swedish

Other names
- Related names: Johannes

Jens is a male given name and a Danish, Dutch, German, Norwegian, Swedish, Icelandic, Faroese and Frisian derivative of Johannes. Jens was the most common first name for men and boys of all ages in Denmark between 2002 and 2012.

Notable people with the name include:

== A ==
- Jens Aars (1780–1834), Norwegian politician
- Jens Ludvig Andersen Aars (1852–1919), Norwegian politician
- Jens Ackermann (born 1975), German politician
- Jens Adams (born 1992), Belgian cyclist
- Jens Adler (born 1965), German footballer
- Jens Alber (born 1947), German sociologist and political scientist
- Jens Albinus (born 1965), Danish actor and director
- Jens Allwood (born 1947), Swedish academic
- Jens Almey (born 1996), Belgian short track speed skater
- Jens Aage Als-Nielsen (born 1937), Danish physicist
- Jens Altmann (born 1968), German Paralympic volleyball player
- Jens Andersen (businessman) (1866-1937), Norwegian businessperson
- Jens Andersen (boxer) (1929–2010), Danish boxer
- Jens Als Andersen (born 1958), Danish Paralympic sailor
- Jens Poul Andersen (1844–1935), Danish inventor
- Jens Chr. Andvig (born 1947), Norwegian economist
- Jens Petter Antonsen (born 1963), Norwegian musician
- Jens Thomas Arnfred (born 1947), Danish architect
- Jens Lauritz Arup (1793–1874), Norwegian politician
- Jens Berthel Askou (born 1982), Danish footballer
- Jens Assur (born 1970), Swedish photographer and film director
- Jens Axboe (born 1976), Danish Linux kernel hacker

== B ==
- Jens Bache-Wiig (1880–1965), Industrialist and professor
- Jens Baggesen (1764–1826), Danish poet
- Jens Glad Balchen (1926–2009), Norwegian civil engineer
- Jens Bang (1575–1644), Danish merchant
- Jens Bangsbo (born 1957), Danish physiologist and footballer
- Jens Bäumer (born 1978), German footballer
- Jens Baxmann (born 1985), German ice hockey player
- Jens Christian Bay (1871–1962), Danish-American writer and librarian
- Jens Michelsen Beck (1721–1791), Danish landowner and planter
- Jens Tolv Beck (1890–1939), Norwegian politician
- Jens Becker (born 1965), German bassist
- Jens Beckert (born 1967), German sociologist
- Jens Beckmann (born 1970), German-Australian chemist
- Jens Beeck (born 1969), German lawyer and politician
- Jens Henrik Beer Sr. (1731–1808), Norwegian politician
- Jens Henrik Beer (1799–1881), Norwegian politician
- Jens Behrens (born 1978), German politician
- Jens Andersen Beldenak (1450–1537), Danish bishop
- Jens Dall Bentzen (born 1968), Danish engineer
- Jens Christian Berg (1775–1852), Norwegian lawyer and historian
- Jens Jensen Berg (1760–1813), Danish ship captain and businessman
- Jens Bergensten (born 1979), Swedish video game programmer and designer
- Jens Bergenström (born 1980), Swedish ice hockey player
- Jens Jørn Bertelsen (born 1952), Danish footballer
- Jens Berthelsen (1890–1961), Danish fencer
- Jens Peter Berthelsen (1854–1934), Danish fencer
- Jens Beutel (1946–2019), German politician and judge
- Jens Biegert, German optical physicist and professor
- Jens Bigum (born 1938), Danish agrarian and business manager
- Jens Bille (1531–1575), Danish scribe
- Jens Bircherod (1664–1720), Danish theologian
- Jens Birkemose (1943–2022), Danish painter
- Jens Birkholm (1869–1915), Danish painter
- Jens Bjelke (1580–1659), Norwegian nobleman
- Jens Tillufssøn Bjelke (died 1559), Norwegian noble
- Jens Bjerre (adventurer) (1921–2020), Danish author, filmmaker, and adventurer
- Jens Björklund (1910–2000), Swedish weightlifter
- Jens Bjørneboe (1920–1976), Norwegian writer
- Jens Blauenfeldt (born 1968), Danish actor and director
- Jens Blauert (1938–2026), German scientist
- Jens Bloch (1761–1830), Danish theologian
- Jens Boalth (1725–1780), Norwegian educator
- Jens Bodemer (born 1989), German footballer and manager
- Jens Boden (born 1978), German speed skater
- Jens Bogren (born 1979), Swedish record producer
- Jens Böhrnsen (born 1949), German politician
- Jens Bojsen-Møller (born 1966), Danish sailor
- Jens Bolling (1915–1992), Norwegian actor and theatre director
- Jens Book-Jenssen (1910–1999), Norwegian singer and songwriter
- Jens Boyesen (1920–1996), Norwegian diplomat and politician
- Jens Brandenburg (born 1986), German politician
- Jens Carl Peter Brandt (1848–1912), Norwegian politician
- Jens Bratlie (1856–1939), Norwegian statesman, attorney and military officer
- Jens Harald Bratlie (born 1948), Norwegian pianist
- Jens Olavssøn Bratt (c. 1505–1548), Norwegian clergyman
- Jens Jacob Bregnø (1877–1946), Danish sculptor and ceramics designer
- Jens Peter Broch (1819–1886), Norwegian linguist
- Jens Arnfinn Brødsjømoen (born 1958), Norwegian politician
- Jens Büchner (1969–2018), German singer
- Jens Andreas Hjorth Bugge (1859–1939), Norwegian ship-owner
- Jens Bugge (1930–2014), Norwegian judge
- Jens Bull (1886–1956), Norwegian diplomat
- Jens Bullerjahn (1962–2022), German engineer and politician
- Jens Burman (born 1994), Swedish cross-country skier
- Jens Buss (born 1997), Chilean footballer
- Jens Byggmark (born 1985), Swedish alpine skier

== C ==
- Jens Cajuste (born 1999), Swedish footballer
- Jens Carlowitz (born 1964), East German sprinter
- Jens Carstens (born 1971), German drummer
- Jens Castrop (born 2003), German-born South Korean footballer
- Jens Chievitz (1889–1965), Danish gymnast
- Jens Christian Christensen (1856–1930), Danish politician
- Jens Christensen (bishop) (1899–1966), American Lutheran missionary
- Jens Christensen (sailor) (born 1953), Danish sailor
- Jens Peter Christensen (born 1956), Danish Supreme Court president
- Jens Clausen (1891–1969), American geneticist
- Jens Cools (born 1990), Belgian footballer
- Jens Cotta (born 1972), German politician
- Jens Peter Dahl-Jensen (1874–1960), Danish sculptor
- Jens Henrik Thulesen Dahl (born 1961), Danish politician

== D ==
- Jens Dantorp (born 1989), Swedish professional golfer
- Jens Dautzenberg (born 1974), German sprinter
- Jens Peter Debes (1776–1832), Norwegian judge and politician
- Jens Debusschere (born 1989), Belgian road cyclist
- Jens Deimel (born 1972), Nordic combined skier
- Jens Dekker (born 1998), Dutch cyclist
- Jens Dilling, German physicist
- Jens Christian Djurhuus (1773–1853), Faroese poet
- Jens Doberschütz (born 1957), East German rower
- Jens A. Doe (1891–1971), United States Army general
- Jens Lasse Dokkan (born 1961), Norwegian paralympic equestrian
- Jens Dowe (born 1968), German footballer
- Jens Gram Dunker (1892–1981), Norwegian architect
- Jens Dyck (born 1990), Belgian footballer

== E ==
- Jens Eckardt (born 1968), Danish sailor
- Jens Edman (born 1976), Swedish auto racing driver
- Jens G. Eggers, British physicist
- Jens Mikkelsen Ehrenborg (1621–1690), Danish soldier and public servant
- Jens Einarsson (born 1954), Icelandic handball player
- Jens Eisert (born 1970), German physicist
- Jens E. Ekornes (1908–1976), Norwegian businessman
- Jens Petter Ekornes (1942–2008), Norwegian politician
- Jens Laursøn Emborg (1876–1957), Danish organist and composer
- Jens Enevoldsen (1907–1980), Danish chess player
- Jens Erichstrup (1775–1826), Norwegian politician
- Jens Eriksen (born 1969), Danish badminton player
- Jens Juul Eriksen (1926–2004), Danish cyclist
- Jens Eriksson (born 1984), Swedish Ice hockey player
- Jens Jacob Eschels (1757–1842), Nautical captain
- Jens Esmark (1763–1839), Danish-Norwegian professor of mineralogy
- Jens Essendrop (1723–1801), Norwegian clergyman and topographical writer
- Jens Evensen (1917–2004), Norwegian politician
- Jens Ewald (born 1983), German slalom canoeist
- Jens Schou Fabricius (1758–1841), Norwegian naval officer

== F ==
- Jens Fahrbring (born 1984), Swedish professional golfer
- Jens Falkenberg (1875–1963), Norwegian equestrian
- Jens Faurschou (born 1960), Danish art collector
- Jens Feder (1939–2019), Norwegian physicist
- Jens Erik Fenstad (1935–2020), Norwegian mathematician
- Jens Fiedler (cyclist) (born 1970), German cyclist
- Jens Fiedler (canoeist), German canoeist
- Jens Fiedler (handballer) (born 1966), German handball player
- Jens Filbrich (born 1979), German cross-country skier
- Jens Fink-Jensen (born 1956), Danish writer, photographer, composer and architect
- Jens Fischer (born 1946), Swedish cinematographer
- Jens Fjellström (born 1966), Swedish footballer
- Jens P. Flå (1923–2002), Norwegian politician
- Jens Frahm (born 1951), German physicist
- Jens Franke (born 1964), German mathematician
- Jens Lorenz Franzen (1937–2018), German paleontologist
- Jens B. Frederiksen, Greenlandic politician
- Jens Fredricson (born 1967), Swedish equestrian
- Jens Andreas Friis (1821–1896), Norwegian linguist
- Jens Frølich (1914–1938), Norwegian fencer

== G ==
- Jens Gäbel (born 1968), German wheelchair curler and Paralympian
- Jens Gad, German producer, songwriter, and guitarist
- Jens Gaiser (born 1978), German Nordic combined skier
- Jens Galaaen (1893–1963), Norwegian newspaper editor and politician
- Jens Galschiøt (born 1954), Danish artist
- Jens Martin Gammelby (born 1995), Danish footballer
- Jens Gasmann (1776–1850), Norwegian businessperson and politician
- Jens Geier (born 1961), German politician
- Jens Gieseke (historian) (born 1964), German historian
- Jens Gieseke (politician) (born 1971), German politician
- Jens Gjesing (born 1986), Danish footballer and manager
- Jens Gran Gleditsch (1860–1931), Norwegian bishop and theologian
- Jens Glücklich (born 1966), East German cyclist
- Jens Erik Gould (born 1981), American journalist
- Jens Graff (born 1942), German-born Norwegian dancer
- Jens Grahl (born 1988), German footballer
- Jens Gram (1840–1912), Norwegian industrialist
- Jens Jensen Gram (1779–1824), Norwegian jurist and politician
- Jens Gran (1794–1881), Norwegian politician
- Jens Grand (1260–1327), Danish archbishop
- Jens Grede (born 1978), Swedish businessman
- Jens Grembowietz (born 1987), German footballer
- Jens Christian Grøndahl (born 1959), Danish writer
- Jens Groth, Danish cryptography researcher
- Jens Gunderssen (1912–1969), Norwegian actor and theatre director
- Jens H. Gundlach (born 1961), German physicist
- Jens Gusek (born 1965), German fencer
- Jens Gustafson (footballer, born 1973), Swedish footballer
- Jens Gustafsson (born 1978), Swedish footballer and manager

== H ==
- Jens Haaning (born 1965), Danish artist
- Jens Hacke (born 1973), German political scientist
- Jens Friedenreich Hage (1752–1831), Danish merchant and landowner
- Jens Andersen Hagen (1832–1906), Norwegian politician
- Jens Hajslund (1877–1964), Danish sport shooter
- Jens Halfwassen (1958–2020), German philosopher
- Jens Braage Halvorsen (1845–1900), Norwegian librarian and literary historian
- Jens Hanefeld (born 1964), German diplomat
- Jens Christian Hansen (1932–2014), Norwegian geographer
- Jens Hoyer Hansen (1940–1999), Danish born New Zealand jeweller
- Jens Jørgen Hansen (1939–2022), Danish footballer and manager
- Jens Kristian Hansen (born 1971), Faroese footballer
- Jens Marni Hansen (born 1974), Faroese musician
- Jens Peter Hansen (1927-1996), Danish footballer
- Jens Smedegaard Hansen (born 1957), Danish sprinter
- Jens Härtel (born 1969), German footballer and manager
- Jens Hartwig (born 1980), German actor
- Jens Harzer (born 1972), German actor
- Jens Christian Hauge (1915–2006), Norwegian resistance member
- Jens Petter Hauge (born 1999), Norwegian football player
- Jens Edv. Haugland (1924–1981), Norwegian politician
- Jens Haugland (1910–1991), Norwegian politician
- Jens Haven (1724–1796), Danish-Canadian Moravian missionary
- Jens Hegeler (born 1988), German footballer
- Jens Pauli Heinesen (1932–2011), Faroese writer
- Jens Garðar Helgason (born 1976), Icelandic politician
- Jens Hellgren (born 1989), Swedish ice hockey player
- Jens Hellström (born 1977), Swedish racing driver
- Jens Henschel (born 1964), German footballer
- Jens Heppner (born 1964), German cyclist
- Jens O. Herrle (born 1968), German micropaleontologist
- Jens Hilgers (born 1975), German serial entrepreneur
- Jens Hirschberg (born 1964), East German long jumper
- Jens Hjertø-Dahl (born 2005), Norwegian footballer
- Jens Hofer (born 1997), Liechtenstein footballer
- Jens Hoffmann (born 1974), Costa Rican writer and educator
- Jens Hoffmann (filmmaker), German director and writer
- Jens Högbom (born 1995), Swedish ice hockey player
- Jens Höing (born 1987), German racing driver
- Jens Holm (born 1971), Swedish politician
- Jens Holmboe (politician) (1821–1891), Norwegian politician
- Jens Holmboe (botanist) (1880–1943), Norwegian botanist, professor and author
- Jens Holmboe (bailiff) (1752–1804), Norwegian bailiff
- Jens Juul Holst (born 1945), Danish physician and physiologist
- Jens Holstad (1889–1961), Norwegian actor
- Jens Wilken Hornemann (1770–1841), Danish botanist
- Jens Christian Hostrup (1818–1892), Danish poet, dramatist and priest
- Jens Howe (born 1961), German fencer
- Jens Husebø (born 1999), Norwegian footballer
- Jens Høyrup (born 1943), Danish mathematician and historian of mathematics
- Jens Høysgaard (1698–1773), Danish philologist
- Jens Hübler (born 1961), German sprinter
- Jens Hultén (born 1963), Swedish actor
- Jens Hundseid (1883–1965), Norwegian politician
- Jens Hvass (1898–1996), Danish scout

== I ==
- Jens Ingwersen (1871–1956), Danish architect

== J ==
- Jens Jacobs (born 2003), Dutch footballer
- Jens Bjerre Jacobsen (1903–1986), Danish composer and organist
- Jens Peter Jacobsen (1847–1885), Danish novelist, poet, and scientist
- Jens Jäger (born 1963), German wheelchair curler and Paralympian
- Jens Jakobs (born 1985), Swedish ice hockey player
- Jens Janse (born 1986), Dutch footballer
- Jens Jonas Jansen (1844–1912), Norwegian priest, teacher and columnist
- Jens Carsten Jantzen (born 1948), German mathematician
- Jens Jensen-Egeberg (1848–1922), Danish painter
- Jens Jensen (politician) (1865–1936), Australian politician
- Jens Berendt Jensen (born 1940), Danish rower
- Jens Christian Jensen (1928–2013), German art historian and curator
- Jens Jensen (landscape architect) (1860–1951), Danish-American landscape designer
- Jens Jensen (trade unionist) (1859–1928), Danish trade unionist and politician
- Jens Jensen (footballer) (1890-1957), Danish footballer
- Jens Kristian Jensen (1885–1956), Danish gymnast
- Jens S. Jensen (1946–2015), Swedish photographer and writer
- Jens Martin Arctander Jenssen (1885–1968), Norwegian politician
- Jens Jeremies (born 1974), German footballer
- Jens Adolf Jerichau (1816–1883), Danish sculptor
- Jens Jersild (1903–1978), Danish law-enforcement officer and author
- Jens Jessen (born 1967), Danish footballer
- Jens Joel (born 1978), Danish politician
- Jens Johannessen (born 1934), Norwegian painter and graphical artist
- Jens Christian Johansen (1868–1929), Danish engineer and consul
- Jens Johansson (born 1963), Swedish keyboardist
- Jens Joneleit (born 1968), German composer
- Jens Jønsson (born 1993), Danish footballer
- Jens Josef (born 1967), German composer and flutist
- Jens Gram Jr. (1897–1982), Norwegian barrister and politician
- Jens Juel-Vind (1694–1726), Danish chamberlain and landowner
- Jens Hermansen Juel (1580–1634), Danish nobleman
- Jens Juel (1897–1978) (1897–1978), Danish estate owner
- Jens Juel (diplomat) (1631–1700), Danish diplomat
- Jens Juel (painter) (1745–1802), Danish painter

== K ==
- Jens Kamp (1845–1900), Danish folklorist
- Jens Kampmann (1937–2026), Danish politician
- Jens Karlsson (born 1982), Swedish ice hockey player
- Jens Kask (1966–2011), Swedish ice sledge hockey player
- Jens Matthias Pram Kaurin (1804–1863), Norwegian Lutheran bishop and theologian
- Jens Keller (born 1970), German football player and manager
- Jens Kestner (born 1971), German politician
- Jens Keukeleire (born 1988), Belgian road racing cyclist
- Jens Kiefer (born 1974), German footballer and manager
- Jens Zetlitz Monrad Kielland (1866–1926), Norwegian architect
- Jens Zetlitz Kielland (1816–1881), Norwegian consul and artist
- Jens Kindervater (born 1974), German disc jockey
- Jens Kirkegaard (1889–1966), Danish gymnast
- Jens Klemmensen (1902–1977), Danish architect
- Jens Klingmann (born 1990), German racing driver
- Jens Klok (1889–1974), Danish architect
- Jens Knipphals (born 1958), German long jumper
- Jens Knippschild (born 1975), German tennis player
- Jens Knossalla (born 1986), German entertainer and television presenter
- Jens Martin Knudsen (1930–2005), Danish astrophysicist
- Jens Martin Knudsen (footballer) (born 1967), Faroese footballer
- Jens Nygaard Knudsen (1942–2020), Danish toy designer
- Jens Isak de Lange Kobro (1882–1967), Norwegian politician
- Jens Koch (born 1981), German photographer
- Jens Koeppen (born 1962), German politician
- Jens Christian Kofoed (1864–1941), Danish architect
- Jens Kølbæk (1945–2024), Danish chess player
- Jens Kolding (born 1952), Danish footballer
- Jens Köppen (born 1966), East German rower
- Jens Kraemer (born 1963), Canadian soccer player and coach
- Jens Edvard Kraft (1784–1853), Norwegian literary historian
- Jens Kraft (1720–1765), Norwegian mathematician
- Jens Krag-Juel-Vind (1724–1776), Danish nobleman, Supreme Court justice and landowner
- Jens Otto Krag (1914–1978), Prime Minister of Denmark
- Jens Nielsen Kragh (1729–1773), Danish West Indies colonial administrator
- Jens Kreisel (born 1969), German physicist and academic administrator
- Jens Kristiansen (born 1952), Danish chess grandmaster
- Jens Kroker (born 1969), German Paralympic sailor
- Jens Kruppa (born 1976), German swimmer
- Jens Kuhle
- Jens Kujawa (born 1965), German basketball player
- Jens Kunath (born 1967), German footballer
- Jens Kuross, American singer-songwriter
- Jens Kyllönen (born 1989), Finnish poker player

== L ==
- Jens Lambæk (1899–1985), Danish gymnast
- Jens Landmark (1811–1880), Norwegian politician
- Jens Langeneke (born 1977), German footballer
- Jens Lapidus (born 1974), Swedish crime writer and lawyer
- Jens Larsen (born 1969), Danish beach volleyball player
- Jens Peter Larsen (1902–1988), Danish musicologist
- Jens Fredrick Larson (1891–1981), American pilot and architect
- Jens Olof Lasthein (born 1964), Swedish freelance photographer
- Jens Lauritzen (born 1953), Danish politician
- Jens Laursen (1888–1967), Danish gymnast
- Jens Lehmann (born 1969), German footballer
- Jens Lehmann (cyclist) (born 1967), German cyclist and politician
- Jens Lehmann (scientist) (born 1982), Artificial Intelligence researcher
- Jens Lekman (born 1981), Swedish musician and songwriter
- Jens Lieblein (1827–1911), Norwegian Egyptologist and magazine editor
- Jens Lien (born 1967), Norwegian film director
- Jens Lillelund (1904–1981), Danish resistance leader and fighter during World War II
- Jens Lind (botanist) (1874–1939), Danish botanist
- Jens Lind (businessman) (1763–1821), Danish sea captain and slave trader
- Jens Lindemann (born 1966), German-born Canadian musician
- Jens Lindhard (1922–1997), Danish theoretical physicist
- Jens Lindhardt (born 1946), Danish rower
- Jens von der Lippe (1911–1990), Norwegian ceramic artist, teacher, and art writer
- Jens Oliver Lisberg (1896–1920), Faroese flag designer
- Jens Harskov Loczi (born 1963), Danish sports shooter
- Jens Lohmann (born 1956), Mexican modern pentathlete
- Jens Lööke (born 1997), Swedish ice hockey player
- Jens Lothe (1931–2016), Norwegian physicist
- Jens Lubrich, German canoeist
- Jens Ludwig (born 1977), German musician
- Jens Ludwig (economist) (born 1968), American economist
- Jens Luedecke (born 1950), East German rower
- Jens Lukas (born 1966), German distance runner
- Jens Lund (1871–1924), Danish painter, designer and graphic artist
- Jens Lund (sculptor) (1873–1946), Danish sculptor
- Jens Michael Lund (1872–1943), Norwegian lawyer and civil servant
- Jens Hansen Lundager (1853–1930), Australian politician
- Jens Lunde (1884–1974), Norwegian politician
- Jens Lundgaard (1911–1997), Danish footballer
- Jens Lundqvist (born 1979), Swedish table tennis player

== M ==
- Jens Christian Madsen (born 1970), Danish footballer
- Jens Christian Mosegaard Madsen (born 1972), Danish footballer
- Jens Christian Magnus (1920–2017), Norwegian military officer and politician
- Jens Maier (born 1962), German lawyer and politician
- Jens Malling (1909–1969), Swedish diplomat
- Jens Marcussen (1926–2007), Norwegian politician
- Jens Marklof (born 1971), German mathematician
- Jens Marquardt (born 1967), German motor sports engineer
- Jens Meierhenrich, International relations scholar
- Jens Meiler (born 1974), German biochemist
- Jens Meilleur (born 1993), Canadian-German ice hockey player
- Jens Meilvang (born 1981), Danish politician
- Jens Christian Mellbye (1914–1993), Norwegian judge
- Jens Melzig (born 1965), German footballer
- Jens Mergenthaler (born 1997), German track and field athlete
- Jens Metzger (born 1990), German politician
- Jens Meyer (born 1971), German politician
- Jens Kramer Mikkelsen (born 1951), Danish politician
- Jens Möckel (born 1988), German footballer
- Jens Peter Møller (1783–1854), Danish painter
- Jens Reno Møller (born 1971), Danish racing driver
- Jens Jørn Mortensen (1927–2023), Danish weightlifter
- Jens Marcus Mottré (1886–1966), Norwegian politician
- Jens Mouris (born 1980), Dutch cyclist
- Jens Müller (pilot) (1917–1999), Norwegian pilot
- Jens Müller (luger) (born 1965), East German luger
- Jens Mungard (1885–1940), Frisian writer
- Jens Munk (1579–1628), Danish navigator and explorer
- Jens Münster (born 1990), German politician

== N ==
- Jens Nacke (born 1971), German politician
- Jens Naessens (born 1991), Belgian footballer
- Jens NapãtôK' (born 1966), Greenlandic politician
- Jens Bruun de Neergaard (1742–1788), Danish judge and landowner
- Jens Nickel (born 1965), German ten-pin bowler
- Jens Niehls (born 1951), German equestrian
- Jens Nielsen, Danish biologist
- Jens Rud Nielsen (1894–1979), Danish-American physicist
- Jens Nielson (1821–1906), Mormon leader
- Jens Peter Nierhoff (born 1960), Danish badminton player
- Jens R. Nilssen (1880–1964), Norwegian illustrator
- Jens Nilsson (1948–2018), Swedish politician
- Jens Nilssøn (1538–1600), Norwegian clergyman, educator, poet and author
- Jens Nohka (born 1976), German bobsledder
- Jens Henrik Nordlie (1910–1996), Norwegian businessman and resistance fighter
- Jens Nordqvist (born 1959), Swedish canoeist
- Jens Nordström (born 1976), Swedish footballer
- Jens Nordvig (born 1974), Danish economist
- Jens Nørskov (born 1952), Danish physicist
- Jens Nowotny (born 1974), German footballer
- Jens Nygaard (1931–2001), American conductor
- Jens Nygård (sport shooter) (1934–2005), Norwegian sports shooter
- Jens Nygård (born 1978), Finnish footballer
- Jens Nykvist (born 1968), Swedish Navy officer

== O ==
- Jens Oddershede (born 1945), Danish chemistry professor and academic
- Jens Odewald (1940–2024), German business executive
- Jens Odgaard (born 1999), Danish footballer
- Jens Lurås Oftebro (born 2000), Norwegian Nordic combined skier
- Jens David Ohlin (born 1974), American legal academic
- Jens Öhling (born 1962), Swedish ice hockey player
- Jens Okking (1939–2018), Danish actor, singer and politician.
- Jens Tang Olesen (born 1947), Danish football manager
- Jens Fønsskov Olsen (born 1975), Danish football manager
- Jens Olsen (clockmaker) (1872–1945), Danish clockmaker
- Jens Olsson (badminton) (born 1964), Swedish badminton player
- Jens Olsson (ice hockey) (born 1984), Swedish ice hockey player
- Jens Orback (born 1959), Swedish politician
- Jens Østerholm (1928–2006), Danish actor
- Jens Kjell Otterbech (born 1933), Norwegian diplomat

== P ==
- Jens Paeslack (born 1974), German footballer
- Jens Paludan-Müller (1771–1845), Danish bishop
- Jens Peick (born 1981), German politician
- Jens Petersen (1941–2012), Danish footballer
- Jens Peterson (1880–1953), Australian politician
- Jens Pieper (born 1968), German archer
- Jens Piesbergen (born 1964), Swiss curler and coach
- Jens Podevijn (born 1989), Belgian footballer
- Jens Pohlmann (born 1978), German water polo player
- Jens Pørneki (born 1969), Danish rower
- Jens Portin (born 1984), Finnish footballer
- Jens Potteck (born 1968), East German sport shooter
- Jens Pühse (born 1972), German politician
- Jens Pulver (born 1974), American mixed martial arts fighter

== Q ==
- Jens Quistgaard (1919–2008), Danish sculptor and designer
- Jens Quorning, Danish multihull designer

== R ==
- Jens Ramme (born 1963), German footballer
- Jens Rasiejewski (born 1975), German footballer
- Jens B. Rasmussen (1947–2005), Danish herpetologist
- Jens Eilstrup Rasmussen (born 1966), Danish software engineer
- Jens Elmegård Rasmussen (1944–2013), Danish linguist
- Jens Rasmussen (human factors expert) (1926–2018), Danish system safety and human factors professor
- Jens Rasmussen (speedway rider) (born 1959), Danish speedway rider
- Jens Rathke (1769–1855), Norwegian zoologist
- Jens Raven (born 2005), Indonesian footballer
- Jens Christian Refsgaard (born 1951), Danish hydrologist and academic
- Jens Reich (born 1939), German scientist
- Jens Reimers (1941–2001), German discus thrower
- Jens Revold (born 1948), Norwegian politician
- Jens Reynders (born 1998), Belgian cyclist
- Jens Riewa (born 1963), German television news presenter
- Jens Rinke (born 1990), Danish footballer
- Jens Risager (born 1971), Danish footballer
- Jens Risom (1916–2016), Danish-American furniture designer
- Jens Robben (born 1983), German footballer
- Jens Roepstorff (born 1960), Danish handball player
- Jens Rohde (born 1970), Danish politician
- Jens Rolfsen (1765–1819), Norwegian merchant and politician
- Jens Toller Rosenheim (1636–1690), Norwegian nobleman, jurist and official
- Jens Rosing (1925–2008), Greenlandic artist
- Jens Rostgaard (1650–1715), Danish soldier, civil servant, judge and antiquarian
- Jens Rusk (died 1611), Danish clergyman
- Jens Rydgren (born 1969), Swedish political sociologist
- Jens Rydström (born 1955), Swedish historian
- Jens Fredrik Ryland (born 1974), Norwegian guitarist
- Jens Rynning (1778–1857), Norwegian priest

== S ==
- Jens Salumäe (born 1981), Estonian Nordic combined skier and ski jumper
- Jens Salvesen (1883–1976), Norwegian sailor
- Jens Christian Folkman Schaanning (1804–1886), Norwegian politician
- Jens August Schade (1903–1978), Danish poet
- Jens Schanche (1717–1787), Norwegian civil servant
- Jens Scharping (born 1974), German footballer
- Jens Scheer (1935–1994), German physicist
- Jens Scheuer (born 1978), German football manager
- Jens Schive (1900–1962), Norwegian journalist and diplomat
- Jens Schmidt (born 1981), Germany international rugby union player
- Jens Schmidt (footballer) (born 1963), German footballer
- Jens Schöngarth (born 1988), German handball player
- Jens Schoor (born 1987), German squash player
- Jens Schreiber (born 1982), German swimmer
- Jens Fredrik Schroeter (1857–1927), Norwegian astronomer
- Jens Schuermans (born 1993), Belgian mountain biker
- Jens Schulte-Bockum (born 1966), German businessman
- Jens Arup Seip (1905–1992), Norwegian historian
- Jens Seipenbusch (born 1968), German politician
- Jens Selmer (1845–1928), Norwegian actor
- Jens Sigsgaard (1910–1991), Danish psychologist and writer
- Jens Pauli Skaalum (1893–1978), Faroese politician
- Jens Skålberg (born 1985), Swedish ice hockey player
- Jens Martin Skibsted (born 1970), Danish designer, entrepreneur and author
- Jens Edvin A. Skoghøy (born 1955), Norwegian judge
- Jens Kristian Skogmo (born 1987), Norwegian footballer
- Jens Christian Skou (1918–2018), Danish chemist
- Jens Schielderup Sneedorff (1724–1764), Danish writer
- Jens van Son (born 1987), Dutch footballer
- Jens Søndergaard (1895–1957), Danish expressionist painter
- Jens Sønderup (1894–1978), Danish politician
- Jens Sørensen (canoeist) (born 1949), Danish sprint canoer
- Jens Sørensen (cyclist) (1941–2020), Danish cyclist
- Jens Söring (born 1966), German convicted murderer
- Jens Spahn (born 1980), German politician
- Jens Sparschuh (born 1955), German writer
- Jens Christian Spidberg (1684–1762), Norwegian bishop and natural scientist
- Jens Jørn Spottag (born 1957), Danish actor
- Jens Henrik Beer Sr. (1731–1808), Norwegian politician
- Jens Stage (born 1996), Danish footballer
- Jens Petter Stang (born 1977), Norwegian footballer
- Jens Stefenson (1895–1986), Swedish naval officer and diver
- Jens Olai Steffensen (1891–1961), Norwegian politician
- Jens Steffensen (born 1950), Danish footballer
- Jens Stegemann (born 1971), German canoeist
- Jens Steinigen (born 1966), German biathlete
- Jens Sterri (1923–2008), Norwegian civil servant
- Jens Stoltenberg (born 1959), Norwegian politician
- Jens Stoud (1719–1768), Norwegian government official
- Jens Jurn Streutker (born 1993), Dutch footballer
- Jens Stryger (born 1991), Danish footballer
- Jens Stub (1764–1819), Norwegian politician
- Jens Christian Svabo (1746–1824), Faroese linguist, scholar and ethnographer
- Jens Arne Svartedal (born 1976), Norwegian cross-country skier

== T ==
- Jens Frølich Tandberg (1852–1922), Norwegian bishop
- Jens Tangen (1897–1980), Norwegian trade unionist
- Jens Teunckens (born 1998), Belgian footballer
- Jens Teutrine (born 1993), German politician
- Jens Thiis (1870–1942), Norwegian art historian, conservator and museum director
- Jens Thoben (born 1976), German clarinetist
- Jens Jakob Thomasen (born 1996), Danish footballer
- Jens Thorén, Swedish player of Magic: The Gathering
- Jens Jørgen Thorsen (1932–2000), Danish artist, director, and jazz musician
- Jens Kristian Thune (1935–2018), Norwegian jurist
- Jens Timmermann (born 1970), German philosopher
- Jens Todt (born 1970), German former professional footballer
- Jens Henrik Tönjum (born 1995), Swedish-born Norwegian ice hockey player
- Jens Toornstra (born 1989), Dutch footballer
- Jens Torstensen (1928–2003), Danish footballer
- Jens Peter Trap (1810–1885), Danish royal cabinet secretary and topographic writer
- Jens Truckenbrod (born 1980), German footballer
- Jens Tschiedel (born 1968), German footballer
- Jens Levin Tvede (1830–1891), Danish destiller and politician
- Jens Tvedt (1857–1935), Norwegian writer
- Jens Jacob Tychsen (born 1975), Danish actor

== U ==
- Jens Ulltveit-Moe (born 1942), Norwegian businessperson

== V ==
- Jens Vahl (1796–1854), Danish botanist
- Jens Johan Vangensten (1766–1837), Norwegian farmer and politician
- Jens Veggerby (born 1962), Danish cyclist
- Jens Peter Vernersen (1947–2025), Danish politician
- Jens Vilhelmsen (born 1985), Danish rower
- Jens Vogt (1830–1892), Norwegian businessman
- Jens Voigt (born 1971), German road bicycle racer and cycling broadcaster
- Jens Volkmann (born 1967), German middle-distance runner
- Jens Vorsatz (born 1971), German slalom canoer

== W ==
- Jens Wahl (born 1966), German former footballer
- Jens Wallays (born 1992), Belgian cyclist
- Jens Sörensen Wand (1875–1950), Danish bird warden on Norderoog
- Jens Ernst Wegener (1781–1846), Danish educator and pedagogical writer
- Jens Weidmann (born 1968), German economist
- Jens Weißflog (born 1964), German former ski jumper
- Jens Wemmer (born 1985), German footballer
- Jens Wendelboe (born 1956), Norwegian trombonist, composer, and orchestra leader
- Jens Werner (1964–2024), Danish ballroom dancer
- Jens Werrmann (born 1985), German hurdler
- Jens Westemeier (born 1966), German historian and author
- Jens Westengard (1871–1918), American lawyer
- Jens Westin (born 1989), Swedish ice hockey player
- Jens Westphalen (born 1964), German wildlife filmmaker, director and film producer
- Jens Winter (born 1965), German film and theatre actor of British descent
- Jens Winther (1960–2011), Danish jazz musician
- Jens Wisløff (1921–1998), Norwegian politician
- Jens Wissing (born 1988), German footballer
- Jens Wöhrmann (born 1967), German tennis player
- Jens Jacob Asmussen Worsaae (1821–1885), Danish archaeologist, historian and politician
- Jens van 't Wout (born 2001), Dutch speed skater

== Z ==
- Jens Zemke (born 1966), German cyclist
- Jens Zetlitz (1761–1821), Norwegian priest and poet
- Jens Zimmermann (host) (born 1972), German sport announcer
- Jens Zimmermann (philosopher) (born 1965), Canadian philosopher
- Jens Zimmermann (politician) (born 1981), German politician
- Jens Zimmermann (sport shooter) (born 1967), German sports shooter

== See also ==
- Jens (disambiguation)
- Jens (surname)
