= Jens Gieseke =

Jens Gieseke may refer to:

- Jens Gieseke (historian)
- Jens Gieseke (politician)
