= Jens Christensen =

Jens Christensen may refer to:

- Jens Christensen (bishop) (1899–1966), Danish Lutheran missionary and bishop
- Jens Peter Christensen (born 1956), Danish judge
- Jens Christensen (sailor) (born 1953), Danish sailor
- Jens Christian Christensen (1856–1930), Danish politician
- Harald Christensen (wrestler) (Jens Harald Christensen, 1884–1959), Danish wrestler
