= Seidenbusch =

Seidenbusch is a German surname and may refer to

- Johann Georg Seidenbusch (1641–1729), Bavarian priest
- Rupert Seidenbusch (1830–1895), German-American priest

== See also ==
- Seipenbusch
