= Jens =

Jens may refer to:

- Jens (given name), a list of people with the name
- Jens (surname), a list of people
- Jens, Switzerland, a municipality
- 1719 Jens, an asteroid

== See also ==
- Jensen (disambiguation)
- Jenssi
