= Katherine Bacon =

English pianist

- Born: 2 June 1896; Chesterfield, Derbyshire, England
- Died: 6 January 1982 (aged 85); New York City, U.S.
- Occupation: Classical pianist

Katherine Bacon (2 June 1896 – 30 January 1982) was an English classical pianist and faculty member of the Juilliard School of Music. She was born in Chesterfield, Derbyshire, England, and died in New York, New York, United States.

== Biography ==
When Bacon was aged four, she began studying piano with a family friend. When she was nine, she began studying more seriously piano and harmony with a local professor, and two years later, she began studying with English pianist Arthur Newstead, and followed him to Peabody Conservatory of Music, when he became part of their faculty. After Bacon graduated and completed her degree, she married Newstead on 29 May 1916 in Annapolis, Maryland. In 1917, she had her daughter Joan, and her husband soon accepted a teaching position at the Institute of Musical Art (which is now known as the Juilliard School of Music).

Bacon quickly became recognized as an outstanding young pianist after her debut in 1920. She soon performed in many solo recitals as well as with orchestras such as the New York Philharmonic, the Toronto Symphony, and the Baltimore Symphony. From 1921 to 1929, Bacon taught at the Mannes School of Music, and she was a faculty member of the Juilliard School of Music from 1940 to 1972, when she retired. She directed the piano department of the Chautauqua School of Music for a short time in 1955. Bacon toured institutions across the United States from 1930 to 1968, partaking in the Association of American Colleges Arts Program, and toured Japan, Korea, and Hong Kong in 1966. She was noted for her "gracious," "natural," and "convincing" performance in every style.

Notable performances include her 1927 performance of the 32 Beethoven piano sonatas at Aeolian Hall to commemorate the Beethoven Centenary, her 1928 performances of Franz Schubert's works to commemorate his centenary, and another performance of the Beethoven piano sonatas at The Town Hall in 1939 and 1940. Notable students of hers include Stanley Waldoff, Saul Braverman, Dubrazka Tomsic, and Jens Nygaard.
