= Jens Jensen =

Jens Jensen may refer to:

- Jens Jensen (footballer) (1890–1957), Danish football (soccer) player who played one game for the Denmark national football team
- Jens Jensen (landscape architect) (1860–1951), Danish-born landscape architect in Chicago, Illinois
- Jens Jensen (politician) (1865–1936), Australian politician
- Jens Jensen (runner) (born 1903), American steeplechase runner, 4th at the 1924 United States Olympic trials (track and field)
- Jens Jensen (trade unionist) (1859–1928), Danish trade unionist and Social Democratic politician
- Jens Berendt Jensen (born 1940), Danish Olympic rower
- Jens Christian Jensen (1928–2013), German art historian and curator
- Jens Jensen-Egeberg (1848–1922), Danish painter
- Jens Kristian Jensen (1885–1956), Danish gymnast and Olympic medalist
- Jens Martin Arctander Jenssen (1885–1968), Norwegian politician
- Jens S. Jensen (1946–2015), Swedish photographer and writer

== See also ==
- Jens Book-Jenssen (1910–1999), Norwegian singer, songwriter, revue artist, and theatre director
