= Jens Andersen =

Jens Andersen may refer to:

- Jens Andersen Lodehat (died 1431), Danish bishop
- Jens Andersen Beldenak (died 1537), Danish bishop
- Jens Banzon Hee Andersen (1820–1892), Danish farmer
- Jens Mathias Bollerup Andersen (1822–1868), Danish politician
- Jens Andersen (businessman) (1866–1937), Norwegian shoemaker and businessperson
- Jens Andersen (writer) (born 1955), Danish writer
- Jens Andersen (actor) (born 1971), Danish actor
- Jens Andersen (boxer) (1929–2010), Danish boxer
