= Jens Lehmann (disambiguation) =

Jens Lehmann is a German footballer.

It may also refer to:

- Jens Lehmann (cyclist) (born 1967), German cyclist and politician
- Jens Lehmann (scientist) (born 1982), German scientist
