= Bangsbo =

Bangsbo is a surname. Notable people with the surname include:

- Jens Bangsbo (born 1957), Danish professor of physiology
- Johan Bångsbo (born 2003), Swedish footballer

== See also ==
- Vagn Bangsborg (born 1936), Danish cyclist
