= 9 to 5: Days in Porn =

2008 film

- Theatrical poster
- Directed by: Jens Hoffmann
- Written by: Jens Hoffmann
- Produced by: Cleonice Comino
- Starring: Otto Bauer; Audrey Hollander; Belladonna
- Cinematography: Jens Hoffmann
- Edited by: Christopher Klotz; Kai Schröter
- Music by: Alex McGowan; Michael Meinl
- Production company: F24 Film
- Distributed by: Media Entertainment GmbH (theatrical); Strand Releasing (DVD release)
- Release dates: 24 August 2008 (Montreal); 10 March 2009 (Miami IFF)
- Running time: 95 minutes
- Country: Germany
- Languages: English; German

9 to 5: Days in Porn, also known as The Porn Diaries (UK), is a 2008 English-language German documentary film about the United States porn industry, written and directed by Jens Hoffmann.

== Cast ==
See List

== Production ==
The documentary took five years to produce, with over three years of filming. Through interviews with 77 persons, the film profiles 10 different members of the U.S. porn industry in the San Fernando Valley, where 80% of American pornography films are produced. While focusing on the actors, the documentary also covers individuals involved in production.

== Interviews ==
Among the film's many interviewees are 2006 AVN Award winner Audrey Hollander, former porn star and Director of the Adult Industry Medical Health Care Foundation Dr. Sharon Mitchell, stripper-turned-porn star/director Belladonna, as well as Katja Kassin, Otto Bauer, Sasha Grey, Nina Hartley, John Stagliano, Roxy Deville, Mia Rose, and filmmaker Jim Powers.

== Release ==
The documentary premiered at the Montreal World Film Festival on August 24, 2008. It was later shown in Duisburg, Germany during Film Week on November 3, 2008. It showed in February 2009 in Berlin, Germany. It then screened in March 2009 at the Miami International Film Festival and the Buenos Aires International Festival of Independent Cinema in March, and in June at the Bellaria Film Festival, in Bellaria, Italy.

== Reception ==
Matt Prigge of Philadelphia Weekly wrote that while the documentary "deserves credit for trying to find as many angles from which to look at an industry as successful as it is loathed", it dealt too much with "vacuous porn star confessionals", its scope was too wide, the film lacked organization, and that "its take on the biz sometimes seems less complex than schizophrenic."

Conversely, Cameron McGaughy of DVD Talk wrote that whether "you're a porn addict, a lover of revealing documentaries or just a curious voyeur, you certainly won't be bored with these 100 minutes." He felt that director Hoffman kept enough distance from the subject matter to allow viewers to decide for themselves. McGaughy was "surprisingly pleased with Hoffmann's effort", summarising that the film was "amusing, brutal, candid, honest, hysterical and heartbreaking" and that porn aficionados will find themselves "entertained and enlightened".

Daniel Bickermann of Schnitt praised the film, writing "Hoffmanns großes und wichtiges Verdienst ist es dabei, beide Seiten parallel zu zeigen, nie zu urteilen und dabei trotzdem immer echte Sympathie für seine Figuren zu beweisen. So entstehen einige Momente reinster Dokumentarmagie" ("Hoffmann's great and important merit is to show both sides in parallel, never judging, while still demonstrating genuine sympathy for his characters. This results in some moments of pure documentary magic").

The JoBlo offered that he expected either a "gritty, highly-critical depiction of the porn industry, or a cheap, sexy fluff-piece produced and promoted by the porn industry." In admitting he was wrong in his original expectation, he wrote, "Amazingly, director Jens Hoffman crafts a surprisingly objective film, one that shows both the ups and downs of an industry that contains plenty of them, while avoiding ever preaching to either side."

The Express offered "Hoffmanns Dokumentation wurde auf vielen Filmfestivals gefeiert, erhielt sogar eine Nominierung für den Deutschen Kamerapreis. Und die Kritiker sind sich einig: Der Regisseur porträtiert sensibel und intim, ohne schlüpfrig und voyeuristisch zu werden." ("Hoffmann's documentary was celebrated at many film festivals, even received a nomination for the German Camera. And the critics agree: The director is portraying sensitively and intimately, without becoming lewd and voyeuristic.")

N24 offered "Hoffmann interessiert nicht die milliardenschwere Industrie, die dahinter steckt, ihn interessieren die Leute hinter und vor der Kamera. Er kommt den Akteuren nahe, die Szenen sind intim, aber nie voyeuristisch.". ("Hoffmann is not interested in the billion-dollar industry that is behind it, he is interested in the people behind and in front of the camera. He gets close to the actors, the scenes are intimate, but never voyeuristic.")
