= Hovdala Castle =

Castle in Scania, Sweden

- Hovdala slott
- Hässleholm Municipality
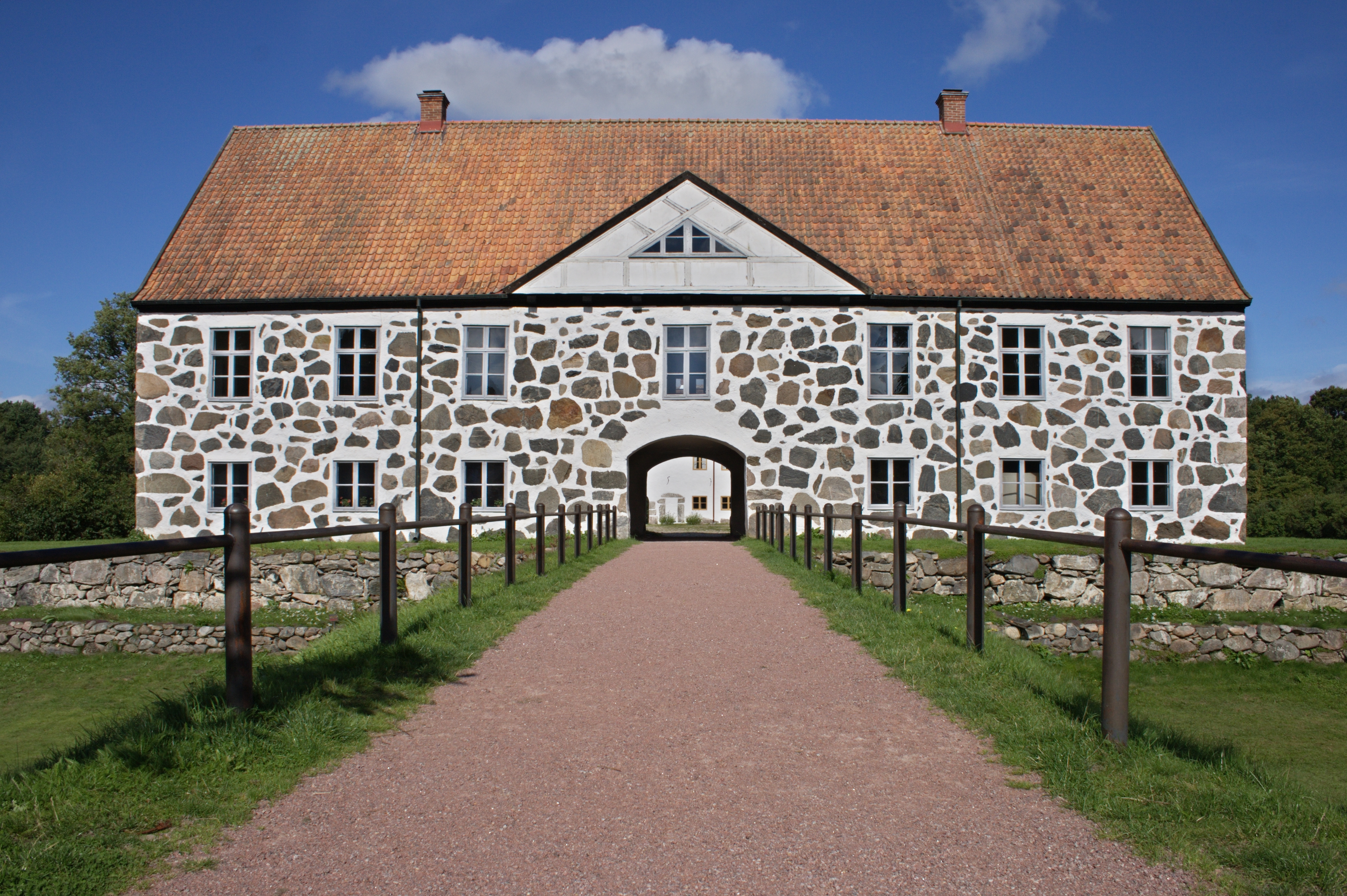
- Hovdala Castle

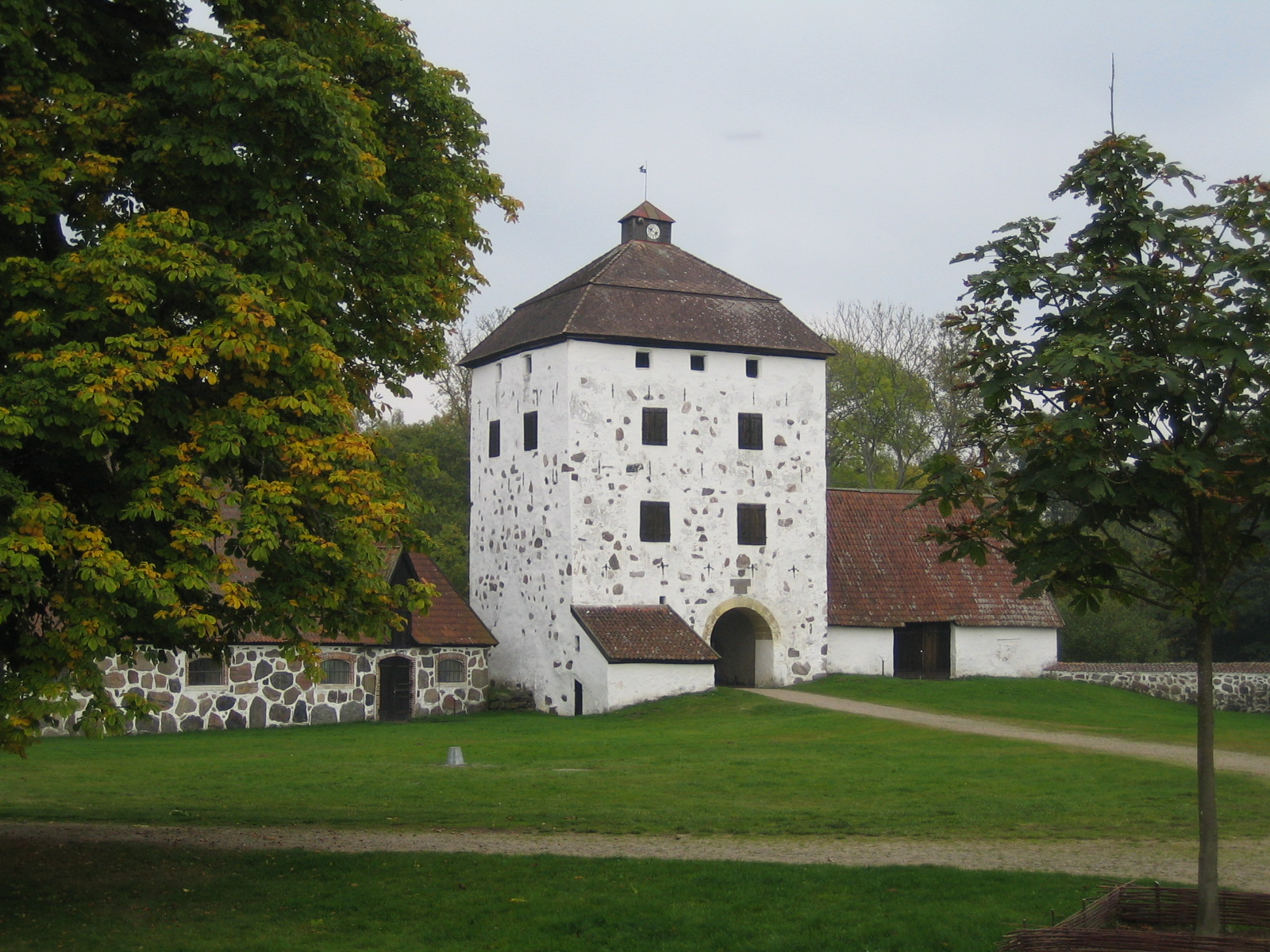
- Gate tower

Site information
- Type: Castle
- Owner: National Property Board of Sweden
- Open to the public: Yes

Location
- Scania, Sweden Hovdala Castle (Sweden)
- Coordinates: 56.104444°N 13.7125°E

Site history
- Built: 16th century
- Battles/wars: Kalmar War; Scanian War

Hovdala Castle (Swedish: Hovdala slott) is a castle in Hässleholm Municipality, Scania, in southern Sweden. Its oldest visible parts date from the early 16th century although the original construction dates back to at least the early 12th century.

== History ==
Hovdala was mentioned for the first time in 1130, but the buildings that visitors can see today were mainly constructed during the early 16th century. The date 1511 can be read on one of the façades. Back then, Scania was part of Denmark. The castle name was written 'Howdale' in the mid 17th-century.

The squire Magnus Rabek is mentioned in written sources as having owned the estate sometime before the Black Death. During the early 15th century, the estate belonged to a squire named Klement Skaldra. At the end of the century, the estate passed to the Laxmand family, who erected the oldest of the presently visible buildings. Through marriage it later passed to the Grubbe family. During the ownership of Sigvard Grubbe, an educated man who stood close to the king, Christian IV of Denmark, and who had studied in Wittenberg and Basel, the castle was besieged twice by Swedish troops during the Kalmar War. The castle withstood the sieges.

After the death of Sigvard Grubbe, the castle passed between different owners until it became the property of Jens Mikkelsen (Michelsen), an officer in the Danish army, in 1651. After the conquest of Scania by Sweden in 1658, he chose to stay on in Scania and had to resign public office in Denmark. He had previously served with the Danish chancellor of the Exchequer in Copenhagen. Mikkelsen, like all other Scanians who chose to pledge faith to the Swedish king and stay on, now became a Swedish subject. During the Scanian War of 1676-1679, Mikkelsen found himself in a difficult situation. Scania became a no man's land where the Danes ruled one day and the Swedes the next. Mikkelsen was reported to the Danes as a Swedish spy in the summer of 1677, but then he went to the Danish Army Camp outside Malmö and reported about the latest Swedish troop movements in northern Scania and denounced the Swedish commander Johan Gyllenstjerna's cruel methods. Reports of this can be found in the Danish National Archives. He also applied for a salva guardie certificate that would spare his estate from Danish attacks. According to family tradition, Mikkelsen considered returning to Denmark at the time. Nevertheless, the castle was assaulted, pillaged and burnt by pro-Danish guerilla fighters on 7 August 1678.

Mikkelsen survived the ordeal and was later ennobled by the Swedish king, and took the name Ehrenborg. The castle stayed in the Ehrenborg family until 1944, when it was expropriated by the Swedish state. The last owners were allowed to keep living in the castle and did not move out until 1981.

From 1944, the former land of the estate was used as a military training field. Today the land belongs to Hässleholm municipality.

A renovation of the castle was initiated in 1993. In 2004, the renovation project was awarded the Europa Nostra award for "sensitive and intelligent restoration work." In 2022, part of the land surrounding the castle was turned into a nature reserve.

== Architecture ==
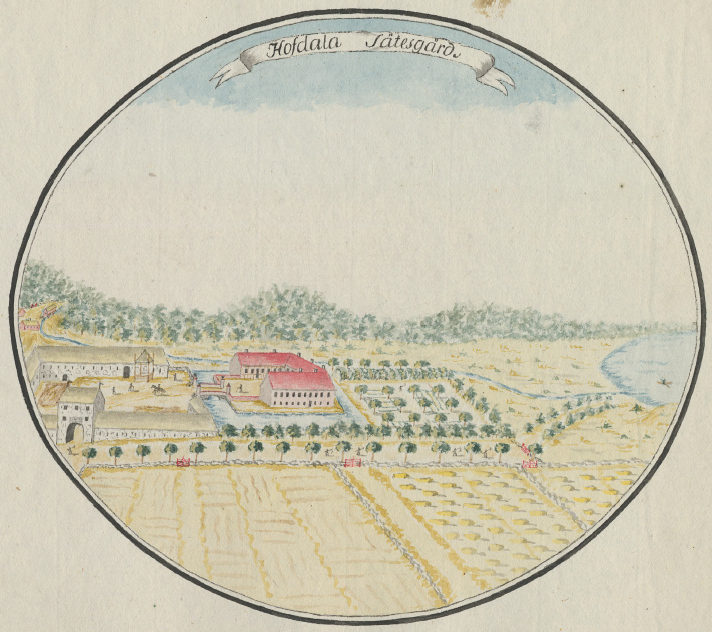
A depiction of the castle from circa 1780

The castle complex consists of three buildings placed in a u-shape around a courtyard. To the north lies the oldest building, from the early 16th century, possibly 1511 as is stated on its façade. To the east, a building from 1681-82 housed the living quarters, replacing an older building, destroyed during the Scanian War. To the south lies the most recent building, dating back to 1805. A fourth building formally existed to the west, closing off the courtyard, but no traces of if remain. The castle used to be surrounded by a moat and a drawbridge, but this has since dried out and only a dip in the land remains. South of the castle lies a defensive tower, erected in the year 1600, which has withstood both battles the castle has been involved in. A stone plaque on the tower bears the date 1633, commemorating the 1612 siege by Swedish troops. The main, representative rooms of the former living quarters have been restored, including the family library, and are open to the public via guided tours. The historical environment displayed represents that of the upper middle classes or lower aristocracy, rather than the higher echelons of Danish/Swedish aristocracy or the working class.

In 2009, the municipal library of Hässleholm received a donation of about 3,500 books, mainly about the history of the district in which Hovdala Castle is located. They were donated by the former ambassador, minister without portfolio and Social democratic politician Sven-Eric Nilsson. The books are today housed in one of the annexes to Hovdala Castle.

== Grounds ==
The landscape surrounding Hovdala Castle is largely rural, with a mix of forests, fields, lakes and creeks. The castle used to feature a park or garden laid out in French style, but it stopped being maintained due to a lack of resources. A kitchen garden and an orangery from 1763 remain to the north of the castle.

Three distinct areas in the castle's surroundings are included in a nature reserve: the forests south of Hovdala castle, Dalleröd and Solhem-Björkviken by Lake Finjasjön. 18 of Sweden’s 19 bat species can be found here, including the Bechstein's bat, a rare species in Sweden. A small population of freshwater pearl mussels, an endangered species, can be found in the Hovdalaån, a small river by the castle.

== See also ==
- List of castles in Sweden
