= Jens (surname) =

Jens is a surname which may refer to:

- Anna Jens (1766–1815), Dutch East Indies coffee plantation owner
- Elizabeth Jens (born 1984), Australian NASA propulsion engineer
- Ellen Jens, Dutch television director and producer
- João Jens (born 1944), Brazilian volleyball player
- Salome Jens (born 1935), American actress
- Walter Jens (1923–2013), German philologist, literature historian, critic, university professor and writer

== See also ==
- Jens (given name)
