= Bernd Jakubowski =

East German footballer (1952–2007)

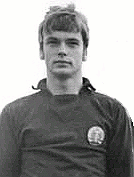
- Jakubowski in 1971

Personal information
- Full name: Bernd Jakubowski
- Date of birth: 10 December 1952
- Place of birth: Rostock, East Germany
- Date of death: 25 July 2007 (aged 54)
- Place of death: Dresden, Germany
- Height: 1.88 m (6 ft 2 in)
- Position: Goalkeeper

Youth career
- 1961–1970: Hansa Rostock

Senior career*
Years	Team	Apps	(Gls)
1970–1971	Hansa Rostock II		
1971–1976	Hansa Rostock	36+	(0)
1976–1986	Dynamo Dresden	183	(0)
1986–1987	Dynamo Dresden II		

International career
1980	East Germany Olympic	1	(0)

Managerial career
- 1989: Dynamo Dresden II
- 1989: TSG Meißen
Medal record
Men's football
Representing East Germany
Olympic Games
Silver medal – second place	1980 Moscow	Team
- * Club domestic league appearances and goals

Bernd Jakubowski (10 December 1952 – 25 July 2007) was an East German footballer who played as a goalkeeper.

== Career ==
Jakubowski began his career with Hansa Rostock, but moved to Dynamo Dresden in 1970, where he would spend the remainder of his career. His move to Dresden was allegedly not entirely voluntary. He allegedly had to choose between military service or playing for Dynamo Dresden. Initially he was the reserve keeper in Dresden, understudying Claus Boden, but he eventually took over the number 1 shirt, and he went on to play 183 games in the DDR-Oberliga, and 31 more in Europe.

The bitterest moment of Jakubowski's career was perhaps a Cup Winners' Cup tie against western neighbours Bayer Uerdingen. Dynamo were leading in the first half, but a tackle from Wolfgang Funkel caused Jakubowski to be taken off with injury. His replacement, Jens Ramme, conceded six goals in the second half, and Dynamo were out.

Jakubowski won the silver medal as part of the East German team at the 1980 Olympics. He wasn't the first choice goalkeeper but played one match in the group stage during the Moscow Games.

After his retirement he continued to work for Dynamo Dresden in various roles, including Director of Football and Assistant Manager. He died in 2007 in Dresden.
