= Johannes Holbek =

Danish painter and graphic artist

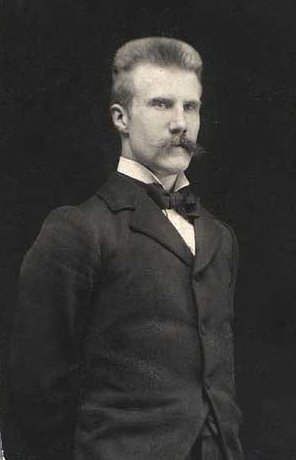
Johannes Holbek, from Det Kongelige Bibliotek

Johannes Holbek (13 November 1872, in Årby, near Kalundborg – 14 May 1903, in Copenhagen) was a Danish painter and graphic artist.

== Biography ==
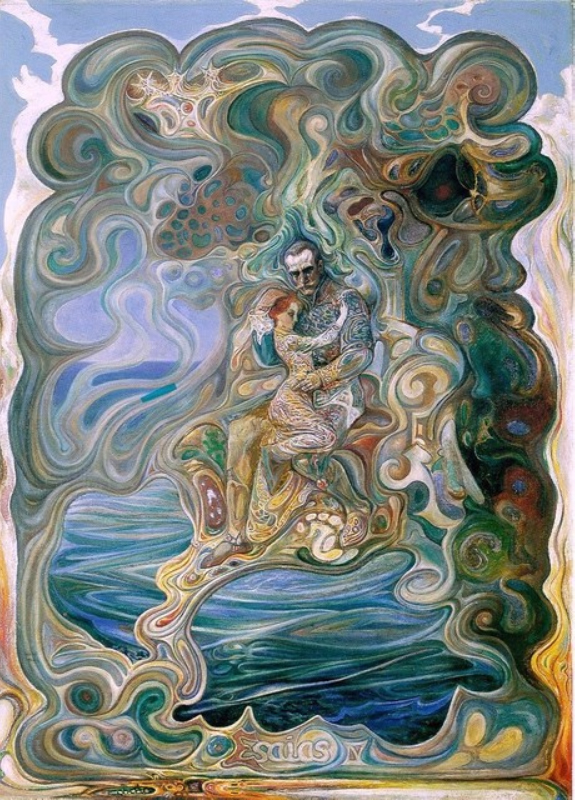
Jesaya (Esaias Tegnér)

His father was a parish priest. He graduated from the Roskilde Cathedral School in 1891 and was admitted to the Copenhagen Technical College the following year, where he studied with the artist, Holger Grønvold. In 1893, he spent one semester at the Royal Danish Academy of Fine Arts with Frederik Vermehren. That same year, he was influenced by an exhibition at Den Frie Udstilling, featuring the works of Van Gogh and Gauguin.

As a result, he made several visits to Paris and Brittany and, from 1901 to 1902, studied at the École des Beaux-Arts with Jean-Léon Gérôme and Gustave Moreau, who was especially important to the development of his style. He also spent some time in the workshops of Fernand Cormon and illustrated Enoch Arden by Tennyson.

Upon returning home, he provided cartoons for the newspapers København and Politiken, but his paintings were rejected by Den Frie Udstilling and the Charlottenborg Spring Exhibition. An attempt to find employment at the Fliegende Blätter was also unsuccessful.

During this time, he illustrated and wrote the text for two works; Omkring Midlet (About the Means) and Dekadent Barbari (Decadent Barbarism), which were published posthumously by his friend, Jens Lund. They consist of mostly satirical stories that have been cited as an influence on the works of Robert Storm Petersen.

In 1903, he was unexpectedly dismissed from Politiken. He had been intensively involved with the creation of a set of books that would summarize his life and philosophy, and was already overworked, so this new setback precipitated a physical and mental breakdown. He was admitted to Copenhagen Municipal Hospital and died there a few days later, of unspecified causes.

A memorial exhibition was held at Den Frie Udstilling in 1904. Asger Jorn was an admirer of his works and many of them may be seen at the Museum Jorn, Silkeborg.

== Selected works ==
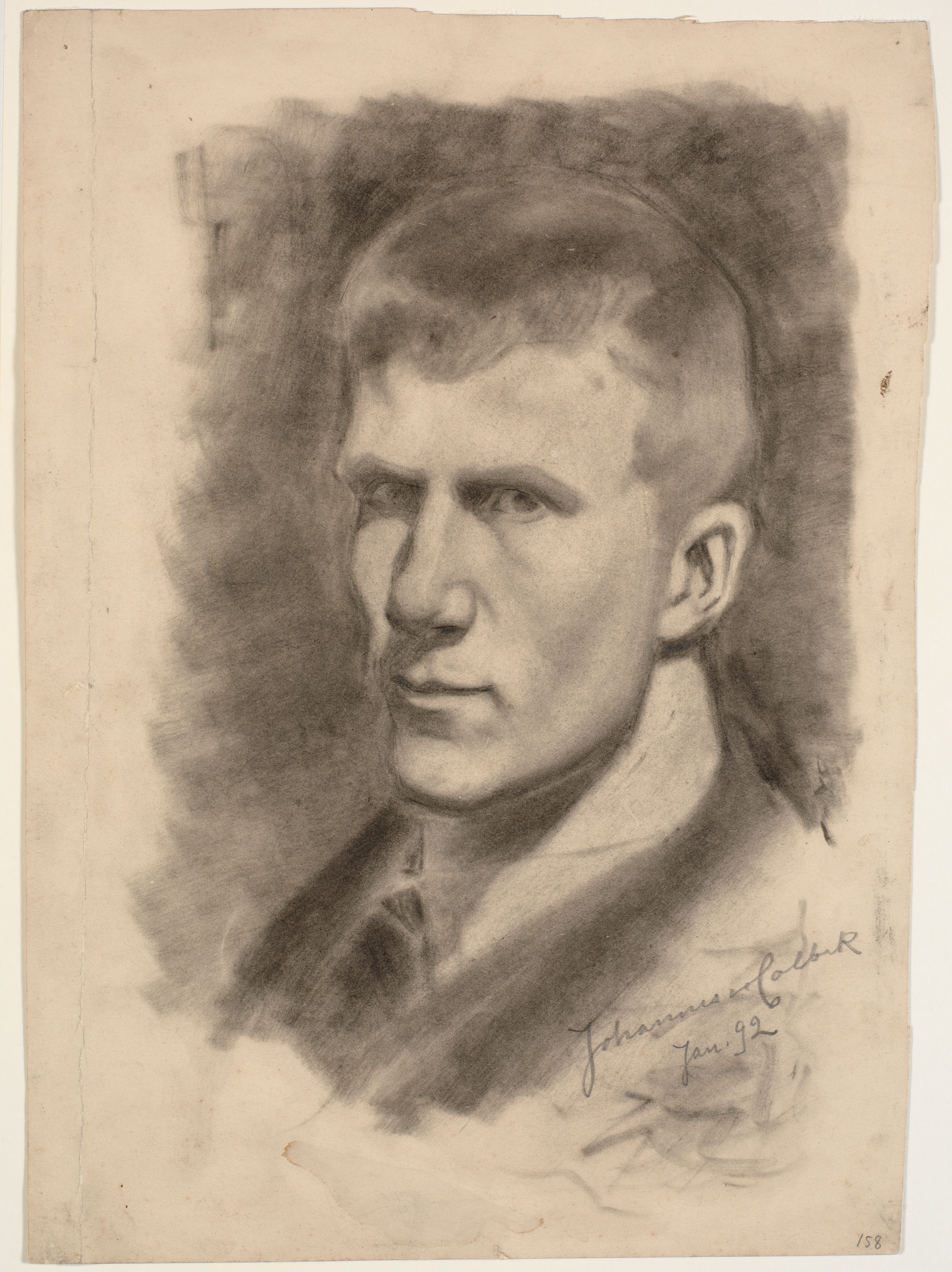
Self-portrait

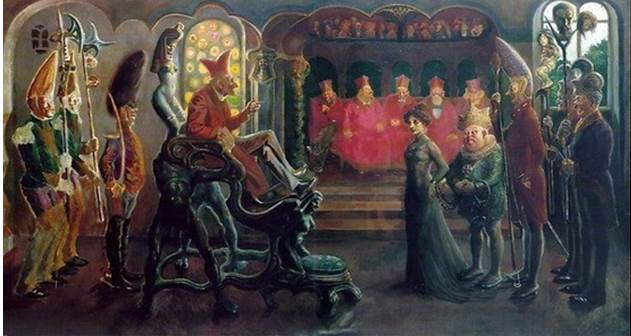
The Laugh Council

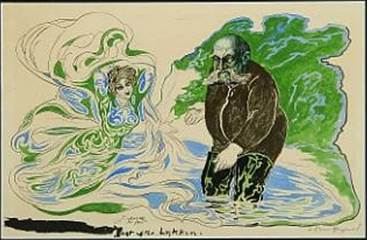
The Hunt for Happiness

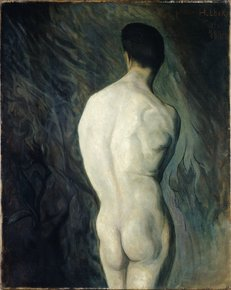
The Plant
