= Jens Mikkelsen Ehrenborg =

Danish soldier and public servant (1621–1690)

Jens Mikkelsen Ehrenborg (1621 – 1690) was a Danish soldier and public servant who later became a Swedish nobleman. He was born in 1621 in Fredericia in southern Jutland in Denmark. His name was also spelled Jöns Michelsson, Jens Michelsen or Jöns Michaelson. Upon his ennoblement in 1687, he was given the surname Ehrenborg.

In his youth, Mikkelsen served as an officer in the Danish army and later he worked in the Chancellor of the Exchequer's offices in Copenhagen and he was a faithful servant to King Christian IV. At around this time, Mikkelsen rented an estate called Spannerup (now Spannarp) in the eastern province of Scania (Skåne). According to family tradition, he rented or bought Howdale (now Hovdala) Castle in Scania in 1654, although he maintained certain rights to Spannerup until he sold all rights to the Swedish Governor General Gustav Otto Stenbock in 1663. He also had burgher rights in Helsinborg for some years but in 1665 he obtained the rights of a nobleman to own Howdale.

In 1658, Scania was ceded to Sweden following the Treaty of Roskilde and all inhabitants who wanted to remain in the province had to resign their positions in Denmark. Jens Mikkelsen chose to stay in Scania and swore his oath of fealty to king Charles X Gustav on 15 May 1658. In 1670 he was appointed a seat on the commission that would revise the taxation system in Scania.

== The Scanian War ==
During the Scanian War of 1676-1679, in which Denmark sought to re-take Scania, Mikkelsen and many other landowners and prominent men of Danish origin attempted to placate both the Swedish and the Danish kings. His daughter Anna Catharina had married a Swede called Martin Nordeman who was a professor at the University of Lund. Because of his Danish family connections, Nordeman was allowed to stay in Scania when the Danes came back, but in November 1676 he was arrested on the charge of espionage. He had employed two Swedish students to spy for the Swedes. Nordeman ended up in a Danish prison and was later sent to Sweden.

In June 1677, Mikkelsen was also reported to be a Swedish spy and he betook himself to the Danish army camp near Malmö to free himself from these accusations. He provided the Danes with detailed information about the Swedish army positions in northern Scania and also denounced the Swedish commander Johan Gyllenstjerna's cruel treatment of the Scanian peasantry. On 23 June 1677, Mikkelsen applied for a 'salva guardie' certificate that would salvage him and his estate from Danish attacks. According to family history, Mikkelsen was considering a return to Denmark proper at the time.

Howdale Castle had Swedish troops posted there in 1677, as part of the small war campaign that was being fought against the Danes. At this time, parts of Scania was a no man's land where Danes and Swedes fought ferocious small party warfare in which the snapphanar played an important part. Snapphane was a derogatory Swedish term used about pro-Danish guerilla soldiers, some of whom were mercenaries paid by Denmark, while others were peasants defending their homes against the devastation caused by warring factions, and yet others were bandits who used the war as a pretext to plunder civilians indiscriminately. Howedale Castle was attacked in August of 1678, by snapphane units including friskytter cavalry employed on a mercenary basis by the Danish crown. According to the Ehrenborg family tradition, it was Captain Severin and Lille Mads, both prominent friskytter, who led the troops that demanded access to the castle. Although the castle was looted and burnt, the Mikkelsen family and their servants saved themselves by escaping through a back door and across the moat. Ultimately, the order to attack the castle came from the Danish headquarters.

In the years following the end of the war, Mikkelsen had new buildings constructed to replace those that had been destroyed; only the tower guarding the entrance to the castle was saved.

== Later years ==
On 13 April 1687, Jens Mikkelsen was knighted by king Charles XI for his services to the Swedish crown, and he took the surname Ehrenborg. His eldest son, Richard Ehrenborg (1655-1700) became a professor of law at Lund university, and served as its chancellor in 1699-1700. A branch of the family, going back to Jens Ehrenborg's younger son Michael Ehrenborg (1659-1722), was elevated to baronial status in 1817, although that branch became extinct in 1930. In 1944, Hovdala castle became the property of the Swedish government, but descendants of Jens Mikkelsen Ehrenborg lived there until the early 1980s.
