= Jens Rydström =

Swedish historian (born 1955)

Jens Rydström (born 1955) is a Swedish historian and professor emeritus of gender studies at Lund University. His research centers on the intersections of sexuality, disability, queer theory, and the history of state regulation, activism, and lived experience in Northern Europe. He is known for his work on the history of homosexuality, sexual politics, disability rights, and queer activism in the Nordic countries.

== Academic career ==
Rydström earned his PhD in history at Stockholm University in 2001 with the dissertation Sinners and Citizens: Bestiality and Homosexuality in Sweden, 1880–1950, later published by the University of Chicago Press in 2003. He became a lecturer in gender studies at Lund University in 2008, was appointed docent in history in 2010, and was promoted to professor of gender studies in 2012. He is among the few men in Sweden to have achieved a professorship in gender studies.

== Publications (selected) ==
- Sex och Funktionshinder i Danmark och Sverige: Hur man hjälper och hur man stjälper (with Don Kulick). Lund: Studentlitteratur, 2021.
- Kvinnor, män och alla Andra: En svensk genushistoria. 2nd ed. (with David Tjeder.) Lund: Studentlitteratur, 2021.
- Undantagsmänniskor: En svensk HBTQ-historia med utblickar i världen. (with Svante Norrhem & Hanna Markusson Winkvist.) Lund: Studentlitteratur, 2015.
