= Jens Eriksson =

Swedish Ice hockey player (born 1984)

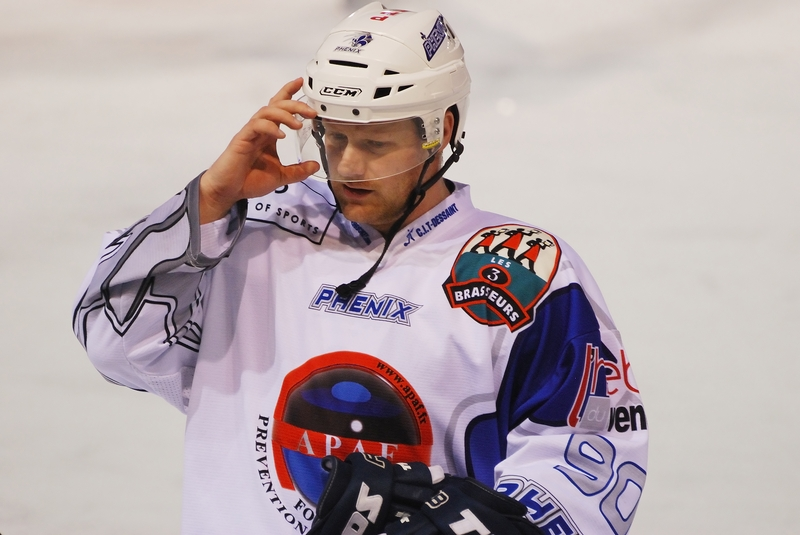
- Born: August 22, 1984 (age 41) Västerås, Sweden
- Height: 5 ft 10 in (178 cm)
- Weight: 194 lb (88 kg; 13 st 12 lb)
- Position: Forward
- Shoots: Right
- NHL draft: Undrafted
- Playing career: 1999–present

Jens Eriksson (born August 22, 1984) is a Swedish Ice hockey player, currently playing for Guildford Flames of the English Premier Ice Hockey League.
