= Jens Rusk =

Danish clergyman (died 1611)

Jens Hansen Rusk (died 1611) was a Danish clergyman who was executed for witchcraft in Ribe, Denmark. The court protocol of the city of Ribe in the 1572–1652 period is the most well preserved of all documents describing the witch trials in Denmark, and has been a focus of study for the Danish witch trials. He was a rare case of the execution of a man for witchcraft in Denmark, where mostly women were executed for this crime.

== Case ==
Jens Rusk was appointed the Lutheran vicar of Lønne Kirke in Lønne Sogn in 1580. He was the vicar of a poor parish and described as a pauper priest.

During the Ribe witch trials of 1610, Gunder Brixes was burned for having used a wax doll to kill Lauge Pedersen i Hostrup. Shortly before her execution on 17 July 1610, she named Jens Rusk as a sorcerer and testified that he, in his capacity of a priest, had baptised the wax doll she had used to bewitch her victim. In this time period, sacred objects such as the altar and the sacramental bread were believed to be used to perform magic, and priests were therefore sometimes in danger of being suspected to assist witches.

In September, Jens Rusk was arrested and formally charged for the crime of witchcraft. Witnesses testified that Rusk had used sorcery to cure the sick. One man claimed that Rusk had given him an amulet to protect him from illness, and this was confirmed by another witness. Rusk was interrogated and asked if he had abused his office by using witchcraft. Bishop Peder Hegelund himself visited Jens Rusk during his imprisonment.

Jens Rusk was ultimately sentenced guilty as charged to execution by burning, a sentence that was confirmed by a higher court and carried out. In Denmark, it was uncommon for men to be executed for sorcery.
