= Jens Gustafson (footballer, born 1973) =

Swedish footballer

Jens Gustafson von Zeipel
Personal information
- Full name: Jens Emanuel Gustafson von Zeipel
- Date of birth: 3 April 1973 (age 53)
- Place of birth: Stockholm, Sweden
- Height: 1.78 m (5 ft 10 in)
- Position: Midfielder

Senior career*
Years	Team	Apps	(Gls)
1992–2000	Hammarby IF	219	(28)
2001–2003	Enköpings SK		

International career
1994–1995	Sweden U21	10	(0)
- * Club domestic league appearances and goals

Jens Gustafson von Zeipel (born 3 April 1973) is a Swedish former professional footballer who played as a midfielder, best known for representing Hammarby IF.

== Club career ==
=== Hammarby IF ===
Gustafson was promoted to the senior squad of Hammarby IF in 1992, at age 18, and soon established himself as a starter in Division 1, Sweden's second tier. He became known as a technically gifted left midfielder and set piece specialist.

In 1993, Gustafson played an integral part, together with keeper Per Fahlström and prolific goalscorer Hans Eskilsson, as Hammarby won Division 1. The club ultimately finished six points ahead of contender Vasalunds IF, an opponent that Gustafson scored against in a decisive 2–1 away win during the later stages of the season.

Back in Allsvenskan 1994, Hammarby finished 12th in the table, just above the relegation zone, but won the first Swedish Futsal Championship the same year. The following season, in 1995, Hammarby was relegated; pundits blamed manager Tommy Davidsson for opting to play a much to defensive style. However, Gustafson had established himself as a member of the Sweden national under-21 team, winning 10 caps in total.

Gustafson competed with Hammarby in Division 1 for the next two seasons, being a key player, before making a second comeback in Allsvenskan in 1998. Surprisingly, Hammarby finished 3rd in the table, just four points behind champions AIK.

He was a regular starter for Hammarby in Allsvenskan in both 1999 and 2000, with the club failing to produce any sort of challenge, finishing 10th and 8th in the table.

=== Enköpings SK ===
In 2001, Gustafson joined Enköpings SK, linking up with former teammate Peter Berggren. He played three seasons with the club, two in the second division and one in Allsvenskan, before retiring from professional football at the end of 2003.
