= Jens Oddershede =

Danish chemistry professor and academic (born 1945)

Jens Nørgaard Oddershede (born 19 August 1945) graduated in Chemistry and Physics from Aarhus University (Denmark) in 1970. In 1978 he was awarded a doctorate in quantum chemistry and in 1988 he became professor. In 2001, Jens Oddershede became the 6th Rector of University of Southern Denmark. Prior to that, he was dean of science and Engineering and professor of chemistry at the University of Southern Denmark for ten years. In the period 2002–2014, Oddershede was vice-chairman and, since 2005, chairman of Universities Denmark, which is the organisation of the Danish universities to enhance their cooperation, visibility and impact. Since 2014 he has been Chairman of The Danish Council for Research and Innovation Policy.

He has for many years acted as member and chairman of several boards on university politics, and in research councils, research parks and venture companies. His experience stems from his professional career as dean of Science and Engineering, as rector of University of Southern Denmark, and as chairman of several committees and boards related to the higher education sector. He is a recipient of the Latvian order, the Cross of Recognition.

Since 1971, Oddershede has published 188 papers in internationally reviewed publication channels. In his entire professional career, he has been publishing articles—also during the years he was actively involved in the management of the University of Southern Denmark. Thus, since 2010 he has published 11 articles. His research focuses on the application of electron structure theory for the calculation of properties of atoms and molecules. He has supervised four PhD studies and four postdoctoral studies. He has extensive experience in undergraduate and graduate teaching from his time as associate professor in chemistry—and since 1988 as professor. Furthermore, he has been a member and chairman of several national and international scientific bodies. Finally, he has been the leading figure in a number of prestigious projects such as The Lindoe Center for Applied Mathematics, The Maersk Mc-Kinney Moller Institute for Production Technology and Centre for Clinical Proteomics.
