= Jens Metzger =

German politician (born 1990)

Member of the Landtag of Baden-Württemberg
- Incumbent
- Assumed office 11 May 2026

Personal details
- Born: 1990 (age 35–36)
- Party: Alliance 90/The Greens (since 2019)

Jens Michael Metzger (born 1990) is a German politician who was elected member of the Landtag of Baden-Württemberg in 2026. He has been a municipal councillor of Tuttlingen since 2024.
