= Jens Klok =

Danish architect (1889–1974)

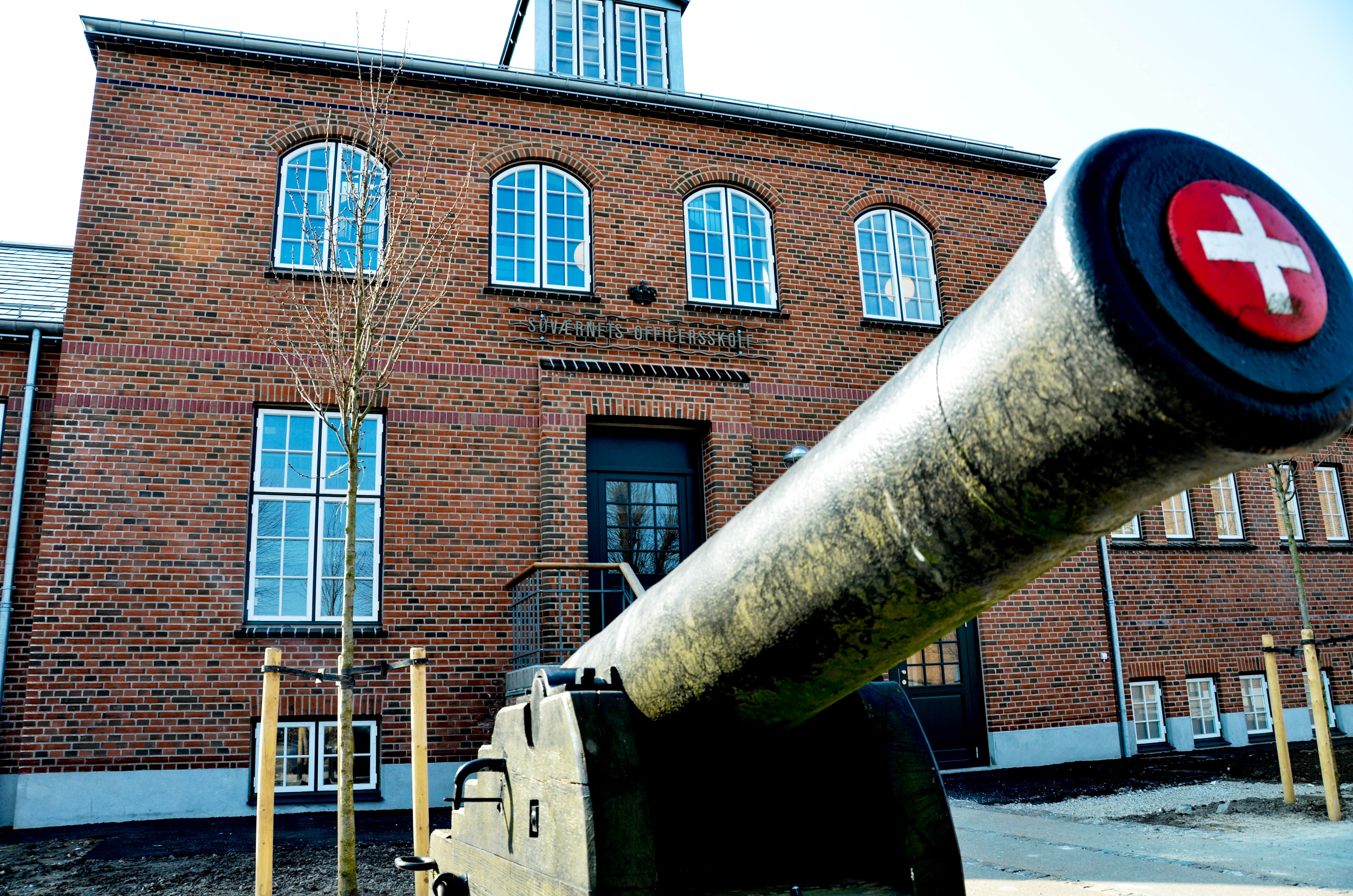
Royal Danish Naval Academy

Jens Christian Jensen Klok (25 January 1889 - June 16, 1974) was a Danish architect.

== Biography ==
Jens Klok was born at Vinderslev Parish in Viborg, Denmark. He was the son of Laurits Klok and Karoline Adolfsen. He was first a mason apprentice and a construction manager before going to technical school and the Royal Danish Academy of Fine Arts, School of Architecture, where he graduated in 1929. He received the Academy Bursary award in 1925 and K. A. Larssens Legat 1927 and travelled to Italy, France and England to study key architectural influences. As an employee at the Royal Danish Naval Building Service and from 1935 Head of the Naval Architecture section, he designed a number of Navy buildings in a unique style.

== Designs ==
Jens Klok designed the Marine Air Station in Avnsø in 1937 and in Holmen, Copenhagen in 1939. He later designed the Royal Danish Naval Academy office building in 1940, with Holger Sorensen, and had a special exhibition of his works at Charlottenborg Spring Exhibition between 1942 and 1943. He also designed the Motor Torpedo Workshop in 1953.

== Personal life ==
In 1932, he married Marie Augusta Elisabeth Bech (1887–1977). He died in Varde during 1974.

== Note ==
This biography is a translation of the Danish Wikipedia version that has additional references.
