= Jens Ramme =

German footballer (born 1963)

- Ramme with Dynamo Dresden in 1986

Personal information
- Date of birth: 2 August 1963 (age 63)
- Place of birth: Halberstadt, East Germany
- Position: Goalkeeper

Youth career
- Glückauf Sondershausen
- Lok Halberstadt
- WK Schmalkalden

Senior career*
Years	Team	Apps	(Gls)
1985–1988	Dynamo Dresden	12	(0)
1988–????	Fortschritt Bischofswerda		
- * Club domestic league appearances and goals

Jens Ramme (born 2 August 1963) is a German former footballer who played as a goalkeeper for Dynamo Dresden. He is notable for being on the receiving end of one of the biggest comebacks in footballing history.

== Career ==
Having been educated in the Magdeburg sports school, Ramme spent much of his early career in the East German second division, representing Glückauf Sondershausen, Lokomotive Halberstadt and WK Schmalkalden before joining DDR-Oberliga powerhouses Dynamo Dresden in 1985. He was signed to play for the reserve team and occasionally served as understudy to first-choice 'keeper Bernd Jakubowski. His debut came in 1986, and turned out to be catastrophic: Dynamo were playing against Bayer Uerdingen of West Germany in the quarter-final of the 1985–86 European Cup Winners' Cup, and having won the first leg 2–0, they were 3–1 up at half-time in the second leg when Jakubowski had to be taken off, injured. Ramme was brought on, and proceeded to let in six goals in the half, as Dynamo lost 7–3, 7–5 on aggregate. The six goals came in the space of 29 minutes: Wolfgang Funkel (who had been involved in the challenge that injured Jakubowski) scored a penalty in the 58th minute, which was followed by an own goal by Ralf Minge five minutes later. Wolfgang Schäfer and Dietmar Klinger added goals on 65 and 78 minutes respectively, then Funkel scored another penalty to complete a hattrick, having scored Uerdingen's goal in the first half. Schäfer completed the scoring with his second goal in the 86th minute.

The Uerdingen debacle scuppered any hopes Ramme had of a career with Dynamo – he made 12 league appearances, but when it was time for Jakubowski to retire, the club turned to Ronny Teuber of 1. FC Union Berlin to replace him. Ramme left Dynamo in 1988 to join Fortschritt Bischofswerda, but soon afterwards was forced to retire early with a hand injury.
