= Jens Christian Refsgaard =

Danish hydrologist and academic (born 1951)

- Occupations: Hydrologist and academic

Academic background
- Education: M.S., Hydrology; Doctorate, Natural Science
- Alma mater: Technical University of Denmark; University of Copenhagen

Academic work
- Institutions: Geological Survey of Denmark and Greenland (GEUS)

Jens Christian Refsgaard is a hydrologist and academic. He is an emeritus professor at the Geological Survey of Denmark and Greenland.

Refsgaard's research focuses on hydrological modelling, uncertainty analysis, and water resources.

== Education ==
Refsgaard completed his Master's in Hydrology from the Technical University of Denmark in 1976. Later, he obtained a Doctorate in Natural Science from the University of Copenhagen in 2007.

== Career ==
Refsgaard was appointed as an assistant professor Technical University of Denmark in 1978 before becoming an associate professor in 1982, and remained in that position until 1984. Simultaneously, he worked at the Danish Hydraulic Institute (DHI) from 1980 to 2000. He was then a research professor at the Geological Survey of Denmark and Greenland from 2000 to 2018 and has been an emeritus professor there since 2019.

== Research ==
Refsgaard's research has focused on catchment modelling, good modelling practice, uncertainty assessment, and water resources. In catchment modelling, he has worked with physically based hydrological systems such as the MIKE SHE. His work has addressed model parametrization, calibration and validation, as well as comparative evaluation, and has also examined the methodological development of hydrological models. He has contributed to the formulation of guidance on good modelling practice to support appropriate and consistent model use.

In the area of uncertainty assessment of models, Refsgaard has studied approaches for identifying and analysing uncertainties. His publications have highlighted the implications of model structure error and strategies for addressing geological uncertainty in groundwater flow modelling. He has also outlined the modelling procedure and defined modelling uncertainty.

Beyond modelling, Refsgaard's research has examined groundwater–surface water interactions in Denmark through analyses of geomorphological, geological, and hydrological characteristics across multiple regional catchment types. His work has also discussed the accelerating impacts of climate change on the Baltic Sea, describing it as indicative of future coastal ocean conditions.

== Awards and honors ==
- 2005 – Fellow, The Danish Academy of Technical Sciences
- 2011 – G.O. Andrup Groundwater Award, Vandcenter Syd

== Selected articles ==
- Refsgaard, Jens Christian; Knudsen, Jesper (July 1996). "Operational Validation and Intercomparison of Different Types of Hydrological Models". Water Resources Research. 32 (7): 2189–2202. Bibcode:1996WRR....32.2189R. doi:10.1029/96WR00896.
- Refsgaard, Jens Christian (November 1997). "Parameterisation, calibration and validation of distributed hydrological models". Journal of Hydrology. 198 (1–4): 69–97. Bibcode:1997JHyd..198...69R. doi:10.1016/S0022-1694(96)03329-X.
- Refsgaard, Jens Christian; Henriksen, Hans Jørgen (January 2004). "Modelling guidelines––terminology and guiding principles". Advances in Water Resources. 27 (1): 71–82. Bibcode:2004AdWR...27...71R. doi:10.1016/j.advwatres.2003.08.006.
- Refsgaard, Jens Christian; van der Sluijs, Jeroen P.; Brown, James; van der Keur, Peter (November 2006). "A framework for dealing with uncertainty due to model structure error". Advances in Water Resources. 29 (11): 1586–1597. Bibcode:2006AdWR...29.1586R. doi:10.1016/j.advwatres.2005.11.013.
- Refsgaard, Jens Christian; van der Sluijs, Jeroen P.; Højberg, Anker Lajer; Vanrolleghem, Peter A. (November 2007). "Uncertainty in the environmental modelling process – A framework and guidance". Environmental Modelling & Software. 22 (11): 1543–1556. Bibcode:2007EnvMS..22.1543R. doi:10.1016/j.envsoft.2007.02.004.
- Refsgaard, Jens Christian; Stisen, Simon; Koch, Julian (January 2022). "Hydrological process knowledge in catchment modelling – Lessons and perspectives from 60 years development". Hydrological Processes. 36 (1) e14463. Bibcode:2022HyPr...36E4463R. doi:10.1002/hyp.14463.
