= Jens Hoffmann (filmmaker) =

German director and writer

Jens Hoffmann is a German director, writer and cinematographer.

== History ==
Hoffmann had his start in the mountains with a 16 mm camera. Having grown up in the Black Forest region of Germany, he started skiing at an early age and it quickly became a significant part of his life. As he traveled to distant mountain ranges, it became difficult to find a cameraman who was skilled enough and willing to partake in the adventures so he started to operate the cameras himself. In the early 1990s he began studying journalism in Munich and got his first job in the industry working as a producer and journalist in sports television.

After five years in television, of which two were spent with the Formula One circuit, he was offered a position as Assistant Director and Executive Producer for Willy Bogner Films. This was his first chance to work on a major film with a big budget. This included IMAX cameras and huge set ups. He made several movies for the sports industry and commercials.

In 2000, he started his own production company: F24 Film. Though he continued to produce commercials and corporate movies, he began to focus more on feature-length documentaries that branched into more personal portrayals. His first of this kind was about his former boss, Willy Bogner, entitled Portrait of a Filmmaker, in 2000.

In 2002, he began working on 20 Seconds of Joy, the story of Karina Hollekim. In 2008, the filmmaker stepped into the world of documentary film with a screening of 20 Seconds of Joy at HotDocs in Toronto, Ontario, Canada. Since 2004, Jens has received several awards for his work on commercials and corporate movies, including the official city profiles for the 2006 FIFA World Cup. His documentary, Fatima’s Hand, has received 16 international awards, including Best Documentary on Sports at the Banff Film Festival in 2006. He won the award again in 2007 with 20 Seconds of Joy, and in 2008 with Journey to the Center. His movie, 9 to 5: Days in Porn, had its world premiere at the Montreal World Film Festival in 2008; it also had screenings at the Rio de Janeiro International Film Festival, and the Miami International Film Festival.
