= Elizabeth Jens =

Australian propulsion engineer

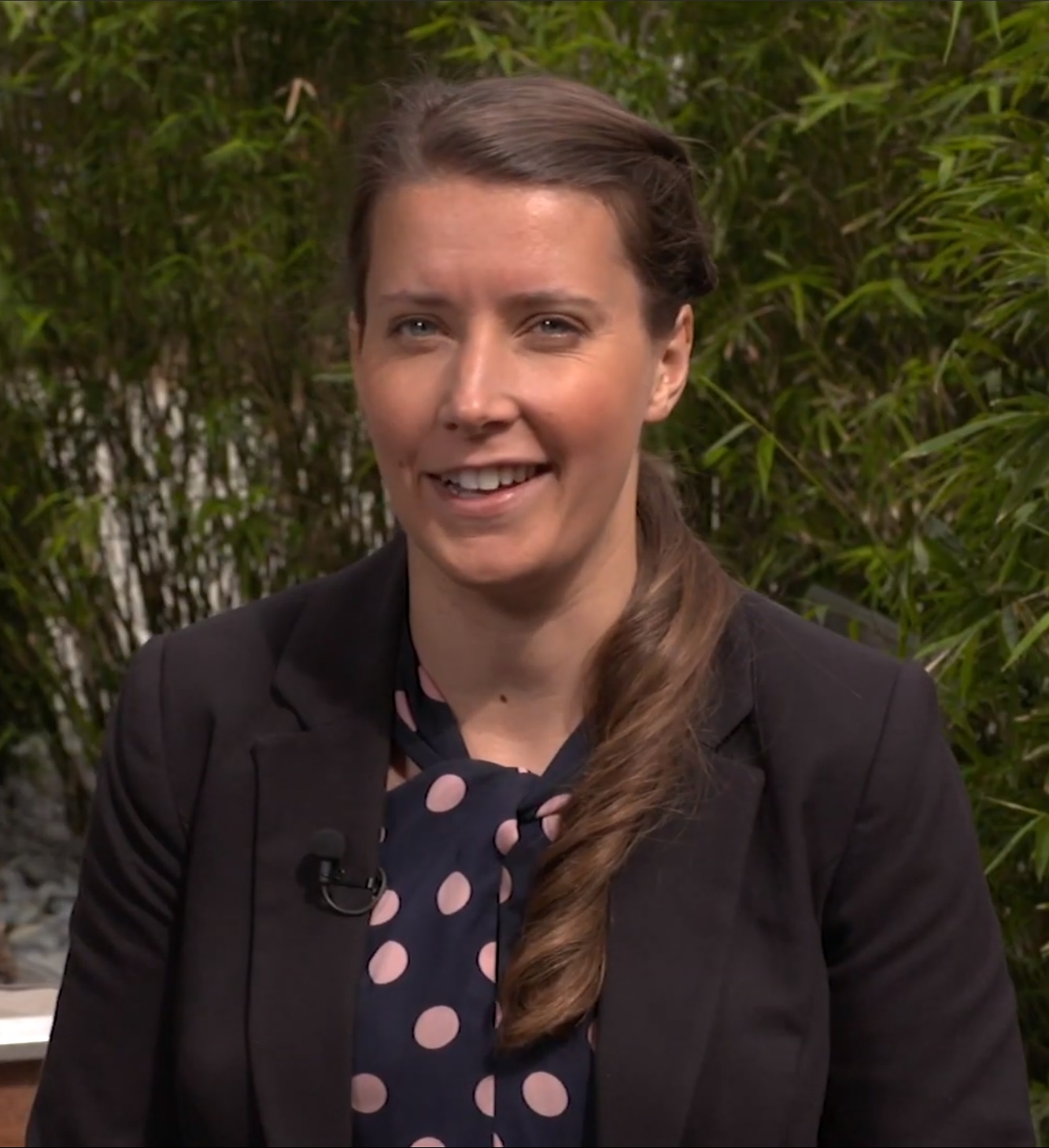
- Jens in 2019 US Embassy Canberra video
- Born: Torquay, Victoria
- Education: University of Melbourne; Stanford University
- Scientific career
- Workplaces: Jet Propulsion Laboratory
- Thesis: Hybrid rocket combustion and applications to space exploration missions (2015)

Elizabeth Jens (born 1984) is an Australian propulsion engineer who works at the NASA Jet Propulsion Laboratory.

== Early life and education ==
Jens is from Torquay, Victoria. She decided at the age of twelve that she wanted to be an astronaut, after seeing a talk from one of the Apollo astronauts in Geelong. She went to school at Sacred Heart College, Geelong, where she was encouraged to study maths and physics. She studied at the University of Melbourne, graduating with a bachelor's degree in mechanical engineering and bachelor's degree in physics in 2008. She attended an introductory course at the International Space University at Ames Research Center. She completed her graduate studies as a Fulbright scholar (sponsored by BHP) and Rotary International Scholar at Stanford University. After her Masters, Jens joined Jet Propulsion Laboratory as an intern, before beginning a PhD in aeronautics and astronautics. Jens was an Amelia Earhart Fellow in 2012 and 2014. She completed her PhD, "Hybrid Rocket Combustion and Applications to Space Exploration Missions" in 2016, under the supervision of Brian Cantwell and G. Scott Hubbard. Whilst still a student, Jens was recognised as an Emerging Space Industry Leader.

== Career ==
Jens works on a cold-gas subsystem for Mars 2020. She is also designing the propulsion systems for interplanetary SmallSat missions.

Jens is involved with several initiatives to increase Australia's investment in the space industry. She appeared on Australia's Science Channel as an expert discussing Elon Musk's Mars plan. She took part in the Australia SXSW Festival. She supports Tech Girls Canada. In 2018 Jens was listed as a Game Changer by Vogue (magazine).
