= Jens Nacke =

German politician (born 1971)

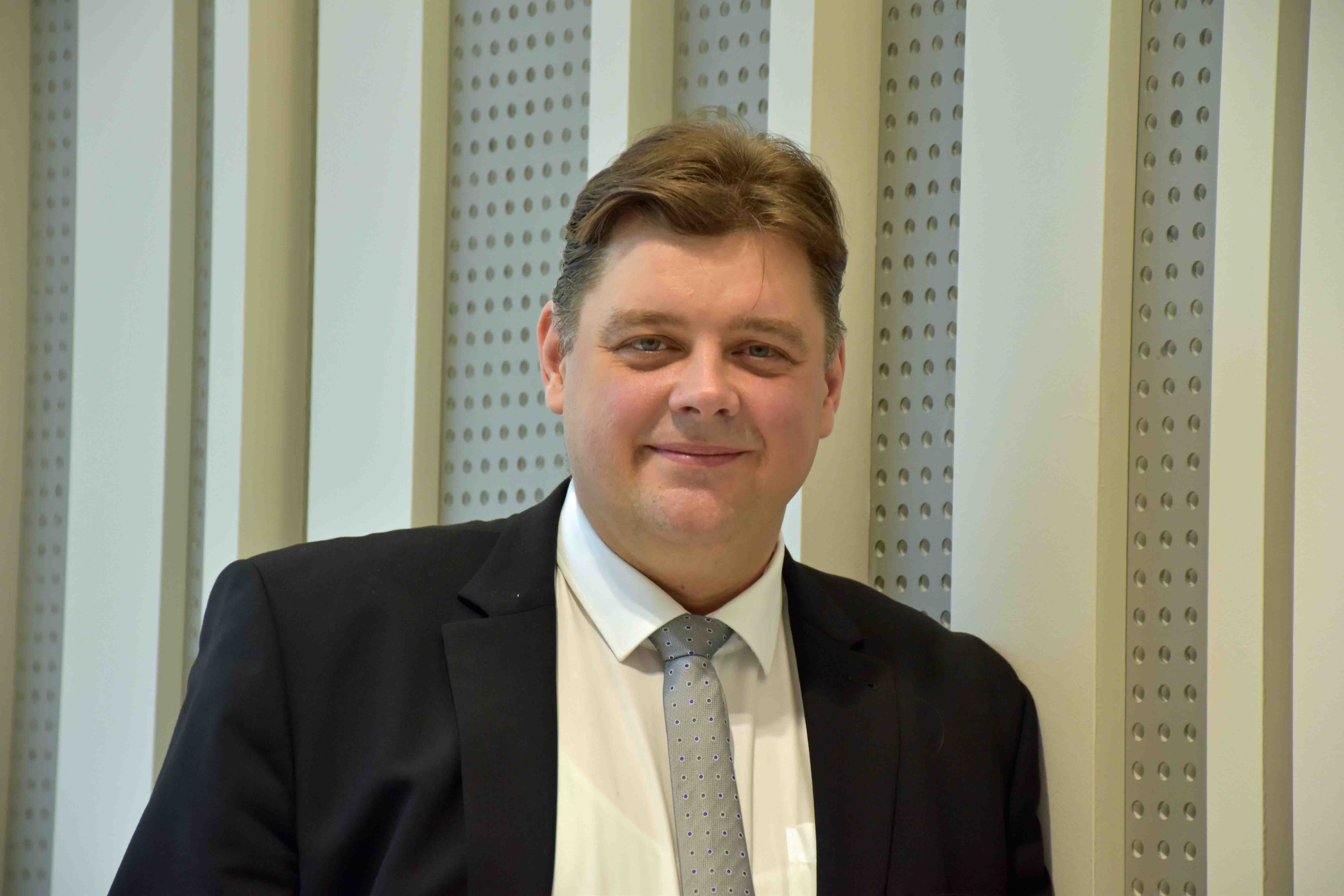
- Nacke in 2019

Member of the Landtag of Lower Saxony
- Incumbent
- Assumed office 4 March 2003

Personal details
- Born: 13 September 1971 (age 54) Oldenburg
- Party: Christian Democratic Union (since 1987)

Jens Nacke (born 13 September 1971 in Oldenburg) is a German politician serving as a member of the Landtag of Lower Saxony since 2003. He has served as vice president of the Landtag since 2022.
