= Jens O. Herrle =

German micropaleontologist (born 1968)

Jens Herrle (born 1968) is a German micropaleontologist. He is professor at the institute of earth sciences at the Frankfurter Goethe-Universität. At the German society for polar science, he is speaker of the working group for geology and geophysics.

== Life ==
Herrle studied geology at the Ruhr-Universität Bochum until 1998. He then joined the university of Tübingen as assistant at the institute for paleontology. He finished his doctorate summa cum laude in 2002. He won the prize for the best dissertation on a geological faculty.

From 2002 to 2005 Herrle was postdoc at the ETH Zürich and the University of Southampton.

In 2005 he joined the University of Liverpool as lecturer at the department of Earth and Ocean Sciences. In 2006 he joined the University of Alberta in Edmonton as assistant professor at the department of Earth and Atmospheric sciences.

In 2009 Herrle was appointed as professor at the institute for earth sciences at the Goethe-Universität Frankfurt. In 2014 he took part in an expedition to the islands of Axel Heiberg and Ellesmere in Nunavut with Claudia Schröder-Adams. In 2015/2016 Herrle joined the institute of earth sciences at the university of Toronto as Joubin James guest professor.

Since 2018 he is together with Cornelia Spiegel from the university of Bremen speaker otf the working group Geologie und Geophysik at the German scociety for polar sciences.

In 2018 Herrle, Jörg Bollmann, Christina Gebühr, Hartmut Schulz, Rosie M. Steward, Annika Giesenberg published an article about a rise of the sea level by more than 1.4 meter in the south eastern Mediterranean more than 9000 years ago. They could conclude that the concentration of salt in the northern Aegean Sea was considerably lower around 8400 BC, when a freshwater outburst of Lake Agassiz into the Hudson Bay happened, and around 7600 BC, when the Laurentide Ice Sheet melted. The sea surface salinity, as this is called, did not change so much in the southern Aegean Sea, which means the fresh water responsible could only come out of the Black Sea.

== Publications ==
- List of publications at the Goethe-Universität website
- Google Scholar Profile
