= Jens Lund =

Danish painter, designer and graphic artist (1871–1924)

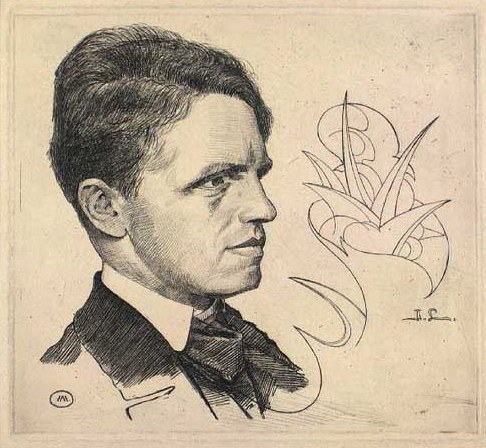
Self-portrait (date unknown)

Jens Martin Victor Lund (18 November 1871 – 10 June 1924) was a Danish painter, designer and graphic artist.

== Studies ==
His father was a cabinetmaker for the Royal Court. He left school in 1886, after the loss of both of his parents left him with a nervous ailment, and became a student of the painter, Axel Hou. Although he also studied silviculture and law, he eventually decided to focus on art as a career. He was married in 1893 to the daughter of a local catechist.

He spent a year working with Jens Jensen-Egeberg, but his greatest inspiration came during a stay in Paris from 1896 to 1899, when he studied at the Académie Julian with Tony Robert-Fleury and became acquainted with his fellow Danish artists, Rudolph Tegner, Johannes Holbek and Niels Hansen Jacobsen.

This was followed by a long series of travels; many in the company of Tegner. His trips included Italy (1901-1903 and 1905-1907), Greece (1902), Spain and Morocco (1905), Bruges (1909) and Gotland (1910).

Throughout his work, he attempted to forge a connection between writing and graphic expression; publishing two works with text to advance his goal: Livets Skov (1901) and Forvandlede Blomster (1899). Asger Jorn considered some of his early works to be forerunners of Surrealism. His later works were more naturalistic.

In an unpublished memoir, Mindet og Nuet (1921), he described the life of the Danish art community in Paris and their attraction to Symbolism and Art Nouveau. He was president of the Graphic Arts Society from 1921 until his death.

Among his numerous book illustrations are those for Brand by Henrik Ibsen, Bruges-la-Morte by Georges Rodenbach (translated by Lund and his wife) and Les Fleurs du Mal by Charles Baudelaire.

== Gallery ==
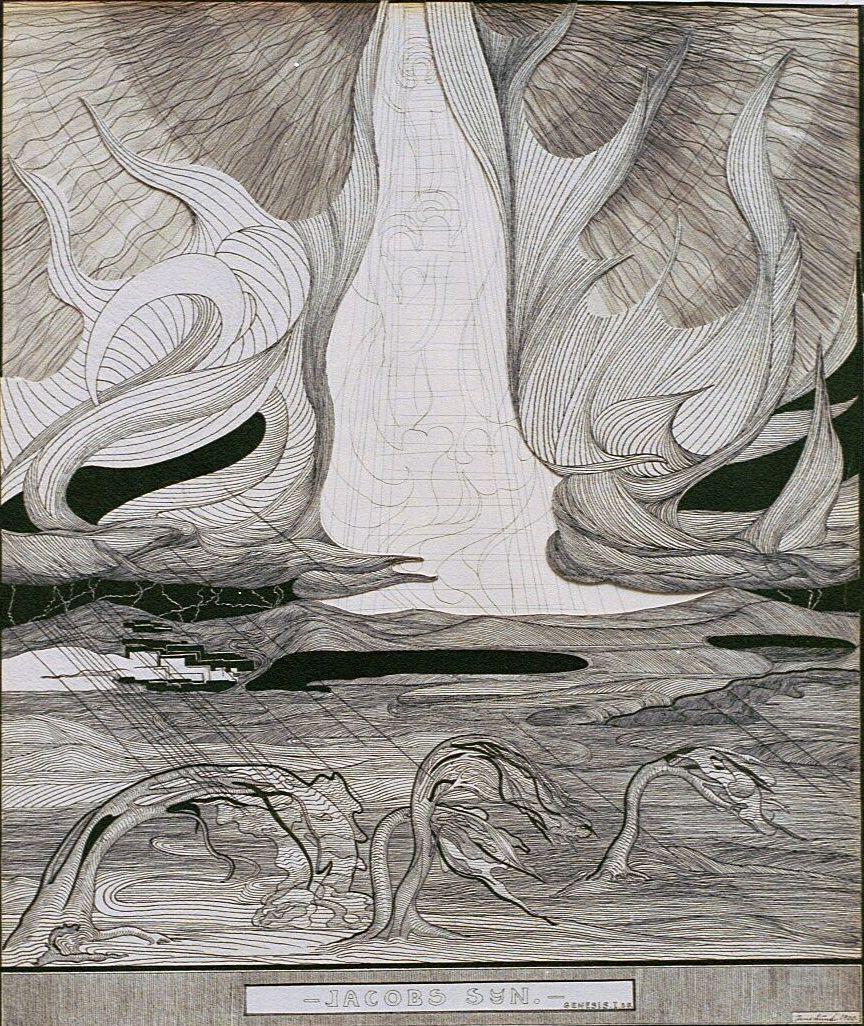
Jacobs Syn (1900)

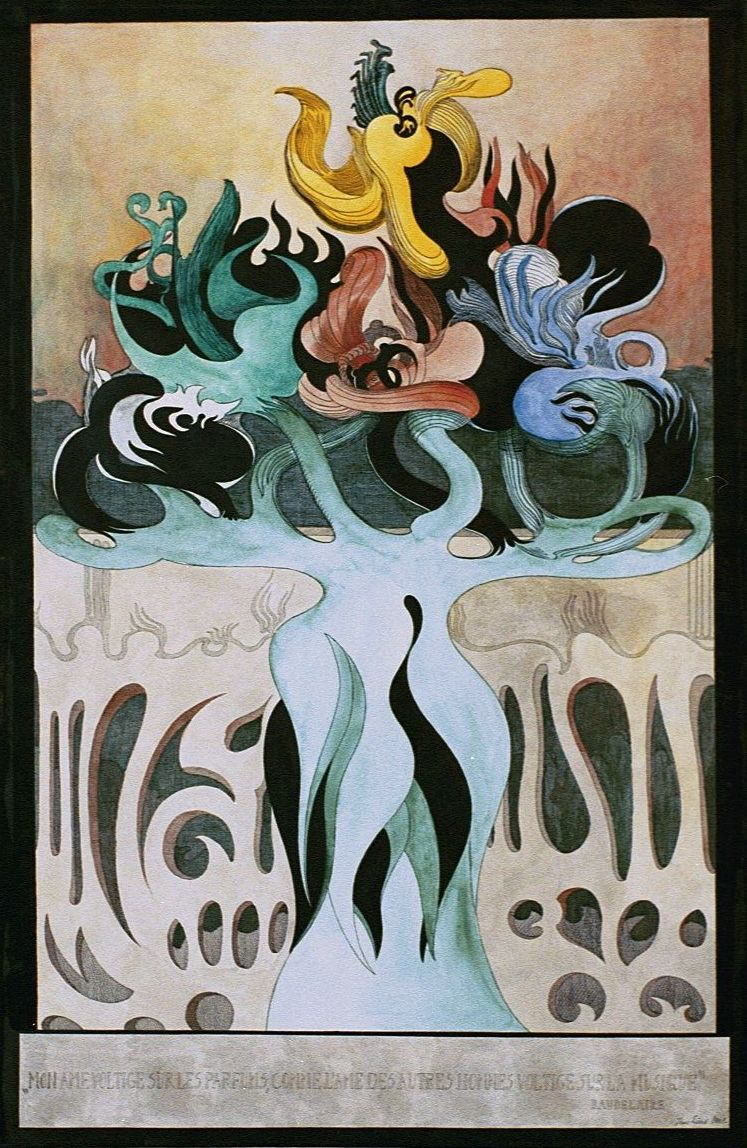
Illustration from
Les Fleurs du Mal (1901)

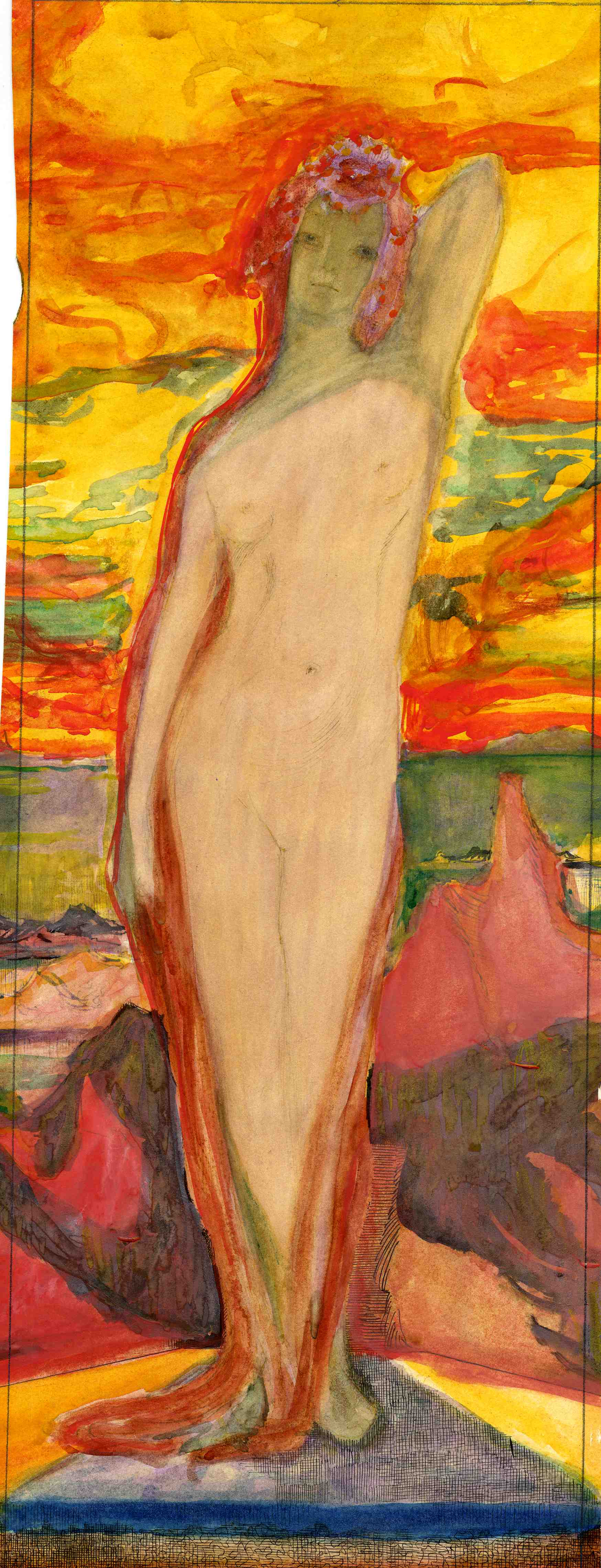
Aphrodite (1905)

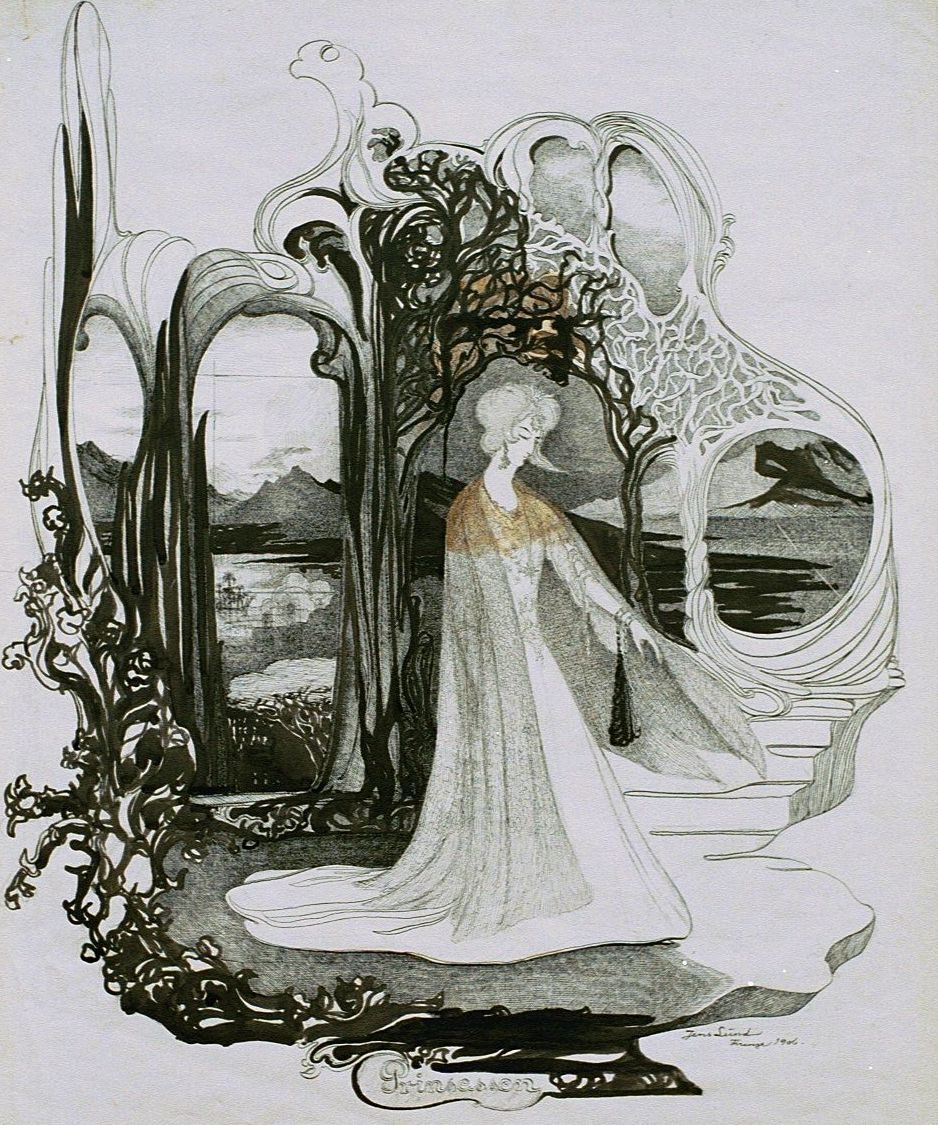
Princess (1906)

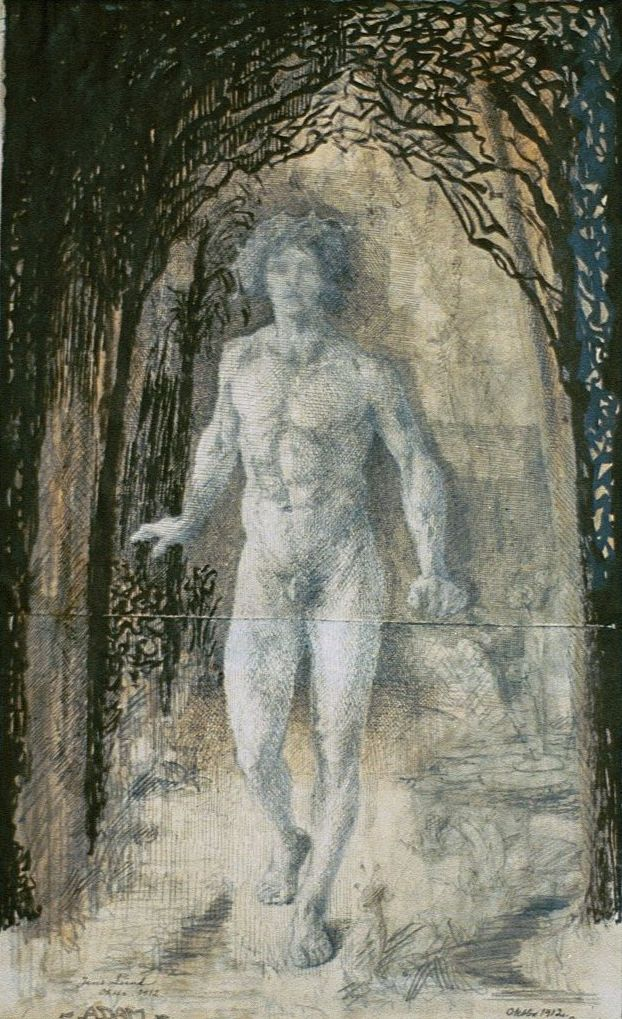
Adam (1912)
