= Jens Pühse =

German politician (born 1972)

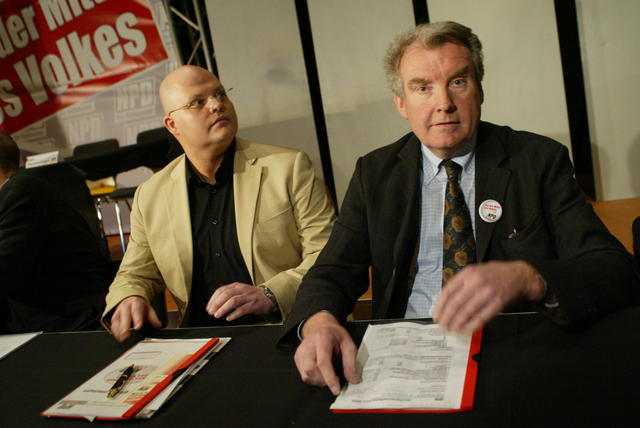
Puehse (left) with Erwin Kemna, 2006

Jens Pühse (born 22 January 1972) is an extreme right-wing German politician from Wilhelmshaven. He is a member of the German National Democratic Party (NPD).

In 1987, he became a member of the Junge Nationaldemokraten (JN), but he left the organization in 1990 because he perceived it to be too liberal. Subsequently, he joined the Nationalist Front (NF) until it was banned by the government in November 1992. In 1994, he came back to JN and he became the leader of NPD Freising in 1997. In the 2004 Landtag election in Saxony, he acquired 6.3% of the votes.
