= Jens Petter Stang =

Norwegian footballer (born 1977)

Personal information
- Date of birth: 28 November 1977 (age 48)
- Height: 1.76 m (5 ft 9 in)
- Position: Defender

Youth career
- –1996: Lyn

Senior career*
Years	Team	Apps	(Gls)
1997–1998	Lyn	27	(4)
1999–2003	Byåsen		
2004	St. Hanshaugen		
- * Club domestic league appearances and goals

Jens Petter Stang (born 28 November 1977) is a retired Norwegian football player.

Stang began his career in the youth system of Lyn and made his senior debut in June 1997. He spent one season in Eliteserien and one in 1. divisjon before moving to Trondheim to pursue higher education, during which he played for Byåsen on the second tier.

In the 1999 1. divisjon, Byåsen was deducted points for financial irregularities and remained in the relegation zone throughout the season. In the final match of the season against Skjetten SK, Stang scored a decisive extra-time goal, securing a victory that allowed Byåsen to avoid relegation at the expense of FK Lofoten.

In 2004 he appeared for St. Hanshaugen IF. He later continued playing as a veteran's football player for Oppegård IL.
