= Jens Kjell Otterbech =

Norwegian diplomat (born 1933)

Jens Kjell Otterbech (born 2 September 1933) is a Norwegian diplomat.

Otterbech was born in Hisøy Municipality, Norway. He graduated with the siv.øk. degree in business administration. He started working for the Norwegian Ministry of Foreign Affairs in 1961. In 1981, he became deputy under-secretary of state, and from 1984, was an adviser in trade policy.

In 1986, Otterbech got his first ambassadorial post in Singapore. When the Norwegian Nobel Committee awarded the Nobel Peace Prize to Aung San Suu Kyi in 1991, Otterbech was tasked with requesting travel permission from the Burmese government. Otterbech was denied entry to Burma.

Otterbech was then appointed the first Norwegian ambassador to South Africa, as diplomatic ties were created in light of de-apartheidization. He assumed office in 1992. He received side accreditations to Lesotho and Swaziland. Lastly, from 1996 to 2000 he was the ambassador to Vietnam, also being accredited to Laos.

He resided at Stabekk.
