= Jens Edvin A. Skoghøy =

Norwegian judge (born 1955)

Jens Edvin Andreassen Skoghøy (born February 16, 1955) is a Norwegian lawyer, former Supreme Court justice, and professor of law.

Skoghøy grew up on Ringvassøya, north of Tromsø, in a liberal Laestadian congregation. He completed his secondary education in Tromsø in 1974.

He graduated as cand.jur. at the University of Oslo in 1976 and took the dr.juris degree at the University of Tromsø in 1990. He subsequently became a professor there, and has also worked as a lawyer.

He was appointed Supreme Court Justice in 1998, as one of the youngest ever. He is a member of the Norwegian Academy of Science and Letters. In early 2017 he resigned from the Supreme Court to resume his professorship at the University of Tromsø.

In 2020, he was reappointed to the Supreme Court and took office on October 12, 2020. A year later he became the most senior justice on the court, ranking after the Chief Justice. In the fall of 2022, after experiencing deteriorating health, Skoghøy was hospitalized and took leaves of absence from the Court. He also accused his wife of poisoning him.

In April, 2023, Skoghøy announced his resignation from the Supreme Court, effective July 1, 2023. The Supreme Court agreed to pay him a lump sum of 3.6 million NOK. The agreement allowed Skoghøy to retain a salary equivalent to that of a Supreme Court judge until his retirement age in 2025 and covered his legal expenses related to the resignation agreement. This type of departure — induced departure — where a justice’s resignation is not voluntary and is accompanied by financial incentives, was seen as unprecedented in Norway.

Skoghøy has written a number of articles and books on, among other things, dispute resolution, lien law, and civil procedure.
