= Jens Bangsbo =

Danish physiologist and footballer (born 1957)

Jens Bangsbo (born 2 October 1957) is a Danish professor of physiology and sports science at the University of Copenhagen and a former football player and assistant coach of both Atalanta Bergamasca Calcio and the Denmark national football team. He has written more than 25 books on football and physiology.

== Football career ==
He played for Kastrup Boldklub, Lyngby Boldklub, Esbjerg Boldklub and Hvidovre Boldklub from 1970s to 1990s. He reached more than 350 games in the Danish 1st Division. He also played in the Denmark national team as youth and senior player.

== Academic career ==
Jens Bangsbo studied mathematics and physiology at the University of Copenhagen, graduating in 1984 and achieved the honoured degree Doctor of Science in 1994. He became a professor at the Department of Nutrition, Exercise and Sports in 2003.

== Football coaching ==
Jens Bangsbo is a UEFA pro-license coach (2014) and UEFA, AFC and FIFA instructor. In 1999-2001 he was assistant for Carlo Ancelotti at Juventus FC. Between 2001 and 2004 he was the assistant coach of the successful first team of Juventus FC, winning two Italian Championships, two Super-cups and played in the Champions League final in 2003. During this time, he was training players like Zinedine Zidane, Gigi Buffon, Alessandro Del Piero and Pavel Nedved (winning the golden ball in 2003). He was technical/tactical consultant for head coach Lorenzo Serra Ferrer of the 2007/2008 successful Champions League team AEK Athens. He has been assistant coach for head coach Morten Olsen at the Denmark national team until 2016 and during EURO 2004, World Cup 2010 and EURO 2012. On 23 January 2020 he was appointed fitness coach for the EURO 2020.

Since October 2018, he is assistant to the coaching staff of Atalanta Bergamo, on a part-time basis. "I can't or will not give up the many tasks I am responsible for within the Center for Team Games and Health at the University of Copenhagen." he told Danish national television TV3.

== Other activities ==
He is the inventor of the Yo-Yo tests, which are the most used tests in soccer. He has also developed a number of video-programs within agility, speed and aerobic training (www.insidesoccer.com) and the fitness education for AFC. He has developed the Creative Speed test for Cristiano Ronaldo. He also developed the Boot Camp, Speed and Ignite programs for Nike with specific programs for players like Andres Iniesta, Carlos Tevez, Nani, Ronaldinho and Cesc Fabregas.

He has written more than 15 books about football of which three deals with the tactical aspect “Soccer Systems and Strategies”, “Offensive Soccer Tactics” and “Defensive Soccer Tactics”, each sold in more than 10,000 copies. In addition, ten books about fitness training specific to demands in the game of football. Recently also the chapter ”Popular systems and styles of play” in Science and Football” (2016), Taylor & Francis.

== Written works ==
In Danish

- Fodbold - træning og undervisning. Frydenlund (2007)
- Træningsfysiologi. Frydenlund (2008)
- 10-20-30 metoden – Verdens bedste og nemmeste løbetræning. Samvirke (2013)

In English

Jens Bangsbo has written more than 300 scientific articles in international journals, reviews and chapters in books. In addition, within the past 10 years a number of books:

- Aerobic and Anaerobic Training in Football (2011) Stormtryk. ISBN 978-87-90170-21-9.
- Fitness Testing in Football (2014) Bangsbosport ISBN 978-87-994880-0-1
- Exercise and Training Physiology - A Simple Approach (2011) SISU ISBN 978-91-863323-34-9
- Power Training in Football (2013) Bangsbosport ISBN 978-87-994880-1-8
- Individual Training in Football (2014) Bangsbosport ISBN 978-87-994880-2-5
- 11 against 10 – why is it so difficult? Bangsbosport
- Science and Football (2016) Taylor & Francis
- Nutrition in Football (2017) Bangsbosport ISBN 978-87-994880-3-2
