= Jens Nygaard =

American conductor (1931–2001)

Jens Nygaard (October 26, 1931 – September 24, 2001) was an American orchestra conductor. He founded the Jupiter Symphony in 1979 in New York with a grant from the Rockefeller Foundation. He was also the subject of a documentary entitled Life on Jupiter by Martin Spinelli.

During the years of 1979 to 1988, and 1990 to 1993, he conducted the Naumburg Orchestral Concerts, in the Naumburg Bandshell, Central Park, in the summer series. He also composed a 'Naumburg Fanfare' in 1985 for the summer series, on the 80th anniversary of the concerts in the park.
