= Jens Gieseke (historian) =

German historian (born 1964)

- Born: 1964 (age 61–62); Langenhagen, Lower Saxony, West Germany
- Occupation: Historian

Jens Gieseke (born 1964 in Langenhagen) is a German historian. His work is focused on the German Democratic Republic and its Ministry for State Security (The Stasi).

== Life ==
Jens Gieseke was born in Lower Saxony, then in West Germany. In 1984, after successful completion of his schooling, he went on to study History, Political Sciences and Law at Leibniz University Hannover, where he obtained his Master's degree in 1990, and the University of Potsdam, where he obtained his doctorate.

Between 1993 and 2008 he worked as an associate in the research and training department at the Federal Commission for the Stasi Records in Berlin.

== Publications ==
- (with Stephan Fingerle) Partisanen des Kalten Krieges. Die Untergrundtruppe der Nationalen Volksarmee 1957 bis 1962 und ihre Übernahme durch die Staatssicherheit. Hg. BStU. Berlin, 1996, ISBN 978-3-942130-57-8.
- (with Doris Hubert) Die DDR-Staatssicherheit: Schild und Schwert der Partei, Federal Agency for Civic Education, Bonn 2000, ISBN 3-89331-402-4.
- Die hauptamtlichen Mitarbeiter der Staatssicherheit: Personalstruktur und Lebenswelt 1950–1989/90, Berlin 2000, ISBN 3-86153-227-1.
- Der Mielke-Konzern (PDF; 806 kB), Stuttgart 2001, ISBN 3-421-05481-9.
- Staatssicherheit und Gesellschaft, Göttingen 2007, ISBN 978-3-525-35083-6.
- (with Lukasz Kaminski, Krzysztof Persak [edited]) Handbuch der kommunistischen Geheimdienste in Osteuropa 1944–1991, Göttingen 2009, ISBN 978-3-525-35100-0.
- Die Stasi 1945–1990, München 2011, ISBN 978-3-570-55161-5.
- Contributor to Wer war wer in der DDR? 5th edition. Links, Berlin 2010, ISBN 978-3-86153-561-4.
