= Jens Seipenbusch =

German politician (born 1968)

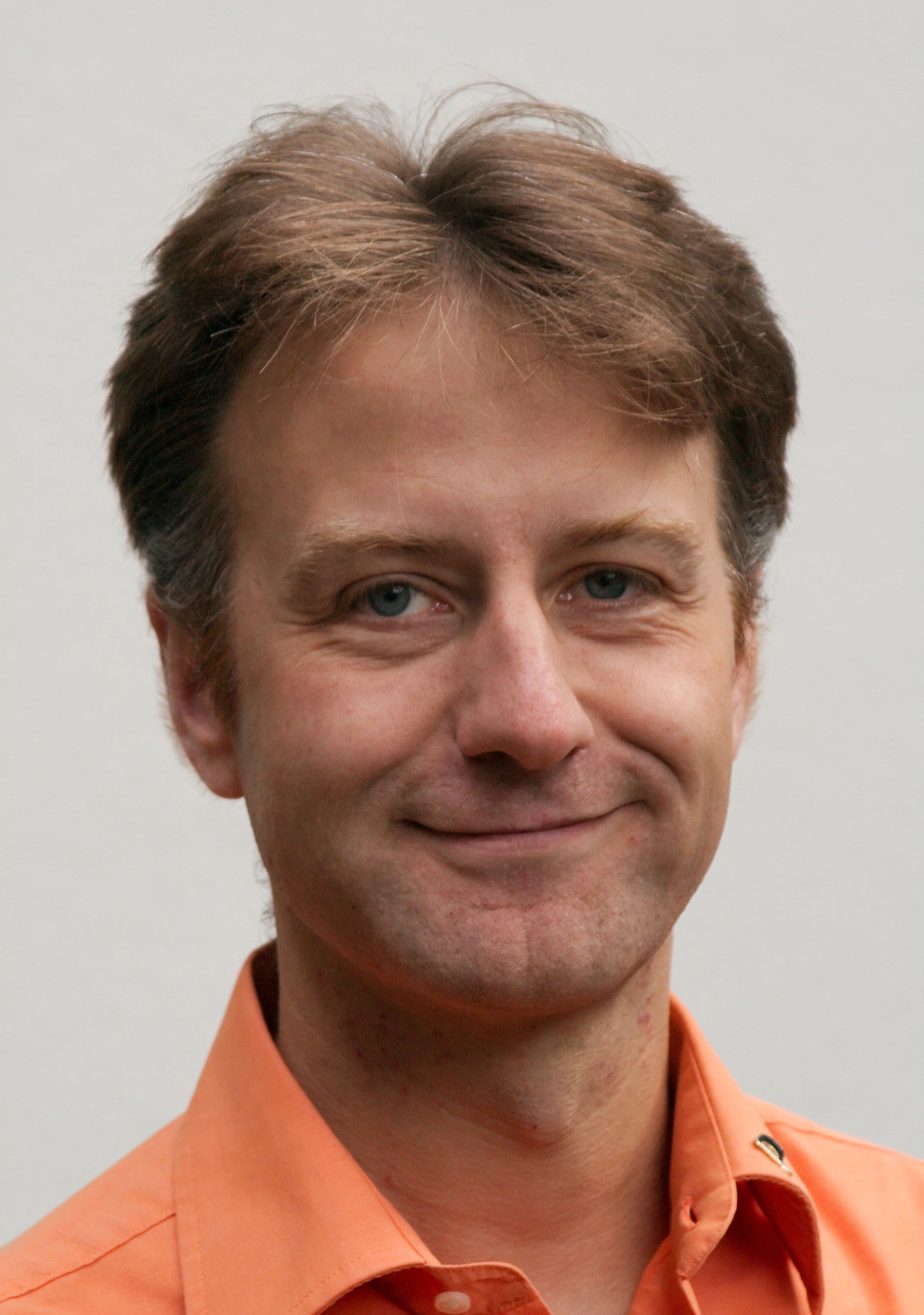

Personal details
- Born: 6 August 1968 (age 58) Wuppertal, North Rhine-Westphalia
- Party: Pirate Party Germany
- Education: University of Münster
- Profession: Physicist
- Website: (in German) Jens Seipenbusch (Vorsitzender), Page at party's website

Jens Peter Seipenbusch (born 6 August 1968) is a German politician and physicist who was leader of the Pirate Party Germany.

Seipenbusch, a founding member of his party, studied physics at the University of Münster. He was already party leader from May 2007 to May 2008, and afterwards deputy leader for one year, before he became re-elected leader of the party in July 2009, and once more in May 2010. He did not run again in May 2011.
