= Jens Andersen (businessman) =

Norwegian businessperson (1866-1937)

- Born: 1866
- Died: 1937 (aged 70–71)
- Occupation: Businessman

Jens Andersen (13 September 1866 – 5 January 1937) was a Norwegian businessperson.

He was born in Idd, and after taking his shoemaker training he worked for four years as a leather merchant in Fredrikstad. In 1898 he started the shoe factory Fredriksstad Skofabrik. He was the factory manager here until 1905, then a co-manager for I. T. Halvorsen Skofabrik in Halden from 1906 to 1910. In 1911 he started the company Skofabriken Norge in Kristiania, where he was the manager until 1924, then director. He was a board member of the Federation of Norwegian Industries and the Norwegian Employers' Confederation. He died in January 1937 and was buried at Vestre gravlund.
