= Jens Jensen-Egeberg =

Danish painter (1848–1922)

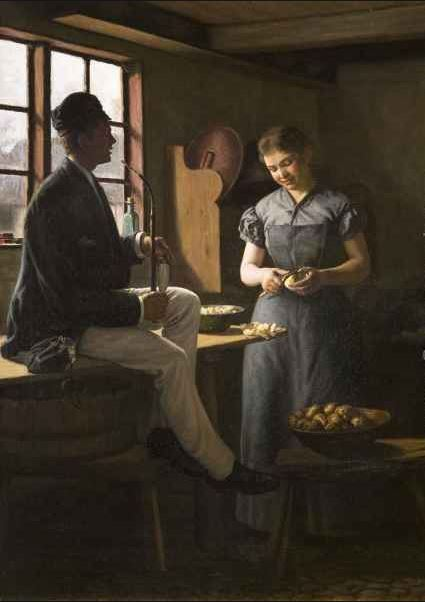
Flirt i køkkenet, 'Flirting in the Kitchen'

Jens Jørgen Jensen-Egeberg (26 April 1848 – 20 September 1922) was a Danish painter. His works include portraits, landscapes and genre scenes. He also worked in pastels.

== Biography ==
His father, Jens Pedersen (1802–1885) owned a farm; Jensen-Egeberg was born in Hedensted, Denmark, and grew up in the country. He began his education at the Uldum Folk High School, near Vejle, then went to Copenhagen in 1865 to attend the Blågård Seminarium, but decided that he wanted to be a painter instead. In pursuit of that, he took classes at the Copenhagen Technical College, received an award in 1874, and transferred to the Royal Danish Academy of Fine Arts. He graduated from there in 1880.

He held his first exhibit in 1881. His notable portraits include one of his parents (Old Folk, 1885), who both died shortly after it was exhibited, and one of his wife, which was shown in 1892.

His wife, whom he married in 1891, was Rigmor Marie Kiær (1866–1930), whose sister was married to the painter, Holger Grønvold. Her uncle was F. C. Smidt, a State Councilor (etatsråd) and Director of the Danmarks Nationalbank. The following year, he received public support for study trips, including a visit to Paris, and more exhibitions.

He also had a considerable career as a teacher; having begun teaching at the Technical College in 1876. He was named inspector there in 1890; a position he held until 1919. Among his best known students are Mogens Ballin, Jens Lund and Christian Bang.

He died in Hørsholm, Denmark, and was interred at Bispebjerg Cemetery.

== Sources ==
- Ph. Weilbach: Nyt dansk Kunstnerlexikon 1895-96, s. 518f
- Biographical data @ Kunstindeks Danmark
