= Jens Christensen (bishop) =

American Lutheran missionary (1899–1966)

- Born: Jens Martin Christensen; August 24, 1899; Chicago, Illinois
- Died: August 5, 1967 (aged 67); Chicago, Illinois
- Occupations: Missionary and author; Bishop of the Lutheran Church in Pakistan

Bishop Jens Martin Christensen (August 24, 1899 – August 5, 1967) was a Danish-American Lutheran missionary and bishop. Christensen was consecrated Bishop of the Lutheran Church in Pakistan (PLC) in 1955.

== Early life and mission work ==
Jens Christensen was born in 1899 in Chicago, of Danish parents. Jens' father, Christen Christensen (died 1944), was an engineer in the American Telegraph Service, and his mother was Margrethe Poulsen (died 1947). They were members of the Presbyterian Church.

During the First World War, Christensen volunteered for service and joined a regiment bringing provisions to the front line. Back home in 1918, he resolved to become a pastor/missionary abroad, and began his training at the New York Missionary Training School in Nyack. Christensen was sent to India by the Christian and Missionary Alliance in 1922, together with another young missionary, T. Wiley. They were sent to the North-West Frontier Province (NWFP) to learn the language and start mission work.

In 1925, Christensen accepted a post at the Danish Tent Mission (later called the Danish Pashtun Mission). He became engaged to one of the nursing sisters, Margrethe Rasmussen. They were married in January 1926.

== Literary career ==
Christensen had begun studying the Pashto language as soon as he arrived at the NWFP, and began in 1927 to write tracts in that language to aid in the missionary work. His first book in Danish was about the Pashtun people and Islam. In 1927 the Pashto Literature Committee was formed; six missionary societies were involved and Christensen chaired the committee. The reading room at Mardan, called Dar ul Tabligh (house of learning), became the center for printing and distribution.

Books from English, Danish and Urdu were translated, including: The Passion of Jesus Christ and The Life and Teaching of Jesus; the Altarbook, with prayers and texts for the Church Year; Luther's smaller catechism; several hymns in Danish; and Why I became a Christian by Sultan Paul from Urdu.

In 1931 Christensen began the translation into Pashto of Matthew's Gospel, followed in 1936 by the translation of John's Gospel, followed soon after by a new edition. The British and Foreign Bible Society met the cost (as it later did with the translation of the whole New Testament).

In M. A. Taib he found a lifelong co-worker. Taib was a Muslim convert from a village in Swat, where his father was a mullah. Taib, working as a librarian, kept a record of the distribution of tracts, booklets, and Bible portions. In 1938, after 10 years with the committee, it showed that 37 different books and tracts by 14 different authors had been published. 148,000 copies had been printed, which had been widely distributed through the Northwest Frontier province and across the border to Afghanistan.

Taib studied theology with Christensen and in 1938 he was ordained pastor by Bishop Johannes Sandegren from the Lutheran Swedish Church in South India. In April 1939 the church building at Mardan was consecrated by the Anglican Bishop George Lahore. There were now two congregations: one Pashto and one Urdu at Mardan, as well as small ones at Malakand and Swabi.

== World War II ==
When the Second World War broke out the Danish Mission was cut off from its home base and its support. Christensen received a commission as recruiting officer at Mardan in the Allied cause.

At this time he also chaired the committee for the translation of the New Testament from Greek into vernacular Pashto. It was finished in 1945.

From 1950 to 1960 he worked on a correspondence course comprising 37 lectures. There were students in several countries. The lectures were published in book form, The Practical Approach to Muslims, edited by a mission society in North Africa. The book has also been printed in German as Christuszeugnis für Muslime and in Danish as Konfrontation. Islam og Kristendom.

To help young preachers, Jens published his sermons for each Sunday in a church year. In 1955 he prepared the Constitution for the Lutheran Church in Pakistan (PLC), and in 1959 The Book of Common Worship of the Pakistani Lutheran Church, with the Creeds and the Augsburg Confession, was published.

He was consecrated Bishop of the Pakistani Lutheran Church in 1955. He was succeeded in 1966 by Rev. Arne Rudvin of Norway.

== Death ==
Christensen he died in 1967 in Chicago, just shy of his 68th birthday. At his side was his faithful wife and secretary Margrethe who, until her own death in 1983, very actively supported and promoted his work.
