= Gram (surname) =

Gram is a surname. Notable people with the surname include:

- Andrea Gram (1853–1927), Norwegian painter
- Bjørn Arild Gram (born 1972), Norwegian politician and minister
- Elisabeth Gram (born 1996), Austrian freestyle skier
- Gregers Gram (1917–1944), Norwegian World War II soldier and resistance fighter
- Gregers Gram (politician) (1846–1929), Norwegian jurist and politician
- Gyda Gram (1851–1906), Norwegian painter
- Hans Christian Gram (1853–1938), Danish scientist who invented Gram staining
- Hans Gram (composer) (1754–1804), Danish-American musician
- Hans Gram (historian) (1685–1748), Danish academic
- Harald Gram (1887–1961), Norwegian jurist, politician and genealogist
- Jason Gram (born 1984), Australian rules footballer
- Jens Gram (1840–1912), Norwegian industrialist
- Jens Gram Jr. (1897–1982), Norwegian barrister and politician
- Jens Jensen Gram (1779–1824), Norwegian jurist and politician
- Johan Fredrik Gram (1868–1947), Norwegian chemist
- Jørgen Pedersen Gram (1850–1916), Danish mathematician and actuary
- Mads Gram (1875–1929), Norwegian physician
- Peder Gram (1881–1956), Danish composer and organist
- Victor Gram ((1910–1969), Danish politician
