= Dybwad =

Dybwad or Dybvad is a surname. Notable people with the surname include:

- Christoffer Dybvad, (1578–1622), Danish mathematician
- Gunnar Dybwad (footballer) (1928–2012), Norwegian football player
- Gunnar Dybwad (professor) (1909–2001), American professor and disability rights advocate
- Iacob Dybwad Sømme (1898–1944), Norwegian ichthyologist and resistance member
- Jacob Dybwad (1823–1899), Norwegian bookseller and publisher
- Johanne Dybwad (alpine skier) (1918–2011), Norwegian skier
- Johanne Dybwad (1867–1950), Norwegian stage actress and producer
- Jørgen Dybvad, (died 1612), Danish theologian and mathematician
- Ola Dybwad-Olsen (born 1946), Norwegian football player
- Sinem Dybvad Demir (born 1992), Danish politician
- Vilhelm Dybwad (1863–1950), Norwegian barrister and writer
