= Per Gram =

Norwegian barrister (1910–1984)

Peder "Per" Gram (11 September 1910 – 12 March 1984) was a Norwegian barrister. His main contributions came within maritime law, as chief executive officer of the Nordisk Defence Club.

== Personal life ==
He was a son of physician Harald Mathias "Mads" Gram (1875–1929) and art historian Irma Ingertha Schram (1873–1945). On the paternal side he was a second cousin of Gregers Gram, nephew of Johan Fredrik Gram, grandson of Jens Gram, grandnephew of Andrea Gram, great-grandson of P. A. Munch and great-great-grandson of Jens Jensen Gram.

In 1939 he married alpine skier Johanne "Hannemor" Dybwad (1918–2011), a daughter of barrister Nils Juell Dybwad and granddaughter of actress Johanne Dybwad. Their daughter Kari Garmann became a politician.

== Career ==
He finished his secondary education in 1928 and Oslo Commerce School in 1929, and graduated from the Royal Frederick University with the cand.jur. degree in 1934. He was a junior solicitor in Oslo from 1935 to 1936, law clerk in London from 1936 to 1939 and then secretary in the Nordisk Defence Club from 1939. During the occupation of Norway by Nazi Germany he fled to Sweden and was a secretary at the Norwegian legation in Stockholm's Administration Office from 1943 to 1944, then at the Nortraship branch office from 1945. He was decorated with the Defence Medal 1940–1945 for war efforts.

Gram specialized in maritime law and freight law. He issued the scholarly books Fraktavtaler og deres tolkning in 1948 and Sjølovene på engelsk in 1950. In 1953 and 1963 he published registries of recent Nordic verdicts within maritime law. The first volume covered the period 1940–1951, the second covered the period 1952–1961. He was a lecturer at Oslo Shippingskole from 1947 to 1950 and censor for law candidates at the University of Oslo from 1950. He was also a member of the state's Maritime Law Commission from 1957 to 1981.

From 1949 he practised law as a barrister, with access to working with Supreme Court cases. He was also a secretary in the Norwegian Maritime Law Association from 1948 to 1963, thereafter a board member of the Scandinavian Institute of Maritime Law. However his main work was still as the secretary in the Nordisk Defence Club, where he was promoted to assisting director in 1958 and chief executive officer in 1960. He retired in 1978, but continued as a consultant, as well as partner since 1979 in the law firm Gram, Hambro & Garman.

Gram was decorated as a Knight, First Class of the Order of St. Olav and Commander of the Order of Vasa. He died in March 1984, and was buried in Norderhov.

| Preceded by Nils Juell Dybwad | Chief executive officer of the Nordisk Defence Club; 1960–1978 | Succeeded by Ole Lund |
