= Jens Gram Jr. =

Norwegian barrister and politician (1897–1982)

Jens Gram (21 July 1897 – 1982) was a Norwegian barrister and politician.

== Personal life ==
He was born in Fredrikstad as a son of chemist Johan Fredrik Gram (1868–1947) and Elisabeth Cappe Schram (1872–1943). He was a nephew of Irma and Mads Gram, paternal grandson of Jens Gram, grandnephew of Andrea Gram and great-great-grandson of Jens Jensen Gram.

In 1928 he married Antonie Due Lysholm, a daughter of physician Bjarne Lysholm (1861–1939) and Barbara Anker Bachke (1867–1939).

== Career ==
He finished his secondary education in 1915, and graduated from the Royal Frederick University with the cand.jur. degree in 1919. He was a deputy judge in Namdal in 1920, magistrate clerk in Kristiania from 1920 to 1922 and then studied in Paris for a year before becoming municipal secretary again. After two years as junior solicitor from 1924 to 1926, he started his own law firm in 1926. He partnered up with Ingar Skavlan and Chr. Blom from 1928, and the firm was later named Blom, Gram og Borch before Gram started on his own again in 1954.

From 1926 to 1946 he was the secretary of the Norges Huseierforbund, also editing their magazine Huseieren until 1940. He was the vice president of the Norwegian Fire Protection Association from 1943 to 1950 (board member since 1931), chaired Selskabet for Oslo Byes Vel from 1953 to 1961 (board member since 1947) and the Oslo branch of the Society for the Preservation of Ancient Norwegian Monuments until 1970. He was a member of Oslo city council from 1948 to 1952, and also a member of several public committees.

He was a supervisory member of Livsforsikringsselskapet Brage-Fram and Forsikringsselskapet Norden.

He was decorated as a Knight, First Class of the Order of the Dannebrog and Knight of the Order of the Polar Star. He died in 1982.
