= Gregers =

Gregers is a given name. Notable people with the given name include:

- Gregers Algreen-Ussing (born 1938), Danish architect and academic
- Gregers Arndal-Lauritzen (born 1998), Danish footballer
- Gregers Birgersson (died 1276), Swedish knight and major landowner
- Gregers Brinch (born 1964), Danish composer
- Gregers Gjersøe (born 1957), Danish explorer
- Gregers Gram (1917–1944), Norwegian resistance fighter and saboteur
- Gregers Gram (politician) (1846–1929), Norwegian jurist and politician
- Gregers Christian Haxthausen (1732–1802), Danish courtier and county governor
- Gregers Joensen (1835–1897), Faroese teacher and politician
- Gregers Krabbe (1594–1655), Danish nobleman
- Gregers Lundh (1786–1836), Norwegian military officer and academic
- Gregers Münter (1907–1988), Danish officer and sports shooter
- Gregers Winther Wulfsberg (1780–1846), Norwegian jurist and politician

== See also ==
- Greger (given name), another given name
- Greger, surname
