= Nils Juell Dybwad =

Norwegian barrister (1892–1972)

Nils Juell Dybwad (9 January 1892 – 27 June 1972) was a Norwegian barrister. He was chief executive officer of the Nordisk Defence Club for twenty-five years.

== Personal life ==
He was born in Kristiania as a son of lawyer Vilhelm Dybwad and actress Johanne Dybwad, née Juell. He was a paternal grandson of bookseller Jacob Dybwad and a nephew of architect Peter Dybwad. Through his father's second marriage he was a stepson of actress Bokken Lasson.

In 1916 he married Stella Boye Semb, a sister of chief physician Carl Boye Semb. Their daughter Johanne "Hannemor" Dybwad was an alpine skier in the 1930s, and married barrister Peder "Per" Gram, who was a son of physician Harald Mathias "Mads" Gram and art historian Irma Ingertha Schram. Their granddaughter Kari Garmann became a politician.

== Career ==
Dybwad finished his secondary education in 1910 and graduated from the Royal Frederick University with the cand.jur. degree in 1915. He was a deputy judge in Nedre Romerike for one year before being hired in the Nordisk Defence Club. He advanced from secretary to subdirector in 1923, and further to chief executive officer in 1935. During the occupation of Norway by Nazi Germany he was arrested for aiding the Kvarstad vessels in leaving neutral Sweden. He was imprisoned in Møllergata 19 from 22 to 30 September 1941, then in Grini concentration camp until 20 December 1942. The next year he fled the country to work in Nortraship, as the exiled government's representative in Sweden to broker shipbuilding contracts. He was a supervisory council member of the exiled Bank of Norway. He was succeeded by his son-in-law Per Gram as chief executive officer of the Nordisk Defence Club in 1960.

In addition to the Nordisk Defence Club post, he was a barrister from 1921. He also published a register of verdict collections in maritime law, Hovedregister til nordiske domme i sjøfartsanliggender 1918–27 in 1928 together with Peter Simonsen. From 1945 he edited the verdict collection periodical Nordiske Domme i Sjøfartsanliggender.

In sports he chaired the Association for the Promotion of Skiing from 1937 to 1939 and 1946 to 1948, and was a board member of the rowing club Studentenes RK. He was also a board member of the National Theatre.

Dybwad was decorated as a Knight, First Class of the Order of St. Olav (1953), Commander of the Order of Vasa and a Knight of the Order of the Dannebrog. He died in June 1972 and was buried in Ris.

Preceded by Johannes Jantzen	Chief executive officer of the Nordisk Defence Club; 1935–1960	Succeeded by Per Gram
Sporting positions
Preceded by Finn Qvale	Chairman of the Association for the Promotion of Skiing; 1937–1939	Succeeded by Lauritz Schmidt
Preceded by Lauritz Schmidt	Chairman of the Association for the Promotion of Skiing; 1946–1948	Succeeded by Ole Bøhn
