= Schram =

Schram is a German and Dutch surname, a variant of Schramm derived from the a nickname Schram, Schramme ('scratch, scar, wound'. Notable people with the surname include:

- Albert Schram (born 1964), Dutch-born academic
- Albin Schram (1926–2005), Austrian-Czech letter collector
- Bitty Schram (born 1968), American actress
- Constance Wiel Schram (1890–1955), Norwegian writer and translator
- Dávid Schram (born 1976), Hungarian musician and record producer
- Dominic Schram (1722–1797), German Benedictine theologian and canonist
- Ellert Schram (1939–2025), Icelandic footballer and politician
- Frederick Schram (born 1943), American palaeontologist and carcinologist
- Jacob Schram (1870–1952) (1870–1952), Norwegian businessman
- Jessy Schram (born 1986), American actress
- Ken Schram (1947–2014), American broadcaster
- Magnús Orri Schram (born 1972), Icelandic politician
- Stuart R. Schram (1924–2012), American physicist, political scientist and sinologist
- Tessa Schram (born 1988), Dutch actress and director
- Thomas Schram (1882–1950), Norwegian physician
- Volckert Schram (c. 1620–1673), 17th-century Dutch admiral
- Frederik Schram (born 1995), Danish-born Icelandic footballer

== See also ==
- Schramm (disambiguation)
- Schramme
