= Kari Garmann =

Norwegian politician (born 1945–2026)

Kari Garmann (née Gram; 16 June 1945 – 7 February 2026) was a Norwegian politician for the Conservative Party.

She was born in Oslo as a daughter of barrister Peder "Per" Gram and alpine skier Johanne "Hannemor" Gram, née Dybwad. Her paternal grandparents were physician Harald Mathias "Mads" Gram and art historian Irma Ingertha Schram. Her maternal grandfather was barrister Nils Juell Dybwad; great-grandparents Vilhelm Dybwad and Johanne Dybwad.

She finished her secondary education in 1964 and Oslo Commerce School in 1965. She graduated from the University of Oslo with the cand.polit. degree in 1973. She worked as a consultant in Oslo Municipality from 1972, then from 1976 to 1980 as a secretary for the Oslo Conservative Party's city council group.

She was a member of Oslo city council from 1979 to 1987, spending six years as a deputy member of the executive committee. She was elected as a deputy representative to the Parliament of Norway from Oslo in 1985, and was re-elected as such in 1989. She twice served as a regular member of Parliament, first moving up to fill the seat of Kåre Willoch who led Willoch's Second Cabinet and later for Kristin Clemet who was a member of Syse's Cabinet.

In 1991 she took an MBA at the BI Norwegian Business School. From 1992 to 1995 she was the director of Norges Postbank, then an independent consultant in Scandinavian Management Consultants. From 2004 to her retirement in 2012 she was a secretary in the organization Oslo Region.

Garmann has been a board member of Diakonhjemmet Hospital from 1984 to 1988 and Oslo Bolig- og Sparelag from 1987. She has also been a programme councillor for NRK Østlandssendingen from 1984 to 1987.
