= Jacob Schram (1870–1952) =

Norwegian businessperson

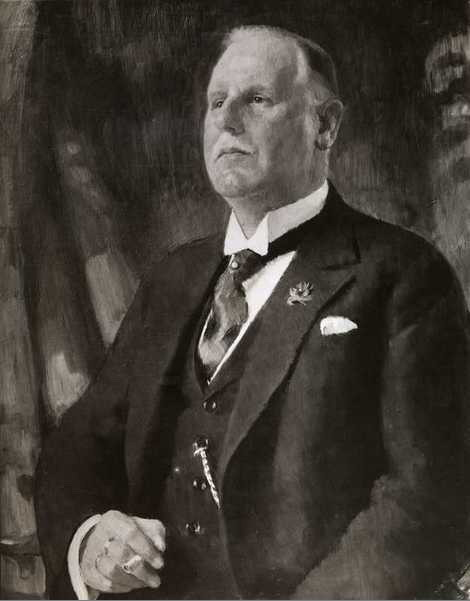
Jacob Christian Just Schram (1927 painting)

Jacob Christian Just Schram (30 June 1870 – 19 September 1952) was a Norwegian businessperson.

== Personal life ==
He was born in Kristiania as a son of wholesaler Thomas Andreas Schram (1835–1890) and Mathilde Just (1850–1901). He was a brother of art historian Irma Schram and physician Thomas Schram, and thus a brother-in-law of Mads Gram and Constance Wiel Schram. Another sister Elisabeth was married to Johan Fredrik Gram, a brother of Mads Gram.

In 1895 he married Antoinette Augusta Boeck (1871—1939). Their daughter Beth Schram (1897–1989) married artist Dagfin Werenskiold, a brother of scientist Werner Werenskiold and son of painter Erik Werenskiold. Their son Thomas Boeck Schram took over the family company, and also became co-owner of Oslo Havnelager.

== Career ==
He finished Kristiania Commerce School before being hired in his father's company Schram & Co in 1890, where he became owner in 1895. The company was located at Sjursøya and traded in herring, stockfish and salt.

From 1924 to 1927 he chaired Oslo Handelsstands Forening. He was a board member of Oslo Havnelager since 1919 as well as Oslo Staniol- og Metalkapselfabrik, and supervisory council member of Bergens Privatbank. He was a consul for Denmark from 1908 to 1916 and consul-general for Austria from 1920 to 1924. He was also a member of the administrative committee and head of the fisheries department at the 1914 Jubilee Exhibition, and a known philanthropist.

He was decorated as a Commander, Second Class of the Order of the Dannebrog. He resided at Lysaker, died in September 1952 and was buried in Vår Frelsers gravlund. A portrait of him was commissioned by Oslo Handelsstands Forening and painted by his father-in-law Erik Werenskiold in 1927.
