= Johan Wollebæk =

Norwegian diplomat (1875–1940)

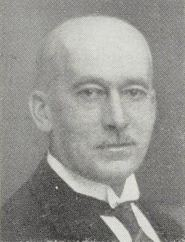
- Born: 16 November 1875; Lier, Norway
- Died: 24 October 1940 (aged 64)
- Occupations: jurist and diplomat
- Relatives: Alf Wollebæk (brother)

Johan Herman Wollebæk (16 November 1875 – 24 October 1940) was a Norwegian jurist and diplomatist. He worked with international law, and is known for his time as leader of the Norwegian legation in Stockholm from 1921 to October 1940, a period which includes the early phase of World War II.

== Personal life ==
He was born in Lier as the son of Colonel Sigvard Polidor Wollebæk (1835–1920) and his wife Anine Julie Augusta Dahl (1834–1912). He was the brother of zoologist Alf Wollebæk, and on the maternal side he was a descendant of Carl Adolph Dahl and Carl Adolf Dahl.

In December 1912 he married Ida Fredrikke Gram (1880–1967), a daughter of the former Prime Minister Gregers Winther Wulfsberg Gram. Through his wife, he was the brother-in-law of Harald Gram and uncle of Gregers Gram.

== Career ==
Wollebæk went to school in Drammen and Lillehammer. He finished his secondary school in 1893, and graduated from the University of Kristiania with the cand.jur. degree in 1898. He began his career in the foreign service a few years later, as a secretary in the Ministry of Trade. His first assignment abroad came while the Union between Sweden and Norway still existed, as an attaché at the two countries' legation in Paris. Following the dissolution of the union in 1905, Norway established its own Ministry of Foreign Affairs, and he was promoted to subdirector in 1909 and deputy under-secretary of state in 1916.

He worked with international law, as chairman of Sjøgrensekommisjonen, and delegate to the Spitsbergen conferences in 1912 and 1914. He was minister (leader) of the Norwegian legation in Berlin from 1920 to 1921, and in 1921 he was given the same position the Norwegian legation in Stockholm, following the death of Francis Hagerup. He remained here until 1940.

Following 9 April 1940, when Norway was invaded and subsequently occupied by Nazi Germany, Stockholm became an important city for Norwegian politics. Wollebæk had refused to obey the orders of Vidkun Quisling—who during the German invasion declared a Fascist coup d'état—and the Norwegian legation in Stockholm was soon reinforced with additional personnel. Jens Bull, the highest-ranking civil servant in the Ministry of Foreign Affairs, was sent to Stockholm, and the Norwegian government-in-exile, once secure in London, sent its representatives. Wollebæk participated in negotiations in the summer of 1940, but at the same time he fell ill. He died in October 1940, being succeeded by Jens Bull. Before the war ended, more than 50,000 Norwegians had fled to Sweden.

Wollebæk was decorated as a Commander of the Royal Norwegian Order of St. Olav in 1922. He received the Grand Cross of the Swedish Order of the Polar Star and the Spanish Order of Isabella the Catholic, and was Commander of the Danish Order of the Dannebrog and the Swedish Order of Vasa.
