= Groeger =

Groeger is a surname. Notable people with the surname include:

- Lena Groeger, American investigative journalist, graphic designer, and news application developer
- Peter Groeger (1933–2018), German actor, director, and voice actor

== See also ==
- Greger
