= Irma Ingertha Gram =

Norwegian art historian

Irma Ingertha Gram (née Schram; 21 December 1873 – 22 November 1945) was a Norwegian art historian.

== Personal life ==
She was born in Kristiania as a daughter of Thomas Andreas Schram (1835–1890) and Mathilde Just (1850–1901). She was a sister of businessperson Jacob Schram and physician Thomas Schram, and thus sister-in-law of Constance Wiel Schram.

In September 1907 she married physician Harald Mathias "Mads" Gram, a son of Jens Gram and maternal grandson of P. A. Munch. Her older sister Elisabeth had already married Mads' brother Johan Fredrik Gram.

Mads and Irma's son Peder "Per" Gram became a barrister and married alpine skier Johanne "Hannemor" Dybwad, a daughter of Niels Juell Dybwad and granddaughter of Johanne Dybwad. They had the daughter Kari Garmann.

== Career ==
As an art historian, Gram published books on ancient bobbin lace; De gamle kniplingers historie (1921), and a book on etiquette; Litt om skikk og bruk før og nu (1929). She was employed at the Norwegian Museum of Cultural History from 1903 to 1907. She also profiled several royals for a Norwegian audience, in Dronning Christina av Sverige (1924, about Christina I of Sweden), and Catharina av Medici (1927, about Catherine de' Medici). She also contributed to the press and to Norwegian Broadcasting Corporation radio.

She was also a board member of Læseforening for kvinder from 1921. She died in November 1945.
