= Schrom =

Schröm or Schrom is a German surname. Notable people with the surname include:

- Ed Schrom (1911–1980), American politician and farmer
- F. W. Schröder-Schrom (1879–1956), German actor
- Ken Schrom (born 1954), American former major league baseball pitcher
- Michael Schrom, American racing driver
- Oliver Schröm (born 1964), German investigative journalist

== See also ==
- Šrom
- Schram
- Schromm
