= Schramm (surname) =

Schramm is a German surname derived from the a nickname Schram, Schramme ('scratch, scar, wound'). It may also be derived from the settlement named Schramm. Notable people with the surname include:

== People with the surname ==
=== Acting ===
- David Schramm (actor) (1946–2020), played Roy Biggins in the TV series Wings
- Ernst Gerold Schramm (1938–2004), German baritone
- Günther Schramm (born 1929), German actor
- Karla Schramm (1891–1980), American actress
- Marie-Luise Schramm (born 1984), German actress
- Paula Schramm (born 1989), German actress

=== Art and music ===
- Anna Schramm (1835–1916), German opera singer
- Dave Schramm (musician), former lead guitarist for Yo La Tengo
- Felix Schramm (born 1970), German artist
- Georg Schramm (born 1949), German psychologist and Kabarett artist
- Margit Schramm (1935–1996), German soprano in operetta, opera and song
- Werner Schramm (1898–1970), German painter

=== Business ===
- Buford John "B.J." Schramm (1938–2004), American businessman and developer of light personal helicopters
- Carl Schramm, American businessman

=== Mathematics and science ===
- David Schramm (astrophysicist) (1945–1997), American expert on the big bang theory and dark matter
- Jacob R. Schramm (1885–1976), American botanist
- Oded Schramm (1961–2008), Israeli-American mathematician
- Vern L. Schramm (born 1941), American biochemist and professor at Albert Einstein College of Medicine

=== Politics ===
- Astrid Schramm (born 1956), German politician
- Bill Schramm (1886–1962), New Zealand politician
- Hilde Schramm (born 1936), former leader of the German Green Party

=== Sport ===
- Beate Schramm (born 1966), German rower
- Claudia Schramm (born 1975), German bobsledder
- Dave Schramm (American football) (born 1963), American college football player and assistant coach
- Norbert Schramm (born 1960), German figure skater
- Ricky Schramm (born 1985), American soccer player
- Tex Schramm (1920–2003), American president and manager of the Dallas Cowboys football team

=== Other ===
- Augustin Schramm (1907–1948), German-Czech intelligence agent
- Gert Schramm (1928–2016), German African-American concentration camp survivor
- Jean-Paul, comte de Schramm (1789–1884), French general
- Percy Ernst Schramm (1894–1970), German historian of the Holy Roman Empire
- Peter W. Schramm (1946–2015), American academic at Ashland University
- Wilbur Schramm (1907–1987), American communications researcher

== See also ==
- Schram (disambiguation), in some cases an alternative spelling
- Schramme
