= Thomas Schram =

Norwegian physician (1882–1950)

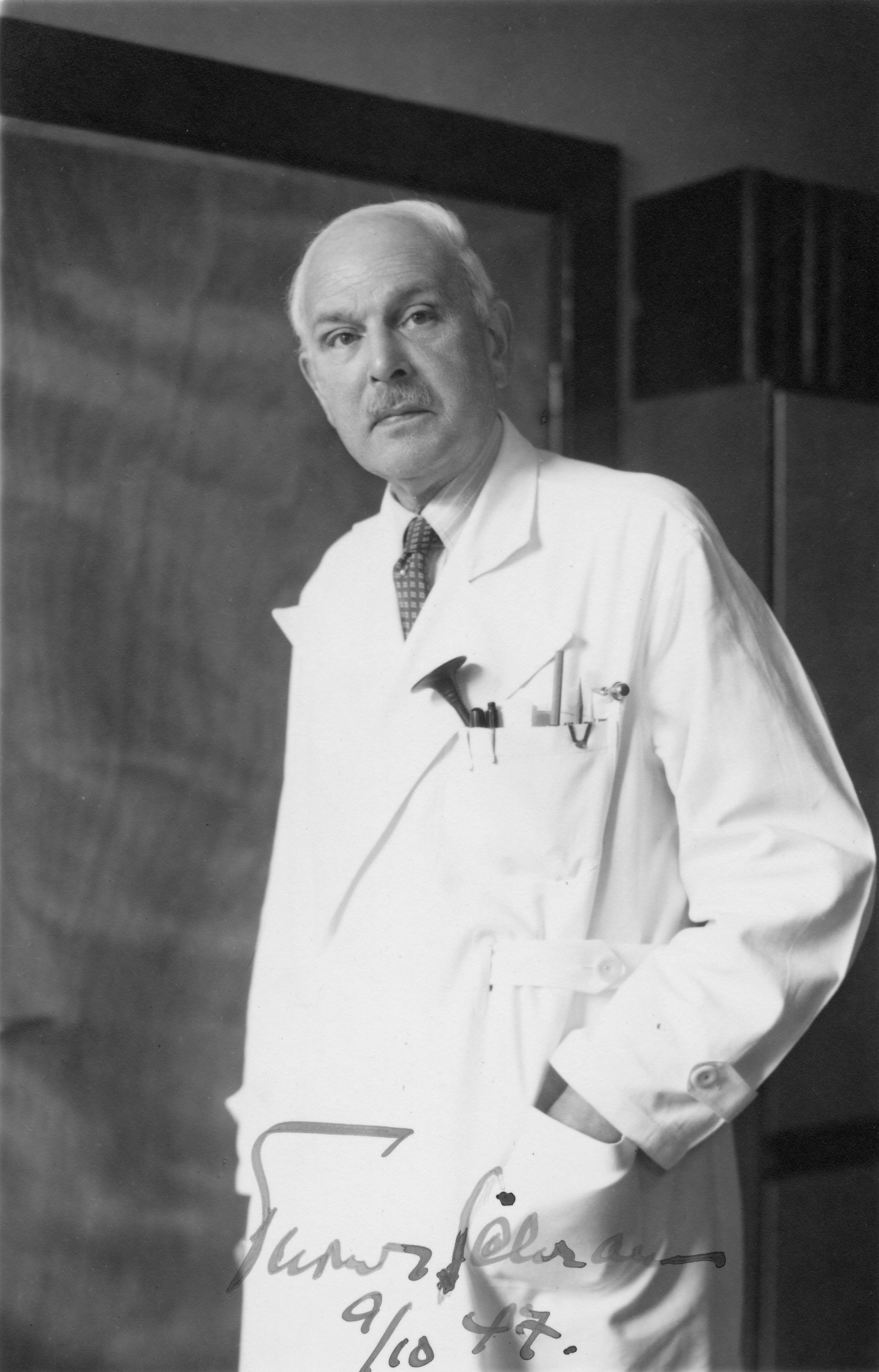
Thomas Schram at Ringvål sanatorium in 1947

Thomas Andreas Finn Schram (9 October 1882 – 15 July 1950) was a Norwegian physician, best known for his endeavor against tuberculosis.

== Personal life ==
He was born in Kristiania as a son of wholesaler Thomas Andreas Schram (1835–1890) and Mathilde Just (1850–1901). He was a brother of businessperson Jacob Schram and art historian Irma Schram, and thus a brother-in-law of Mads Gram. Another sister Elisabeth was married to Johan Fredrik Gram, a brother of Mads Gram.

In 1912 he married writer Constance Wiel Nygaard (1890–1955), a daughter of book publisher William Martin Nygaard and sister of book publisher Mads Wiel Nygaard.

== Career ==
He finished his secondary education in 1901 and graduated from the Royal Frederick University with the cand.med. degree in 1909. He was a candidate at Ullevål Hospital from 1910 to 1911, then moved to Western Norway as assisting physician at Lyster Sanatorium. Before the end of the year 1912 he became municipal physician in Grytten Municipality and Hen Municipality. From 1914 to 1915 he studied under Brauer in Eppendorf and Friedrich von Müller in Munich.

In 1916 he became reserve physician at Landeskogen Sanatorium, the first state sanatorium for tuberculosis. He went on to the tuberculosis department of Kristiania Health Council in 1918, then became chief physician at Vensmoen Tuberculosis Sanatorium in 1921 and Ringvål Tuberculosis Sanatorium in 1935. He retired in 1947. He became a board member of Den norske nationalforening mot tuberkulose in 1922 and the specialist board in the Norwegian Medical Association in 1932. He later chaired Norske Lægers Tuberkuloseselskap from 1945, having served as a board member since 1935.

He was decorated as a Knight, First Class of the Order of St. Olav in 1947. Schram, who lived in Halden Municipality in his later life, died in Trondheim in July 1950 and was buried at Vår Frelsers gravlund.
