= Šrom =

Šrom (feminine: Šromová) is a Czech surname. It was probably derived drom the verb šromotit (dialectal form of the word šramotit, meaning 'to rustle'). Notable people with the surname include:

- Hana Šromová (born 1978), Czech tennis player
- Michal Šrom (born 1987), Czech footballer
- Vojtěch Šrom (born 1988), Czech footballer

== See also ==
- Schrom
