= Hypericum ellipticifolium =

Scientific classification
- Kingdom: Plantae
- Clade: Tracheophytes
- Clade: Angiosperms
- Clade: Eudicots
- Clade: Rosids
- Order: Malpighiales
- Family: Hypericaceae
- Genus: Hypericum
- Species: H. ellipticifolium

Binomial name
- Hypericum ellipticifolium H.L.Li

Synonyms
- Lianthus ellipticifolius (H.L.Li) N.Robson

Species of flowering plant

Hypericum ellipticifolium is a species of flowering plant in the family Hypericaceae. It was formerly included in the genus Lianthus, which was described by Norman Robson in 2001. It is native to southern China.
