= Alf Wollebæk =

Norwegian zoologist and curator

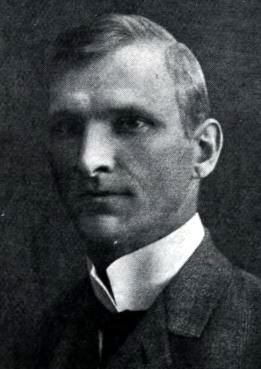
- Born: 8 January 1879; Lier, Norway
- Died: 9 March 1960 (aged 81); Oslo, Norway
- Occupations: zoologist, curator
- Employer: Natural History Museum at the University of Oslo
- Relatives: Johan Wollebæk (brother); Carl Frølich Hanssen (brother-in-law)

Alf Wollebæk (8 January 1879 – 9 March 1960) was a Norwegian zoologist and curator who made contributions to the study of marine and Arctic fauna. Born in Lier, Norway, to a military father, Wollebæk spent most of his professional career at the Natural History Museum at the University of Oslo, where he worked from 1908 until his retirement in 1949. He is particularly renowned for leading the Norwegian Zoological Expedition to the Galápagos Islands in 1925, during which he collected over 500 specimens and established the archipelago's first biological station on Floreana island. Throughout his career, Wollebæk published numerous scientific papers and popular books on Norwegian wildlife, including works on reptiles, mammals, and fish, while also maintaining a regular column in a scientific magazine. His contributions to zoology were recognized internationally, with the Galápagos sea lion being named Zalophus wollebaeki in his honour, and he received several prestigious awards including the King's Medal of Merit in gold in 1959, just a year before his death in Oslo.

== Personal life ==
Wollebæk was born in Lier to colonel Sigurd Polidor Wollebæk (1835–1920) and his wife Anine Julie Augusta Dahl (1834–1912). His elder brother was jurist and diplomatist Johan Wollebæk (1875–1940). He was married twice; first in 1903 to Agnes Hanssen (1879–1930; sister of sports executive Carl Frølich Hanssen), and in 1932 to Ruth Jensen (1891–1958).

== Career ==
After graduating in Fredrikstad in 1898, he received a job at the experimental station in Drøbak with marine biologist Johan Hjort (1869–1948). From 1900 to 1907 he was a zoologist at the Society of Norwegian Fisheries Promotion in Bergen. Wollebæk was assigned with Bergens Museum from 1907, and with the Natural History Museum at the University of Oslo from 1908 to 1949. By the end of 1925, Wollebæk's team had amassed over 500 Galápagos specimens, including 239 bird skins (38 species), 84 reptiles (tortoises, iguanas, lizards and geckos) and a vast array of invertebrates (crustaceans, molluscs, insects, arachnids and more), which greatly enriched the Zoological Museum’s holdings in Oslo.

His publications centered on marine and Arctic fauna. In 1922 he started publishing a column in the magazine Nyt Magazin for Naturvidenskaberne ("Contributions from the Zoological Museum"). His books include Norges krybdyr og padder (1918), Norges pattedyr (1921), Norges fisker (1924), På tokt til Vestindia (1932), and De forheksede øer (1934). He was decorated Commander of the Latvian Order of the Three Stars in 1937, and with the King's Medal of Merit in gold in 1959.

== Galápagos expedition ==
In 1925, Wollebæk was appointed director of the Norwegian Zoological Expedition to the Galápagos Islands, together with the museum preparator Erling R. Hansen. After exploring the West Indies and mainland Colombia, the expedition spent five months (July–December 1925) making detailed biological observations on five Galápagos islands. Wollebæk and his team collected over 500 specimens, published more than 20 papers and books on their findings, and described or reclassified a number of new taxa, most famously the Galápagos sea lion, Zalophus wollebaeki, which was named in his honour.

The expedition also erected what proved to be the archipelago's first biological station at Post Office Bay on Floreana Island. Built of local lava blocks (walls two to three blocks thick enclosing a 3 × 4 metre laboratory), the "lava house" was intended as a permanent field station and repository for specimens; its ruins still stand.
