= Finn Qvale =

Norwegian officer, cartographer and sports leader

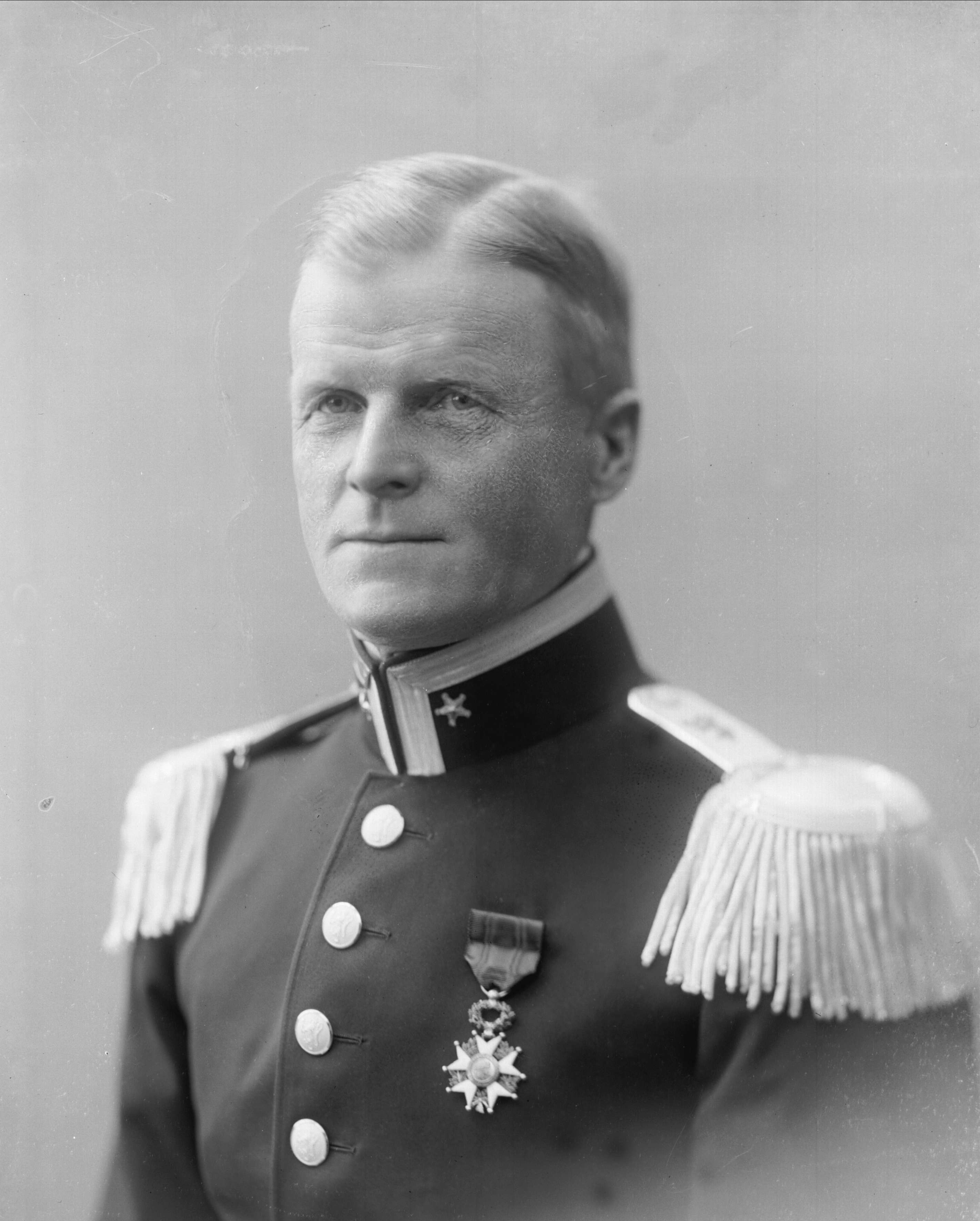
Finn Qvale in 1918

Finn Qvale (18 April 1873 – 20 January 1955) was a Norwegian military officer, cartographer, and sports official.

He was born in Flesberg, finished his secondary education in 1891, and graduated as an officer in 1894. He attended the Norwegian Military College. He worked in the Norwegian Geographical Survey from 1897 to 1918, and issued several maps of different places in Eastern Norway. He led the Infantry Winter School from its establishment in 1923 to 1938, having reached the rank of major in 1918.

Qvale chaired the Association for the Promotion of Skiing from 1924 to 1937. He was a board member in the Norwegian Trekking Association and the Norwegian Association of Hunters and Anglers. He was decorated as a Commander of the Order of St. Olav. He died at Rikshospitalet in January 1955. He was buried at Vestre gravlund.

Sporting positions
Preceded by Fredrik Juell (secretary); O. T. Klingenberg (manager)	Secretary of the Association for the Promotion of Skiing; 1907–1910 (Victor Haxthow wasmanager until 1908)	Succeeded by Kristian Vilhelm Amundsen
Preceded by S. Chr. Sommerfeldt	Chairman of the Association for the Promotion of Skiing; 1924–1937	Succeeded by Nils Juell Dybwad
