= Thorstein Lambrechts =

Thorstein Aschehoug Lambrechts (6 October 1856 – 11 May 1933) was a Norwegian bookseller.

== Biography ==
Lambrechts was born in the village of Kråkstad in Akershus, Norway. He was a son of veterinarian Bernhard Gabrielsen Lambrechts (1828-1907) and Karin Bolette Aschehoug (1831–1907). He was a nephew of Torkel Halvorsen Aschehoug. In 1891, he married Mischa Dreyer.

After Latin school and commerce school he spent his career in the book store Aschehougs Boghandel from 1880 to 1928. He took over the parent company H. Aschehoug & Co in 1888 together with William Martin Nygaard. In 1900 Nygaard withdrew from the bookselling side of the business. Lambrechts subsequently operated the bookstore until 1928 when it was purchased by Johan Grundt Tanum (1891-1978). He became vice chairman of the Norwegian Booksellers Association in 1891, and chaired the organization from 1903 to 1919.

He was also a member of Kristiania city council, Kristiania chamber of commerce and the supervisory council of Oslo Sparebank and Nationaltheatret. He died in May 1933.
