= Greger (given name) =

Greger is a given name. Notable people with the given name include:

- Greger Andrijevski (born 1973), Swedish footballer
- Greger Artursson (born 1972), Swedish ice hockey player
- Greger Falk (1910–1990), Swedish Air Force major general
- Greger Forslöw (born 1961), Swedish fencer
- Greger Larson, evolutionary geneticist
- Greger Lewenhaupt (1920–2008), equestrian

== See also ==
- Greger, surname
- Gregers, another given name
