= William Martin Nygaard =

Norwegian publisher and politician

William M. Nygaard
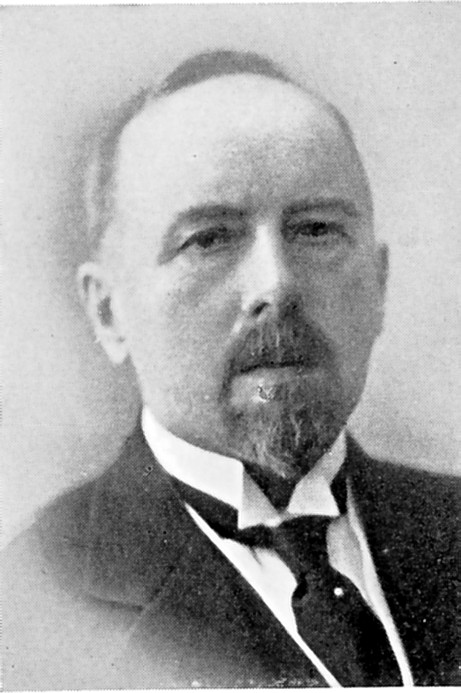
- Born: William Martin Nygaard; 6 February 1865; Kristiansand, Norway
- Died: 19 December 1952 (aged 87)
- Occupations: Publisher and politician

William Martin Nygaard (6 February 1865 – 19 December 1952) was a Norwegian publisher and politician.

== Personal life ==
Nygaard was born in Kristiansand as the son of educator and linguist Marius Nygaard (1838–1912) and his wife Elisabeth "Elise" Martin (1842–1923) and brother of Kristen Brunfeldt Nygaard and Finn Nygaard. He married Constance Wiel, and the couple had seven children, among them Mads Wiel Nygaard, who was the father of William Nygaard, and Andreas Melchior Wiel Nygaard. Their daughter Constance Wiel Nygaard married physician Thomas Schram.

In 1894 he bought Drammensveien 99 and moved in with his family. It is in the garden outside Drammensveien 99 the annual garden party of Aschehoug takes place each summer.

== Publisher ==
He was employed in H. Aschehoug & Co's bookstore in Kristiania in 1887. In 1888, together with Thorstein Lambrechts, he bought the bookstore and the publishing house. Then, in 1900 he became the sole owner of the publishing house and changed the name of the company to H. Aschehoug & Co (W. Nygaard). He was chief executive of the publishing house until 1940 when his son Mads Wiel Nygaard took over as chief executive. William Martin Nygaard continued as chairman of the board.

In 1895 William Nygaard initiated the founding of the Norwegian Publishers Association, serving as chairman from 1895 to 1922 and 1925 to 1929.

== Politician ==
William Nygaard was a member of Kristiania city council from 1908 to 1919. In 1910 he was one of the founders of the political party Liberal Left Party, chairing the local chapter in Kristiania until 1916. He was a central board member of the party from 1912 to 1915. He was elected to the Parliament of Norway in 1921 for the term 1922–1924, representing the constituency Kristiania. He served only one term. He had previously been elected as deputy representative from Hammersborg in 1915. He also fielded as the Liberal Left candidate in Uranienborg in the 1912 election, but only carried 81 votes and lost spectacularly.

He was also a member of the board of Oslo City Museum (1902–1922), the Norwegian Booksellers Association (1905–1918), Saugbrugsforeningen (1914–1932), Christiania Bank og Kreditkasse (1917–1922), Nationaltheatret (1922–1923), Vinmonopolet (1929–1932) and the Norwegian Museum of Decorative Arts and Design.
