= Hui-lin Li =

Chinese botanist (1911–2002)

Hui-lin Li (李惠林, 1911–2002) was a Chinese botanist, academic, and researcher who worked at the University of Pennsylvania, National Taiwan University, and Chinese Academy of Sciences.

== Biography ==
Hui-lin Li was born in Soochow, a city close to Shanghai. Li earned Biology degrees from Soochow University (B.S., 1930) and Yenching University (M.S., 1932). In 1940, he traveled to the United States, and earned a Ph.D. in Biology from Harvard University in 1942. From 1943 to 1946 Li studied under Francis W. Pennell and Jacob R. Schramm at the Academy of Natural Sciences of Philadelphia. Li was appointed to a professorship at Soochow University in 1946 and at National Taiwan University in Taipei in 1947. He returned to the United States and carried out research at the University of Virginia in 1950, the Smithsonian Institution in 1951, and the Morris Arboretum of the University of Pennsylvania in 1952. In 1958 Li joined the faculty at the University of Pennsylvania, where he remained until retiring in 1979. The collected Hui-lin Li Papers are archived at the University of Pennsylvania.

== Selected publications ==
From 1932 to 1983, Hui-lin Li published over 200 papers and 9 books. Some notable books are:

- (1952) Floristic Relationships Between Eastern Asia and Eastern North America
- (1959) The Garden Flowers of China
- (1963) The Origin and Cultivation of Shade and Ornamental Trees
- (1972) Trees of Pennsylvania: the Atlantic States and the Lake States
- (1982) Contributions to Botany: Studies in Plant Geography, Phylogeny and Evolution, Ethnobotany and Dendrological and Horticultural Botany
- (2002) Chinese Flower Arrangement.

Li was chair of the editorial committee and a contributor to the (1975-1979) Flora of Taiwan, and the first translator of the c. 304 Nanfang Caomu Zhuang "Plants of the Southern Regions" (1979).

== Awards and honors ==
Li was awarded a Harrison Fellowship for Research at the University of Pennsylvania in 1943, a Guggenheim Fellowship in 1961, and a Fulbright Fellowship in 1968. He won research grants from institutions such as the American Philosophical Society and American Council of Learned Societies. Li was elected a member of the Academia Sinica, Taiwan in 1964, and was a visiting Professor of Biology at the Chinese University of Hong Kong from 1964 to 1965.
