= Jacob Dybwad =

Norwegian bookseller and publisher

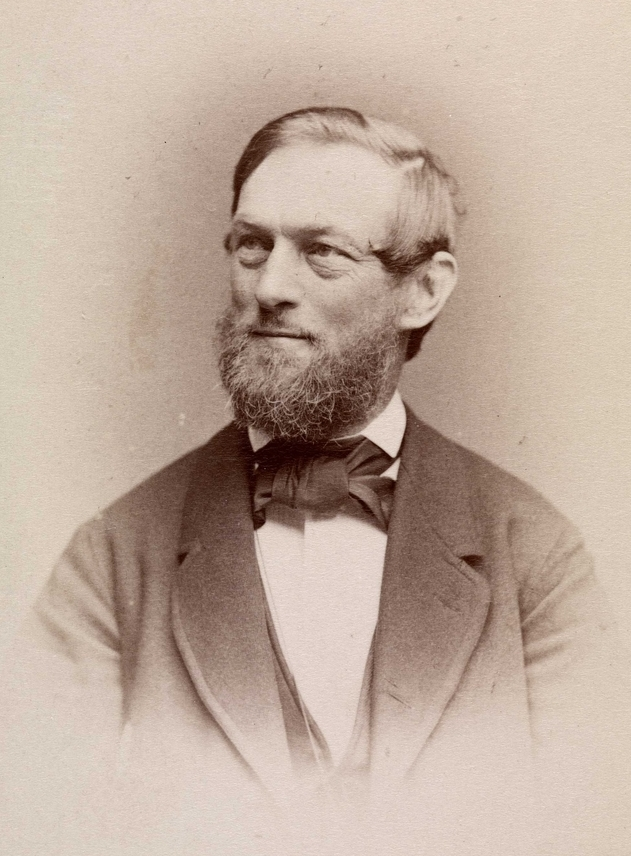
- Born: 20 July 1823; Vækerø in Aker, Norway
- Died: 4 September 1899 (aged 76)
- Occupations: Bookseller and publisher
- Spouses: Anna Margrethe Grøntvedt Aabel; Ingeborg Krog
- Children: Vilhelm Dybwad
- Awards: Order of St. Olav

Jacob Dybwad (20 July 1823 – 4 September 1899) was a Norwegian bookseller and publisher as well as a pioneer in the publishing trade. Dybwad was one of the founders of the publishing company and bookstore Jacob Dybwad A/S, which was in operation from 1852 until 1987.

== Background ==
He was born at Vækerø in Aker, Norway. He was the son of Jacob Erasmus Dybwad (1792–1854) and Christiane Lange (1795–1885). His father was an attorney and later a merchant. Jacob Dybwad received his examen artium from Møllers Institute in 1844. To further his education, he traveled to Berlin and later in Leipzig and Paris.

== Career ==
His older brother, Christopher Andreas Dybwad (1810–1892) had opened a publishing shop in Christiania (now Oslo) which was acquired by Guldberg & Dzwonkowski in 1848. Dybwad joined the firm and in 1852, when the publisher was sold, Dybwad took over the bookstore. Dybwad's bookstore was located centrally at Stortorvet in Oslo. Dybwad made close contact with the university and in 1858 became commissioner for the writings of the newly established Science Society in Christiania (now the Norwegian Academy of Sciences). From 1870 he became a supplier to the library at University of Christiania (now University of Oslo).

Professional textbooks and religious literature took place among the publications. Dybwad was the publisher of the Norwegian almanac from 1877, and of Nordahl Rolfsen's readers for primary school in the 1890s. He played a central role when the Norwegian Bookstores Association was founded in 1851. He was a member of the board of directors from 1853 until 1896.

== Personal life ==
In June 1853 he married Anna Margrethe Grøntvedt Aabel (1831–1873), daughter of vicar Peter Pavels Aabel. After the death of his first wife, he married Ingeborg Krog (1850–1930), daughter of vicar Lorentz Ditlev Krog, in October 1876.

He had several children. His son Peter Dybwad (1859–1921) became a well-known architect, Bertram Dybwad and Christian Dybwad became booksellers. Knut Sømme Dybwad and Vilhelm Dybwad became barristers. Actresses Elsa Randulff Dybwad and Johanne Dybwad were married into the family. In the next generation, Jacob Dybwad was a grandfather of Nils Juell Dybwad and Jacob Dybwad (1890–1966).

He was appointed Knight of the Order of St. Olav in 1897. Jacob Dybwad died in 1899 and was buried at Vår Frelsers gravlund in Oslo.

== Other sources ==
- Haakon B. Nielson (1977) Jacob Dybwad 125 år: Glimt av forlagets og bokhandelens historie (Oslo: Dybwad) ISBN 978-8290014068
