= Schramm =

Schramm may refer to:

- Schramm (film), a 1993 film about Lothar Schramm, the "lipstick killer"
- Schramm Inc. (founded 1900), a U.S. manufacturer of drilling equipment
- Schramm (surname), people with the surname Schramm

== See also ==
- Schram (disambiguation)
- Schramm Park State Recreation Area, in Sarpy County, Nebraska, U.S.
- 113952 Schramm (discovered 2002), a main-belt minor planet
- Schramm–Loewner evolution, a stochastic process in probability theory
