= Norwegian Employers' Confederation =

The Norwegian Employers' Confederation (Norwegian: Norsk Arbeidsgiverforening, NAF) was an employers' organisation in Norway.

It existed between 1900 and 1989, and was founded as an answer to the foundation of the Workers' National Trade Union in 1899. Jens Gram and Hans William Schrøder have been credited with taking the initiative. In 1989 it became a part of the Confederation of Norwegian Enterprise through a merger.
