= Gyda Gram =

Norwegian painter (1851–1906)

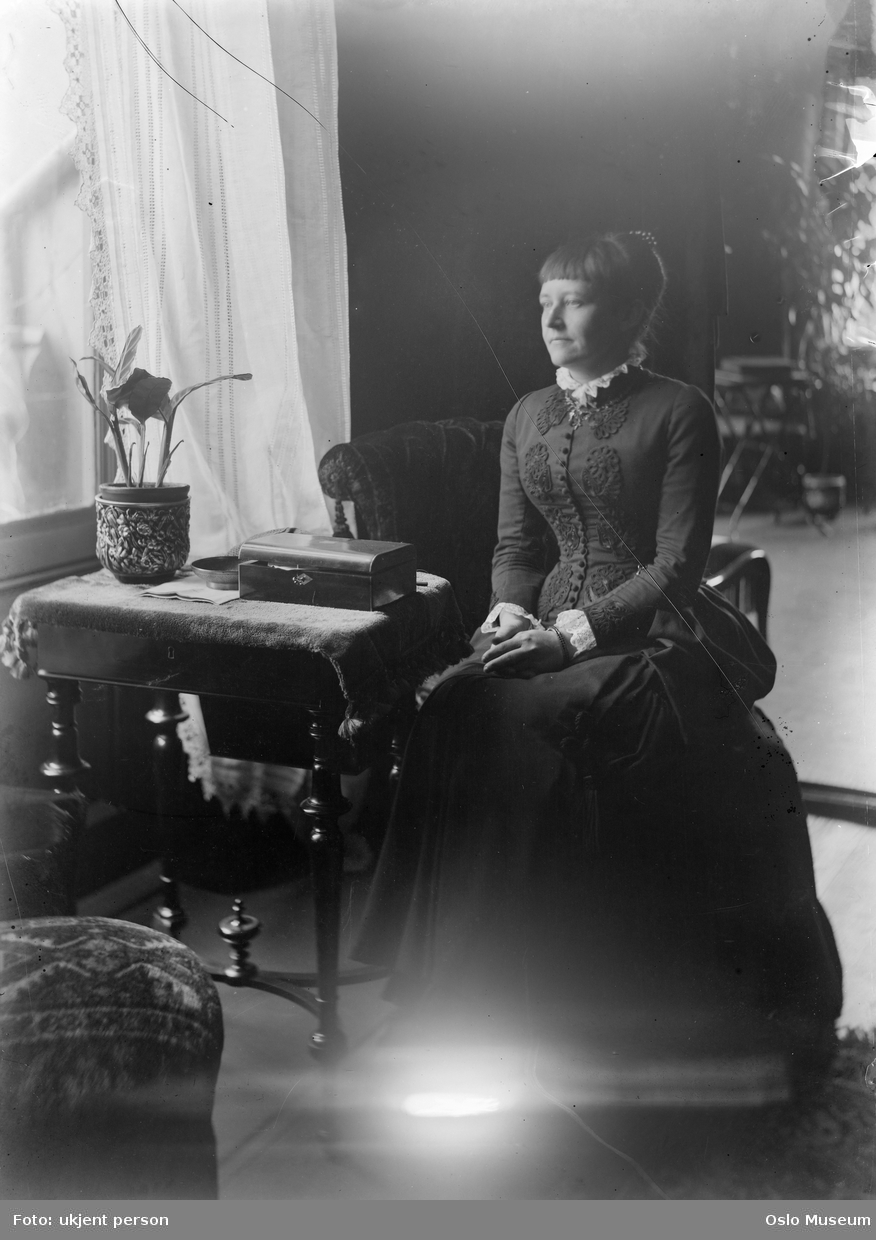
- Born: Gyda Dahm; 20 November 1851; Eidsvoll, Akershus, Norway
- Died: 3 November 1906 (aged 54); Drammen, Buskerud, Norway
- Occupation: Painter

Gyda Gram (née Dahm; 20 November 1851 – 3 November 1906) was a Norwegian painter.

== Early and personal life ==
Gyda Dahm was born on 20 November 1851 in Eidsvoll to Anneken Lovise Pehrson and district doctor Jacob Christian Dahm. On 17 June 1876, she married lumber merchant and consul Carl Gram, a brother of artist Andrea Gram, in Kongsberg. They had no children.

== Career ==
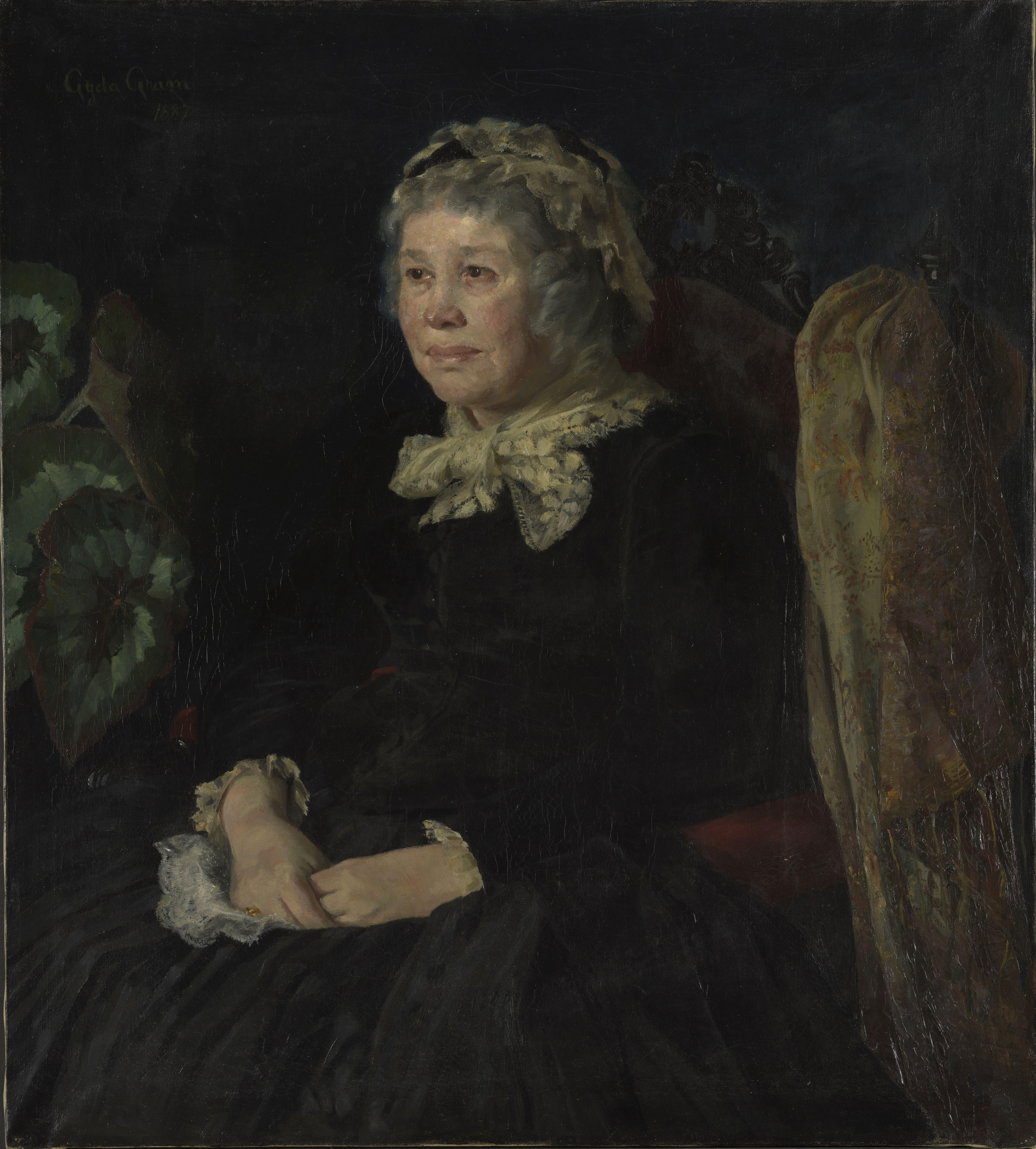
"Portrait of an Elderly Lady" painted by Gram in 1887

From 1872 to 1874, she was a student at Knud Bergslien's school of painting. While at the school, she befriended fellow artist Harriet Backer and together the pair travelled to Munich, where they shared a flat together. However, the pair struggled to find a teacher, before being recommended Lambert Linder. Gram was his pupil between 1874 and 1875.

After her marriage in 1876, she lived in Drammen, where she hosted a "general Munich dinner", where people gathered from across the world. Artists Eilif Peterssen and Backer were among the attendees.

Gram was not that productive as an artist until after her husband died in 1897, before that she mainly painted family portraits. As a widow, she travelled to Paris during the 1890s, which inspired her future work. Her art production increased, producing more landscapes and portraits. Her first solo exhibition was at Drammens Kunstforening in 1903, but she had to soon give up further work due to poor eyesight.

She was a member of the Drammen Exhibition in 1901 and the following year, was one of the founders of Drammen and Oplands Craft Association and served as a board member. As well as contributing patterns to the association.

== Death ==
Gram died on 6 November 1906 in Drammen, at the age of 54.
