= Vilhelm Dybwad =

Norwegian barrister and writer

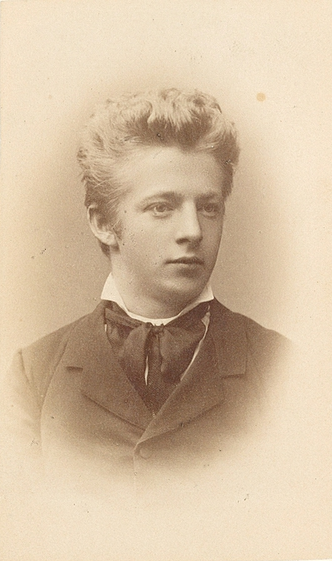
- Dybwad in 1882
- Born: 12 February 1863; Christiania, Norway
- Died: 16 March 1950 (aged 87)
- Occupations: barrister and writer
- Spouses: Johanne Juell (m. 1891; div. 1916) Bokken Lasson (m. 1916)
- Children: Nils Juell Dybwad
- Parent(s): Jacob Dybwad; Anne Margrethe Grøntvedt Aabel
- Relatives: Hannemor Gram (granddaughter)

Vilhelm Dybwad (12 February 1863 – 16 March 1950) was a Norwegian barrister and writer. He wrote comedies, revues and songs. In his later years he wrote several books of memoirs from his life as a lawyer.

== Personal life ==
Dybwad was born in Christiania as the son of bookseller Jacob Dybwad (1823–1899) and Anne Margrethe Grøntvedt Aabel (1831–1873). He was a brother of architect Peter Dybwad. He was married to actress Johanne Dybwad from 1891 to 1916, and to singer Bokken Lasson from August 1916. Both his wives are honoured with sculptures in Oslo.

His son with Johanne, Nils Juell Dybwad, became a barrister. Nils married a sister of Carl Boye Semb and had the daughter Johanne "Hannemor" Dybwad, an alpine skier who married barrister Peder "Per" Gram.

== Career ==
He finished his secondary education in 1881, and graduated from the Royal Frederick University with the cand.jur. degree in 1886. After studying in Berlin and Paris, he was a junior solicitor in Kristiania for two years. In 1890 he opened his own lawyer's office, and from 1892 he was a barrister with access to working with Supreme Court cases.

While studying he had written and played in the Norwegian Students' Society theatre. He later translated and wrote plays and operettes for Christiania Theater, Nationaltheatret and Centralteatret. Among his best known works is the musical comedy Ola Lia, written together with Olaf Krohn and staged in 1905 with Hauk Aabel in the leading role. The farce Verdens undergang followed in 1906 and Sterke Mænd in 1907, both at Centralteatret. After marrying Bokken Lasson in 1916, he started writing revue and cabarets for Chat Noir, several of which were issued in Bokken Lasson's 1920 book 67 Viser fra det gamle Chat Noir.

From 1927 to 1931 Dybwad worked as a public defender at Oslo City Court and Aker District Court. He was also a prolific memoirist, both from his legal career—På anklagebenken. Små hverdagshistorier fra rettssalen (1933), Skyldig eller ikke skyldig (1934), Retten er satt (1937), Glade minner fra spredte år (1950)—and from his life in general: Mestertjuer og skøierjenter for hundre år siden (1935), Venner og kjenninger fra 80-årene (1941). In 1942 he wrote a biography on his father.
