= Schramme =

Schramm is a German surname derived from the a nickname Schram, Schramme ('scratch, scar, wound'). It may also be derived from the settlement named Schram, Schramm, Schrammen.

- Jean Schramme
- Jörg Schramme

== See also ==
- Schramm (disambiguation)
- Schram
