= Aschehoug =

Norwegian publishing house

- Founded: 1872
- Founder: Hieronymus and Halvard Aschehoug
- Country of origin: Norway
- Headquarters location: Oslo
- Publication types: Books
- Official website: aschehoug.no

H. Aschehoug & Co. (W. Nygaard), commonly known as Aschehoug, (pronounced [ˈɑ̂skəhæʉ]) is one of the largest independent publishing companies in Norway, founded in 1872. Headquartered in Oslo, the publishing house has 480 employees. The Aschehoug group also comprises other publishing houses which it owns partially or wholly. The name Aschehoug can be directly translated as "ash hill".

== History ==
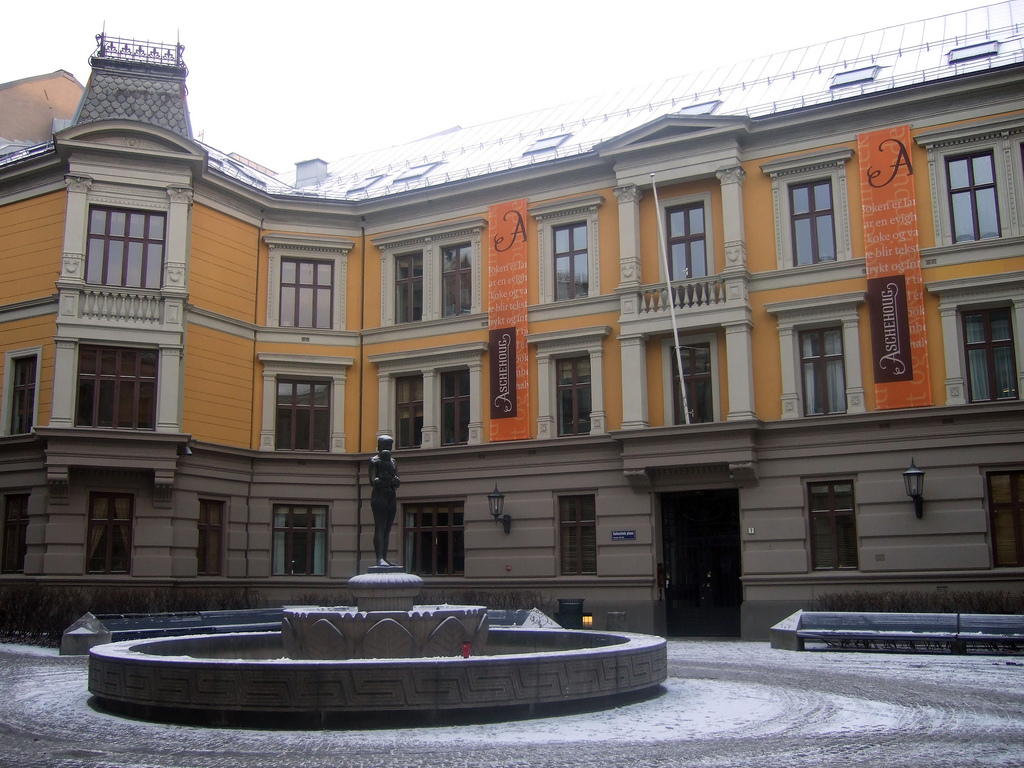
Aschehoug's main office at Sehesteds plass, Oslo.

Aschehoug was founded as a bookstore in 1872 on Egertorvet in Oslo by the cousins Hieronymus and Halvard Aschehoug. From the start the firm was involved in publishing in a modest way, its output consisting mainly of school books. In 1888, the company was taken over by William Martin Nygaard (1865–1952) and Thorstein Lambrechts (1856–1933), who kept the name while expanding its operations.

In 1900, William Nygaard withdrew from the bookselling side of the business and established a publishing company, which was given the name H. Aschehoug & Co. (W. Nygaard). In 1935, following the death of Nygaard, the publishing house turned into a corporation in connection with the inheritance settlement, and Nygaard's son, Mads Wiel Nygaard became the Executive Officer.

Aschehoug have published many important books over their years of operation. Important Norwegian authors first published by Aschehoug include the Nobel Prize laureate, Sigrid Undset, as well as Fridtjof Nansen, Johan Falkberget, Hans E. Kinck, Aksel Sandemose, Arne Garborg — all writers whose works are today regarded as classics of Norwegian literature.

== Operations ==
Aschehoug's publishing program is divided into three main categories: works of fiction, including books for children and younger readers; works of reference, popular science and handbooks on various hobbies; and Norway's leading publishing house for textbooks, for every level of instruction.

In 2004, Aschehoug Agency was founded to represent the foreign rights of Forlaget Oktober, Aschehoug and Universitetsforlaget publishing houses. Aschehoug has an interest in several other publishing companies, among them:

- Universitetsforlaget (100%) - the main academic press in Norway
- Forlaget Oktober (91%) - formerly the Marxist-Leninist press, now a publisher of fiction
- Norli Gruppen (100%) - bookstore chain
- Lydbokforlaget (33%) - audiobooks
- De norske Bokklubbene (48.5%) - book clubs
- Forlagsentralen (50%) - distributes more than 75% of all books in Norway
- Kunnskapsforlaget (50%) - publishes encyclopedias

Aschehoug also published Salman Rushdie's book Satanic Verses. The company's then CEO William Nygaard was shot and seriously wounded in 1993, presumably as a result of the fatwa issued against Rushdie and his publishers.

== Executive officers ==
- William Martin Nygaard (1900–1935)
- Mads Wiel Nygaard (1935–1952)
- Andreas Wiel Nygaard (1952–1955)
- Arthur Holmesland (1955–1973)
- William Nygaard (1974–2010)
- Mads Nygaard (2010–present)
