= Michal Šrom =

Czech footballer

Personal information
- Date of birth: 25 December 1987 (age 38)
- Place of birth: Czechoslovakia
- Height: 1.78 m (5 ft 10 in)
- Position: Midfielder

Team information
- Current team: FC Tescoma Zlín
- Number: 9

Senior career*
Years	Team	Apps	(Gls)
2009–	Zlín	48	(3)
- * Club domestic league appearances and goals as of 12 November 2011

Michal Šrom (born 25 December 1987) is a Czech football player who currently plays for FC Tescoma Zlín. He made his Gambrinus liga debut on 30 May 2009 in a 6–1 defeat away at Jablonec.
