= Gregers Gjersøe =

Danish explorer (born 1957)

- Born: 23 February 1957 (age 69); Søborg, Denmark
- Known for: First Dane to ski to the South Pole

Gregers Gjersøe (born 23 February 1957) is a Danish polar explorer, educator, author, lecturer, and former commercial pilot. He is best known for being one of the first two Danes to ski to the South Pole, alongside Kristian Joos.

== Biography ==
Gregers Gjersøe was born on 23 February 1957 in Søborg, Denmark. He worked for over 2 decades as a commercial pilot, first getting hist start in the industry with SAS Airlines in the mid-1980s. He also spent 1 year as a pilot stationed at Thule Airbase, in northern Greenland.

While working as a pilot in northern Norway in the mid-1990s, Gjersøe visited the Polarmuseet in the town of Tromsø. After visiting the museum, he became captivated by the tales of previous polar adventurers and committed himself to learning as much about these explorers as he could.

Soon enough, he began planning his first expedition to the polar regions - a trip to Svalbard in 1997. However, after just 20 hours, the expedition abruptly ended and Gjersøe returned home, having been unprepared for the conditions.

Two years later, Gjersøe and two of his friends - Kallen Kronholm and Kristain Joos, set off on the Danish X Greenland Expedition of 1999, a successful 45 day long ski crossing of Greenland. The team was inspired by Fritjof Nansen's book, Skiing Across Greenland, so they simulated the Nansen's historic adventure by crossing Greenland unsupported from Sdr. Strømford in the west to Isotorq in the east

In 2000–2001, Gjersøe and Joos completed a 56-day unsupported crossing of Antarctica from Hercules Inlet. They arrived at the South Pole on 13 January 2001, becoming the first two Danes to complete an unsupported ski expedition to the geographic southernmost point on Earth.

== Polar Education ==
In 2014, Gjersøe received funding from Denmark's Ministry of Education to write a book about Greenland, the Faroe Islands, and the Arctic for Danish schoolchildren. This work also led Gjersøe to start Polarskolen (English: The Polar School), an educational organization dedicated to teaching Danish children about Denmark's connection to the Arctic.

== Selected bibliography ==
- Gjersøe, Gregers. (2014) Danmark og Grønland i det nye Arktis. ISBN 9788799783106
- Joos, Kristian & Gjersøe, Gregers. (2001) På ski til Sydpolen: den første danske ekspedition. ISBN 8711115459
