= Christoffer Dybvad =

Danish mathematician

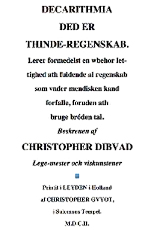
"Decarithmia. Ded er Thinde-Regnskab" (1602)

Christoffer Dybvad (1578–1622) was a Danish mathematician. He was born in Copenhagen, the son of Professor Jørgen Dybvad.

He adapted Simon Stevin's De Thiende into Danish.
