= Greger =

Greger is a surname. Notable people with the surname include:

- Christoph Greger (born 1997), German footballer
- Jonas Greger Walnum (1771–1838), Norwegian property owner and politician
- Debora Greger (born 1949), American poet and artist
- Luise Greger (1862–1944), German composer and pianist
- Max Greger (1926–2015), German Jazz musician, saxophonist, big band director and conductor
- Michael Greger (born 1972), American physician, author, and speaker on public health issues
- Piotr Greger (born 1964), Polish Roman Catholic bishop
- Rolf Greger Strøm (1940–1994) Norwegian luger

== See also ==
- Greger (given name)
- Gregers, another given name
