= Nordisk Defence Club =

Logo.

The Nordisk Defence Club (Norwegian: Nordisk Skibsrederforening) is the world’s largest independent FD&D club and legal services association for the shipowning community. Its members are leading shipowners and operators based in the Nordics and worldwide.

It was established in Copenhagen in 1889 and moved to Oslo in 1891. The invitation to Nordisk's founding meeting in Copenhagen said the purpose of the association would be “to work in the interest of the shipping industry”. A key reason for its establishment was to organize shipowners in a common effort to avoid unreasonable charterparty clauses imposed by charterers in the prevailing poor market. This included working to develop standardized charter parties. One of the documents Nordisk worked on was the Baltcon charterparty, which became the first document of BIMCO in 1908. Nordisk has ever since been involved in the drafting of a large number of BIMCO documents, including Baltime, NYPE, Norwegian Saleform, Barecon, Shipman and Supplytime.

Nordisk began issuing a collection of maritime court and arbitration decisions from the Nordic countries in 1900. Known as Nordiske domme i sjøfartsanliggender (ND), it is still edited and published regularly by Nordisk.

Nordisk's purpose is to act as a legal services provider for the clients who have registered ships and oil rigs with the club. Nordisk currently employs 24 lawyers, of which around half are from the Nordic countries and half English and American.

During its first 70 years it had only two chief executives; Johannes Jantzen from 1889 to 1935 and Niels Juell Dybwad from 1935 to 1960. Dybwad was succeeded by Per Gram. Gram served until 1978 when Ole Lund took over.

Chief executive from April 2021 is Mats Erik Sæther and the chairman of the board is Jan William Denstadg. Its organizational headquarters are at Kristinelundveien 22 in Oslo, and it also has an office in Singapore.
