= Harald Gram =

Norwegian politician (1887–1961)

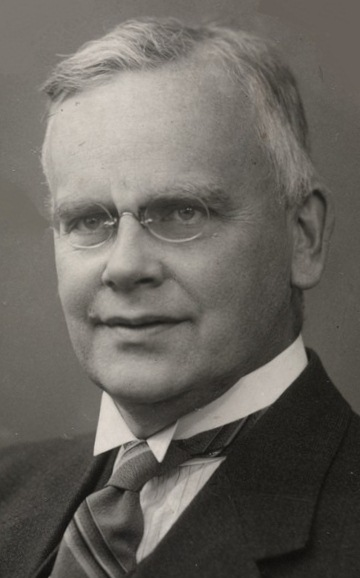
- Gram, c. 1930

Member of Parliament
- In office 1928–1936

Personal details
- Born: 18 September 1887 Kristiania
- Died: 7 June 1961 (aged 73) Oslo
- Party: Conservative
- Relations: Gregers Winther Wulfsberg Gram (father)
- Children: Gregers Gram
- Occupation: Stipendiary magistrate
- Profession: Jurist

Harald Gram (18 September 1887 – 7 June 1961) was a Norwegian jurist, politician and genealogist. He was secretary general for the Conservative Party of Norway for 22 years, deputy mayor of Aker, member of Parliament from 1928 to 1936, and stipendiary magistrate in Oslo from 1936 to 1957. He was also noted for his work during World War II.

== Personal life ==
Gram was born in Kristiania as the son of former Prime Minister Gregers Winther Wulfsberg Gram (1846–1929) and Antoinette Augusta Brodtkorb (1846–1929). Several of his ancestors on both the maternal and paternal side had been politicians, including Jens Jensen Gram, Gregers Winther Wulfsberg, Bernt Sverdrup Maschmann and Jens Aars. He was also a second cousin of Johan Fredrik and Mads Gram. Harald Gram was married to Ingrid Meyer (née Sønderaall, 1888–1969), fathering the well-known resistance fighter Gregers Gram.

== Career ==
After finishing his education as a jurist, taking the cand.jur. degree in 1911, Gram was engaged as secretary general of the Conservative Party of Norway in 1914, a position he held until 1936. His first post as an elected politician was as a member of Aker municipal council in 1919. From 1925 to 1928 he served as deputy mayor. He then entered national politics, being elected to the Norwegian Parliament in 1927, 1930 and 1933, representing Akershus. He was not-elected to Parliament in 1936, instead returning to Aker municipal council. He was also hired as the stipendiary magistrate in Oslo, serving from 1936 to 1957.

Gram was a resistance pioneer during World War II, organising protests against efforts from Vidkun Quisling's Nasjonal Samling to take control over professional organisations. In 1942 he was called to Stockholm to take over Anders Frihagen's duties at the Norwegian Legation there, leading an office responsible for financing the resistance work in Norway. This office, called Idrettskontoret ("The Sports Office"), was responsible for secret transfers of funds to the resistance movement, and the office also established a secret courier and communications service in Norway. The office was later reorganised, and appeared under the new name Sambandskontoret. In 1944, his son was killed by German agents. The acting stipendiary magistrate while Gram was in Sweden was the Nazi Wilhelm Frimann Koren Christie.

After the war, Gram continued in his office position in Oslo. He was also interested in genealogy, and served as editor-in-chief for the magazine Norsk slektshistorisk tidsskrift from 1947 to 1959, and was a board member of the Norwegian Genealogical Society from 1947 to 1957. He was also the editor of Norges Statskalender in 1947 and 1948, as well as co-publishing the yearbook Hvem er Hvem? ("Who's Who?").

Gram was decorated as a Knight of the Order of St. Olav in 1947 and as a Commander of the Danish Order of the Dannebrog.
