= Ole Lund =

Norwegian lawyer (1934–2026)

- Born: 8 July 1934; Hammerfest, Norway
- Died: 14 November 2026 (aged 92)
- Education: University of Oslo
- Occupations: Jurist; Industrial leader

Ole Lund (8 July 1934 – 14 November 2026) was a Norwegian barrister and industrial leader.

== Life and career ==
Ole Lund was born in Hammerfest, on 8 July 1934, to lawyer Ole Lund (1903–1981) and Hjørdis Stavseth.

He graduated as cand.jur. from the University of Oslo in 1959, and was barrister with access to work with the Supreme Court from 1969. From 1975 he was director of the shipping company Olsen & Ugelstad, and from 1978 to 1986 he was manager of the Nordisk Defence Club. From 1986 he was running his own practice as lawyer, and from 1998 to 2006 he was a partner in the law company BA-HR. He had at various times been chairman of the board of Oslo Stock Exchange, Bergen Bank, Den norske Bank and Statoil.

According to Gunnar Stavrum, Lund is regarded as the architect behind the formation of the offshore drilling company Transocean. He was also a central person when Schibsted was transformed from a private company into a modern media conglomerate. And he was central in the formation of Den norske Bank (DnB), as a merger between Bergen Bank and Den norske Creditbank, and later chaired the board of the bank. A chairman of the board of the state-owned petroleum company Statoil (later renamed Equinor), he was a driving force in the process of restructuring and privatization of the company.

Lund died on 14 November 2026, at the age of 92.
