= Jørgen Dybvad =

Danish theologian and mathematician (1545–1612)

Jørgen Dybvad (died 1612), was a Danish theologian and mathematician of the sixteenth and seventeenth century.

Jørgen was born to prosperous Yeoman stock in Dybvad in Gosmer Parish, Aarhus, and took the name of his place of birth.

Dybvad studied under Caspar Peucer and Sebastian Theodoricus at the University of Wittenberg. He later became a prominent scholar who wrote on astronomy, meteorology, and mathematics. He tended toward new, radically anti-Aristotelian ways of thinking. He was the first Dane to publish a commentary on Copernicus, and he had no trouble accepting the new star of 1572 as evidence of celestial mutability. However he was not a systematic astronomer. In astrology he merged the Ptolemaic approach with a contemporary tradition of historical chronology. He was also a Hebrew scholar.

== Appointment as professor ==
In 1575 Dybvad was sent by Augustus I of Saxony to Denmark with a letter for Frederick II of Denmark which concerned the Crypto-Calvinists who had recently been imprisoned in Saxony. They had pleaded that they were following a precedent set in Denmark. In particular, the Dane, Niels Hemmingsen had recently published Syntagma institutionum christianarum which offered a Calvinist interpretation of the Eucharist. King Frederick responded by organising a hearing in Copenhagen Castle on 15 June. Despite resolute interrogation by Jørgen Rosenkrantz, Hemmingsen was defended by Peder Oxe. However, after Oxe's death in October and a further recommendation from Augustus I, Dybvad was appointed professor of theology at the University of Copenhagen. However Frederick II secured a retraction from Hemmingsen and forbade further discussion of the Eucharist despite pressure from Augustus I. Nevertheless, Hemmingsen lobbied for Tycho Brahe to be appointed as Rector of the University in the hope that Brahe could curb Dybvad's influence. However Brahe declined.

== Augury at Sorø Abbey ==
At the Feast of St Martin, held in Sorø Abbey, on 11 November 1577, Dybvad was amongst the royal entourage gathered there around Frederick II. A comet was seen which led Dybvad to write En nyttig Vnderuissning Om den COMET, som dette Aar 1577. in Nouembrj først haffuer ladet sig see (Copenhagen: Laurentz Benedicht, 1578). This contained all sorts of apocalyptical prophecies, many of a political nature:

"Hungary may well fear highly of the Turk. Hispania will feel a hard rod. Cologne on the Rhine will not be left out. Saxony, Thuiringen, Hesse, Steiermark, the Brandenburg lands, Augsburg, Kostnitz, Cleve, Berg, Ghent, Mecklenburg, Lithuania, must make ready for the effects of this comet, and especially for pestilence. Poland dare not be proud, for it must also drink of the cup, and it appears in particular, that the Muscovite or the Tartar will bring a sour visitation upon them.... Denmark, uplift thine eyes, shake off the sleep ... look about thee, and mark, that this comet does also threaten thee with pestilence and dear times.... The Muscovite, Sweden, Walachia, Westphalia, Trent, Hamburg, Bremen, Salzburg, Calabria, Portugal, Alexandria, and many other realms and lands will also receive something of this comet's effects."

Tycho Brahe also observed the comet and wrote a report for Fredrick II. A German language text has been identified as being this report and includes a passage which may be taken as referring to Dybvad:

"Not alone they, but many others, who seek their own honor and gain in the guise of the true religion, and as pseudo-prophets, not born of the Divine light from heavens and stars, but set up in the vineyard unsummoned and on their own volition, will be punished and tamed by these pseudo-planets, for the comet has let itself be seen as a pseudo-planet so that the children of the planets, both clerical and secular, who have mounted too high in their arrogance, and have not wandered in divine wisdom, will be punished."

His son was Christoffer Dybvad.
