= Gregers Winther Wulfsberg =

Norwegian jurist and politician

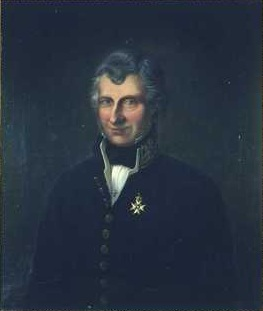
- Gregers Winther Wulfsberg portrayed by Mathilde Schmidt
- Born: 26 October 1780; Tønsberg, Norway
- Died: 23 September 1846 (aged 65)
- Occupations: Jurist; Politician
- Known for: Member of the Norwegian Constituent Assembly in 1814

Gregers Winther Wulfsberg (26 October 1780 – 23 September 1846) was a Norwegian jurist and politician, and a member of the Norwegian Constituent Assembly at Eidsvoll that wrote the Constitution of Norway on 17 May 1814.

== Personal life ==
Wulfsberg was born in Tønsberg as the son of merchant and district stipendiary magistrate Jacob Wulfsberg (1751–1826) and Inger Helvig Seeberg (1752–1797). He was a brother of priest and publisher Niels Wulfsberg. In 1811 he married Johanne Iverine Friborg. They were the grandparents of politician and Prime Minister Gregers Winther Wulfsberg Gram. He was also father-in-law of judge Christopher Hansteen.

== Career ==
Wulfsberg took a private examen artium in 1801, and later studied law at the University of Copenhagen, and finished his degree in 1804. He was stipendiary magistrate in the city Moss from 1811, and from 1822 also district stipendiary magistrate to the Moss district.

He was elected as a delegate from Moss to the Norwegian Constituent Assembly at Eidsvoll in 1814. His proposition that Government Ministers should be appointed by the Parliament received only a single vote (his own), while the assembly adopted his other proposition, that two brothers or father and son could not simultaneously be members of the Government. Wulfsberg was a member of the Parliament of Norway in 1824, 1827 and 1828, representing Moss. He was a County Governor of Smaalenenes Amt from 1831 to his death.

Wulfsberg was decorated Knight of the Order of the Polar Star in 1826. He died in September 1846 in Moss. His diaries from 1814 are printed in Yngvar Nielsen's Bidrag til Norges Historie i 1814, Volume I (1882).

Civic offices
Preceded by Valentin Christian Wilhelm Sibbern	County Governor of Smaalenene; 1831–1846	Succeeded by Christian Birch-Reichenwald
