= Jens Gram =

Norwegian industrialist (1840–1912)

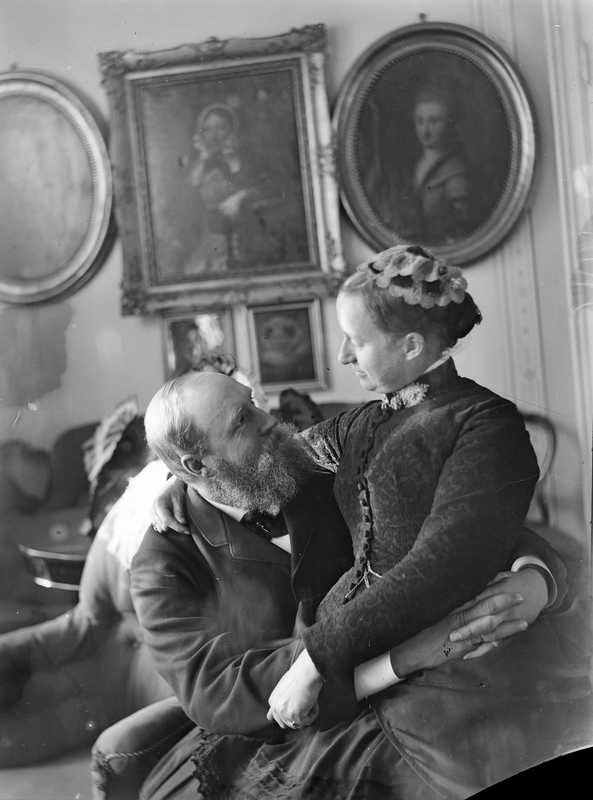
Jens and Julie in 1910

Jens Gram (15 November 1840 – 22 January 1912) was a Norwegian industrialist.

== Personal life ==
He was born in Ask as a son of Johan Georg Boll Gram and Fredrikke Severine Mathea Stabell. He was a brother of Andrea Gram, grandson of Jens Jensen Gram and a first cousin of Gregers Winther Wulfsberg Gram. Through his sister Nicoline he was a brother-in-law of Eilif Peterssen.

In July 1867 in Vadernes he married Julie Munch (1843–1928), daughter of P. A. Munch. They had two notable children, Johan Fredrik Gram and Mads Gram. Through Mads he was the father-in-law of art historian Irma Ingertha Gram.

== Career ==
He enrolled as a student in 1859, and also studied forestry in Germany for a couple of years. When returning home he worked as manager of the family-owned forests. In 1871 he moved to Drammen, where he was the vice consul for Denmark from 1870 to 1906. He took over the company Nils Bache and renamed it Bache & Gran. Thorleif Bache was a co-owner, but pulled out ten years later. The company became important in the city's pulp and paper industry, and Gram chaired Skandinavisk træmasseforening and Drammens trælasthandlerdirektion. In 1900 he co-founded Norwegian Employers' Confederation, a predecessor of the Confederation of Norwegian Enterprise.

He died in January 1912 in Skoger.
