= Jacob R. Schramm =

American botanist (1885–1976)

Jacob Richard Schramm (February 6, 1885 in Hancock County, Indiana – January 13, 1976 in Indianapolis, Indiana) was an American botanist. He was Professor of Botany (1937–1955) and director of the Morris Arboretum (1939–1954) at the University of Pennsylvania, and previously taught at Washington University in St. Louis and Cornell. Following his retirement from Pennsylvania he was appointed Research Scholar of Botany at Indiana University. He helped found the abstracting journal Botanical Abstracts, and served as editor-in-chief of it and of its successor, Biological Abstracts. He served as vice-president and president of the Botanical Society of America and as vice-president of the American Philosophical Society, of which he was a member and which awarded him its Franklin Medal in 1958.
