= Ask, Buskerud =

Village in Ringerike municipality, Norway

Coordinates: 60°8′7.26″N 10°10′4.87″E

Ask is a village in Ringerike municipality, Buskerud, Norway. Ash is located along Norwegian national road Rv35 approx. 6 km southwest of the municipality Hønefoss. The village once had a railway station on the Randsfjord Line. Ask is most known for Ask Chapel and for Ask gods, a Manor house owned by the Løvenskiold family.

== Ask gods ==
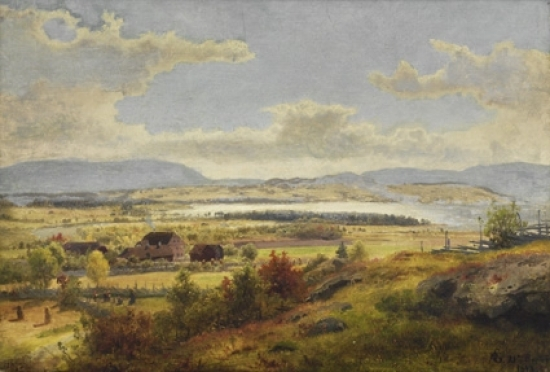
Ask Gods by Hans Fredrik Gude (1848)

Ask Farm (Gården Ask or Ask gods) is located at the northwest end of Tyrifjorden. The name comes from the Norwegian word for European ash. The farm, which is one of the oldest in Ringerike, gave name to the village of Ask. Odelsting President and District Jens Jensen Gram bought the farm at auction in 1816. The manor house was designed by the son of Jens Jensen Gram, Major General Johan Georg Boll Gram (1809–1873) and was completed in 1874 by his widow, Fredrikke Stabell Gram (1811-1896). Painter and writer Christian Skredsvig lived there a few months winter of 1878–79. Authors Peter Christian Asbjornsen and Jørgen Moe were also frequented guests. Local artist Harald Vibe (1877-1965) owned the estate for a short period, from 1919 to 1922. Axel Løvenskiold bought the estate in 1937, and it is still in family ownership. The estate still owns large forest areas and includes approx. 500 acres of farmland.

== Ask Chapel ==
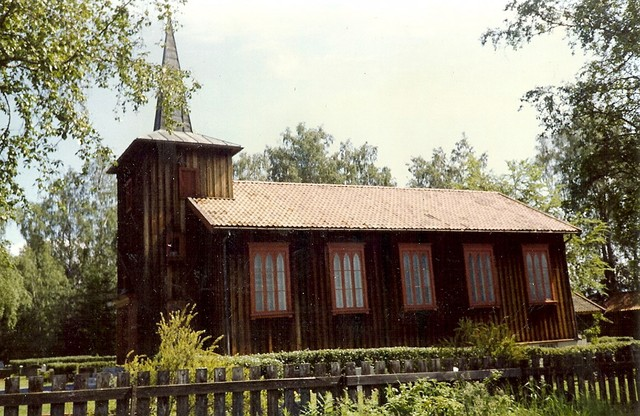
Ask Chapel

Ask chapel (Ask kapell) is a small church built in timber and located at the end of Sogna, on the north end of Tyrifjorden, along Rv35 towards Hokksund in Øvre Eiker. The land was ceded to the church with the right extensions. The construction began in 1936. The foundation stone of the church was closed June 1936. The church was completed for the inauguration on 26 February 1937.

The architect was W. L. Wilhelmsen. Woodcarving decorations in the chancel and altar were made by Norwegian artist, Ståle Kyllingstad (1903-1987). The interior of the church is covered with stained staff panel and sloping ceiling, with the exception of the middle section, which has a flat ceiling. The choir was altered in 1962. The chapel has an organ made by the J. H. Jørgensen organ company. The altar stands against the east wall of the chancel and altarpiece. It features a painting Jesus in Gethsemane.

== Other sources ==
- Kyllingstad, Røyne, Bjerke, Øivind Storm (2003) Ståle Kyllingstad (Labyrinth Press) ISBN 82-7393-137-4
