= Andrea Gram =

Norwegian artist (1853–1927)

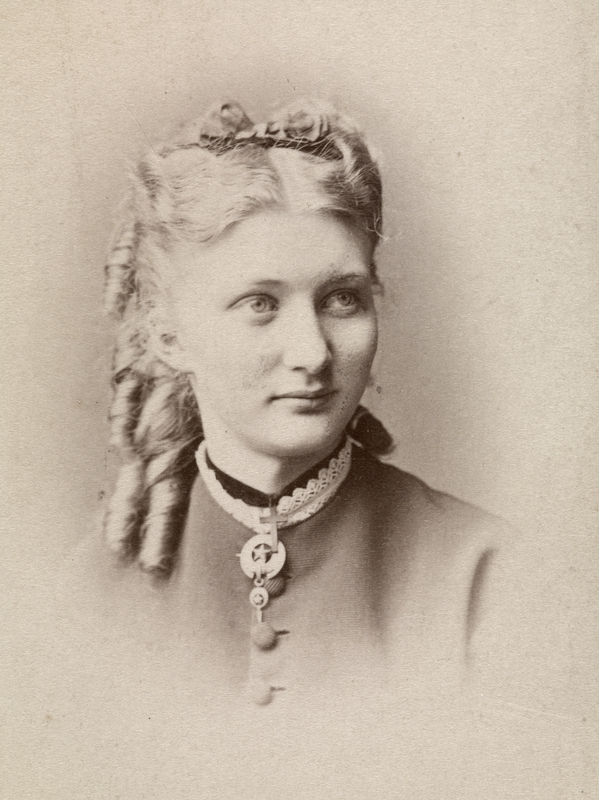
- Born: Grete Ingeborg Johanne Andrea Gram; 20 March 1853; Norderhov, Norway
- Died: 10 May 1927 (aged 74); Stockholm, Sweden
- Known for: Painting
- Spouse: Emil Kleen (m. 1881; died 1923)
- Relatives: Jens Gram (brother); Jens Jensen Gram (grandfather); Gregers Gram (cousin); Johan Fredrik Gram (nephew); Mads Gram (nephew)

Grete Ingeborg Johanne Andrea Gram (20 March 1853 – 10 May 1927) was a Norwegian painter. She is best known for her landscapes and portraits. Gram is also known for being a subject of an Eilif Peterssen portrait.

== Early life ==
Grete Ingeborg Johanne Andrea Gram was born on 20 March 1853 at the family estate Ask gods in the village of Ask at Norderhov parish in Buskerud. She was the daughter of Major General Johan Georg Boll Gram (1809–1873) and Frederikke Stabell. She was a sister of Jens Gram, granddaughter of Magistrate Jens Jensen Gram, first cousin of Gregers Gram and aunt of Johan Fredrik Gram and Mads Gram.

Gram and her sisters received private lessons in drawing, singing and reading from an early age. Their father took great pleasure in bringing them to observe their newly acquired skills.

== Career ==
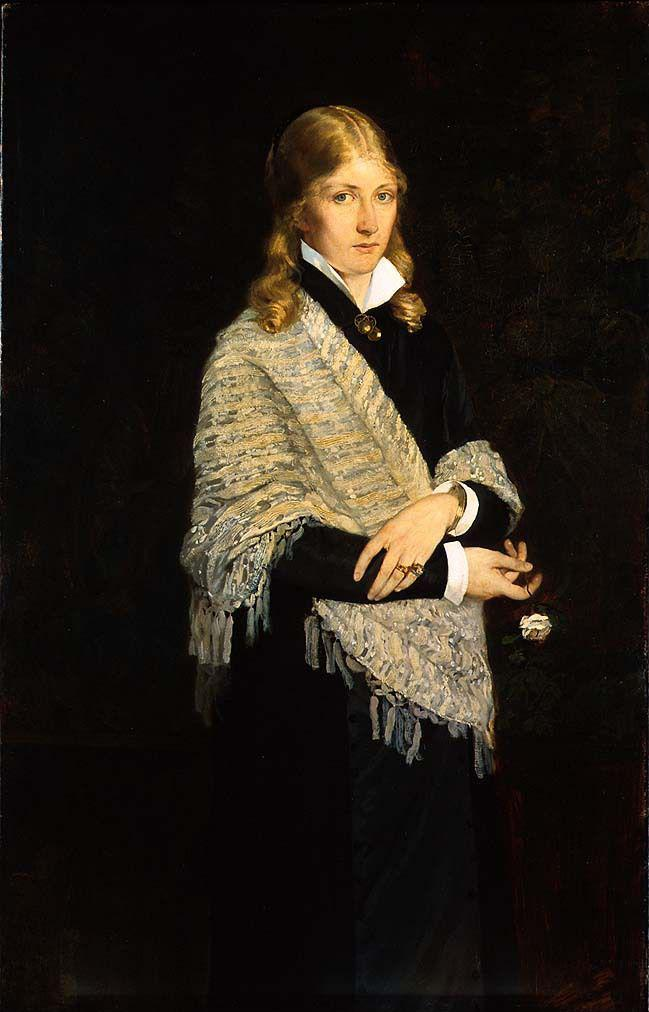
Portrait of Andrea Gram by Eilif Peterssen

Painter Hans Gude convinced Gram's father to allow her to have a formal art education. She was educated at Knud Bergslien's painting school in Christiania. Gram wanted to train to be a portrait painter, and painted her portraits in the late romantic style that she had learned at the school. During her time there, she was commissioned to paint the portraits of Kirsten and Nathalie Diriks. Afterwards, she travelled to Munich with her mother and two sisters, where she studied under Eilif Peterssen in the 1870s. Gram travelled with him to paint in Italy and painted Sulamith seeking Solomon there in 1880, which was exhibited at the Christiania Art Association. However the painting was later destroyed in a fire. Peterssen also travelled with her to Gram family's Ask estate. In 1879, Peterssen married Andrea Gram's sister Nicoline (1850–1882). Several other artists also stayed at the Ask estate, including Harriet Backer, another Peterssen student. Other Peterssen students at the time were Kitty Kielland and Asta Nørregaard.

== Personal life and death ==
She married Swedish physician Emil Kleen (1847–1923) on 26 May 1881 and moved to Stockholm, where her output slowed. Gram died there on 10 May 1927, at the age of 74.

== Gallery ==
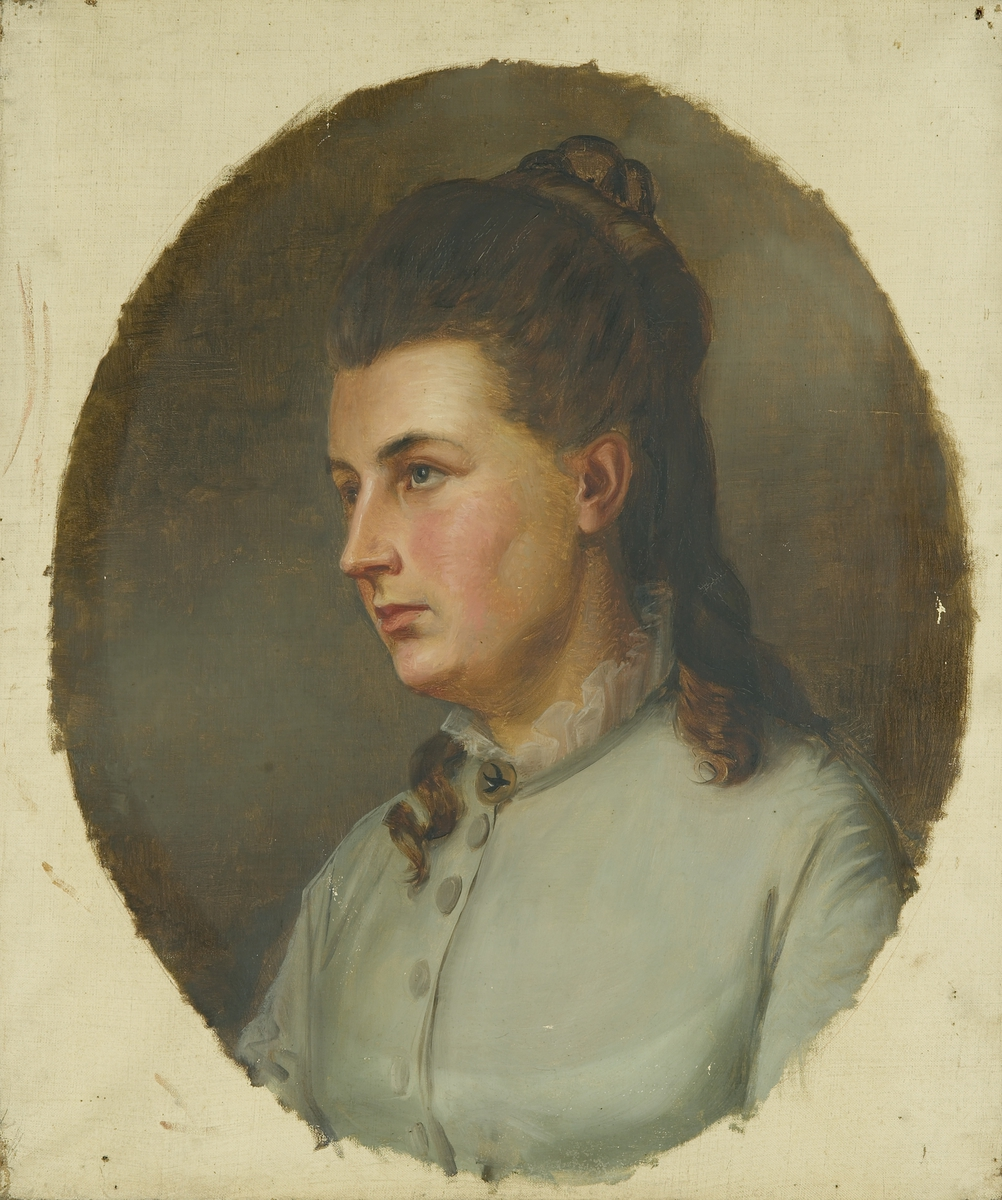
Portrait of Kirsten Diriks painted in 1873

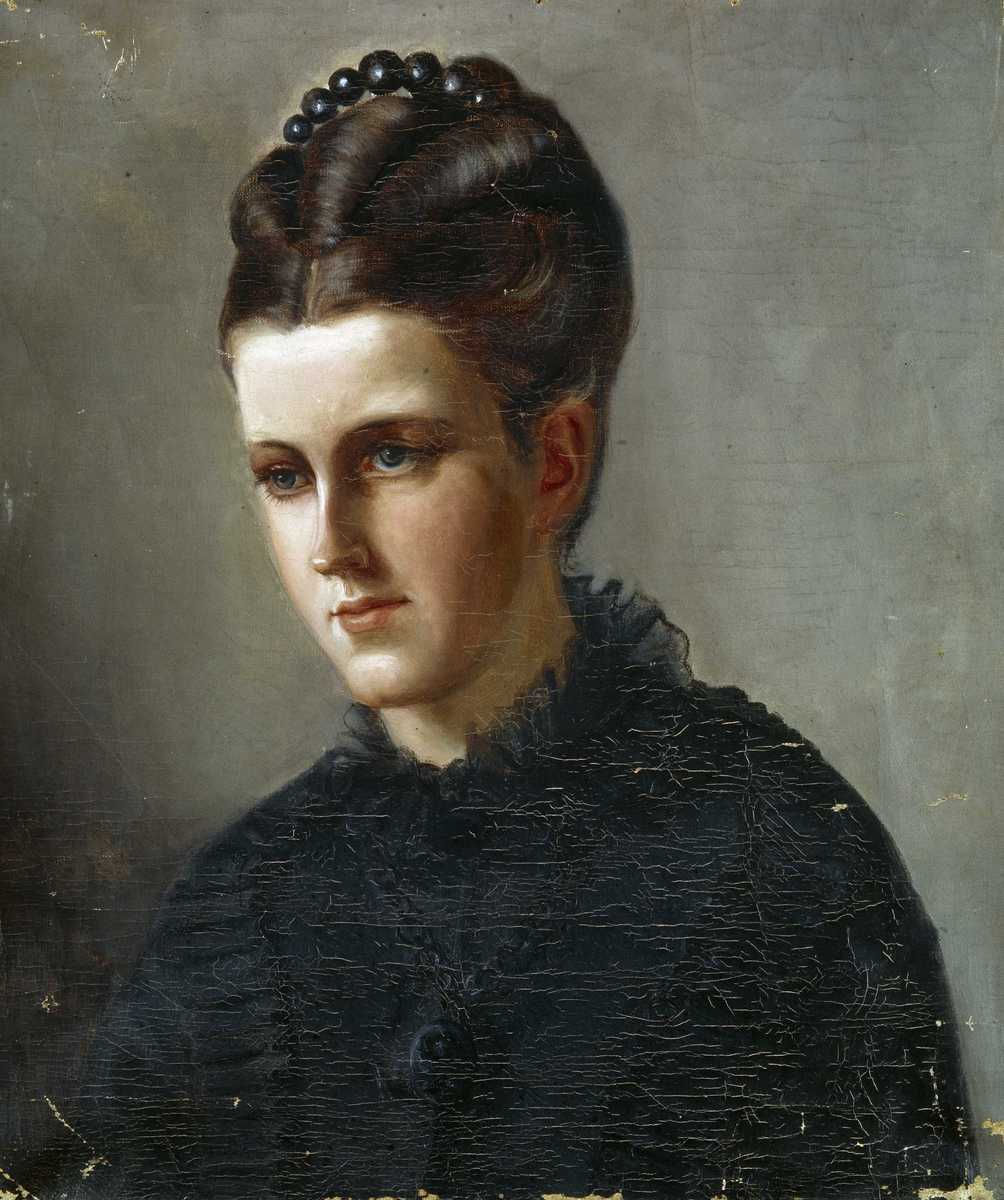
Portrait of Nathalie Diriks painted in 1874

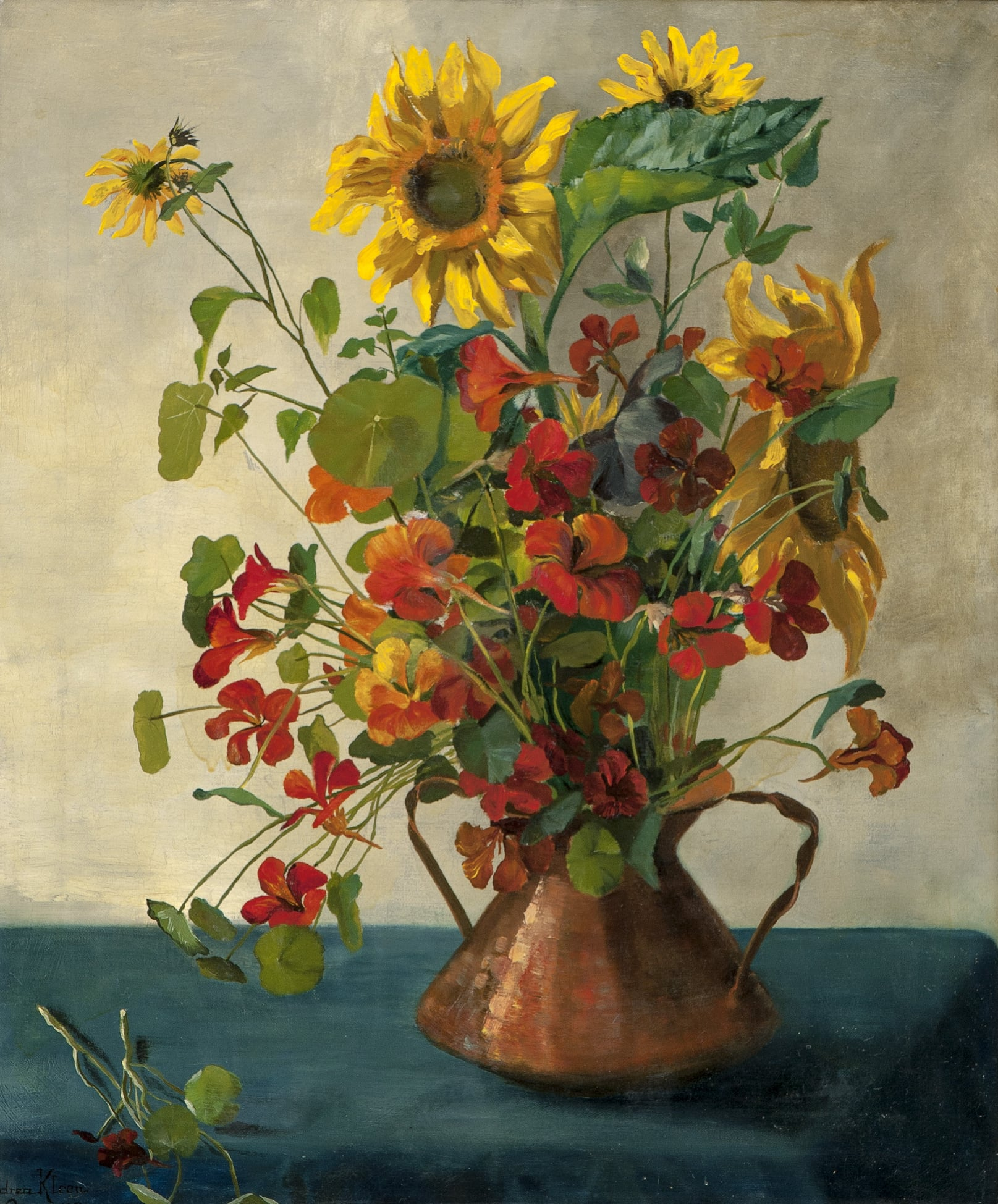
Sunflowers and Indian Cress in a Copper Vase painted in 1894
