= Constance Wiel Schram =

Norwegian writer and translator

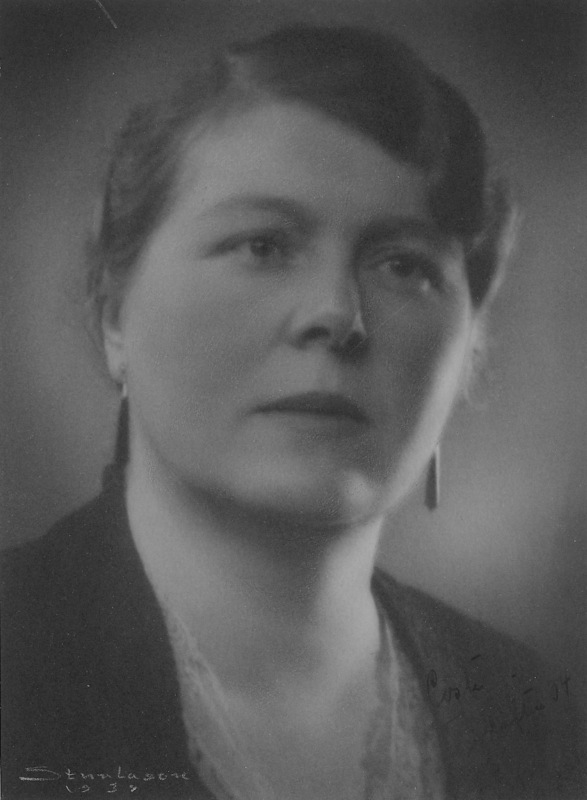
Constance Wiel Nygaard Schram, 1934

Constance Wiel Schram (née Nygaard; 27 September 1890, Christiania – 18 September 1955, Oslo) was a Norwegian writer and translator. She was the daughter of William Martin Nygaard (1865–1912) and Constance Wiel (1866–1931). Constance was the eldest of seven siblings; one of her brothers was the publisher, Mads Wiel Nygaard. She married Finn Thomas Andreas Schram on 26 Jul 1912, and they had a son, Andreas.

== Selected works ==
=== History and biographies ===
- Norske Kvinners Sanitetsforening. Tiden og menneskene som skapte den. Vekst og virke i femti år. 1896-1946 ("Norwegian Women's Public Health Association. The time and the people who created it. Growth and work in fifty years. 1896-1946"), Oslo 1946
- Florence Nightingale, Oslo 1938
- Keiserarven. Louis Napoleon Bonaparte, Oslo 1926
- Dronning Victoria. En Livsskildring, Kristiania 1922
- Otto v, Bismarck. En livsskidring, Kristiania 1916

=== Children's books ===
- Truls på Lofoten 1927
- Truls og Inger og dyrene deres. Fortalt for små barn, Oslo 1925

=== Translations into Norwegian ===
- Georg Soloveitsjik: Potemkin. Soldat, statsmann, elsker og Katarina den stores ektefelle, Oslo 1939
- Francis Hackett: Frans den første, Oslo 1935
- Duff Cooper: Talleyrand, Oslo 1933
- Arthur Weigall: Nero - Roms keiser, Oslo 1932
- Stephan Zweig: Joseph Fouché - portrett av et politisk menneske, Oslo 1930
- Jules Verne: En verdensomseiling under havet, Oslo 1930
- E. Phillips Oppenheim: Gullfuglen, Oslo 1929
- Georg Popoff: Dagligliv i Sovjetrusland, Kristiania, 1924.
