= Jens Jensen Gram =

Norwegian jurist and politician (1779–1824)

Jens Jensen Gram (12 February 1779 – 2 November 1824) was a Norwegian jurist and politician.

He was born in Copenhagen as the son of Jens Gram. He studied at the University of Copenhagen from 1798, and graduated with the cand.jur. degree in 1804. He worked in the Danish Chancellery from 1806 until 1808, when he was appointed as acting district stipendiary magistrate of Ringerike and Hallingdal. He got the position on a permanent basis in 1815. He lived in Nes from 1808, and at Ask from 1816. He was a deputy representative to Norwegian Constituent Assembly in 1814, and was elected to the Norwegian Parliament in 1818 and 1821, representing the constituency of Buskeruds Amt. He served as President of the Odelsting. Due to a stroke in late 1821, he was not re-elected in 1823.

In April 1806 in Norderhov he married Reinholdine Boll (1779–1859). Through his son Paul James Reinhold Harald Gram he was a grandfather of Gregers Winther Wulfsberg Gram and great-grandfather of Harald Gram. Through his son Johan Georg Boll Gram he was a grandfather of Andrea Gram and Jens Gram, and through the latter a grandfather of Johan Fredrik and Mads Gram, He died on 2 November 1824 in Christiania.
