= Gregers Gram (politician) =

Norwegian jurist and politician (1846–1929)

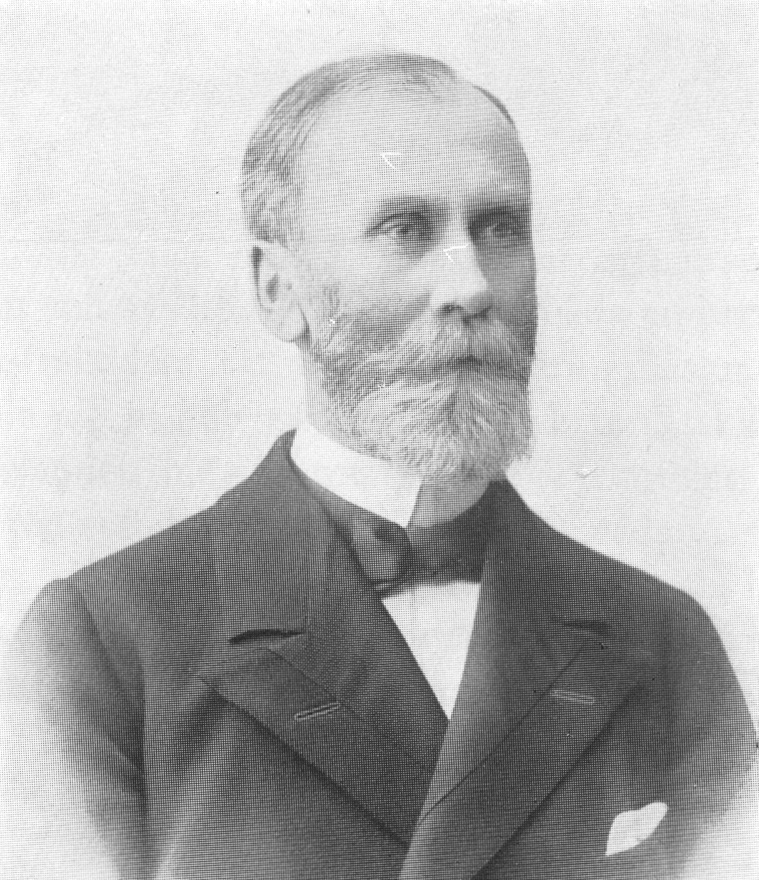

Norwegian Prime Minister in Stockholm
- In office 2 May 1893 – 17 February 1898
- Monarch: Oscar II
- Prime Minister: Emil Stang; Francis Hagerup
- Preceded by: Otto Blehr
- Succeeded by: Otto Blehr
- In office 13 July 1889 – 6 March 1891
- Monarch: Oscar II
- Prime Minister: Emil Stang
- Preceded by: Jacob Stang
- Succeeded by: Otto Blehr

County Governor of Hedmark
- In office 1898–1915
- Prime Minister: Johannes Steen; Otto Blehr; Francis Hagerup; Christian Michelsen; Jørgen Løvland; Gunnar Knudsen; Wollert Konow; Jens Bratlie
- Preceded by: Oscar Mørch
- Succeeded by: Johannes Irgens (Acting)

Personal details
- Born: Gregers Winther Wulfsberg Gram; 10 December 1846 Moss, Østfold, Sweden-Norway
- Died: 1 August 1929 (aged 82) Vestre Aker, Oslo, Norway
- Party: Conservative
- Relatives: Harald Gram (son); Johan Wollebæk (son-in-law); Gregers Gram (grandson)
- Profession: Jurist

Gregers Winther Wulfsberg Gram (10 December 1846 – 1 August 1929) was a Norwegian jurist and politician, and international arbitrator. He was a Supreme Court Assessor, Norwegian prime minister in Stockholm from 1889 to 1891 and from 1893 to 1898 and County Governor from 1898 to 1915.

== Personal life ==
Gram was born in Moss as the son of district stipendiary magistrate Paul James Reinhold Harald Gram (1818–1900) and Jensine Sophie Wulfsberg (1810–1902). He was a grandson of Jens Jensen Gram and Gregers Winther Wulfsberg, and a first cousin of Jens Gram.

In August 1878 he married Antoinette Augusta Brodtkorb (1857–1938). He was the father of politician Harald Gram (1887–1961) and through him the grandfather of resistance fighter Gregers Winther Wulfsberg Gram (1917–1944). His daughter Ida Fredrikke married diplomatist Johan Wollebæk.

== Career ==
Gram took his examen artium in 1864, and the cand.jur. degree in 1869. He worked in France and in the Norwegian Ministry of Justice, but then left Norway for some years. He worked as a jurist in Egypt, in Ismailia from 1875 to 1882, and later in Alexandria. Back in Norway he was a Supreme Court Assessor from 1884.

Gram belonged to the Conservative Party. When the first cabinet Stang assumed office in 1889, Gram was appointed Norwegian Prime Minister in Stockholm by Prime Minister Emil Stang. He served this position until the resignation of Stang's government in 1891. He was again Prime Minister in Stockholm during Stang's government from 1893. By 1895 this government had become weak due to internal conflicts. Gram was the architect of a new cabinet with Francis Hagerup as prime minister. This lasted from 1895 to 1898, but was unseated following the 1898 general election. During his last two tenures as Prime Minister in Stockholm, Gram had taken a moderate stance towards the union between Sweden and Norway, which many wanted to abolish. When a referendum was held on the dissolution of the union in 1905, Gram is believed to have voted against it, though this view was outnumbered 368,392 to 184.

After ending his political career he was County Governor of Hedmark from 1898 to 1915. He had declined several offers of ambassador positions during his career. Gram also served as a member of the arbitration tribunal in several international conflicts. He was a member of the Institut de Droit International from 1904, a board member from 1906 to 1910 and an honorary member from 1925. For his arbitration work he received the Grand Cross of the Royal Norwegian Order of St. Olav in 1893. He died in August 1929 in Vestre Aker, and is buried at Vestre gravlund.

Political offices
Preceded by Jacob Stang	Norwegian Prime Minister in Stockholm; 1889–1891	Succeeded by Otto Blehr
Preceded by Otto Blehr	Norwegian Prime Minister in Stockholm; 1893–1898	Succeeded by Otto Blehr
Civic offices
Preceded by Oscar Mørch	County Governor of Hedmark; 1898–1915	Succeeded by Johannes Irgens (acting)
