= Gregers Gram =

Norwegian resistance fighter and saboteur

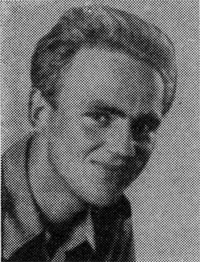
- Born: Gregers Winther Wulfsberg Gram; 15 December 1917; Vestre Aker, Oslo, Norway
- Died: 13 November 1944 (aged 26); Plasskafeen, Oslo, Norway
- Relatives: Gregers Gram, Sr. (grandfather); Harald Gram (father)
- Military career
- Allegiance: Norway
- Branch: Norwegian Army
- Service years: 1940–1944
- Rank: Second Lieutenant
- Unit: Special Operations Executive: Norwegian Independent Company 1
- Awards: War Cross with sword Military Cross; Military Medal

Gregers Winther Wulfsberg Gram MC MM (15 December 1917 – 13 November 1944) was a Norwegian resistance fighter and saboteur. A corporal and later second lieutenant in the Norwegian Independent Company 1 (Norwegian: Kompani Linge) during the Second World War, he was killed in 1944.

== Early life ==
Gregers Gram was born in Vestre Aker in 1917 as the son of Harald Gram, later known as stipendiary magistrate of Oslo. He was named after his paternal grandfather Gregers Winther Wulfsberg Gram, who served as Norwegian Prime Minister in Stockholm and County Governor of Hedmark.

Gram did not pass his examen artium at the first try, but later enrolled at the University of Oslo to study law.

== Second World War ==
When German troops invaded Norway on 9 April 1940, Gregers Gram became active in the resistance movement. After serving as a soldier in the early battles following the German invasion, he soon became involved in propaganda activity and the illegal press, he had to flee from Norway in 1941.

After arriving in Great Britain, he was recruited by the Special Operations Executive and received military training with Norwegian Independent Company 1.

He was paradropped into Norway together with Max Manus on 12 March 1943, and the two carried out a successful sabotage mission, Operation Mardonius, which resulted in the sinking of two ships and damage to a third on 28 April, despite the fact it was a very light night, and water conditions were such that the canoes generated a very visible phosphorescence in their wake. Gram and Manus returned to the United Kingdom, where they stayed until October 1943. Gram was awarded the British Military Medal as a result of his participation in the operation, the recommendation for the award describes how Manus became ill with pneumonia shortly after they arrived in Norway, meaning that Gram had to undertake much of the organisation on the ground, and also nursing Manus during his recovery. Gram was also decorated with Norway's War Cross with sword in summer 1943, presented to him by King Haakon at a ceremony at the training school STS 26 in Scotland, near Nethy Bridge. In addition to Gram, Manus, and Rønneberg and Poulsson from the Rjukan missions, also received the War Cross with sword at this ceremony. Present were Crown Prince Olav, Minister of Defence Oscar Torp, and Chief of Defence of Norway General von Tangen Hansteen.

In October 1943, Gram (along with Manus, Einar Juvén and C.F. Wiborg) returned to Norway to perform a second operation, known as Bundle, targeting German ships. Other sabotage missions followed, coordinated within Oslogjengen, Milorg's sabotage group in Oslo led by Gunnar Sønsteby. Parallel to his saboteur activity, Gram continued his involvement with propaganda, including the black propaganda Operation Derby directed towards German soldiers. In particular he was involved in an attack organised by Sønsteby which destroyed German records about the Norwegian workforce, and his attack on an oil storage depot.

Gram was killed on 13 November 1944 in an ambush in the PlassKafeen café in Grünerløkka in Oslo. Together with fellow resistance member Edvard Tallaksen, Gram went to a meeting with fake Nazi deserters. Shooting ensued, and Gram was killed at the hands of Gestapo. His father Harald Gram, who was also involved in the resistance movement, survived the war.

== Legacy ==
At the time of his death, the process of recommending Gram for the British Military Cross was already under way (this medal was not generally awarded posthumously at the time). The recommendation particularly mentions the successful sinking of a German patrol vessel in Oslo harbour in February 1944, and the daring, but unsuccessful, daylight attack on the troopship Monte Rosa. His Military Medal was presented to his father on 7 February 1945 by Sir Victor Mallet, who was then head of the British Legation in Stockholm.

To commemorate Gram a bust was erected near Njårdhallen, in the Ullern borough of Oslo, in 1994. The road Gregers Grams vei in Oslo has been named after him.

In 2008 he was portrayed in the Norwegian film Max Manus by actor Nicolai Cleve Broch.
