= Hannemor Gram =

Norwegian alpine skier (1918–2011)

Johanne "Hannemor" Gram (née Dybwad; 22 October 1918 – 27 January 2011) was a Norwegian alpine skier who competed in the 1936 Winter Olympics.

Born in Oslo, she was the daughter of Nils Juell Dybwad (1892–1972), a barrister, and his wife Stella Boye Semb. Hannemor Gram was a granddaughter of the renowned actress Johanne Dybwad; her given name was discarded in favor of the pet name "Hannemor" in order for other people to distinguish her from her grandmother. In 1939, she married the barrister Per Gram, and they had four children together, among them the politician Kari Garmann.

In 1936 she finished seventh in the alpine skiing combined event, representing the club IL Heming.
