= Mads Gram =

Norwegian physician (1875–1929)

Harald Mathias "Mads" Gram (6 February 1875 – 1929) was a Norwegian physician.

== Personal life ==
He was born in Drammen as the son of Jens Gram. He was a brother of Johan Fredrik Gram, a maternal grandson of P. A. Munch and a paternal great-grandson of Jens Jensen Gram, a nephew of Andrea Gram and a first cousin of Harald Gram. His aunt Nicoline was married to Eilif Peterssen.

In September 1907 he married Irma Ingertha Schram, a well-known art historian. She was the younger sister of his brother Johan's wife Elisabeth. Mads and Irma's son Peder "Per" Gram, who became a barrister, married alpine skier Johanne "Hannemor" Dybwad; they had the daughter Kari Garmann.

== Career ==
He finished his secondary education in 1892, and graduated with the cand.med. degree in 1900. In 1902 and 1903 he studied bacteriology at the University of Giessen and the Pasteur Institute. He worked in Kristiania from 1903. From July 1915 he was a lecturer at the University of Kristiania, and in December 1918 he was appointed as director of the Norwegian Directorate for Medicine. He succeeded Michael Holmboe. He travelled extensively abroad during this period, cooperating with foreign and international bodies. In August 1927 he was hired as the city physician (stadsfysikus) of Kristiania. He died in 1929.

Civic offices
Preceded by Michael Holmboe	Director of the Norwegian Directorate for Medicine; 1919–1926	Succeeded by vacant
