= Johanne Dybwad =

Norwegian stage actress and stage producer (1867–1950)

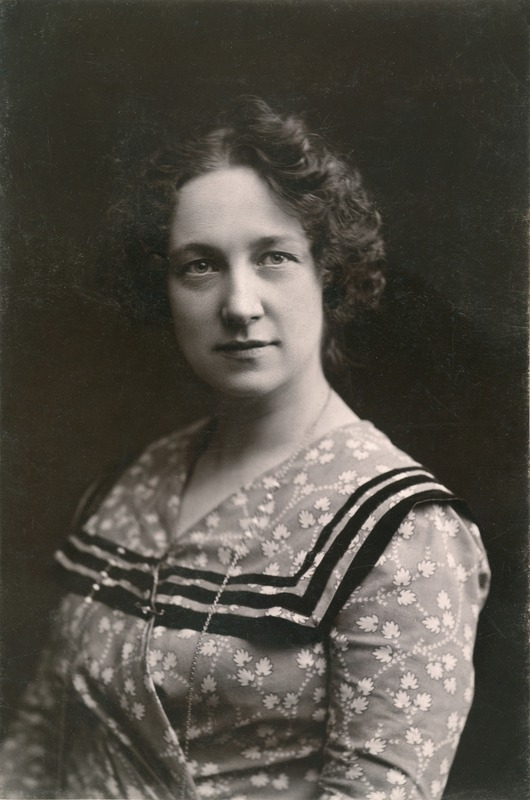
- Johanne Dybwad (c. 1900)
- Born: Johanne Juell; 2 August 1867; Christiania, Norway
- Died: 4 March 1950 (aged 82); Oslo, Norway
- Occupation: actress
- Spouse: Vilhelm Dybwad (m. 1891; div. 1916)
- Children: Nils Juell Dybwad
- Relatives: Hannemor Gram (granddaughter)

Johanne Dybwad (née Juell; 2 August 1867 – 4 March 1950) was a Norwegian stage actress and stage producer. She was the leading actress in Norwegian theatre for half a century.

== Early and personal life ==
Johanne was born in Christiania (now Oslo) as the daughter of actor Mathias Juell (1835–1894) and actress Johanne Regine Elvig (1847–1882). Both her parents were acting for the Christiania Theatre. Her mother was the first Norwegian to play "Nora" in Ibsen's A Doll's House, in 1880. Her mother died in 1882, only 34 years old, and Johanne grew up with her aunt in Bergen. Her foster parents wanted to keep her away from the theatre, but she wanted to become an actress.

== Career ==
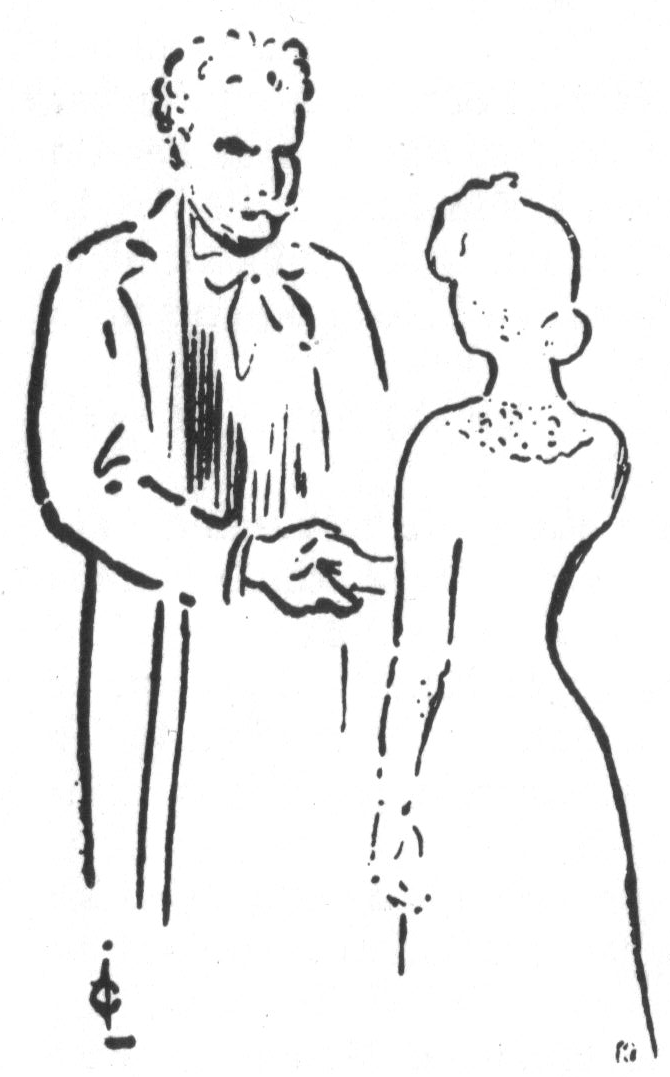
Johanne Dybwad as Cornelia, with Egil Eide, in Gunnar Heiberg's Kjærlighet til næsten (1903). Drawn by Gustav Lærum.

=== Actress ===
Johanne made her debut at Den Nationale Scene in Bergen 7 November 1887, in the comedy play Gertrude eller den lille skat. Her next role was "Nora" in A Doll's House. She had her breakthrough as "Fanchon" in Birch-Pfeiffer's play En liden Hex, first in Bergen, and later at Christiania Theatre in 1888. The scene when she danced in the moonshine, with her own shadow, fascinated the public, and theatre director and critic Gunnar Heiberg described the scene as "a big artist was born". She continued to play at Christiania Theatre, from 1888 to 1899. She joined theatre director Bjørn Bjørnson at the Nationaltheatret from its opening in 1899, and played here most of her career.

During her time at Christiania Theatre she played 76 roles, including "Hedvig" in The Wild Duck (1889), "Nora" in A Doll's House (1890), and "Juliet" in Romeo and Juliet (1899). At Nationaltheatret she played roles such as "Klara Sang" in Over Ævne I (1899), "Maja" in When We Dead Awaken and "Gerd" in Brand. She also toured with the theatre, to Copenhagen in 1903, to Berlin in 1907, and to Paris in 1937.

=== Stage producer ===
In 1906 she produced her first play, Maeterlinck's Pelléas and Mélisande. She would later produce more than forty plays, often playing the leading role herself. Among her productions were Euripides' classical tragedy Medea (1918), Nordahl Grieg's Barabbas (1927), and Schiller's Mary Stuart (1929).

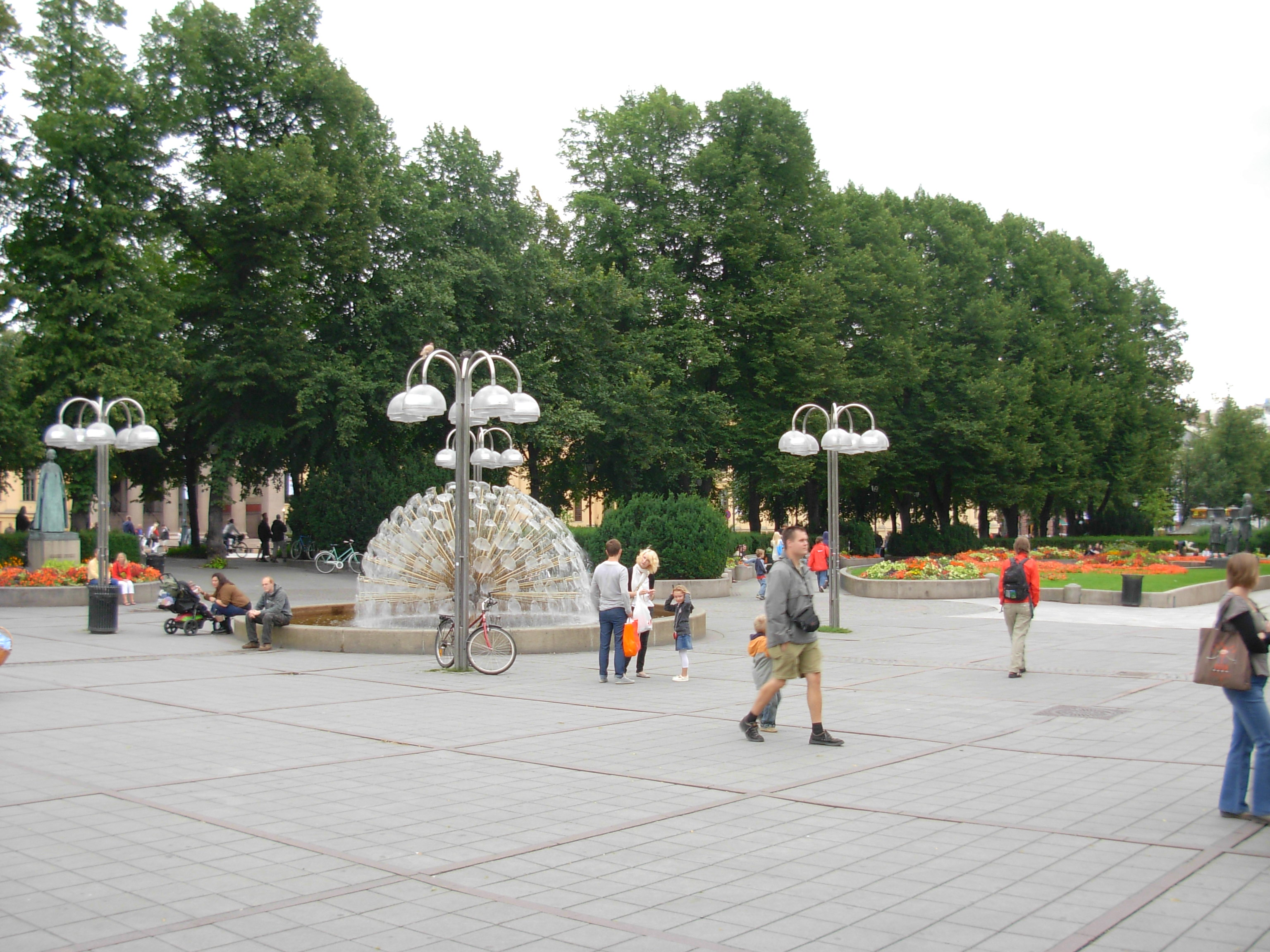
Johanne Dybwads plass

=== Honours ===
Johanne Dybwad was awarded the King's Medal of Merit (Kongens fortjenstmedalje) in gold. She was awarded Knight of the Royal Norwegian Order of St. Olav in 1924. At her 60 years' anniversary as actress, 7 November 1947, she played "Mor Aase" in Ibsen's Peer Gynt, and she was honoured with the Grand Cross of St. Olav. Her last stage appearance was one month later, 8 December 1947. She died 4 March 1950 in Oslo, 82 years old. She was buried Vår Frelsers gravlund in Oslo.

In 1962 a bronze statue of her was revealed at the front of the National Theatre in Oslo, sculptured by Per Ung. In 1967, she was the first Norwegian actor to be depicted on a postage stamp. The area in front of the National Theatre, Johanne Dybwads plass, is named after her, and the theatre's address is "Johanne Dybwads plass 1".

== Personal life ==
She was married to barrister and songwriter Vilhelm Dybwad (1863–1950) from 1891 to 1916. She was the mother of lawyer Nils Juell Dybwad (1892–1972).
