= Johan Fredrik Gram =

Norwegian chemist (1868–1947)

Johan Fredrik Gram (14 April 1868 – 27 December 1947) was a Norwegian chemist.

== Personal life ==
He was born in Drammen as a son of Jens Gram. He was a brother of Mads Gram, a maternal grandson of P. A. Munch and a paternal great-grandson of Jens Jensen Gram, a nephew of Andrea Gram and a second cousin of Harald Gram. His aunt Nicoline was married to Eilif Peterssen.

In October 1896 he married Elisabeth Cappe Schram. She was the older sister of his brother Mads' wife Irma.

== Career ==
He finished his secondary education in 1887, studied in Kristiania and Berlin, and took the dr.philos. degree in 1892 at the University of Jena. Between 1898 and 1903 he lived in Fredrikstad and was a co-owner of "Fredriksstad Trækulfabrik", an enterprise trying to produce charcoal from debris from the sawmills. The factory was torn down in 1903 and Gram and his family moved to Oslo. He was hired as the head chemist of the Norwegian State Railways in December 1908. He is also known for his research on the coal at Svalbard, harvested by Store Norske Spitsbergen Kulkompani from 1916.

Gram was also admitted into the exclusive skiing-based social club SK Ull in 1895. He served as deputy chairman from 1926 to 1928, and chairman from 1928 to 1933 and 1935 to 1940.
