= Nygaard (surname) =

Nygaard (also spelled Nygård, Nygårds or Nygard) is a surname of Scandinavian origin, derived from the compound of Old Norse words ny 'new' and garðr (modern gård or gaard 'farm', 'yard', or 'enclosure'. The name originated as a toponymic or habitational surname referring to someone who lived on or near a newly established farmstead.

== Etymology and variants ==
The components ny and gård together denote 'new farm' or 'new homestead'. This compound is found across Scandinavian languages; Danish, Norwegian and Swedish as Nygaard (often anglicized) or Nygård (retaining the letter å), and occasionally simplified as Nygard in English-speaking contexts. The variant forms also appear in genealogical databases as Nyegard, Nigaard, and others.

== People with the surname ==
- Agnes Nygaard Haug (born 1933), Norwegian judge
- Alfons Nygaard (born 2002), Swedish footballer
- Andreas Nygaard (1878–1963), Norwegian politician
- Anne-Pia Nygård (born 1977), Norwegian writer
- Arne Nygaard (born 1957), Norwegian organizational theorist
- Arne Nygård-Nilssen (1899–1958), Norwegian art historian, publicist, and magazine editor
- Åse Nygård Pedersen (fl. 1978–1984), Norwegian handball player
- Austin Nygaard (Born 1993), Canadian Fisherman
- Bob Nygaard (fl. from 2008), American private investigator
- Camilla Martin Nygaard (born 1974), Danish badminton player
- Christoffer Nygaard (born 1986), Danish auto racing driver
- Damien Nygaard (born 1945), Australian football player
- Eldon Nygaard (born 1946), American politician
- Eline Nygaard Riisnæs (1913–2011), Norwegian pianist and musicologist
- Erik Nygårds (born 1965), Swedish politician
- Finn Nygaard (born 1955), graphic designer from Denmark
- Gulborg Nygaard (1902–1991), Norwegian politician
- Gunhild Nygaard (born 1965), Norwegian fashion designer
- Gunnar Nygaard (disambiguation)
- Herluf Nygaard (1916–2001), Norwegian military officer
- Hermund Nygård (born 1979), Norwegian jazz musician
- Hjalmar Nygaard (disambiguation)
- Rain (gamer) (Håvard Nygaard, born 1994), Norwegian Counter-Strike player
- Jeff Nygaard (born 1972), American beach volleyball player
- Jens Nygaard (1931–2001), American orchestra conductor
- Jens Nygård (born 1978), Finnish footballer
- Jens Nygård (sport shooter) (1934–2005), Norwegian sports shooter
- Joakim Nygård (born 1993), Swedish ice hockey forward
- Jon Nygaard (born 1946), Norwegian Ibsen scholar
- Jon-Ivar Nygård (born 1973), Norwegian politician
- Jorun Askersrud Nygaard (1929–2012, Norwegian cross country skier and athlete
- Karl Emil Nygard (1906–1984), American communist politician
- Kristen Nygaard (1926–2002), Norwegian computer programmer and politician
- Kristen Nygaard (footballer) (born 1949), Danish footballer
- Marc Nygaard (born 1976), Danish footballer
- Margaret Nygard (1925–1995), British-American environmentalist and conservationist
- Marius Nygaard (disambiguation)
- Mathias Nygård, or Warlord Nygård, vocalist of Finnish folk metal band Turisas
- Nils Nygaard (1932–2015), Norwegian law professor
- Oddvar Nygaard (1919–1985), Norwegian accordionist and composer
- Olaf Nygaard (1894–1978), Norwegian cyclist
- Olav Nygard (1884–1924), Norwegian poet
- Olivia Lykke Nygaard (born 2001), Norwegian handball player
- Per Nygårds (born 1965), retired Swedish ice hockey player
- Peter Nygård (born 1941), Finnish-Canadian fashion executive
- Petri Nygård (born 1974), Finnish rap artist
- Ragnhild Nygaard (born 1944), Norwegian actress
- Rainer Nygård, Finnish guitar player of Diablo
- Rikke Nygard (born 2000), Norwegian footballer
- Roger Nygard (born 1962), American film director and producer
- Richard Lowell Nygaard (born 1940), American judge
- Safiya Nygaard (born 1992), American YouTuber
- Trygve Nygaard (born 1975), Norwegian footballer
- Vanessa Nygaard (born 1975), American basketball player and coach
- William Nygaard (born 1943), Norwegian publisher, head of Aschehoug
- William Martin Nygaard (1865–1952), Norwegian publisher and politician, head of Aschehoug

== Fictional characters ==
- Lester Nygaard, in TV series Fargo

== See also ==
- Johan Nygaardsvold, Norwegian politician
