= Charlotte Haug =

Norwegian physician and editor

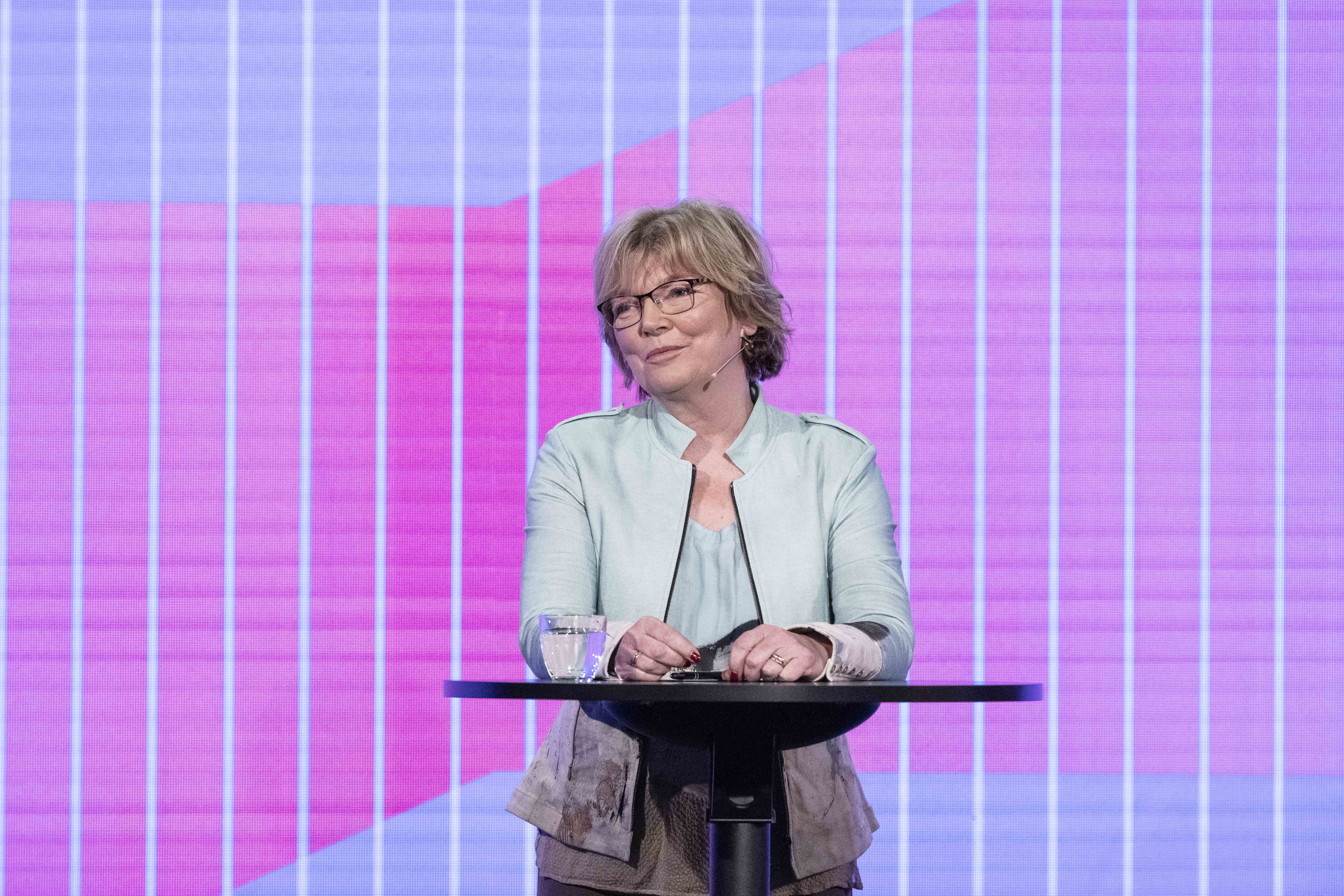
- Born: 21 May 1959 (age 66)
- Occupations: physician, editor
- Spouse: Gudmund Hernes
- Parents: Bjørn Haug; Agnes Nygaard Haug
- Relatives: Marius Nygaard (grandfather); Marius Nygaard Haug (brother)

Charlotte Haug (born 21 May 1959) is a Norwegian physician and editor, former editor of the Journal of the Norwegian Medical Association.

Haug graduated as dr.med. in infection immunology from the University of Oslo in 1999, and eventually as Master of Science in health research from Stanford University. She edited the Journal of the Norwegian Medical Association from 2002 to 2015.
