= Nygård =

Nygård, Nygard, Nygårds or Nygaard may refer to:

== Places ==
- Nygård, Norway, in Bergen, Vestland county
  - Nygård Bridge
  - Nygård Church
- Nygård, a farm area in Nygårdsjøen, Gildeskål, Nordland county, Norway
- Nygård, Sweden, in Lilla Edet Municipality, Västra Götaland County
- Nygårds hagar, or Nygård, in Nykvarn Municipality, Stockholm County, Sweden
- Nygard Park, now Prairie Sentinels Park, in Deloraine, Manitoba, Canada

== People with the surname ==
- Nygaard (surname) or Nygård, Nygard or Nygårds, including a list of people with the name

== Other uses ==
- Nygård International, a clothing design and manufacturing company
- SS Nygaard, a ship, later SS Belle of Spain

== See also ==
- Aschehoug, formally H. Aschehoug & Co. (W. Nygaard), a Norwegian publishing company
