= Laug =

Laug is a surname. Notable people with the surname include:

- André Laug (1931–1984), French designer who founded the eponymous fashion house
- Matt Laug (born 1968), American drummer

== See also ==
- Haug (surname)
- Lang (surname)
- Lauge
- Laug, a barangay in Mexico, Pampanga
