= Haug =

Haug may refer to:

== Places ==
- Haug, Minnesota, United States
- Haug Range, Greenland
- Haugsbygda, Ringerike

== Other uses ==
- Haug (surname)
