= Magne Nylenna =

Norwegian physician and professor

- Born: 12 October 1952 (age 73); Ålesund, Norway
- Occupations: Physician, professor, editor
- Awards: Nidarosprisen (1999) Den norske lægeforenings pris for forebyggende medisin (2006) Leger is samfunnsmedisinsk arbeids hederspris (2007)

Magne Nylenna (born 12 October 1952) is a Norwegian physician, organizational leader, journal editor and professor. He is professor of social medicine at the University of Oslo and Norwegian University of Science and Technology.

== Career ==
Nylenna was born in Ålesund, and graduated as dr.med. from the University of Oslo in 1988. He edited the Journal of the Norwegian Medical Association from 1987 to 2001, was secretary general for the Norwegian Medical Association from 2002 to 2003, and was principal editor of the encyclopedia Store medisinske leksikon. He is appointed professor of social medicine at the University of Oslo and Norwegian University of Science and Technology.
