= Vilhjálmsson =

Vilhjálmsson is an Icelandic and Faroese patronymic, meaning son of Vilhjálmur. In Icelandic names, the name is not strictly a surname as it is not a family name. Notable people with this name include:

- Einar Vilhjálmsson (born 1960), Icelandic Olympic javelin thrower
- Matthías Vilhjálmsson (born 1987), Icelandic footballer
- Sigmar Vilhjálmsson (born 1977), Icelandic television host
- Thor Vilhjálmsson (1925–2011), Icelandic novelist, poet, playwright, and translator
- Vilhjálmur Þ. Vilhjálmsson (born 1946), Icelandic politician; Mayor of Reykjavík 2006–07
- Thór Vilhjálmsson (1930–2015), Icelandic jurist, judge of ECtHR

== See also ==
- Vilhjálmsdóttir
