= Marius Nygaard =

Marius Nygaard may refer to:

- Marius Nygaard (academic) (1838–1912), Norwegian educator and linguist
- Marius Nygaard (judge) (1902–1978), Norwegian judge
