= Henning Mørland =

Norwegian classical scholar and translator

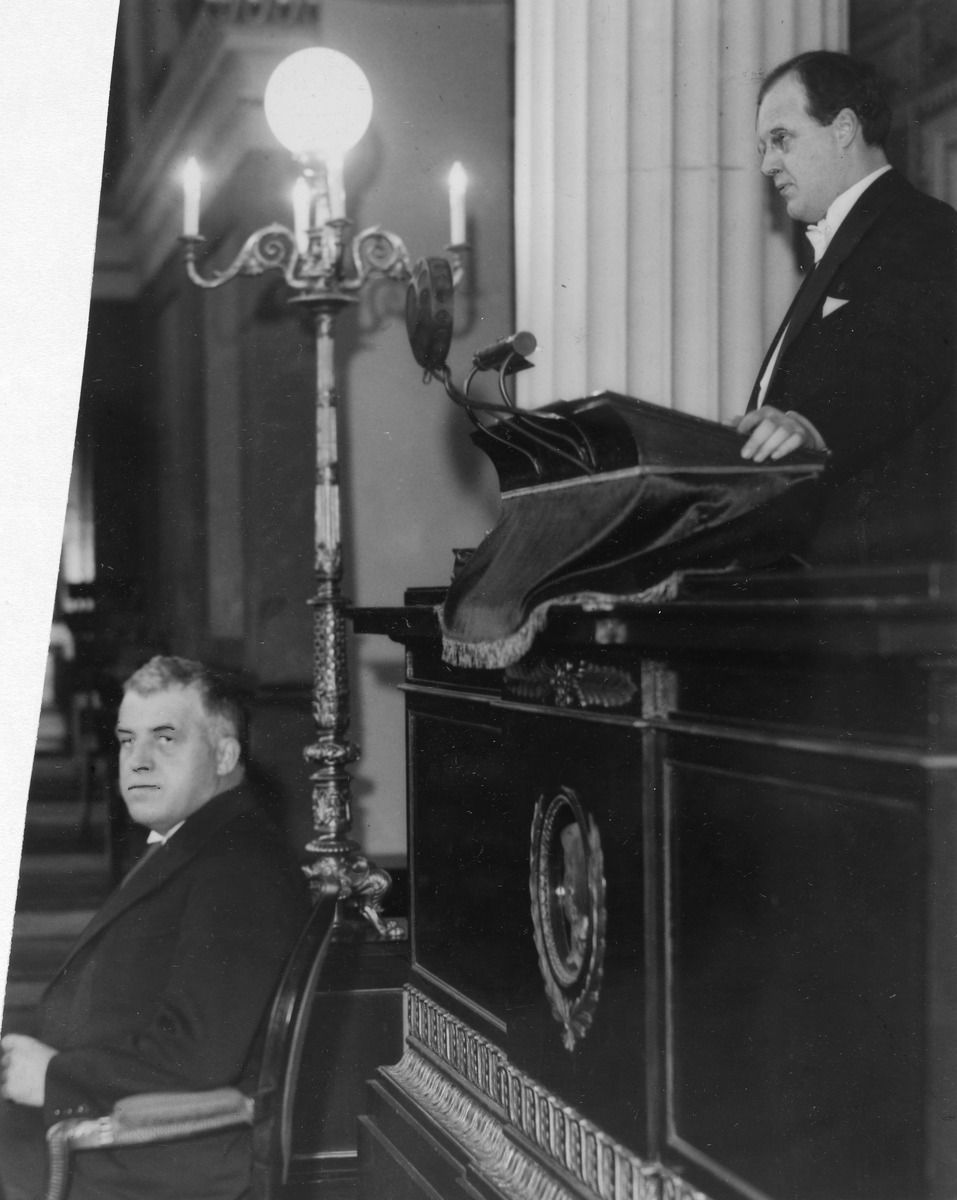
Knud Henning Mørland in 1932

Knud Henning Mørland (27 March 1903 – 22 August 1989) was a Norwegian classical scholar and translator.

Mørland graduated from high school in 1921 and received his candidatus philologiæ degree with a major in Latin and a minor in Greek and history in 1927. He studied abroad in Germany, France and Sweden where he attended seminars on Late Latin by Einar Löfstedt. He earned his PhD in 1932 with a dissertation on Latin translations of the Greek physician Oribasius. He served as professor of classical philology at the University of Oslo from 1949 to 1973. His research interests included the use of names in the works of Virgil as well as comparative constructions in Latin.

Mørland was a productive translator of classical literature at a time when few of the central works had been translated into bokmål. He published 19 volumes of translations – over 5,000 pages – comprising texts by Plato, Apuleius, Cicero, Tacitus, Herodotus and Xenophon. His translations received generally positive reviews; however, his choice to put readability first even if it meant sacrificing some of the authors' individual stylistic characteristics was sometimes criticized. His translation of the History of the Peloponnesian War was particularly praised and was re-published in 2007.

Apart from translations, Mørland also published several textbooks as well as a new edition of Latinsk ordbok, a Latin-Norwegian dictionary by Jan Johanssen, Marius Nygaard and Emil Schreiner.

Mørland was elected member of several learned societies: of the Norwegian Academy of Science and Letters in 1943, the Norwegian Academy in 1973 and the Royal Society of the Humanities at Uppsala in 1964.
