= Haug (surname) =

Haug is a surname which appears most commonly in Germany and Norway. The Norwegian name Haug derives the old Norse word haugr which can be translated to mean hill, knoll, or mound. The German surname Haug has a different etymology, probably short form of names beginning with Hug- "intelligence, understanding, spirit" (cf. Hugo, Hugbert, etc.). Other derivatives include Haugan, Hauge, Haugedal, Haugen and Haugland, all of which are common Norwegian surnames. The surname Haug is shared by several notable people:

== People ==
- Agnes Nygaard Haug (born 1933), Norwegian judge
- Anne Haug (born 1983), German professional triathlete
- Andrew Haug (born 1973), Australian market announcer and heavy metal musician
- Birger Haug (1908–1981), Norwegian high jump
- Bjørn Haug (1928–2020), Norwegian judge
- Émile Haug (1861–1927), French geologist
- Espen Haug (footballer born 1970) Norwegian footballer, now youth-coach at Strømmen IF
- Felix Haug (1952–2004), Swiss musician
- Friedrich Haug (1761-1829), German poet
- Hans Haug (1900–1967), Swiss composer
- Horst Haug (born 1946), German football player
- Ian Haug (born 1970), Australian lead guitarist in the bands Powderfinger and The Church (band)
- Jochen Haug (born 1973), German politician
- Jutta Haug (born 1951), German politician
- Knut Haug (born 1934), Norwegian politician
- Martin Haug (1827–1876), German Orientalist
- Monthei Eriksen Haug (1861–1933), Norwegian politician
- Norbert Haug (born 1952), German executive responsible for Mercedes-Benz's motorsport activities
- Sverre Haug (1907–1943), Norwegian resistance
- Thorleif Haug (1894–1934), Norwegian skier
- Wolfgang Fritz Haug (born 1936), German Marxist philosopher
- Cindy Haug (1956–2018), Norwegian experimental and children's writer
- Jacob Hvinden Haug (1880–1961), Norwegian military officer
- Linn Haug (born 1990), Norwegian snowboarder
- Marius Nygaard Haug (born 1960), Norwegian jurist
