= Carl Baudenbacher =

Swiss jurist

4th President of the European Free Trade Association Court
- In office 2003–2017
- Preceded by: Thór Vilhjálmsson
- Succeeded by: Páll Hreinsson

Personal details
- Born: 1 September 1947 (age 79) Basel, Switzerland
- Education: University of Berne; University of Zurich
- Profession: Jurist, professor

Carl Baudenbacher is a Swiss jurist. He has served as a judge of the EFTA Court from September 1995 to April 2018 and was the court's president from 2003 to 2017. He was a full professor at the University of St. Gallen from 1987 to 2013 and a permanent visiting professor at the University of Texas at Austin School of Law from 1993 to 2004.

== Career ==
=== Academia ===
Baudenbacher attended the School of Law and Economics of the University of Berne from 1967 until 1971. He received his doctorate (Ph.D.) from the University of Berne in 1978 and his habilitation from the University of Zurich in 1982. Baudenbacher was an acting law professor at several prestigious German Universities and an associate professor at the University of Kaiserslautern, Germany. He held the chair of private, commercial and economic law at the University of St Gallen HSG, Switzerland, from 1987 to 2013. He was also the managing director of the Institute of European and International Business Law at the University of St Gallen HSG from 1990 to 2014. From 1993 to 2004 Baudenbacher was a permanent visiting professor for international and European law at the University of Texas School of Law. Baudenbacher founded directed the global postgraduate program Executive Master of European and International Business Law E.M.B.L.-HSG in 1995 and directed it until 2017. Baudenbacher was also the founder and chairman of the St Gallen International Competition Law Forum ICF. From 1999 to 2007, Baudenbacher co-chaired the Vienna Globalization Symposium together with the former vice-chancellor of the Republic of Austria, Erhard Busek. He was also a visiting professor at the University of Geneva (1989-1990) and at the University of Iceland (2009-2011).

=== Judiciary ===
Baudenbacher served as a member of the Supreme Court of the Principality of Liechtenstein between 1994 and 1995. In 1995 he was appointed judge of the EFTA Court upon a proposal of the Principality of Liechtenstein. From 2003 to 2017, he served as the Court's President. The EFTA Court hears cases originating from the EFTA States which are Contracting Parties to the EEA Agreement (currently Iceland, Liechtenstein and Norway). The EEA Agreement has extended the EU single market to those EFTA States. It is based on a two pillar approach. Both pillars, the EU pillar and the EFTA pillar, have their own surveillance authority and their own court. EEA law which has been implemented into the legal orders of the EEA/EFTA States is capable of having direct effect and eventually takes precedence over conflicting national law. The EFTA Court has recognized EEA State liability. Moreover, EEA law must be interpreted in the light of fundamental rights. The EFTA Court is bound by homogeneity rules to follow or to take into account relevant ECJ case law. In the majority of its cases, it is, however, faced with novel legal questions and consequently has to ‘go first.’ There are countless references to EFTA Court case law by the ECJ, its Advocates General, the General Court and high courts in Germany, Austria, the United Kingdom, Sweden, and Switzerland. In practice, the one-sided written homogeneity rules have largely been superseded by a "unique judicial dialogue" (ECJ Advocate General Verica Trstenjak). Frequently described as a very influential member of the Court, Baudenbacher acted as the Reporting Judge in a number of landmark cases including E-16/16 Fosen-Linjen; E-3/16 Ski Taxi; E-5/16 Vigeland, E-29/15 Sorpa; E-14/15 Holship Norge AS v Norsk Transportarbeiderforbund; E-4/15 Icelandic Financial Services Association v ESA; E-27/13 Gunnarsson; E-25/13; Engilbertsson; E-15/12 Wahl; E-16/11 Icesave; E-14/11 DB Schenker; E-15/10 Posten Norge; E-9/11 Regulated Markets I; E-18/11 Irish Bank; E-14/10 Konkurrenten; E-1/10 Periscopus; E-1/06 Gaming Machines; E-3/06 Ladbrokes; E-4/04 Pedicel; E-1/04 Fokus Bank; E-2/03 Ásgeirsson; E-3/02 Paranova v Merck; E-3/00 Kelloggs; E-1/99 Finanger; E-1/98 Astra Norge; E-3/97 Opel Norge; E-2/97 Maglite.

On 16 April 2011, the leading Norwegian business paper Dagens Næringsliv referred to President Baudenbacher as "King Carl of the EEA" and as "one of Norway's most powerful men." On 21 August 2017, The Times wrote in the context of Brexit: "Carl Baudenbacher is not shy about plunging into international geopolitics. As it turns out this is a good thing."

=== Consultancy and arbitration ===
After his resignation from the EFTA Court bench, Baudenbacher has become an independent arbitrator and consultant. He has his own firm in St. Gallen (Switzerland) and is a member of Monckton Chambers, London. Baudenbacher is advising private clients including law firms. His specialties are coaching of lawyers' teams, writing legal opinions, acting as a mock trial judge. He was an arbitrator and an expert witness in international arbitration cases. Baudenbacher was the principal expert advisor to the Government of the Principality of Liechtenstein during the multilateral negotiations on the establishment of a European Economic Area (EEA) from 1990 until 1994. He also advised the President, the Government and the Parliament of the Swiss Confederation on matters of European integration, competition law and copyright law, the Israeli Government on matters of unfair competition and trademark law and the Government of the Russian Federation on competition law, the UNCTAD and the OECD on matters of competition law, the British Government and the British Parliament on Brexit, the Icelandic Government on matters of EEA law. Professor Baudenbacher has furthermore advised the Court of Justice of the Andean Community and the Government of the Republic of Chile on its project for a new constitution. In 2014, he has served as a member of the independent five member Commission of the Austrian Government which investigated the events around the Hypo Group Alpe Adria (so-called ‘Griss-Commission’). Baudenbacher is a much sought-after speaker at international conferences in particular on competition law, EU/EEA Law, and the law of international adjudication and arbitration. He is also invited on a regular basis to speak on these topics at prestigious European, American, Asian and Latin American universities (including Basel, Berne, Bucerius, Cambridge, Cologne, Fudan, Geneva, Harvard, Jagiellonian University of Kraków, King's College London, Kyoto, Oxford, Pontificia Universidad Católica del Perú-PUCP, Princeton, Tokyo, Universidad Andina Simón Bolívar, Universidad Nacional Autónoma de México-UNAM, University of Texas at Austin, University of Tokyo, Vienna, Waseda, Zurich).

== Published works ==
Baudenbacher published over 40 books and over 280 articles on European and International law, law of obligations, labour law, law of unfair competition, antitrust law, contract law, public procurement law, company law, intellectual property law, comparative law, arbitration and the law of international courts. In 2019 Baudenbacher published an op-ed harshly criticizing the Norwegian Attorney General for allegedly having worked over a 20-year period to undermine the EFTA rules and courts.

Significant publications:

- Judicial Independence. Memoirs of a European Judge, Springer 2019, https://www.springer.com/gp/book/9783030023072
- Das Schweizer EU-Komplott, Münster-Verlag 2019
- The Fundamental Principles of EEA Law. EEA-ities (ed.), Springer 2017
- Einheitliche Haftungsstandards für den privaten und den öffentlichen Sektor – Lehren aus dem Fall Hypo Alpe Adria, Zeitschrift für Finanzmarktrecht, 12/2016.
- Rechtsvergleichende Überlegungen zur Business Judgment Rule, Schweizer Zeitschrift für Wirtschafts- und Finanzmarktrecht, 01/2016 (together with L. Schwarz).
- The Handbook of EEA Law (ed.), Springer, 2016, 900 pages, ISBN 978-3-319-24341-2.
- Mit wie vielen Zungen spricht das Bundesverwaltungsgericht?, Jusletter of 2 February 2015.
- Proceedings before the European Courts in competition and State aid cases, in: Hirsch/Montag/Säcker, Competition Law: European Community Practice and Procedure, Thomson/Sweet&Maxwell 2015, (with Dirk Buschle and Moritz Am Ende).
- Der Syndikus der Gegenwart – Interessensvertreter oder Anwalt des Rechts?, NJW 17/2015, 1211-1215 (together with Philipp Speitler).
- Webseiten als dauerhafte Datenträger, GRUR Int, 6-2015, 519-528 (together with Theresa Haas).
- Verfahren vor den Europäischen Gerichtshöfen in Wettbewerbs- und Beihilfesachen, in: Bornkamm/Montag/Säcker, Münchener Kommentar Europäisches und Deutsches Wettbewerbsrecht, 2. Aufl., München 2015, 3049-3239 (with Dirk Buschle und Moritz am Ende)
- Von der Societas Leonina des römischen Rechts zu Theorie und Praxis des Moral Hazard im modernen Wirtschaftsrecht, Aktuelle Juristische Praxis (AJP) 2015, 1367–1375.
- Bericht der unabhängigen Untersuchungskommission der österreichischen Bundesregierung zur transparenten Aufklärung der Vorkommnisse rund um die Hypo Group Alpe Adria / Report of the Commission of the Austrian Government Which Investigated the Events Around the Hypo Group Alpe Adria, Wien 2014 (together wird Irmgard Griss, Manuel Ammann, Ernst-Wilhelm Contzen, and Claus-Peter Weber), 344 Seiten, mit deutscher Zusammenfassung und englischem summary (http://www.untersuchungskommission.at/).
- Courts of Regional Economic and Political Integration Agreements, in: The Oxford Handbook of International Adjudication, Cesare Romano, Karen Alter, Yuval Shany (Eds.). Oxford 2014, 250-277 (together with M.-J. Clifton).
- Optics: The refractive index of transparency in EEA law, in: Concurrences. Revue des droits de la concurrence. 2/2014, 5-6 (together with M.-J. Clifton).
- Institutionalisation of the Sectoral Agreements Switzerland-EU: Fairy Tales and the Theatre of the Absurd, European Law Reporter ELR 2014, 324-330.
- Ist die österreichische Institution der Finanzprokuratur noch zeitgemäß? (together with Theresa Haas), ELR 2014, 222 et seq.
- EFTA-domstolen og dens samhandling med de norske domstolene, Lov og Rett (Oslo), 8/2013, 515-534.
- The EFTA Court and the Court of Justice of the European Union: Coming in Parts But Winning Together, In: The Court of Justice and the Construction of Europe: Analyses and Perspectives on Sixty Years of Case-law. Court of Justice of the European Union (Ed.), The Hague 2013, 183-203.
- The EFTA Court's Relationship with the Advocates General of the European Court of Justice, in: De Rome à Lisbonne : les jurisdictions de l'Union européenne à la croisée des chemins : Mélanges en l'honneur de Paolo Mengozzi, Brussels 2013, 341 ff, ISBN 978-2-802-74053-7.
- «20 Jahre Unterzeichnung des EWR-Abkommens - Ein Vierakter mit Original-Darstellern», 2. Mai 2012 im Gasthof Löwen, Vaduz, hrsgg. von Regierung des Fürstentums Liechtenstein (Regierungschef Klaus Tschütscher) und EFTA-Gerichtshof (Präsident Carl Baudenbacher), Schaan 2012. Mit Beiträgen von Klaus Tschütscher, Hans Brunhart, S.D. Prinz Nikolaus von und zu Liechtenstein, Claus-Dieter Ehlermann, Franz Blankart, Knut Almestad, Sven Norberg, Roland Marxer, Mario Frick, Carl Baudenbacher, Kurt Jäger, Andreas Batliner, Marino Baldi.
- Swiss Economic Law Facing the Challenges of International and European Law, 2012 ZSR 131(2), 419-673.
- Some Thoughts on the EFTA Court's Phases of Life, in: Judicial Protection in the European Economic Area, EFTA Court (Ed.), Stuttgart 2012, 2-28, ISBN 978-3-941-38910-6.
- Суд Европейской Ассоциации Свободной Торговли Журнал Зарубежного Законодательства и Сравнительного Правоведения, No.6 (31), 2011. С. 4-20.
- Kritische Bemerkungen zum geplanten Bundeswettbewerbsgericht, Jusletter of 11 July 2011.
- Länderbericht Schweiz, in: Lauterkeitsrecht in Europa. Eine Sammlung von Länderberichten zum Recht gegen unlauteren Wettbewerb, Schmidt-Kessel, M., Schubmehl, S. (Hrsg.) München 2011, S.585-631.
- Switzerland as a Spearhead of Competition Law in Europe?, European Law Reporter ELR No. 4/2011, 114 et seq.
- The EFTA Court in Action - Five Lectures, Stuttgart: German Law Publishers 2010, ISBN 978-3-941389-04-5.
- European State Aid and Merger Control in the Financial Crisis - From Negative to Positive Integration (with Frank Bremer), Journal of European Competition Law & Practice (JECLAP), Vol. 1 No. 4, 2010, 267-285.
- Overcoming the financial crisis in the banking sector, The role of European Competition Policy (with Frank Bremer), Concurrences No 2/2010, 45-52.
- Evaluation des Kartellgesetzes: Institutionelles Setting -Vertikale Abreden - Sanktionierung von Einzelpersonen - Zivilrechtliche Verfahren, Strukturberichterstattung des Staatssekretariats für Wirtschaft, Nr. 44/3, Bern: Staatssekretariat für Wirtschaft, SECO 2009 (with an English summary).
- Dispute Resolution, Stuttgart, 2009.
- The EFTA Court, the ECJ, and the Latter's Advocates General – a Tale of Judicial Dialogue, in: Continuity and Change in EU Law. Essays in Honour of Sir Francis Jacobs, edited by Anthony Arnull, Piet Eckhout and Takis Tridimas, Oxford 2008, 90 et seq. ISBN 978-0-199-21903-2.
- The CFI's Gencor Judgment – Some Remarks on its Global Implications, in: Carl Baudenbacher, Claus Gulmann, Koen Lenaerts, Emmanuel Coulon, Eric Barbier de la Serre, eds., Liber Amicorum en l’honneur de Bo Vesterdorf, Bruxelles 2007, 543 et seq. ISBN 978-2-802-72438-4.
- State liability as European ius commune: The Case of the European Economic Area, in: Fedke, Jörg and Sir Markesinis, Basil (eds.), Patterns of Regionalism and Federalism: Lessons for the UK, The Clifford Chance Lectures, Vol. VIII, Oxford and Portland Oregon 2006, 191–199. ISBN 978-1-841-13470-3.
- The Implementation of Decisions of the ECJ and of the EFTA Court in Member States' Domestic Legal Orders, Symposium Article, Symposium Globalization and the Judiciary, 40 Tex. Int'l L.J 2005. 383 et seq.
- The EFTA Court: An Actor in the European Judicial Dialogue, 28 Fordham International Law Journal, 353–391 (2005).
- Facets of an EEA Constitutional Order, in: Colneric, Ninon; Edward, David; Puissochet, Jean-Pierre; Ruiz-Jarabo Colomer, Dámaso (Eds.), Une communauté de droit, Festschrift für Gil Carlos Rodriguez Iglesias, Berlin: Berliner Wissenschafts-Verlag, 2003, 343 et seq. ISBN 3-8305-0606-6.
- Judicialization of European Competition Policy, in: International Antitrust Law & Policy, 2002 Corporate Law Institute, Fordham University School of Law, 353 et seq.
- Immaterialgüterrecht und Handelspolitik, ZSR N.F. Bd. 120, 2001, I. HB, 207 et seq.
- Lauterkeitsrecht, Kommentar zum Bundesgesetz gegen den unlauteren Wettbewerb (UWG), Helbing & Lichtenhahn: Basel/Genf/München; WIV Wirtschaftswissenschaftlicher Verlag: St.Gallen/Berlin 2001, 1350 pages.
- Wirtschafts-, schuld- und verfahrensrechtliche Grundprobleme der allgemeinen Geschäftsbedingungen, Habilitationsschrift Zürich: Schulthess Polygraphischer Verlag 1983, ISBN 3-7255-2332-0.
- Suggestivwerbung und Lauterkeitsrecht, Schweizer Schriften zum Handels- und Wirtschaftsrecht 28, Diss. Bern, Zürich: Schulthess Polygraphischer Verlag 1978, ISBN 3-7255-1935-8.

Commemorative:

- The Art of Judicial Reasoning, Festschrift in Honour of Carl Baudenbacher, Selvik, G., Clifton, M.-J., Haas, T., Lourenço, L., Schwiesow, K. (Eds.), Springer 2019
- Economic Law and Justice in Times of Globalisation: Festschrift for Carl Baudenbacher, edited by Mario Monti, Nikolaus von und zu Liechtenstein, Bo Versterdorf, Jay Westbrook, Luzius Wildhaber (Editor), Baden-Baden/Bern/Wien 2007.

== Awards and honours ==
- 1978: Walther Hug Award for one of the best doctoral law dissertations in Switzerland
- 1997: Eason Weinmann Endowed Lecture at the University of Tulane Law School
- 2003: Cross of Honour for Science and Art First Class of the Republic of Austria
- 2003: Carl H. Fulda award for excellence in international law, Texas International Law Journal
- 2004: Small States Prize of the Herbert-Batliner-Europainstitut in Salzburg
- 2007: Gold Star for Merit from the Land of Vienna
- 2012: Dr. rer. pol. honoris causae of Leuphana University of Lüneburg
- 2015, 2016 and 2017: Listed as one of Switzerland's 15 most influential intellectuals by Basler Zeitung
- 2016: 42nd Annual Lecture of the Centre for European Law, King's College, London
- 2018: Commanders Cross (Stórriddarakross) of the Falcon Order of the Republic of Iceland
- 2018: Commander's Cross with the Star of the Princely Liechtenstein Order of Merit
- 2019: Sir Jeremy Lever lecture, University of Oxford

Legal offices
Preceded by Thór Vilhjálmsson	President of the European Free Trade Association Court; 2003–2017	Succeeded by Páll Hreinsson
