= André Laug =

Italian fashion house

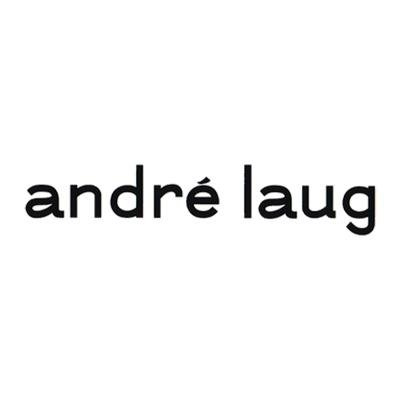
- Company type: Private
- Industry: Fashion; Leisure
- Founded: 1968
- Founders: André Laug
- Headquarters: Rome, Italy
- Area served: Worldwide
- Website: www.andrelaug.com

André Laug is an Italian fashion house founded in 1968 by the eponymous French designer.

== History ==
=== Founding ===
The company was founded in 1968 when André Laug (Alsace, 29 December 1931 – Rome, 16 December 1984), a French designer trained in Paris by André Courrèges and Nina Ricci, opened his couture house in Rome, Piazza di Spagna, with the help of Susy Gandini.

== 1969–1978 ==
In 1969 Laug concluded the first agreements with foreign buyers, including Elizabeth Arden, Bergdorf Goodman, Saks Fifth Avenue and Martha Phillips, who introduced the brand in the United States market. Laug became one of Audrey Hepburn reference designers and dedicated to her one of his ready-to-wear lines, the "Audrey".

Famous fashion models as Benedetta Barzini, Mirella Petteni Haggiag and Linda Morand starred in his runway shows and posed for him for fashion magazine Vogue.

After his suits, in 1970 Laug launched women's blouses, sold in the US at US$2,500. In 1972 Vogue ran a feature article on his collection, photographed by Oliviero Toscani.

His clients at the time included Audrey Hepburn, American First Ladies Jackie Kennedy and Barbara Bush, Lee Radziwill, Diana Ross, Kathy Hilton, Estée Lauder, Carroll Baker, Princess Ira von Fürstenberg, Mia d'Acquarone et de Riencourt, Anna and Alice Bulgari, Margaret Trudeau, Helietta Caracciolo, Rossella Falk, Paulette Goddard, and Capucine.

The Laug collections from 1974 were inspired by Russia and the Tzar. In 1975, while the new English punk trend arrived in Europe, Laug created a feminine version of the tuxedo. At the end of year in New York, at Rizzoli on Fifth Avenue, Roberto Polo and Diana Vreeland, editor of Vogue US, organized an exhibition of "creative fashion". Fashion designers and artists invited from several countries took part with works created or selected exclusively for the exhibition. Italy was represented by Pino Lancetti, Valentino and Laug.

In July 1976, Laug presented a new "high fashion ready-to-wear" line (a ready-to-wear hand made collection, but on size) on a set staged by Vogue alongside works by Michelangelo Pistoletto, with the photo shoot by Norman Parkinson)

In the late seventies, André Laug refined his style proposing softer and more colorful items. His novelty for the winter season of 1978, marabou, also influenced the dresses created by the designer for the Italian-French film La Cage aux Folles,(Il Vizietto) conceptualized by costume designer Piero Tosi, who won the nomination for best costume design at the 1980 Academy Awards.

At the end of the year, Laug celebrated the tenth anniversary of his company in Italy with a dinner in Milan with American buyers and international press. The company at the time had a full-time staff of one hundred employees.

== 1979–1984 and Laug's death ==
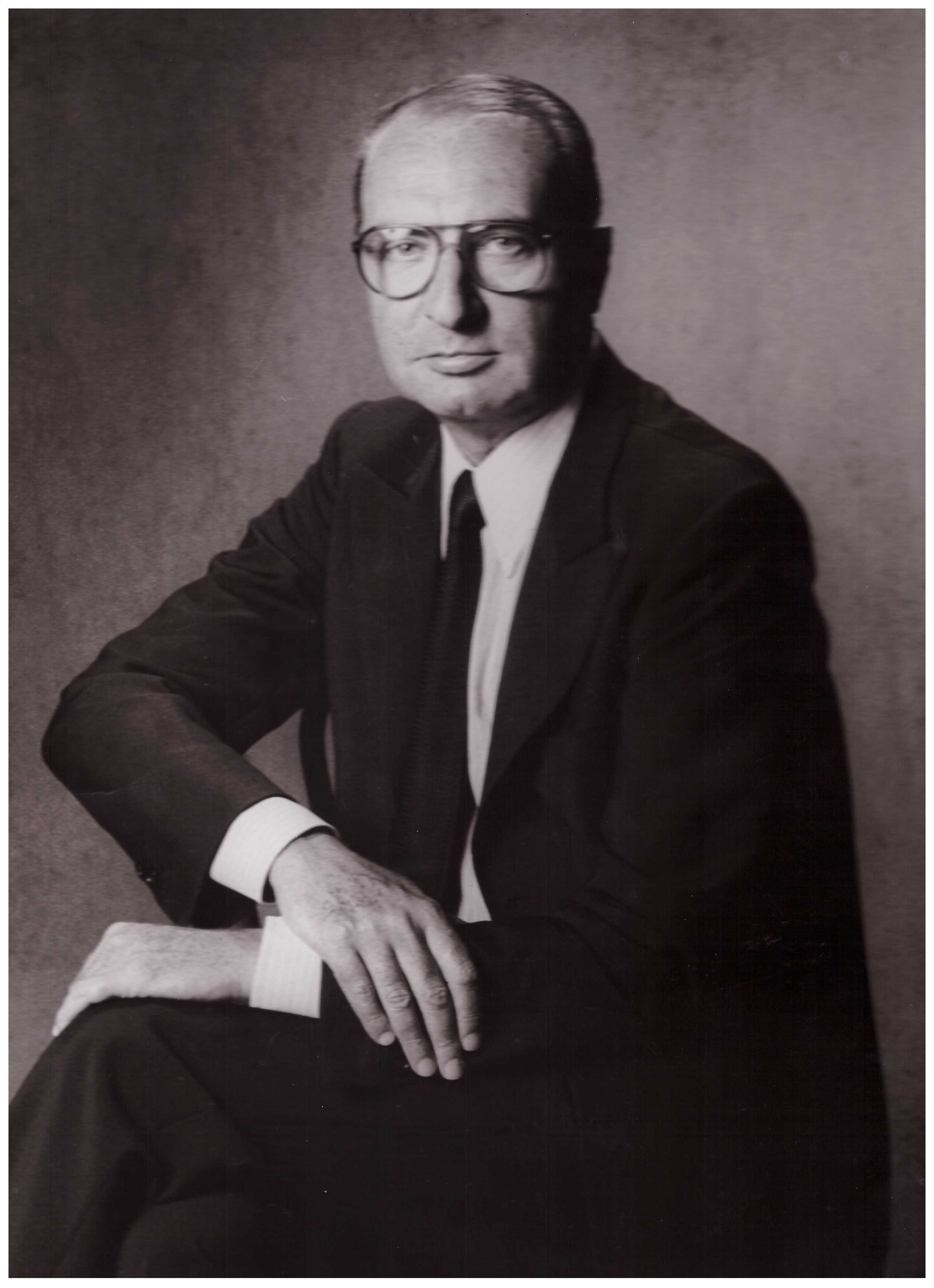
Fashion Designer André Laug

In the early eighties Laug focused on coat dresses. The novelty was featured by Harper's Bazaar.

In 1982, the model Susan Hess posed with Laug clothes in a photo shoot for Vogue. Other supermodels who worked with Laug included Pat Cleveland, Gia Carangi, Linda Evangelista, Brooke Shields, Yasmin Le Bon, Jerry Hall, Susan Hess, Iman and a young Uma Thurman.

In December 1982, photographer Helmut Newton ran a photo shoot of a short story written by Natalia Aspesi in Vogue, on contemporary women, with models dressed by Laug. In 1984, Laug launched modern art designs inspired by Matisse.

On the night of 15–16 December of the same year, Laug died at his home in Rome from a heart attack, at the age of 53.

== From Olivier management until today ==
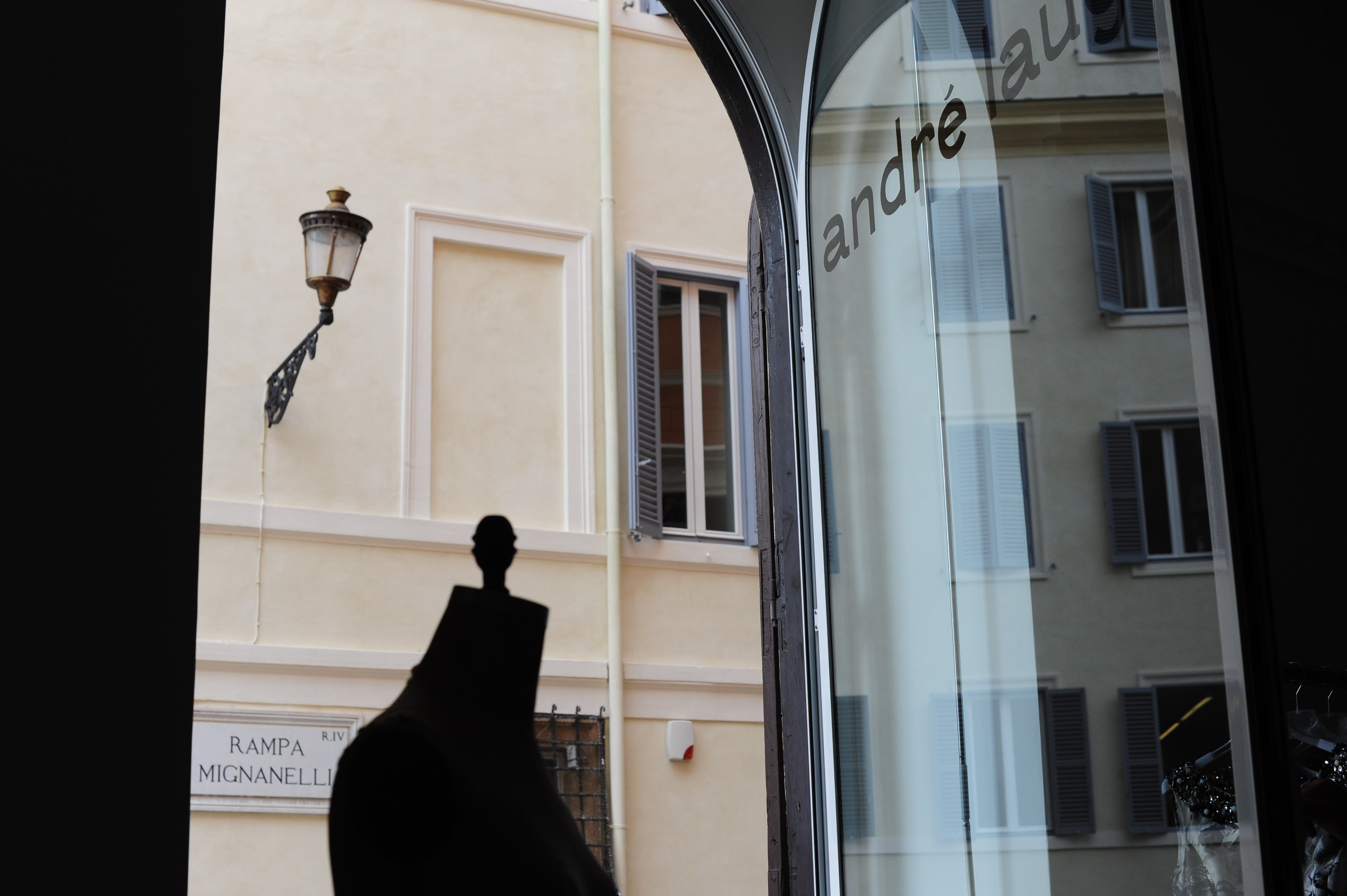
André Laug shop window in Rome, Rampa Mignanelli

Following Laug's death, entrepreneur Giancarlo Rossetti (known as "Olivier") took over as president of the company. Olivier called upon Laura della Croce di Dojola to work with him, making up a team of three designers and two communication managers. The company, with 83 collections of high fashion and luxury ready-to-wear, started again using the drawings left by the designer.

From the collection of sketches left by Laug, Olivier developed new collections. Olivier proposed a line of ready-to-wear clothes very similar to a luxury product, almost high fashion. The house also launched a line of women's clothes at a lower price: the "André Laug Chic" line was distributed to nearly 230 stores in Europe. Japan and North America. The brand also debuted on television: Laug created the yellow dress of the Ferrero Rocher chocolates commercial. His chiffon blouses were sold to three million lire (approx. US$1,800 at the time) in stores in New York, Washington, Palo Alto, Houston and Palm Beach.

We are the last, along with Yves Saint Laurent, who can ask such figures: rather than sell an item for 1 million liras, I'd prefer to swallow it.

— Olivier,

In the nineties and early twenty-first century, the US remained the primary market of the company, along with the Middle East. In 2005, Rossetti died in Rome, and the company passed to his heirs. In addition to fashion, the company also sells wedding dresses (robes de mariée). In 2015 the André Laug company moved to a new showroom in Rome in Rampa Mignanelli, close to Spanish Steps.

Some André Laug dresses are preserved at the MET - Metropolitan Museum in New York.

== See also ==
- Italian fashion
- Made in Italy
