= Hanne Sophie Greve =

Norwegian judge

Hanne Sophie Greve, Norwegian judge

Hanne Sophie Greve (born 14 April 1952 in Tønsberg, Norway) is a Norwegian judge.

She graduated as cand.jur. in (1976) and later (1988) dr. juris at the University of Bergen. She was judge at the European Court of Human Rights in Strasbourg from 1998 to 2004.

Before she was appointed to the position in Strasbourg, she was a judge at Gulating Court of Appeal and was involved in a number of national and international projects where human rights were in focus.

Her doctoral thesis was about refugees from Cambodia, a subject about which she has shown a particular interest and written about on various occasions.

Greve published in 2025 the book "Villedet“ on an alleged red herring manoeuver originating with Winston Churchill, concerning an allied invasion in 1942 during World War II. Greve is of the opinion that this invasion never was anything other than a distraction, a distraction that cost the lives of several hundred Norwegians, among which the inhabitants of a fiskevær in the Vestlandet region of the country.

On 30 April 2007 Greve stated that Norway has come to be perceived as a haven for international war criminals just like the South American countries after World War II. This statement was given in a TV documentary on Norway's TV 2

In 1995 she was awarded the Fritt Ord Award.

== Bibliography ==
- Kampuchean refugees 'between the tiger and the crocodile' : international law and the overall scope of one refugee situation (1988)
- Land tenure and property rights in Cambodia (1993)
- Frihet fra lenker: arbeid for menneskets rettigheter: professor Thorolf Raftos stiftelse 1986-1996 ISBN 82-7674-149-5

Awards
Preceded by William Nygaard	Recipient of the Fritt Ord Award; 1995	Succeeded by Arne Skouen
