= Academy of European Law =

International centre for training and debate for lawyers

Academy of European Law (ERA)
- Europäische Rechtsakademie
- Type: Public foundation
- Established: 1992
- Director: Jean-Philippe Rageade
- Administrative staff: 80
- Address: Metzer Allee 4, D-54295 Trier, Germany, Trier, Germany
- Campus: Trier, [[]]
- Website: era.int

The Academy of European Law (German: Europäische Rechtsakademie, ERA) is an international centre for training and debate for lawyers. A public foundation based in Trier, Germany, its objective is to promote the awareness, understanding and good practice of European law.

== Profile ==
ERA's goal is to enable legal practitioners to gain a deeper knowledge of the diverse aspects of European law through conferences, seminars, study visits, language courses and e-learning projects, many of them multilingual. Attendees at the events, taking place at the Academy's conference centre in Trier, in Brussels and other European cities, include judges, prosecutors, lawyers in private practice, notaries, in-house counsel, law enforcement officers, lawyers in public administration and other legal practitioners. The Academy also provides a forum for the discussion of proposals and developments of legal policy at the European level and thus contributes to the creation of a pan-European public sphere.

== History ==
The Academy's genesis was closely associated with the accelerating pace of European integration and the completion of the internal market. In 1990, the European Parliament recommended that the European Commission invest in a centre for the continuing education of lawyers in order to improve the consistent application of European law. In 1991 the Parliament endorsed a proposal drawn up by a number of MEPs and politicians from Luxembourg and the German Land of Rhineland-Palatinate to establish an Academy of European Law in Trier, Germany, close to the European Court of Justice in Luxembourg. The Academy was set up in 1992 as a public foundation. The founding patrons were the Grand Duchy of Luxembourg, the Land of Rhineland-Palatinate and the City of Trier. They were soon joined by the other German Länder, the federal state of Germany and, from 2000 on, by other Member States of the European Union. Today, all 28 EU Member States are patrons of the Academy.

== Structure and governance ==
The Academy's training events are designed and implemented by an international team of lawyers divided into four sections: European private law, European business law, European criminal law and European public law. Speakers are drawn from a Europe-wide network of experts, leading professionals and lawmakers. Besides revenue from its conferences, publications and interest on foundation capital, a significant share of the Academy's budget is made up of support from the European Union and the Land of Rhineland-Palatinate.

Former European Commission president Jacques Santer is the president of the Academy's Governing Board, which is responsible for fundamental policy decisions and approval of the budget. Pauliine Koskelo, Judge at the European Court of Human Rights, Strasbourg, is chairwoman of its Board of Trustees. The Academy's director is Jean-Philippe Rageade.

== Activities and publications ==
ERA publishes the quarterly legal journal ERA Forum in cooperation with Springer Science+Business Media.
