= ERA Forum =

ERA Forum is a quarterly law journal published by Springer Science+Business Media on behalf of the Academy of European Law. The journal contains articles from presentations delivered at ERA's conferences. Most articles are published in English; however, articles in French and German are also included with English abstracts.
