= Marius Nygaard (judge) =

Norwegian judge

Marius Nygaard (1 June 1902 – 27 March 1978) was a Norwegian judge.

He enrolled as a student in 1920 and graduated with the cand.jur. degree in 1924. He worked as a deputy judge from 1925 to 1927, as a secretary in the Norwegian Ministry of Justice and the Police from 1927 to 1935 and an auxiliary judge from 1935 to 1936. He then worked as an assistant secretary in the Ministry of Justice from 1936 to 1945, and then as a deputy under-secretary of state from 1945. From 1949 to 1972 he served as a Supreme Court Justice.

He chaired the Norwegian Association of Judges from 1953 to 1956, and was a board member of the Nordisk Administrativt Forbund from 1938 to 1949. From 1936 to 1945 he was a secretary of the latter organization in Norway. He was a supervisory council member of Oslo Sparebank from 1944, and chaired it from 1969. In 1965 he was decorated with the Royal Norwegian Order of St. Olav.

He was a son of presiding judge Finn Nygaard (1873–1967), and thereby a grandson of the academic Marius Nygaard. He was also a nephew of publisher and politician William Nygaard and a first cousin of publisher Mads Wiel Nygaard. His sister Ella Nygaard was married for some years to Torfinn Denstad. In 1932 Marius Nygaard married Eva Julie Johanne Christensen, daughter of Oscar von Munthe af Morgenstierne and Eva Christensen. Their daughter Agnes Nygaard married judge Bjørn Haug (born 1928), and had a daughter Charlotte Haug, editor of the Journal of the Norwegian Medical Association, and a son Marius Nygaard Haug, a notable jurist.
