= Leif Sevón =

Finnish jurist and judge

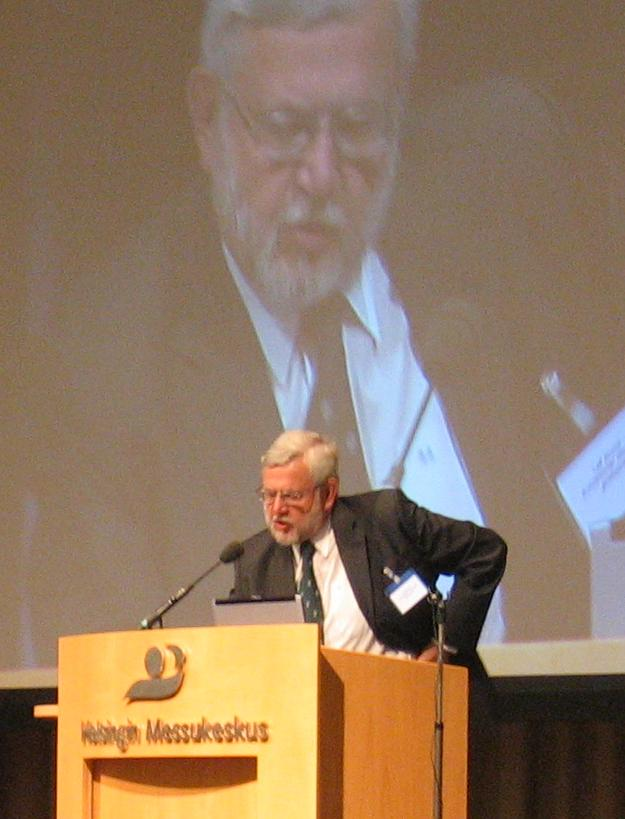

11th President of the Supreme Court of Finland
- In office 1 January 2002 – 31 December 2005
- Preceded by: Olavi Heinonen
- Succeeded by: Pauliine Koskelo

1st President of the European Free Trade Association Court
- In office 1994–1995
- Preceded by: Office established
- Succeeded by: Bjørn Haug

Personal details
- Born: 31 October 1941 (age 84) Helsinki, Finland
- Education: University of Helsinki

Leif Jörgen Arvidsson Sevón (born 31 October 1941) is a Finland-Swedish jurist and judge.

== Biography ==
Sevón holds a Licentiate in Laws degree from the University of Helsinki. His positions include a directorate at the Ministry of Justice, the presidency of the EFTA Court, a seat in the European Court of Justice, and an advisory position at the Ministry of Foreign Affair's Trade Directorate. He left the European Court in 2002 after his appointment as President of the Supreme Court of Finland. In 2005 he retired from the presidency of the Supreme Court.

== See also ==
- List of members of the European Court of Justice
