= Páll Hreinsson =

5th President of the European Free Trade Association Court
- Incumbent
- Assumed office 2018
- Preceded by: Carl Baudenbacher

Personal details
- Born: 20 February 1963 (age 63) Iceland
- Education: University of Iceland; University of Copenhagen
- Occupation: Lawyer, jurist

Páll Hreinsson (born 20 February 1963) is the current president of the EFTA Court in Luxembourg. He is a former justice at the Supreme Court of Iceland and professor at the University of Iceland.

== Education ==
Páll graduated from Hamrahlíð College in 1983. He received a Cand. Juris degree from the University of Iceland in 1988. He was a visitor student in administrative law and public administration at the University of Copenhagen from 1990 to 1991 and received his doctorate (dr. juris) from the University of Iceland in 2005.

== Career ==
Páll was an assistant judge at the City Court of Reykjavík from 1988 until 1991, and special assistant to the Althing Ombudsman (The Parliamentary Ombudsman‘s Office) from 1991 to 1998. He became the chairman of the Computer Committee in 1999 and held that post until 2001. He was also the chairman of the board of the Data Protection Authority from 2001 until 2011 and the chairman of the Information Committee from 2005 until 2007. In 1996 he became an adjunct professor at the Faculty of Law of the University of Iceland and a professor of law in 1999. He was the vice-dean of the Faculty of Law from 2002 until 2005, and the Dean of the same faculty from 2005 until 2007. In September 2007 he became a justice at the Supreme Court of Iceland. In December 2008 he was appointed the chairman of Althing’s Special Investigation Commission, investigating the causes of the 2008 financial crash in Iceland. While chairing that committee he took a leave of absence from the Supreme Court. Páll has been a judge at the EFTA Court in Luxembourg since 15 September 2011. On 1 January 2018 he became the president of the EFTA Court.

Páll is a prolific legal scholar and has written extensively on various legal subjects. He has written 13 academic books and 43 peer-reviewed articles on legal matters in both Icelandic and English, mostly focusing on administrative law, constitutional law and the law of obligations.
