= EFTA Court =

Supranational tribunal of EFTA states

- Established: 1994
- Location: Rue du Fort Thuengen; 1499 Kirchberg, Luxembourg City; Luxembourg
- Authorised by: Agreement between the EFTA States on the Establishment of a Surveillance Authority and a Court of Justice
- Judge term length: 6 years, renewable
- Number of positions: 3+6
- Website: www.eftacourt.int

President
- Currently: Páll Hreinsson
- Since: 2018

The EFTA Court is a supranational judicial body responsible for the three EFTA members who are also members of the European Economic Area (EEA): Iceland, Liechtenstein and Norway.

As members of the EEA, the three countries participate in the European single market of the European Union. Consequently, they are subject to a number of European laws. Enforcement of these laws would normally be carried out by the European Court of Justice (ECJ); however, there were legal difficulties in giving Union institutions powers over non-members so the EFTA Court was set up to perform this role instead of the ECJ. EFTA does not envisage political integration. It does not issue legislation, nor does it establish a customs union. Schengen is not a part of the EEA Agreement. However, all of the four EFTA States participate in Schengen and Dublin through bilateral agreements. They all apply the provisions of the relevant Acquis.

Since September 1995, the Court has consisted of three judges and six ad hoc judges. They are nominated by the three members and appointed by their governments collectively through common accord.

According to Article 108(2) of the EEA Agreement of 2 May 1992, the EFTA States taking part in the EEA Agreement shall establish a court of justice. That obligation was complied with by the conclusion of the "Surveillance and Court Agreement" (SCA), cf. Art. 27. The EFTA Court was originally designed for the then seven EFTA States Austria, Finland, Iceland, Liechtenstein, Norway, Sweden and Switzerland. On 1 January 1994, upon the entry into force of the EEA Agreement, the EFTA Court took up its functions with five judges nominated by Austria, Finland, Iceland, Norway and Sweden. Switzerland was unable to ratify the EEA Agreement due to a negative referendum. Liechtenstein postponed membership until 1 May 1995. In 1995, Austria, Finland and Sweden left EFTA and joined the EU. Since September 1995, the EFTA Court has consisted of three judges and six ad hoc judges nominated by the three actual EEA/EFTA States Iceland, Liechtenstein and Norway and appointed by their Governments through common accord.

When the EEA Agreement entered into force on 1 January 1994, the seat of the Court was the old EFTA capital Geneva. After the accession of Austria, Finland and Sweden to the European Union, it was decided to move the Court's seat to Luxembourg, where the European Court of Justice and the General Court are located. On 1 September 1996, the EFTA Court moved to Luxembourg.

== Organization ==
The EFTA Court is an independent judicial body, established under the "Surveillance and Court Agreement" (SCA) to ensure judicial oversight of the EEA Agreement in the EEA/EFTA States. It came into operation following the entry into force of the EEA Agreement on 1 January 1994, and it has essentially been modelled on a 1994 version of the European Court of Justice. The main difference is that it has no Advocates General.

=== Judges ===
The EFTA Court consists of 3 permanent judges. Each EEA/EFTA State has the right to nominate one candidate for the position. The Judges are appointed by common accord of the governments of the EEA/EFTA States for a renewable term of six years. In 2016, Norway tried to re-elect Per Christiansen for a term of only three years, officially in conformity with the Norwegian age limit of 70. However, following criticism that this was really to punish him for ruling against Oslo in a series of controversial cases, Norway reversed its position and the Norwegian was re-appointed for the usual term of six years. The judges are chosen from persons whose independence is beyond doubt and who possess the qualifications required for appointment to the highest judicial offices in their respective countries or who are jurisconsults of recognized competence. A further six ad hoc judges are also chosen, pursuant to Article 30 SCA. One of the six ad hoc judge is called upon to sit if a regular judge is prevented from participating in a case due to bias or illness. Each judge has his or her cabinet which consists of the judge and at least one legal secretary and an administrative assistant. The following is a list of current and former EFTA Court Judges:

| Name | Home state | Appointed to current position |
|---|---|---|
| Bjørn Haug | Norway | 1994 – 1999 |
| Kurt Herndl | Austria | 1994 – 1995 |
| Sven Norberg | Sweden | 1994 – 1995 |
| Leif Sevón | Finland | 1994 – 1995 |
| Thor Vilhjálmsson | Iceland | 1994 – 2002 |
| Gustav Bygglin | Finland | 1995 |
| Per Tresselt | Norway | 2000 – 2005 |
| Thorgeir Örlygsson | Iceland | 2003 – 2011 |
| Henrik Bull | Norway | 2006 – 2011 |
| Carl Baudenbacher | Liechtenstein | 1995 – 2018 |
| Per Christiansen | Norway | 2011 – present |
| Páll Hreinsson | Iceland | 2011 – present |
| Bernd Hammermann | Liechtenstein | 2018 – present |

=== President ===
The judges elect, by secret ballot, one of their colleagues to be President of the Court for a term of three years. The President may be re-elected. He or she directs the judicial business and the administration of the Court. The President assigns the cases to a judge to act as a rapporteur. He or she sets the dates and timetable for the sessions of the Court, presides at hearings and deliberations. The President is competent to take decisions on requests for the application of interim measures. Presidents of the EFTA Court include:

- Leif Sevón (Finland) 1994
- Bjørn Haug (Norway) 1995–1999
- Thór Vilhjálmsson (Iceland) 2000–2002
- Carl Baudenbacher (Liechtenstein) 2003–2017
- Páll Hreinsson (Iceland), 2018 – present

=== Registry ===
The Court appoints a Registrar for a period of three years, after which he or she may be reappointed. The Registrar assists the Court in procedural matters, and is the head of personnel. He or she is responsible for the Registry as well as for the receipt, transmission and custody of documents and pleadings. The Registrar is also responsible for the Court's archives and publications, for the administration of the Court, its financial management and its accounts. The Registrar supports the judges in their official and representative functions. The operation of the Court is in the hands of officials and other servants who are responsible to the Registrar under the authority of the President. The Court administers its own infrastructure and its own budget.

Registrars of the Court:

- Karin Hökborg (Sweden), 1994 – 1995
- Per Christiansen (Norway), 1995 – 1998
- Gunnar Selvik (Norway), 1998 – 2001
- Lucien Dedichen (Norway), 2001 – 2004
- Henning Harborg (Norway), 2004 – 2007
- Skúli Magnússon (Iceland), 2007 – 2012
- Gunnar Selvik (Norway), 2012 – 2018
- Ólafur Jóhannes Einarsson (Iceland), 2018 – present

== Jurisdiction ==
The EFTA Court's Statute and its Rules of Procedure are modelled on those of the European Court of Justice. Individuals and economic operators have broad access to the Court. The EFTA Court is in particular competent to decide on:

- Actions brought by the EFTA Surveillance Authority against an EFTA State for infringement of the EEA Agreement or the Surveillance and Court Agreement. The commencement of proceedings before the EFTA Court is preceded by a preliminary procedure conducted by the EFTA Surveillance Authority, which gives the EFTA State concerned the opportunity to reply to the complaints against it. If that procedure does not result in termination of the infringement by the Member State, the EFTA Surveillance Authority may bring an action for breach of EEA law before the EFTA Court. If the Court finds that an obligation has not been fulfilled, the EFTA State concerned must terminate the breach without delay;
- Actions concerning the settlement of disputes between two or more EFTA States regarding the interpretation or application of the EEA Agreement, the Agreement on a Standing Committee of the EFTA States or the present Agreement;
- Actions for nullity brought by an EFTA State or an individual or legal person against a decision of the EFTA Surveillance Authority;
- Actions for failure to act brought by an EFTA State or a natural or legal person against the EFTA Surveillance Authority. Judgments in direct actions are final and binding, and the parties to the dispute are required to comply with them;
- Moreover, the EFTA Court has jurisdiction to give judgment in the form of an advisory opinion on the interpretation of the EEA Agreement upon a request of a national court of an EEA/EFTA State (unless prohibited by that State's law). The referring national court will then decide the case before it based on the EFTA Court's answer. Judgments in the form of an advisory opinion are not legally binding on the national court. However, in practice, they carry the same force as the preliminary rulings rendered by the European Court of Justice under Article 267 TFEU.

=== Expedited Procedure and Accelerated Procedure cases ===
In direct action cases, on application by the applicant or the defendant, the President may exceptionally decide that a case is to be determined pursuant to an expedited procedure derogating from the Rules of Procedure where the particular urgency of the case requires the Court to give its ruling with the minimum of delay. This ensures that the case is prioritised so that the Court's judgment can be given as soon as possible in the best interests of justice.

In preliminary reference cases, at the request of the national court, the President may exceptionally decide to apply an accelerated procedure derogating from the Rules of Procedure. Just like expedited direct action cases, the accelerated preliminary reference procedure ensures that the case is prioritised so that the Court's judgment can be given to the referring national court as soon as possible in the best interests of justice.

== The homogeneity goal ==
The EEA is based in a two pillar structure, the EU constituting one pillar and the three participating EFTA States the other. In substance, the EEA Agreement has extended the EU single market to the participating EFTA States. EEA law is therefore largely identical to EU law. In order to secure a level playing field for individuals and economic operators in both pillars, special homogeneity provisions have been laid down in the EEA Agreement and in the Surveillance and Court Agreement. Under these rules, the EFTA Court shall follow the relevant case law of the ECJ on provisions of Union law that are identical in substance to provisions of EEA law rendered prior to the date of signature of the EEA Agreement (2 May 1992) and shall pay due account to the principles laid down by the European Court of Justice's relevant case law rendered after that date. The EFTA Court's jurisprudence is in fact based on the case law of the European Court of Justice (ECJ). The politically important distinction between old and new ECJ case law has largely been qualified in practice. The EFTA Court also refers to the case law of the General Court of the European Union (EGC). All three EEA courts (ECJ, EGC, EFTA Court) have not only emphasized the need for a uniform interpretation of EU and EEA law, but have actively seen to it that homogeneity is preserved.

The EFTA Court has in the majority of its cases been faced with legal issues that have not (or at least not fully) been decided by the ECJ. The EEA Agreement does not contain a written rule that would oblige the ECJ to take into account the case law of the EFTA Court when interpreting EU or EEA law. In practice, both Union Courts (the ECJ and the EGC), have, however, made reference to EFTA Court jurisprudence. As to the interpretation of EEA law, the Union courts have referred to judgments by the EFTA Court concerning the legal nature of the EEA Agreement, the principle of State liability in EEA law, the free movement of goods and the freedom of establishment.

When interpreting EU law, the Union Courts found support in the jurisprudence of the EFTA Court in cases concerning the Directive on Television without Frontiers, the Directive on Transfer of Undertakings, the precautionary principle in foodstuff law (see Pedicel case infra), and the selectivity criterion in State aid law. Advocates General of the European Court of Justice have also entered a judicial dialogue with the EFTA Court. Conversely, the EFTA Court regularly refers to Opinions of Advocates General.

== Methods of interpretation ==
Like the ECJ, the EFTA Court does not follow the rules laid down in Articles 31 and 32 of the 1969 Vienna Convention on the Law of Treaties when interpreting EEA law, but rather the methodological rules usually applied by national supreme and constitutional courts. Teleological (or purposive) interpretation is particularly important, but also dynamic interpretation is not uncommon. Finally, the EFTA Court's case law also displays some comparative US-EU law analysis, as seen in Case E-07/13 Creditinfo Lánstraust, where conditions for the re-use of public sector information are compared to those of the 1966 US Freedom of Information Act.

== Notable cases ==
=== Effect, supremacy and state liability ===
The EFTA Court has consistently held that the provisions of the EEA Agreement are intended for the benefit of individuals and economic operators throughout the European Economic Area and that the proper functioning of the EEA Agreement is dependent on those individuals and economic operators being able to rely on the rights before the national courts of EEA/EFTA States.

- In Case E-1/94 Ravintoloitsijain Liiton Kustannus Oy Restamark the EFTA Court found that it is inherent in Protocol 35 that individuals and economic operators must be entitled to invoke and to claim at the national level any rights that could be derived from the provisions of the EEA Agreement, as being or having been made part of the respective national legal order, if they are unconditional and sufficiently precise.
- In Case E-1/01 Hörður Einarsson v Iceland the EFTA Court held that it follows from the Preamble to, and from the wording of, Protocol 35 that the undertaking assumed under that Protocol relates to EEA rules that have been implemented in national law and that are unconditional and sufficiently precise.
- In the judgment in Case E-4/01 Karl K. Karlsson hf. v Iceland the EFTA Court considered it to be inherent in the general objective of the EEA Agreement of establishing a dynamic and homogeneous market, in the ensuing emphasis on the judicial defence and enforcement of the rights of individuals, as well as in the public international law principle of effectiveness, that national courts will consider any relevant element of EEA law, whether implemented or not, when interpreting national law.
- State liability is, according to settled EFTA Court case law, part of EEA law so that Contracting Parties infringing primary or secondary EEA law and thereby causing damage to individuals or economic operators may be obliged to pay compensation. The EFTA Court ruled that way in its judgment in Case E-9/97 Erla María Sveinbjörnsdóttir v Iceland and confirmed this jurisprudence in 2002 in Karlsson.

=== Legal nature of the EEA Agreement ===
- In its judgment in the Sveinbjörnsdóttir case (vid supra), the EFTA Court characterized the EEA Agreement as an international treaty sui generis which contains a distinct legal order of its own. Its depth of integration is less far-reaching than under the (then) EC Treaty, but its scope and objective goes beyond what is usual for an agreement under public international law. The distinct legal order sui generis established by the EEA Agreement is characterized by the creation of an internal market, the protection of the rights of individuals and economic operators and an institutional framework providing for effective surveillance and judicial review.
- Furthermore, the Court effectively established an obligation to refer preliminary questions under Article 34 of the EEA Agreement. In Case E-18/11 Irish Bank Resolution Corporation Ltd v Kaupþing hf, it noted that the objective of establishing a dynamic and homogeneous European Economic Area can only be achieved if EFTA and EU citizens and economic operators enjoy, relying upon EEA law, the same rights in both the EU and EFTA pillars of the EEA.

=== Fundamental rights ===
- In Case E-8/97 TV 1000, the Court interpreted the transmitting state principle underlying the so-called “TV Without Frontiers” Directive 89/552/EEC and referred to the freedom of expression granted by Article 10 ECHR as well as, with regard to the limitations of that freedom, to the landmark ruling of the European Court of Human Rights in the Handyside case.
- In Case E-2/02 Bellona, the EFTA Court held in the context of an action for nullity against a decision of the EFTA Surveillance Authority ("ESA") approving state aid that access to justice constitutes an essential element of the EEA legal framework which is, however, subject to those conditions and limitations that follow from EEA law. The EFTA Court stated that it was aware of the ongoing debate with regard to the issue of the standing of natural and legal persons in actions against Community institutions and referred, inter alia, to the opinion of Advocate General Jacobs in Case C-50/00 Unión de Pequeños Agricultores. It added that this discussion is important at a time when the significance of the judicial function which is inspired by the idea of human rights appears to be on the increase, both on the national and international level. The Court found nevertheless that caution was warranted, not least in view of the uncertainties inherent in the refashioning of fundamental Community law.
- In Case E-2/03 Ásgeirsson, one of the defendants in the national proceedings had alleged that the reference of the case to the EFTA Court prolonged the duration of the proceedings and thereby infringed Article 6 of the European Convention on Human Rights. The EFTA Court held that provisions of the EEA Agreement as well as procedural provisions of the SCA are to be interpreted in the light of fundamental rights and that the provisions of the European Convention of Human Rights and the judgments of the European Court of Human Rights are important sources for determining the scope of these rights. With regard to the right to a fair and public hearing within a reasonable time granted by Article 6(1) ECHR, the EFTA Court observed that the European Court of Human Rights held in a case concerning a delay of two years and seven months due to a reference by a national court to the European Court of Justice for a preliminary ruling, that this period of time could not be taken into consideration in the assessment of the length of a particular set of proceedings. To take it into account would adversely affect the system instituted by what is now Article 267 TFEU and work against the aim pursued in substance in that Article, as seen in Case Pafitis. The EFTA Court held that the same must apply with regard to the procedure established under Article 34 of the SCA which, as a means of inter-court cooperation, contributes to the proper functioning of the EEA Agreement to the benefit of individuals and economic operators. The EFTA Court added that, the time period from the registration of the request to the delivery of judgment amounted to a little more than five months.
- Recent trends set by the ECJ's case law concerning Article 6 of the European Convention of Human Rights, as seen in Case C-389/10 P KME, Case C-386/10 P Chalkor and the ECtHR Case Menarini, have been also been followed by the EFTA Court in Case E-15/10 Posten Norge AS v EFTA Surveillance Authority (better known as Norway Post). The Court upheld a decision by ESA finding that Norway Post had abused its dominant position in the market for business-to-consumer parcel services with over-the-counter delivery in Norway by pursuing an exclusivity strategy with preferential treatment when establishing and maintaining its Postin-Shop network. The facts of the case were as follows. In 2000 and 2001, Norway Post concluded framework agreements with several undertakings with a view to establish its Post-in-Shop network. Certain agreements specifically excluded competitors in the market for business-to-consumer parcel services from access to any of the outlets in these chains, while others guaranteed Norway Post exclusivity in the outlets which hosted a Post-in-Shop. Due to these exclusivity obligations, once the main roll-out of the Post-in-Shop concept had been implemented towards the end of 2003, Norway Post's competitors were foreclosed from approximately 50% of all outlets belonging to grocery store, kiosk and petrol station chains in Norway. Furthermore, from 2004 to 2006, Norway Post negotiated preference status questions with its partners for the period subsequent to the expiry of those agreements in 2006. While Norway Post did not actively link the negotiations on preference status with the exclusivity obligations, it did not announce to its partners that it would not maintain such clauses in future cooperation agreements. In its judgment, the Court held that the proceedings, which had led to the imposition of a substantial fine on the applicant, as a matter of principle, must respect the guarantees for criminal proceedings enshrined in Article 6 of the European Convention on Human Rights. In particular, the right to a fair trial requires that the Court must be able to quash in all respects, on questions of fact and of law, the challenged decision. Furthermore, it follows from the principle of the presumption of innocence that the undertaking to which the decision finding an infringement was addressed must be given the benefit of the doubt. As a consequence, the Court rejected ESA's submission that its review of complex economic assessments by ESA would be limited to a "manifest error" standard. In substance, the Court upheld ESA's assessment of Norway Post's conduct. The Court dismissed Norway Post's arguments that the exclusivity clauses were objectively necessary for the efficient implementation of the Post-in-Shop concept.

=== Fundamental freedoms ===
- Case E-16/11 Icesave is widely considered to be the landmark case of the EFTA Court case, mainly due to its relation to the 2008 Icelandic financial crisis and Directive 94/19/EC on deposit-guarantee schemes, which had also been transposed into EEA law. This directive obliged EU and EEA EFTA states to create deposit-guarantee schemes. Deposit-guarantee schemes reimburse a limited amount of deposits to depositors where their bank has failed, as a way to protect a part of depositors' wealth from bank failures. In Icesave, the EFTA Court dealt with an action by the EFTA Surveillance Authority against Iceland. The Authority claimed that Iceland had violated the transposed Directive and thus EEA law in the aftermath of its major economic crisis and the collapse of the Icelandic banking sector in 2008, by failing to ensure that British and Dutch depositors using the 'Icesave' accounts offered by Icelandic banks received the minimum amount of compensation set out in Article 7(1) of the Directive. The Court noted that the nature of the result to be achieved fell to be determined by the substantive provisions of the particular directive. Moreover, it noted that as a result of the economic crisis, the regulatory framework of the financial system had been subject to revision and amendment in order to enhance financial stability. But the Court held that the Directive did not envisage the alleged obligation of result to ensure payment to depositors in the Dutch and British branches of Icelandic banks in a systemic crisis of the magnitude experienced in Iceland or how to proceed in a case where the guarantee scheme was unable to cope with its payment obligations remained largely unanswered by the Directive, with its Article 7(6) being the only operative provision that deals with non-payment. Still, the relevant question in Icesave was whether the EEA States are legally responsible under the Directive in an event of such magnitude. The Court held that the principle of non-discrimination requires that there to be no difference in treatment of depositors by the guarantee scheme itself and the way in which it uses its funds. Discrimination under the Directive is prohibited but the transfer of domestic deposits from some entities to new ones was made before the Icelandic Financial Supervisory Authority, Fjármálaeftirlitið, rendered its declaration that triggered the application of the Directive. Thus, depositor protection under the Directive never applied to depositors in Icelandic branches of the affected banks. Accordingly, the transfer of domestic deposits did not fall within the scope of the non-discrimination principle as stipulated by the Directive and could not lead to an infringement of the aforementioned provisions of the Directive read in light of Article 4 EEA.
- In Case E-3/00 Kellogg’s, the EFTA Court had to rule on the compatibility with Article 11 EEA of a ban on the import and marketing in Norway of Kellogg's cornflakes fortified with vitamins and iron which have been lawfully manufactured and marketed in other EEA States. It rejected the argument of the Norwegian government that in order to justify a marketing ban on fortified cornflakes produced in Denmark it was sufficient to show the absence of a nutritional need for the fortification with vitamins and iron in the Norwegian population because of the government had already taken care of the problem by giving out certain fortified products to school children on a regular basis. At the same time, the EFTA Court held that in examining whether the marketing of fortified cornflakes that were produced in Denmark may be banned on grounds of the protection of human health, a national government may, in the absence of harmonization, invoke the precautionary principle. According to that principle, it is sufficient to show that there is relevant scientific uncertainty with regard to the risk in question. The Court stated that measures taken must be based on scientific evidence; they must be proportionate, non-discriminatory, transparent, and consistent with similar measures already taken. The conditions to be fulfilled by a proper application of the precautionary principle were, in the view of the Court, first, an identification of potentially negative health consequences, and secondly, a comprehensive evaluation of the risk to health, which must be based on the most recent scientific information. The EFTA Court added that the precautionary principle can never justify the adoption of arbitrary decisions and can justify the pursuit of the objective of "zero risk" only in the most exceptional circumstances. Since the Norwegian fortification policy did not, at the relevant time, fulfil the requirements of EEA law pertaining to the application of that principle, the Court came to the conclusion that Norway had failed to fulfil its obligations under Article 11 EEA. In particular, the measures taken by Norway were considered inconsistent and not based on a comprehensive risk assessment.
- In Case E-4/04 Pedicel, the Court found that the rules on product coverage of the EEA Agreement mean that its general scope differs from the EU Treaties with regard to agricultural products. In particular, wine does not fall under the EEA provisions on free movement of goods. Further, the Court held that advertisement of wine, closely linked to trade in wine, is not covered by Article 36 EEA on the freedom to provide services, since advertising primarily fulfils the purpose of promoting the sale of wine. The prohibition on advertising of alcoholic beverages also relates to beer and spirits, products generally falling within the scope of the EEA Agreement. The so-called precautionary principle, as defined by the EFTA Court in Kellogg’s, does not apply in a situation where there is uncertainty about the effectiveness of advertising.
- In Case E-1/04 Fokus Bank, the EFTA Court declared the Norwegian imputation tax credit system relating to the taxation of dividends was in breach of Article 40 EEA. Under the Norwegian Corporate Tax Act, dividends paid out by Norwegian companies to shareholders were taxed in the hands of the distributing company and again as general income in the hands of the shareholder. To avoid this so-called economic double taxation, shareholders resident in Norway were granted an imputation tax credit to the effect that dividends were only taxed in the company's hand. However, this credit was not granted to shareholders non-resident in Norway. Instead, they were taxed by way of a withholding tax for which the distributing company was liable. In making this differentiation, the Norwegian legislation was based on the assumption that non-resident shareholders were reimbursed in their respective home state. The Court held that the distribution and receipt of dividends constitutes movement of capital within the meaning of Article 40 EEA. That Contracting Parties are, within the framework of bilateral agreements concluded in order to prevent double taxation, at liberty to determine the connecting factors for the purposes of allocating powers of taxation as between themselves does not mean that in the exercise of the power of taxation so allocated, a Contracting Party may disregard EEA law. The Court found furthermore that Article 40 EEA confers a right upon individuals and economic operators to market access. The Norwegian legislation at issue was held to restrict that right, since differential treatment may have the effect of deterring non-resident shareholders from investing capital in Norwegian companies and of impeding Norwegian companies from raising capital outside Norway. Moreover, the differential treatment constituted discrimination. Possible tax advantages in the home state could not offset the restriction and discrimination resulting from tax legislation in Norway. Attempts of the Norwegian government to justify the violation of Article 40 EEA were rejected. The Court considered shareholders resident and non-resident in Norway to be in an objectively comparable situation, referring to the judgment of the European Court of Justice in Case C-319/02 Manninen. The Court did not accept cohesion of the international tax system as a justification since permitting derogations from the fundamental principle of free movement of capital laid down in Article 40 EEA on the grounds of safeguarding the cohesion of the international tax system would amount to giving bilateral tax agreements preference over EEA law. A Contracting Party cannot therefore make the rights conferred by Article 40 EEA subject to the contents of a bilateral agreement concluded with another Contracting Party.
- In Case E-2/11 STX Norway Offshore AS and Others, the Court delivered an Advisory Opinion on the interpretation of Directive 96/71 on the posting of workers. The Court pointed out that the aforementioned Directive precludes the host EEA State from making the provision of services in its territory conditional on the observance of terms and conditions of employment which go beyond the mandatory rules for minimum protection under the Directive. Further, terms and conditions regarding maximum normal working hours are covered by the Directive's mandatory rules for minimum protection.
- Case E-04/09 Inconsult dealt with the criteria a website had to comply with in order to be considered a "durable medium", according to Article 2(12) of Directive 2002/92/EC on insurance mediation. The Court noted that for the purposes of consumer protection, the Directive sets out certain minimum obligations relating to the information which insurance intermediaries must provide to their customers and the manner in which this is done. By requiring this information to be submitted either on paper or any other durable medium, the Directive facilitates the subsequent verification of the information which an intermediary has provided to his customer. The Court held that a website can constitute a durable medium under Article 2(12) of the Directive, provided that several criteria are met. First, the website must enable the customer to store the information in question. Secondly, the website must enable the customer to store the information in a way which makes it accessible for a period of time adequate to the purposes of the information, that is, for as long as it is relevant for the customer in order to protect his interests stemming from his relations with the insurance intermediary. This might cover the time during which contractual negotiations were conducted even if not resulting in the conclusion of an insurance contract, the period during which an insurance contract is in force and, to the extent necessary e.g. for seeking redress, the period after such a contract has lapsed. Thirdly, the website must allow for the unchanged reproduction of information stored. In this respect, the Court held that the information must be stored in a way that makes it impossible for the insurance intermediary to change it unilaterally. It is for the insurance intermediary to ensure that the methods of electronic communication he employs permit this kind of reproduction. Finally, the Court held that for a website to qualify as a durable medium it is irrelevant whether the customer has expressly consented to the provision of information through the internet.

=== Competition law. The Interplay between Competition and Collective Agreements ===
- In Case E-8/00 Landsorganisasjonen (commonly referred to as 'LO') the EFTA Court had to provide an Advisory Opinion. The issue before the national court was whether a number of Norwegian municipalities had breached certain provisions of the Basic Collective Agreement for Municipalities when they transferred their occupational pension insurance scheme from one supplier, KLP, a private mutual life insurance company wholly owned by members of the Norwegian Association of Local and Regional Authorities, to other insurance companies. The municipalities submitted that several provisions in the Basic Collective Agreement were void because they infringed Articles 53 and 54 EEA, the provisions mirroring Articles 81 and 82 EC. The contested provisions stated, inter alia, that in the event of a change of the pension company, this should be discussed with union representatives; that before the decision-making body might begin to deal with a possible change of company relevant offers for a new occupational pension scheme should be put before those members of the pension committee who represent the parties to the collective agreement; that the occupational pension scheme had to be based on a financing system that is gender-neutral and does not have the effect of excluding older employees; that before the matter might be decided upon by the municipality there had to be approval from the Norwegian Public Service Pension Fund; and that the pension scheme had to be taken note of by the Banking, Insurance and Securities Commission. The EFTA Court found that the relationship between the national law of collective bargaining and the EEA competition rules must be assessed by applying the test established by the ECJ in Case C-67/96 Albany and in related cases. It concluded that on that basis, the contested provisions would prima facie fall outside the scope of Article 53 EEA. If, however, the national court found that the contested provisions do not pursue their purported objectives, the provisions, in light of the objectives actually pursued, fall within the scope of Article 53 EEA. If so, and if the national court found that these provisions in effect required the municipalities to obtain supplementary pension insurance services from specific insurers, thus excluding, or severely limiting, their possibility of selecting other qualified service providers, these provisions were also held capable of constituting a restriction of competition within the meaning of Article 53 EEA. The Court held that, in any case, the good faith of the parties in concluding and implementing a collective agreement must also be taken into account. When examining the several elements of a collective agreement, the national court must consider their aggregate effect. Whether an agreement restricts competition, and thereby infringes Article 53 EEA, is a legal question that must be examined in light of economic considerations. The EFTA Court found furthermore that Article 54 EEA may apply if the national court were to find that the supplier of the occupational pension scheme, KLP, enjoyed a dominant position in the relevant market, that an identification might be made between the Norwegian Association of Local and Regional Authorities and the supplier, and that their conduct in relation to the conclusion or the implementation of the contested provisions of the Basic Collective Agreement had in practice prevented transfers of supplementary pension insurance schemes from KLP to other insurance companies, in order to protect the position of KLP.
- The guiding principles set out in LO were confirmed in Case E-14/15 Holship Norge but with some additional points specific to the case. The Court held that the exemption of collective agreements from EEA competition rules does not cover a clause whereby a port user is obliged to give priority to another company's workers over its own employees, or the use of a boycott in order to procure acceptance of the collective agreement containing that clause. The Court held that a collective agreement falls outside the scope of the EEA competition rules if it has been entered into following collective bargaining between employers and employees, and if it pursues the objective of improving conditions of work and employment. In Holship Norge, although the first requirement was fulfilled, the second was not. Further, the Court also referred to the application of Articles 53 and 54 of the EEA Agreement.

=== Transfer of undertakings ===
- In Case E-2/96 Ulstein, a company that had provided ambulance services for a hospital was no longer considered following a public call for tenders, but was replaced by a second company. No tangible assets were taken over by the second service provider. The office in the hospital building that had been used by the first service provider was no longer available. The second company reemployed four of the first company's nineteen employees. The other employees, including the two plaintiffs, were not offered employment. The EFTA Court ruled that a mere succession of two contracts for the provision of the same or similar services will not, as a rule, be sufficient for there to be a transfer of an undertaking, business, or part of a business within the meaning of the Transfer of Undertakings Directive 77/187/EEC.

=== Trademark rights ===
- In Case E-3/02 Paranova v. Merck, concerning the repackaging of pharmaceuticals, the Court departed from the ECJ's previous criterion, that of making the right to repackage dependent on the so-called criterion of necessity, according to which, the repackaging is permitted only insofar as necessary to surmount obstacles to the free movement of goods. However, the issue in Paranova v. Merck concerned packaging design, which had not previously been addressed before the ECJ. The EFTA Court emphasized the importance of free trade in markets partitioned along national boundaries, such as the pharmaceutical market, where certain privileges are conferred on parallel importers. Once the right to repackage and to reaffix the original trade mark is established and market access is thereby ensured, the parallel importer is to be considered as an operator with basically the same rights as the manufacturer and the trade mark proprietor within the framework of the Trade Mark Directive. Thus, its strategy of product presentation and the new design cannot be subject to the necessity criterion. Therefore, the Court concluded, a comprehensive investigation leading to a careful balancing of the interests of the trade mark proprietor and the parallel importer must be undertaken.
- In Case E-2/97 Mag Instruments a parallel importer purchased Maglite flashlights in California, where they were manufactured, and imported them into Norway without the manufacturer's and trade mark owner's consent. According to established Norwegian law, international exhaustion applied to trade marks. The EFTA Court held that under the First Trade Mark Directive 89/104/EEC, the EFTA States were entitled to opt for the international exhaustion of trade mark rights. The Court emphasized that they retained their sovereignty in foreign trade matters. Unlike the EC Treaty, the EEA Agreement did not establish a customs union, but an enhanced free trade area. The purpose and the scope of the EC Treaty and the EEA Agreement are therefore different. According to Article 8 EEA, the principle of free movement of goods as laid down in Articles 11 to 13 EEA applies only to goods originating in the EEA, while in the Community a product is in free circulation once it has been lawfully placed on the market in a Member State. In general, the latter applies in the context of the EEA only with respect to products originating in the EEA. In the case at hand, the product was manufactured in the United States and imported into Norway. Accordingly, it was not subject to the principle of the free movement of goods within the EEA. Based on this, the EFTA Court rejected the argument put forward by the governments of France, Germany, and the United Kingdom as well as by the European Commission that giving the EEA/EFTA States the right to opt for international exhaustion would lead to disparities in the EEA market. Article 7(1) of the Trade Mark Directive was interpreted so that it was for the EEA/EFTA States' legislatures and courts to decide whether they wanted to introduce or to maintain the principle of international exhaustion of trade mark rights with regard to goods originating from outside the EEA. The EFTA Court found that international exhaustion was in the interest of free trade and competition and thus in the interest of consumers. Furthermore, the principle of international exhaustion was in line with the main function of a trade mark, to allow the consumer to identify with certainty the origin of the products. This interpretation of Article 7(1) of the Trade Mark Directive was also consistent with the TRIPs Agreement, which left the issue open for the Member States to regulate.

=== Other notable cases ===
- In Case 14/11 DB Schenker I, the Court held that, the objective of establishing a dynamic and homogeneous European Economic Area can only be achieved if EFTA and EU citizens and economic operators enjoy, relying upon EEA law, the same rights in both the EU and EFTA pillars of the EEA. As regards the substance of the case, the Court found that a homogeneous interpretation of the Rules on Access to Documents adopted by ESA and of Regulation 1049/2001 was indispensable. Recital 7 RAD provided that ESA will, in the application of the RAD, strive to achieve a homogeneous interpretation with that of the Union courts and the European Ombudsman so as to ensure at least the same degree of openness as provided for by Regulation 1049/2001. The Court concluded that it was evident that ESA itself aimed to ensure procedural homogeneity by adopting the RAD. In fact, it was required to do so for reasons of reciprocity.
- In Joined Cases E-3/13 and E-20/13 Fred Olsen, concerning the application of Norwegian CFC rules to the members of a family for whose benefit a trust had been established in Liechtenstein as a holding entity for shares in several companies, the Court held, first, that the right of establishment, provided for in Articles 31 to 34 EEA, is granted both to natural persons who are nationals of an EEA State and to legal entities ("companies or firms"), no matter whether they have legal personality or not, provided they have been formed in accordance with the law of an EU State or an EFTA State and have their registered office, central administration or principal place of business within the territory of the Contracting Parties. Secondly, the Court also recognised that the prevention of tax avoidance may provide a justification, but only where the measures taken target wholly artificial arrangements which do not reflect economic reality. The assessment of the facts in that respect was a matter for the national court. Accordingly, such a tax measure must not be applied where it is proven, on the basis of objective factors which are ascertainable by third parties, that despite the existence of tax motives a CFC is actually established in the host EEA State and carries on genuine economic activities, which take effect (sc. somewhere) in the EEA.
- In Case E-8/13, Abelia, the Court dismissed an action brought by Abelia, a trade and employers association that is part of Næringslivets Hovedorganisasjon ("NHO"), the Confederation of Norwegian Enterprise. The applicant sought the annulment of ESA Decision No 160/13/COL of 24 April 2013 where ESA concluded, without initiating the formal investigation procedure, that the contested provisions of the Norwegian VAT Act and VAT Compensation Act did not have the effect of granting State aid, within the meaning of Article 61(1) EEA, to public schools or the lessors of premises to public schools. Besides the applicant's legal interest in bringing the action for annulment, which led to the dismissal, the Court had to deal with the situation of the applicant's counsel in light of Article 17(2) of the Statute of the Court, according to which parties other than any EFTA State, ESA, the European Union and the Commission must be represented by a lawyer. The Court examined the relationship between the applicant and the two lawyers that signed the application. The independence of one lawyer was not found to be affected by her position as head of the Business Legislation Department of NHO as the Court had not been provided with information demonstrating that the interests of NHO were largely the same as those of the applicant. The other lawyer was also deemed sufficiently independent from the applicant as an employee of an independent law firm, from where she continued to receive her salary, regardless of a contract between NHO and the law firm for the temporary provision of her services. The applicant was thus found to be properly represented before the Court, showing that the right of audience of in-house counsel must be assessed on a case-by-case basis.
- Case E-26/13 Gunnarsson concerned two Icelandic nationals residing in Denmark. Mr Gunnarsson and his wife were in Denmark from 24 January 2004 to 3 September 2009. During this period, their total income consisted of his wife's unemployment benefit (that she was in receipt of in Iceland up until 1 May 2004) and his disability pension from the Icelandic Social Insurance Administration, together with benefit payments he received from two Icelandic pension funds. He paid income tax in Iceland on his income but was precluded from including, for tax purposes, his wife's personal tax credit while they were Danish residents. This was because under the applicable Icelandic tax provisions, they had to reside in Iceland in order to pool their personal tax credits. Mr Gunnarsson brought an action against the Icelandic State, seeking repayment of the alleged overcharge. The Court held that Article 1(1) of Directive 90/365 and Article 7(1)(b) of Directive 2004/38 must be interpreted such that they confer on a pensioner who receives a pension due to a former employment relationship, but who has not carried out any economic activity in another EEA State during his working life, not only a right of residence in relation to the host EEA State, but also a right to move freely from the home EEA State. The latter right prohibits the home State from hindering such a person from moving to another EEA State. A less favourable treatment of persons exercising the right to move than those who remain resident amounts to such a hindrance. Furthermore, a spouse of such a pensioner has similar derived rights, cf. Article 1(2) of Directive 90/365 and Article 7(1)(d) of Directive 2004/38, respectively.
- E-18/14, Wow Air, is a request to the Court under Article 34 SCA from Reykjavík District Court concerning the interpretation of Council Regulation (EEC) No 95/93 on common rules for the allocation of slots at Community airports. The President decided to apply an accelerated procedure according to Article 97a(1) of the Rules of Procedure, on the basis that a ruling on the questions referred is a matter of exceptional urgency, in particular because of the economic sensitivity of the case and in light of the potential effects slot allocations in the near future. In the case at hand, Iceland's special geographic situation was also taken into account with Keflavík essentially being the only international airport in the country. This is the first case in which an accelerated procedure derogating from the provisions of the Rules of Procedure to a reference for an advisory opinion has been applied.
- In Case E-5/15, Matja Kumba, the national court asked, firstly, whether an average weekly working time of 84 hours (7–7 rotation) in a cohabitant care arrangement constitutes a breach of Article 6 of the Working Time Directive (Directive 2003/88/EC); secondly, whether a national provision, under which an employee's consent to working more than 60 hours per week in a cohabitant care arrangement cannot be revoked, is compatible with the rights that employees have under the Directive; and thirdly, whether a dismissal following a failure to consent to a working time arrangement of more than 48 hours over a seven-day period constitutes a "detriment" within the meaning of the Directive. With regard to the first question, the Court noted that it is for the national court to assess the amount of working time in the case at hand, taking into account the factors clarified by the Court. Working time amounting to an average of 84 hours per week in a cohabitant care arrangement is compatible with Article 6 of the Directive, in circumstances governed by Article 22(1)(a), provided that the worker has explicitly, freely and individually agreed to perform such work, and the general principles of the protection of the safety and health of the worker are observed. With regard to the second question, the Court noted that the Directive does not contain a provision concerning revocation of consent. It is for national law to determine whether such revocation of consent is possible. However, a complete inability to revoke consent, even in exceptional and unforeseen circumstances, may prove incompatible with the Directive, since the possibility for a worker to consent to exceeding the maximum weekly working time is expressly conditional on the EEA State respecting the general principles of the protection of the health and safety of workers, cf. Article 22(1)(a) of the Directive. With regard to the third question, the Court noted that, typically, a dismissal due to a failure to consent to a working time arrangement of more than 48 hours over a seven-day period constitutes a "detriment". However, a notice of dismissal and offer of re-engagement on new terms, following a refusal by a worker to agree to a working time arrangement of more than 48 hours over a seven-day period, is not to be considered a "detriment" if the termination of the employment is based upon reasons that are fully independent of the worker's refusal to agree to perform such additional work.
- In Cases E-15/15 and 16/15, Vienna Life and Swiss Life, the Court ruled on the interpretation of Directive 2002/83/EC concerning life assurance. It held that Article 36(1) of the Directive does not address legal transactions according to which an existing unit-linked life assurance policy is transferred via a purchase agreement from one person to another where the insured risk, namely the insured person, under the assurance policy remains the same. Furthermore, a transfer of a unit-linked life assurance policy does not constitute a change in the policy conditions under Article 36(2) unless the terms of an assurance policy are also amended, thereby altering the balance of rights and obligations of the parties to an assurance contract. With regard to the referring court's further questions on specific information duties under the Directive, the Court found, first, that if a "change in the policy conditions" within the meaning of the Directive has taken place, the referring court needs to consider whether the information listed in Annex III(B)(b)(2) was provided to the second-hand policy holder in a clear, accurate and complete manner and in an official language of the EEA State of commitment. Second, it is of no significance for the information obligation of the assurance undertaking whether the former policy holder was an undertaking and the new policy holder is a consumer, unless this difference has led to an amendment to the terms of the assurance contract. Neither is it of significance whether or not the original policy holder disclosed information about himself so that his own risk or investor profile could be assessed. As to the referring court's question whether Annex III to the Directive has been correctly transposed into Liechtenstein law, the Court held that directives must be implemented into the national legal order of the EEA States with unquestionable binding force and the specificity, precision and clarity necessary to satisfy the requirements of legal certainty. Furthermore, national courts are bound to interpret national law in conformity with EEA law. Under Article 34 SCA, the Court has jurisdiction to give advisory opinions on the interpretation of the EEA Agreement upon the request of national courts. After the Court has rendered its judgment, it falls to the referring court to interpret national law in light of the Court's findings. In cases where a harmonious interpretation of national law is not sufficient to achieve the result sought by the relevant EEA rule, that matter can be brought before the Court under the procedure prescribed by Article 31 SCA.
- In Case E-29/15, Sorpa, the Court answered questions referred to it by the Supreme Court of Iceland on the interpretation of Article 54 EEA. In 1988, the municipalities in the metropolitan area of Reykjavík entered into an agreement whereby Sorpa bs. was established as a municipal cooperative agency and was entrusted with waste management tasks. By a decision of 21 December 2012 the Icelandic Competition Authority found that Sorpa had infringed Article 11 of the Icelandic Competition Act pertaining to the abuse of a dominant position. It found that Sorpa enjoyed a dominant position on the market for waste acceptance in the metropolitan area of Reykjavík, where its market share amounted to approximately 70% and it faced competition from only one operator, Gámaþjónustan hf. Moreover, Sorpa enjoyed a dominant position on the market for waste disposal in the same geographic area, where it was the sole operator. The Court held that an entity of public law constitutes an undertaking within the meaning of Article 54 EEA when it does not act in the exercise of official authority but engages in an economic activity, which consists in offering goods or services on a market. In order to determine whether the provision of waste management services by a municipality or a municipal cooperative agency such as Sorpa is an economic activity, account must be taken of the existence of competition with private entities and the level of the compensation received. In that regard, the Court noted that under the Waste Disposal Act, licences for the operation of waste disposal centres and landfill sites may be granted to private entities, and one licence was granted to Gámaþjónustan, a private entity. The fact that Sorpa decided to charge a fee for the provision of waste acceptance services, although it was not obliged to do so, is a further indication of the economic nature of its activity.
