= Pauliine Koskelo =

Finnish Supreme Court judge

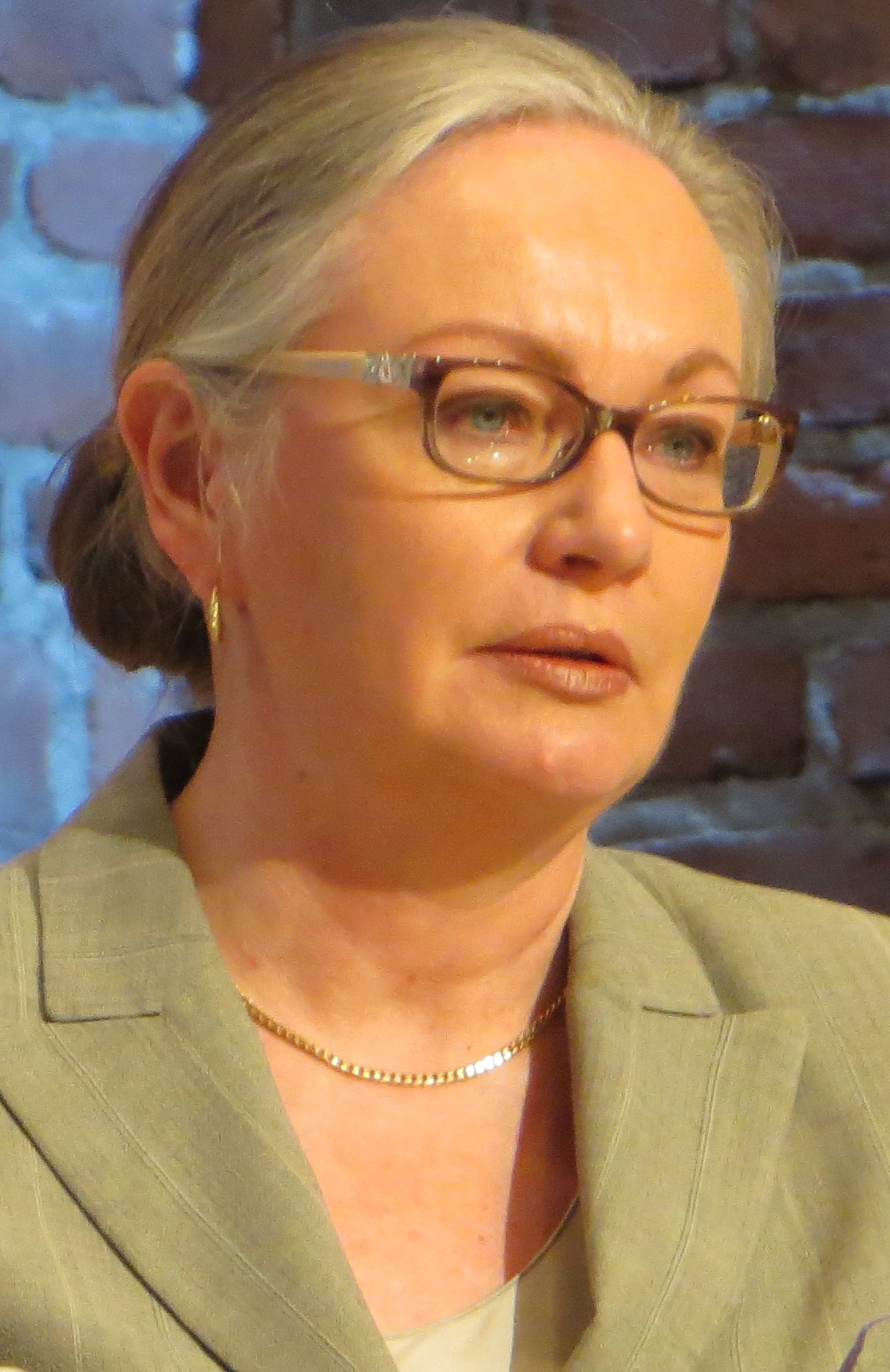
Pauliine Koskelo in 2015

Pauliine Koskelo (née Järvelä, born 22 June 1956) was appointed President of the Supreme Court of Finland in 2005. On 21 April 2015 she was elected as a judge to the European Court of Human Rights by the Parliamentary Assembly of the Council of Europe.

== Education ==
Koskelo is a graduate of the University of Helsinki Law Faculty, and Dr. iur. h.c. of that university.

== Early career ==
Koskelo served at the Ministry of Justice in various areas of legislative work and international co-operation, including questions of European Union law. Between 1999 and 2015, she worked in senior positions at the legal directorate of the European Investment Bank (EIB) in Luxembourg, dealing with institutional and other EU law matters.

== Other activities ==
- Network of Presidents of the Supreme Judicial Courts of the EU Member States, Vice-President
- European Academy of Law (ERA), President of the Board of Trustees

== Publications ==
- Avioerot ja niihin vaikuttaneet tekijät 1930–1977 (gradu, 1979)
- Avoliitto vai avioliitto? (1984), together with Sami Mahkonen, ISBN 951-640-227-5
- Kauppalain pääkohdat (1987), together with Leif Sevón and Thomas Wilhelmsson, ISBN 951-640-348-4
- Uudet velkalait perinnässä (1993), together with Yrjö Lehtonen, ISBN 951-885-092-5
- Yksityishenkilön velkajärjestely (1993), together with Liisa Lehtimäki, ISBN 951-640-633-5
- Yrityssaneeraus (1994), ISBN 951-640-634-3
- Henkilökohtainen velkavastuu ja insolvenssimenettely (2004), ISBN 952-466-039-3

== See also ==
- Academy of European Law
