= Henrik Bull (judge) =

Norwegian judge

Henrik Bull (born 1957) is a Norwegian judge.

He was born in Oslo, graduated with the cand.jur. degree in 1984 and took the dr.juris degree in 2002. He also took an undergraduate degree in Russian language in 1978.

He was a consultant in the Ministry of Justice and the Police from 1985 to 1987, then deputy judge in Nedre Romerike District Court for one year. He was then a legislative adviser in the Ministry of Justice and the Police from 1988 to 1996, when he was hired as a research fellow at the University of Oslo Centre for European Law. From 2002 to 2005 he headed the Centre for European Law. After a period as a judge in the EFTA Court from 2006 to 2010, he became a Supreme Court Justice in January 2011.
