= Lauge =

Lauge is a Danish male given name and surname.

Notable people with the given name include:

- Lauge Beck (c. 1530–1607), Danish judge and royal treasurer
- Lauge Koch (1892–1964), Danish geologist and Arctic explorer
- Lauge Sandgrav (born 2004), Danish footballer

Notable people with the surname include:

- Michelle Lauge Quaade (born 1991), Danish road cyclist
- Rasmus Lauge Schmidt (born 1991), Danish handball player

== See also ==
- Laug
