= Vilhjálmsdóttir =

Vilhjálmsdóttir is an Icelandic patronymic, meaning daughter of Vilhjálmur. In Icelandic names, the name is not strictly a surname as it is not a family name, but a patronymic. Notable people with this name include:

- Linda Vilhjálmsdóttir (b. 1958), Icelandic poet and playwright
- Margrét Vilhjálmsdóttir (b. 1966), Icelandic stage, film, and television actress
- Unnur Birna Vilhjálmsdóttir (b. 1984), Icelandic beauty queen; Miss World 2005

== See also ==
- Vilhjálmsson
