= Haug, Minnesota =

Haug
- Unincorporated community
- Location within Minnesota Location within the United States
- Coordinates: 48°49′11″N 96°11′04″W
- Country: United States
- State: Minnesota
- County: Roseau
- Elevation: 1,033 ft (315 m)
- Time zone: UTC-6 (Central (CST))
  - Summer (DST): UTC-5 (CDT)
- Area code: 218
- GNIS feature ID: 654746

Haug is an unincorporated community in Roseau County, in the U.S. state of Minnesota.

== History ==
A post office called Haug was established in 1897, and remained in operation until 1931. The community was named for Theodore E. Haug, a Norwegian settler.
