= Coatdress =

Women's dress resembling an overcoat

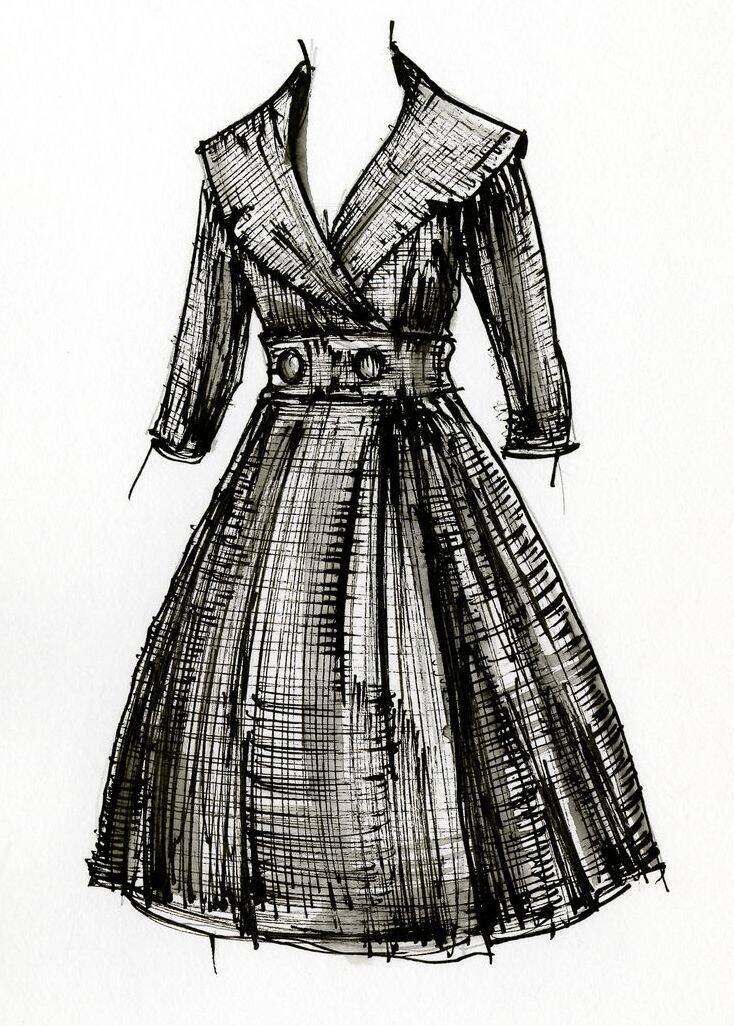
Coatdress

A coatdress or coat dress is a woman's dress that resembles an overcoat, usually with collar, lapels and front fastenings similar to a coat, and made in spring- or autumn-weight fabrics. The modern coatdress first emerged in the 1910s, with a 1915 article in Vogue assuring readers that the new garment could be worn over waistcoats or underdresses. The basic coatdress was a wardrobe staple for most decades, but became particularly popular in the 1960s. In the 1980s and 1990s, Diana, Princess of Wales, was a particularly high-profile wearer of coatdresses, many designed by Catherine Walker. The coatdress is often recommended for those wishing to project a professional look, whether in the office, or in the courtroom.

== See also ==
- Pelisse
- Redingote
