= Norwegian Medical Association =

Medical association and trade union in Norway

The Norwegian Medical Association (NMA; Norwegian: Den norske legeforening), founded in 1886 as Den norske lægeforening, is a Norwegian medical association and trade union for physicians and medical students. Based in Oslo, it is the main organization for doctors in Norway and is affiliated with Akademikerne. The association says that about 95 percent of physicians in Norway are members.

== History ==
The association was founded in 1886. A historical overview in Michael states that it emerged partly in reaction to the more academic and less practice-oriented profile of the Norwegian Medical Society, and that doctors' working conditions became one of its main fields of activity alongside professional matters. The association later adopted the modern spelling Den norske legeforening in place of the historic form Den norske lægeforening.

The association's journal predates the organization itself. Tidsskrift for praktisk Medicin was established in 1881, the association assumed publishing responsibility from the eighth volume in 1888, and the publication was renamed Tidsskrift for Den norske lægeforening in 1890.

== Role and organization ==
According to the association, its main aims are to safeguard members' professional, social and financial interests, promote high professional and ethical standards, and take part in the development of the Norwegian health-care system. Store norske leksikon notes that the Norwegian state delegated responsibility for approving medical specialists to the association, giving it an important role in specialist and continuing medical education. Members are registered by occupation and geography, while approved specialists are also grouped in subject-based medical societies.

In 2025 the association reported just over 42,000 members, including physicians and medical students. Its structure includes county divisions, occupational branches, medical societies, specialty branches and the Norwegian Association of Medical Students. The association also maintains a Medical Ethics Council and local ethics committees. According to the association, these bodies review ethical questions and can reprimand members or recommend exclusion from the association in cases involving breaches of the association's code of ethics.

Internationally, the association says that it takes part in bodies including the World Medical Association, the Standing Committee of European Doctors and the European Union of Medical Specialists.

== Publications and research ==
The association publishes Tidsskrift for Den norske legeforening (Journal of the Norwegian Medical Association), an open-access medical journal. The National Library of Medicine records the journal as indexed in MEDLINE and PubMed from 1965, while the journal website states that it is also indexed in Google Scholar, Crossref, ESCI and DOAJ.

The association is also linked to the Institute for Studies of the Medical Profession (LEFO), which began in 1992 as a large survey of Norwegian physicians' health, working conditions and living conditions.
