= Texas International Law Journal =

- Discipline: Law, Comparative law, International law
- Language: English
- Edited by: William Hinson

Publication details
- Former names: Journal of the University of Texas International Law Society (1965), Texas International Law Forum (1965-1971)
- History: 1965-present
- Publisher: UT Law Publications (United States)

Standard abbreviations
- Bluebook: Tex. Int'l L.J.
- ISO 4: Tex. Int. Law J.

Indexing
- ISSN: 0163-7479
- OCLC no.: 1767354
- ISSN: 0040-4381
- ISSN: 0749-3460

Links
- Journal homepage

The Texas International Law Journal (abbreviated as TILJ) is a student-edited law journal at the University of Texas School of Law.

== History and overview ==
The journal was created in the wake of the Bay of Pigs Invasion and the Cuban Missile Crisis with the encouragement and support of E. Ernest Goldstein. It published its first issue in January 1965 and has been in continuous publication since. It has attracted noted authors, including former Supreme Court of the United States Justice William O. Douglas. Over the years, it has been cited by courts at all levels, including the Texas Supreme Court.

Additionally, the journal organizes a symposium every year, with speakers from the United States and around the world. Recent titles include: A Conference on the Military Commissions Act, Representing Culture, Translating Human Rights, Judicialization and Globalization of the Judiciary, Symposium on International Litigation Honoring Russell J. Weintraub, International Symposium in Honor of Hans Baade: Teaching and Practicing Law in the 21st Century, Energy and International Law: Development, Litigation, and Regulation, Human Reproduction and International Law, and International Bankruptcy Law: Comparative and Transnational Approaches.
