= Thór Vilhjálmsson (jurist) =

3rd President of the European Free Trade Association Court
- In office 2000–2002
- Preceded by: Bjørn Haug
- Succeeded by: Carl Baudenbacher

Personal details
- Born: 9 June 1930 Reykjavík, Iceland
- Died: 20 October 2015 (aged 85) Reykjavík, Iceland
- Education: St. Andrews University; University of Iceland; New York University; University of Copenhagen
- Occupation: Lawyer, jurist, professor

Thór Vilhjálmsson (1930–2015) was an Icelandic jurist who served as judge and president of the European Free Trade Association Court. Prior to his tenure on the EFTA Court, he served as a judge of the European Court of Human Rights, as an associate justice of the Supreme Court of Iceland, and as president of the Association of Icelandic Lawyers.

Legal offices
Preceded by Bjørn Haug	President of the European Free Trade Association Court; 2000–2002	Succeeded by Carl Baudenbacher
