= Hjalmar Nygaard =

Hjalmar Nygaard may refer to:

- Hjalmar Carl Nygaard (1906–1963), U.S. Representative from North Dakota
- Hjalmar Nygaard (boxer) (1900–1936), Norwegian boxer
