= Journal of the Norwegian Medical Association =

Norwegian medical journal

Tidsskrift for den Norske Legeforening
- Discipline: Medicine
- Language: Norwegian, with some articles available online translated into English
- Edited by: Are Brean

Publication details
- Former name(s): Tidsskrift for praktisk Medicin, Organ for Den norske lægeforening
- History: 1881–present
- Publisher: Norwegian Medical Association (Den norske lægeforening) (Norway)
- Frequency: Biweekly

Standard abbreviations
- ISO 4: Tidsskr. Nor. Legeforen.

Indexing
- ISSN: 0029-2001 (print); 0807-7096 (web)
- OCLC no.: 60625699

Links
- Journal homepage; Online access

The Journal of the Norwegian Medical Association (Norwegian: Tidsskrift for Den norske legeforening) is a biweekly peer-reviewed medical journal published by the Norwegian Medical Association and established in 1881. It includes research and review articles, news stories, and debates about professional issues and education, as well as discussion of medical education. The journal has been indexed by Index Medicus, MEDLINE, and PubMed since 1965.

It was established in 1881 under the title Tidsskrift for praktisk Medicin (Journal of Practical Medicine, in the sense of clinical medicine). The journal was established five years before the Norwegian Medical Association (Norwegian: Den norske lægeforening, from 2008 Den norske legeforening). The journal changed names in 1888 to Organ for Den norske lægeforening (Proceedings of the Norwegian Medical Association) before being renamed Tidsskrift for Den norske lægeforening (Journal of the Norwegian Medical Association) in 1890. The spelling was changed to Tidsskrift for Den norske legeforening to reflect modern Norwegian orthography in 2008. It is nicknamed and to some extent branded simply as "Tidsskriftet" (The Journal) within the Norwegian medical profession.

Besides the medical articles, the main content of the journal are news and debate articles.

The journal accepts advertising for prescription drugs that cannot be legally advertised to the general public. It also includes advertisements for specialist practices and private hospitals. The editor-in-chief from 2002 to 2015 was Charlotte Haug, and since then Are Brean.
