= Marius Nygaard (academic) =

Norwegian linguist

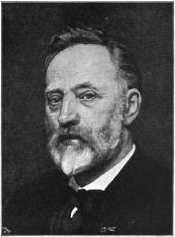
Marius Nygaard (1902) by Eyolf Soot

Marius Nygaard (13 September 1838 – 7 February 1912) was a Norwegian educator and linguist.

== Personal life ==
He was born in Bergen as a son of shipmaster and merchant Mads Christensen Nygaard (1793–1875) and Maren Behrens (1806–1875). On the maternal side he was a first cousin of Johan Diederich Behrens.

Nygaard married Elise Martin (1842–1923) in August 1863 in Bergen. They had the son William Martin Nygaard, a notable politician and book publisher. Marius Nygaard was also a grandfather of Mads Wiel Nygaard and judge Marius Nygaard, and a great-grandfather of Agnes Nygaard Haug, Kristen Nygaard and William Nygaard.

== Career ==
He finished his secondary education in 1855 and graduated from the Royal Frederick University with the cand.philol. degree in 1861. He worked at Bergen Cathedral School from 1862 to 1863 and Christianssand Cathedral School 1864 to 1876, and was headmaster from 1876 to 1877. He was the headmaster of the upper secondary school in Fredrikshald from 1877 to 1894 and Drammen from 1894 to 1910. He was a member of the city councils of both Christianssand, Fredrikshald and Drammen.

He conducted linguistic research. Publications include Eddasprogets Syntax, in two volumes in 1865 and 1867, about the syntax in Edda, as well as Betydningen og Brugen af Verbet in 1878. He was a member of Royal Norwegian Society of Sciences and Letters from 1877 and the Norwegian Academy of Science and Letters from 1880. In 1887 he published the Latin-Norwegian dictionary Latinsk Ordbog together with Jan Johanssen and Emil Schreiner, a book which is still in use—it has been updated and reissued, last in 1998.

He published Kortfattet Fremstilling af det norske Landsmaals Grammatik in 1867, a very early grammar of Landsmål. He was a proponent of this written form of Norwegian, among others as a member of Vestmannalaget. Together with Jonathan Aars he was also a driving force behind the Norwegian orthographic reform of 1907, which marked a split between Dano-Norwegian and the new Riksmål.

He was decorated with the Royal Norwegian Order of St. Olav in 1890, and died in February 1912 in Kristiania.
