= Gunnar Nygaard =

Gunnar Nygaard may refer to:

- Gunnar Nygaard (broadcaster) (1897–1997), Norwegian radio broadcaster
- Gunnar Nygaard (phycologist) (1903–2002), Danish phycologist
