= Nygårds hagar =

- Location within Stockholm Location within Sweden
- Coordinates: 59°13′N 17°17′E
- Country: Sweden
- Province: Södermanland
- County: Stockholm County
- Municipality: Nykvarn Municipality

Area
  - Total: 0.39 km^{2} (0.15 sq mi)

Population (31 December 2010)
  - Total: 328
  - Density: 850/km^{2} (2,200/sq mi)
- Time zone: UTC+1 (CET)
  - Summer (DST): UTC+2 (CEST)

Nygårds hagar (or Nygård) is a locality situated in Nykvarn Municipality, Stockholm County, Sweden with 328 inhabitants in 2010.
