= Marius Nygaard Haug =

Norwegian jurist

Marius Nygaard Haug (born 1960) is a Norwegian jurist. Among others he has had a leading position in the Norges Bank Investment Management.

He is a son of Bjørn Haug and Agnes Nygaard Haug, and a grandson of Supreme Court Justice Marius Nygaard. He graduated from the University of Oslo with the cand.jur. degree in 1988.

He was working for the Norwegian Ministry of Finance when he in late 1992 was hired in the European Free Trade Association Surveillance Authority. In 1994 he returned to Norway as the newly appointed chief jurist in the Financial Supervisory Authority of Norway. In late 1997 he was hired as a legal manager in the Norges Bank Investment Management, which is responsible for managing the Government Pension Fund – Global upon which Norway's wealth builds, on a one-year contract. Yngve Slyngstad was hired in the management at the same time. Haug later headed the compliance department of Norges Bank Investment Management, with Slyngstad being director from 2008.

Haug has been a member of the social clubs Det Norske Selskab and Norsk Anchorite Klubb.
