= Agnes Nygaard Haug =

Norwegian judge (born 1933)

Supreme Court Justice
- In office 1994–1995

Agnes Margrete Nygaard Haug (born 27 August 1933) is a Norwegian judge.

She was born in Oslo as a daughter of Supreme Court Justice Marius Nygaard (1902–1978) and Eva Julie Johanne Christensen (1906–2000). Her great-grandfather was the academic Marius Nygaard, and she is also a grandniece of William Martin Nygaard and a second cousin of William Nygaard and Kristen Nygaard. In January 1956 she married judge Bjørn Haug (born 1928). They have the son Marius Nygaard Haug, a notable jurist.

She was employed in the Ministry of Justice and the Police from 1959 to 1977, being promoted to sub-director in 1973. She was then appointed as a presiding judge in Eidsivating, serving one final year as presiding judge in Borgarting when that court was created in 1995. From 1994 to 1995 she was an acting Supreme Court Justice. She retired in 1996.
