= Bjørn Haug =

Norwegian jurist (1928–2020)

2nd President of the European Free Trade Association Court
- In office 1995–1999
- Preceded by: Leif Sevón
- Succeeded by: Thór Vilhjálmsson

Personal details
- Born: 16 December 1928 Oslo, Norway
- Died: 8 April 2020 (aged 91)

Bjørn Haug (16 December 1928 – 8 April 2020) was a Norwegian jurist who held a number of appointed and elected positions.

== Biography ==
He was born in Oslo. He worked in the Office of the Attorney General of Norway from 1959 to 1962 and in the private company Christiania Spigerverk from 1962 to 1972. He was then the Attorney General of Norway from 1972 to 1993, and also served as the State Conciliator of Norway, from January 1982 to January 1988. He was appointed to the European Free Trade Association Court in 1994, and served as its President from 1995 to 1999.

From 1975 to 1981 he chaired the board of directors of the Norwegian National Opera. He has also been the auditor of the Norwegian Nobel Committee.

In January 1956 he married judge Agnes Nygaard (born 1933). He was a son-in-law of Supreme Court Justice Marius Nygaard. He is the father of jurist Marius Nygaard Haug. Bjørn Haug became 91 years old. He died on 8 April 2020.

Legal offices
Preceded by Hans Methlie Michelsen	Attorney General of Norway; 1972–1993	Succeeded by Sven Ole Fagernæs
Preceded by Konrad B. Knutsen	State Conciliator of Norway; 1982–1988	Succeeded by Reidar Webster
Preceded by Leif Sevón	President of the European Free Trade Association Court; 1995–1999	Succeeded by Thór Vilhjálmsson
