= William Nygaard =

Norwegian publisher (born 1943)

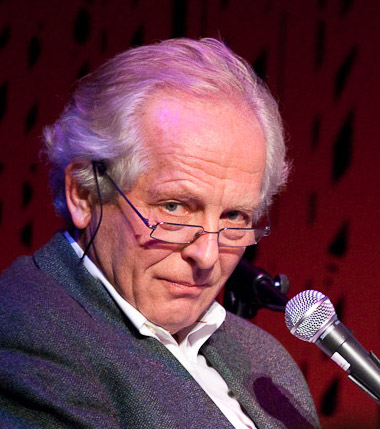
- Nygaard in 2009
- Born: 16 March 1943 (age 83); Oslo, Norway
- Education: Degree in economics
- Occupations: Publisher and businessman
- Known for: Chief publisher (CEO) of Aschehoug publishing house
- Children: 2
- Relatives: William Martin Nygaard (grandfather)

William Nygaard (born 16 March 1943) is a Norwegian retired businessman and publisher, who was the CEO of publishing company Aschehoug and the chairman of the Norwegian Broadcasting Corporation.

== Business career ==
From 1974 to 2010, Nygaard was the chief publisher of Aschehoug, Norway's second largest publishing house, which is owned by the Nygaard family. When William Nygaard took this job, he followed the footsteps of his father Mads Wiel Nygaard and grandfather William Martin Nygaard, who had led the company in earlier years, and the tradition continues since he left the job to his son, Mads Nygaard. William Nygaard was chairman of the Norwegian Publishers Association from 1987 to 1990. From 2010 to 2014, he was employed as a director of NRK (the state-owned TV of Norway).

== Assassination attempt ==
On 12 April 1989, Aschehoug and William Nygaard were responsible for publishing the Norwegian edition of Salman Rushdie's novel The Satanic Verses. This was two months after Ayatollah Khomeini issued the following fatwa against Rushdie and his publishers:

I inform all zealous Muslims of the world that the author of the book entitled The Satanic Verses — which has been compiled, printed and published in opposition to Islam, the Prophet, and the Qur'an — and all those involved in its publication who were aware of its content, are sentenced to death. I call on all zealous Muslims to execute them quickly, wherever they may be found, so that no one else will dare to insult the Muslim sanctities. God Willing, whoever is killed on this path is a martyr.

Owing to the fatwa, direct threats were made against Nygaard and translator Kari Risvik, and in the resulting controversy, Nygaard was given police protection for a period.

On the morning of 11 October 1993, Nygaard was shot three times outside his home in Dagaliveien in Oslo. Most people — including Nygaard — link the incident to the fatwa. After several months of hospitalization, mostly at Sunnaas Hospital, Nygaard slowly recovered. In early October 2018, almost a quarter-century after the attempted assassination, charges were made against the alleged perpetrators. Their names and nationalities were not publicized at the time. In November 2021, the two were identified as the Lebanese man Khaled Moussawi and an unnamed former Iranian diplomat.

== Other positions ==
Both before and after the attack, William Nygaard has been an outspoken defender of free speech, and is a board member of the Norwegian division of International PEN. He is a member of the Norwegian Academy for Language and Literature.

Nygaard has been a member of the board of Norway's National Museum of Art, Architecture and Design. In 2010, he was elected chairman of the Norwegian Broadcasting Corporation.

== Personal life ==
Nygaard has two children.

== Awards ==
- 1994: Fritt Ord Award.
- 1998: Segerstedt award
- 1998: knight of 1. class of St. Olavs Orden
- 1998: (with Salman Rushdie) honorary doctor at Universitetet i Tromsø
- 2019: Gunnar Sønstebys award

Awards
Preceded by Rolv Ryssdal	Recipient of the Fritt Ord Award; 1994	Succeeded by Hanne Sophie Greve
Media offices
Preceded by Hallvard Bakke	Chair of the Norwegian Broadcasting Corporation; 2010–2014	Succeeded by Birger Magnus
