= Stefan Kutzsche =

Norwegian physician

- Born: 15 April 1954 (age 72); Frankfurt am Main
- Education: University of Hamburg; University of Oslo
- Scientific career
- Fields: Medicine (pediatrics, neonatology, anesthesiology, medical ethics, education)
- Workplaces: Oslo University Hospital; University of Oslo; University of Tromsø; International Medical University; No. 330 Squadron RNoAF
- Thesis: Effects of hypoxemia and reoxygenation on cerebral microcirculation, nitric oxide, hydrogen peroxide and excitatory amino acid concentrations (2002)
- Doctoral advisor: Ola Didrik Saugstad

Stefan Kutzsche (born 15 April 1954) is a Norwegian paediatrician, neonatologist, anaesthesiologist, and historian of medicine. His research has focused on neonatal brain injury physiology and critical-care physiology, alongside work in medical ethics, medical education, and the history of child healthcare.

== Background and career ==
He graduated as a medical doctor at the University of Hamburg in 1983 and obtained a PhD (dr.med.) degree in neonatology from the University of Oslo in 2002. He is double board certified in paediatrics and anaesthesiology.

He has particularly worked with the treatment of children with acute severe illness or injury. He was a senior consultant in pediatric anesthesia, pediatric intensive care, and neonatal intensive care at Oslo University Hospital, Ullevål between 1994 and 2014, heading the Pediatric Intensive Care department for a period. He also worked at the University of Tromsø and the University of Oslo. He served for twelve years with No. 330 Squadron of the Royal Norwegian Air Force in Banak on search and rescue (SAR) and air ambulance missions in northernmost Norway and the waters of the High North, and was later chief physician at the Norwegian Air Ambulance Foundation. He spent four years in Kuala Lumpur as an associate professor at the International Medical University (IMU) and director of the IMU Centre for Education. He has also taken part in medical humanitarian work in Cambodia and Laos, including at the Angkor Hospital for Children. In 2019 he became a special advisor for education at Oslo University Hospital.

He has been a member and chairman of the Board for Licensing Matters and Foreign Medical Practitioners in Norway (1998–2007), a board member of the Norwegian Society of Pediatricians and editor of its journal Paidos, a member of the Norwegian specialty committee for pediatrics, and a member of the clinical ethics committee at Oslo University Hospital. He is an advisory member of the IMU Centre for Bioethics and Humanities, and is a board member of two charitable funds of the Oslo Women's Public Health Association. He is a member of the editorial committee of Acta Paediatrica.

== Research ==
His biomedical research has centred on neonatal brain injury physiology and critical-care physiology, while he has also published in medical ethics, medical education, and the history of child healthcare. Within neonatology and neuroscience, his research focus concerned how oxygen-related processes influence secondary brain injury in newborn infants following perinatal asphyxia. Working with his doctoral advisor Ola Didrik Saugstad, he studied how the oxygen concentration used during emergency resuscitation (100% oxygen versus normal air) might affect neurological injury and recovery, a question of major clinical importance and one of the most technically and ethically challenging areas in modern neonatal care because treatment must be given within minutes and may influence both survival and long-term neurological outcome. He and other members of Saugstad's research group helped question the long-standing routine use of 100% oxygen during newborn resuscitation, and he contributed to the early experimental and physiological research in the 1990s that helped lay the groundwork for the amendment of international resuscitation guidelines in 2010. He has also published experimental studies on systemic inflammation and critical-care physiology, including work on endotoxemia and organ responses in large-animal models. He has published over 35 papers in medical journals, including in Pediatrics, Pediatric Research, Biology of the Neonate, Critical Care Medicine, Pediatric Critical Care Medicine, Thrombosis Research, Acta Paediatrica, and Acta Anaesthesiologica Scandinavica.

== Selected publications ==
- Meberg, A; Kutzsche, S; Schøyen, R (1987). "Konjunktivitt i tidlig nyfødtperiode: Erfaringer fra en barselavdeling etter opphørt Credé-profylakse [Conjunctivitis in the early neonatal period: Experiences from a maternity ward after cessation of Credé's prophylaxis]". Journal of the Norwegian Medical Association. 107 (30): 2619–20, 2622. PMID 3424295.
- Kutzsche, S; Kirkeby, OJ; Rise, IR; Saugstad, OD (1999). "Effects of hypoxia and reoxygenation with 21% and 100%-oxygen on cerebral nitric oxide concentration and microcirculation in newborn piglets". Biology of the Neonate. 76 (3): 153–167. doi:10.1159/000014155. PMID 10460953. S2CID 37786756.
- Kutzsche, S; Schlichting, E; Aspelin, T; Lyberg, T (2000). "Hemodynamic changes and systemic activation of coagulation and fibrinolysis during controlled endotoxemia in pigs". Thrombosis Research. 98 (6): 517–529. doi:10.1016/S0049-3848(00)00189-4. PMID 10899351.
- Kirkeby, OJ; Kutzsche, S; Risøe, C; Rise, IR (2000). "Cerebral nitric oxide concentration and microcirculation during hypercapnia, hypoxia, and high intracranial pressure in pigs". Journal of Clinical Neuroscience. 7 (6): 531–538. doi:10.1054/jocn.2000.0788. PMID 11029235. S2CID 30013849.
- Kutzsche, S; Ilves, P; Kirkeby, OJ; Saugstad, OD (2001). "Hydrogen peroxide production in leukocytes during cerebral hypoxia and reoxygenation with 100% or 21% oxygen in newborn piglets". Pediatric Research. 49 (6): 834–842. doi:10.1203/00006450-200106000-00020. PMID 11385146.
- Kutzsche, S; Lyberg, T; Bjertnæs, LJ (2001). "Effects of adenosine on extravascular lung water content in endotoxemic pigs". Critical Care Medicine. 29 (12): 2371–3276. doi:10.1097/00003246-200112000-00021. PMID 11801842. S2CID 12747189.
- Solås, AB; Kutzsche, S; Vinje, M; Saugstad, OD (2001). "Cerebral hypoxemia-ischemia and reoxygenation with 21% or 100% oxygen in newborn piglets: effects on extracellular levels of excitatory amino acids and microcirculation". Pediatric Critical Care Medicine. 2 (4): 340–345. doi:10.1097/00130478-200110000-00011. PMID 12793938. S2CID 5675801.
- Kutzsche, S; Solås, AB; Lyberg, T; Saugstad, OD (2002). "Nitric oxide synthesis inhibition during cerebral hypoxemia and reoxygenation with 100% oxygen in newborn pigs". Biology of the Neonate. 82 (3): 197–206. doi:10.1159/000063613. PMID 12373071. S2CID 25527292.
- Kutzsche, S (2002). Effects of hypoxemia and reoxygenation on cerebral microcirculation, nitric oxide, hydrogen peroxide and excitatory amino acid concentrations. An experimental study in newborn pigs. Oslo: Department of Pediatric Research and Institute for Surgical Research, Rikshospitalet, University of Oslo. ISBN 978-82-8072-035-1.
- Kutzsche, S; Sangolt, GK; Schistad, O; Sunde, S (2003). "Severe complications during the management of a child with late presentation of a diaphragmatic hernia". Acta Anaesthesiologica Scandinavica. 47 (10): 1302–4. doi:10.1046/j.1399-6576.2003.00215.x. PMID 14616333. S2CID 8841616.
- Haukland, LU; Kutzsche, S; Hovden, IAH; Stiris, T (2013). "Neonatal seizures with reversible EEG changes after antenatal venlafaxine exposure". Acta Paediatrica. 102 (11): 524–526. doi:10.1111/apa.12375. PMID 23909790. S2CID 44456417.
- Kutzsche, S; Partridge, JC; Leuthner, SR; Lantos, JD (2013). "When Life-Sustaining Treatment Is Withdrawn and the Patient Doesn't Die". Pediatrics. 132 (5): 893–897. doi:10.1542/peds.2013-0413. PMID 24101767. S2CID 31966270.
- Kutzsche, S; Kutzsche, H; Dornan, T (2014). "What do paediatric trainees require from their clinical supervisors?". Acta Paediatrica. 103 (4): 169–172. doi:10.1111/apa.12534. PMID 24325150. S2CID 25439482.
- Wendel, K; Akkök, ÇA; Kutzsche, S (2017). "Neonatal alloimmune thrombocytopaenia associated with maternal HLA antibodies". BMJ Case Reports. 2017: bcr–2016–218269. doi:10.1136/bcr-2016-218269. PMC 5534834. PMID 28679510.
- Kutzsche, S (2018). "John Langdon Down (1828–1896) – a pioneer in caring for mentally disabled patients". Acta Paediatrica. 107 (11): 1851–1854. doi:10.1111/apa.14505. PMID 30028542. S2CID 51702957.
- Khoo, EJ; Parameshwara, N; Kutzsche, S (2019). "Parents' perceptions of bedside teaching". The Clinical Teacher. 16 (3): 497–501. doi:10.1111/tct.12967. PMID 30421519. S2CID 53292617.
- Khoo, EJ; Chua, SH; Kutzsche, S (2019). "Applying educational theories into planning a psychomotor learning activity: an undergraduate neonatal resuscitation programme experience". Archivos Argentinos de Pediatria. 117 (2): e181–e187. doi:10.5546/aap.2019.eng.e181. PMID 30869503.
- Kutzsche, S; Khoo, EJ (2019). "Learning perceptions of medical students engaged in clinical teaching postings in neonatal intensive care units". The Asia Pacific Scholar. 4 (2): 32–38. doi:10.29060/TAPS.2019-4-2/OA2054.
- Kutzsche, S (2019). "The humanitarian legacy of Fe del Mundo (1911–2011) who shaped the modern child healthcare system in the Philippines". Acta Paediatrica. 108 (8): 1362–1384. doi:10.1111/apa.14842. PMID 31077455. S2CID 149454689.
- Kutzsche, S (2020). "Ernst Moro (1874–1951) was much more than the reflex that was named after him". Acta Paediatrica. 110 (2): 400–403. doi:10.1111/apa.15504. PMID 32726477. S2CID 220877525.
- Chia, CF; Nadarajah, VD; Lim, V; Kutzsche, S (2020). "Transfer of knowledge, skills and confidence from a faculty development programme for health professions educators into practice". Medical Teacher. 43 (sup1): S46–S52. doi:10.1080/0142159X.2020.1776239. PMID 32552199. S2CID 219904603.
- Kutzsche, S (2021). "Abraham Jacobi (1830–1919) and his transition from political to medical activist". Acta Paediatrica. 110 (8): 2303–2305. doi:10.1111/apa.15887. PMID 33963612. S2CID 233998658.
- Kutzsche, S (2023). "Adalbert Czerny (1863–1941) and his contribution to the fight against infant mortality". Acta Paediatrica. 112 (4): 642–644. doi:10.1111/apa.16627. PMID 36513611. S2CID 254708876.
- Kutzsche, S (2023). "Sir George Frederic Still (1868–1941) and his service to paediatrics and society". Acta Paediatrica. 112 (6): 1182–1184. doi:10.1111/apa.16713. PMID 36794644. S2CID 256900495.
- Kutzsche, S (2023). "How pioneering paediatrician Andrés Martínez Vargas (1861–1948) improved child health in Spain in the late 19th and early 20th centuries". Acta Paediatrica. 112 (11): 2276–2278. doi:10.1111/apa.16935. PMID 37543715. S2CID 260608718.
- Kutzsche, S (2024). "How Madeleine Brès (1842–1921) paved the way for female paediatricians in France". Acta Paediatrica. 113 (5): 858–860. doi:10.1111/apa.17134. PMID 38279006. S2CID 267268573.
- Kutzsche, S (2024). "How Nil Filatov (1847–1902) influenced the evolution of Russian paediatrics in the 19th century". Acta Paediatrica. 113 (7): 1516–1518. doi:10.1111/apa.17148. PMID 38337155. S2CID 267578676.
- Khoo, EJ; Kutzsche, S (2024). "How Cicely Williams (1893–1992) accelerated progress in maternal and child health during the 20th century". Acta Paediatrica. 113 (9): 2028–2030. doi:10.1111/apa.17251. PMID 38644646. S2CID 269291966.
- Kutzsche, S; Coombes, AGA (2024). "Arvo Ylppö (1887–1992) made a leading contribution to Finland's achievements in child healthcare in the 20th century". Acta Paediatrica. 114 (1): 56–58. doi:10.1111/apa.17447. PMID 39373175. S2CID 273179990.
- Kutzsche, S; Nalliah, S (2024). "Charles West (1816–1898): Pioneering paediatrician and midwifery advocate in 19th century medicine". Acta Paediatrica. 114 (2): 299–302. doi:10.1111/apa.17476. PMID 39450779. S2CID 273588116.
- Kutzsche, S; Nalliah, S (2024). "Peter MacNaughton Dunn (1929–2021) energised paediatric medicine in the 20th and 21st centuries through linking effective partnerships in perinatal care". Acta Paediatrica. 114 (3): 512–514. doi:10.1111/apa.17505. PMID 39540309.
- Kutzsche, S; Nalliah, S (2025). "William Aaron Silverman (1917–2004) was a Pioneer of Evidence-Based Medicine and Advocate for Families and Children Born Preterm". Acta Paediatrica. 114 (6): 1122–1125. doi:10.1111/apa.70039. PMID 39976158.
- Kutzsche, S; Nalliah, S (2025). "Roberto Caldeyro-Barcia – a pioneer in obstetrics". Journal of the Norwegian Medical Association. 145 (8): 690–694. doi:10.4045/tidsskr.25.0167. PMID 40575816.
- Khoo, EJ; Chan, MY; Kutzsche, S; Verhagen, E (2025). "Balancing Ethics and Equity: Rethinking Commercial Milk Formula Industry Partnerships in Maternal and Child Health". Acta Paediatrica. 114 (7): 1548–1549. doi:10.1111/apa.70053. hdl:11370/227957d3-3608-41db-b2ad-ca9dbe15e3f7. PMID 40028920.
