= Brian King =

Brian King may refer to:

- Brian King (epidemiologist) (born 1982), director of the Food and Drug Administration’s Center for Tobacco Products (CTP)
- Brian King (bishop) (1938–2006), assistant bishop in the Anglican Diocese of Sydney
- Brian King (writer), American screenwriter and director
- Brian King (politician) (born 1959), member of the Utah House of Representatives
- Brian King (sculptor) (1942–2017), Irish artist
- Brian King (curler) (born 1981), Canadian curler
- Brian King, Canadian police officer, see Murder of Brian King
- Brian King, 14-year-old murdered by Jason Massey in 1993

== See also ==
- Bryan King (disambiguation)
