= Kutzsche =

Kutzsche, Kutsche (pronounced [ˈkʊtʃə]) or Kutscha (pronounced [ˈkʊtʃɐ]) is a surname of Upper Sorbian origin, a Germanized rendering of the Sorbian diminutive/nickname Kućo (pronounced [ˈkutɕɔ]; "the man from the house"), from the Slavic word kuča ("house"), that is found across Slavic languages. Its form is typical of Upper Sorbian family names adapted into German spelling conventions: the palatal ć was written as tsch or tzsch, and the Slavic diminutive ending -o was replaced with German -e, resulting in the ending -sche which is typical of Germanized Slavic surnames. The surname is historically concentrated in Upper Lusatia and adjacent parts of Saxony, Bohemia, and Silesia, areas with strong Sorbian-speaking traditions. The root word is widespread across the Slavic languages; from it developed diminutive or nickname forms such as Sorbian Kućo, with close cognates in South Slavic (Koćo). The root is derived from Proto-Slavic *kъtja (house).

== West Slavic origin as Kućo ==
Kućo
- Pronunciation: [ˈkut͡ɕɔ]

Origin
- Language: Upper Sorbian
- Meaning: Person associated with a house
- Region of origin: Sorbia

Other names
- Alternative spelling: Kutsche, Kutzsche
- Cognate: Koćo

The surname is characteristically of Sorbian and specifically of Upper Sorbian origin. It derives from the Slavic root kuča ("house", "dwelling"), from which the diminutive or nickname Kućo was formed with the typical Slavic masculine ending -o. Like many surnames that likely emerged in the Late Middle Ages, it began as a spoken nickname referring to a man identified with a particular household or as the head of a specific, locally recognized house. It carried no implication of a marginal or insignificant dwelling; rather, such a nickname would have signaled local recognition of the house and its occupant as an established, stable household within the village community. With the rise of parish registers in the 16th century, such oral names were written down and gradually stabilized as hereditary surnames.

Upper Lusatia, the core area of the name, as a part of the Crown of Bohemia within the Holy Roman Empire (1618)

The surname is clustered and likely developed in Upper Lusatia, the Sorbian core area around Bautzen, Kamenz, and Ortrand. Originally settled by the West Slavic Milceni, the region came under the Kingdom of Bohemia in 1319 and remained there until 1635, when it was ceded to the Electorate of Saxony. Sorbian was the majority language in the countryside until the 18th century, while German dominated in towns and administration. Although linguistically very close to Czech, Upper Sorbian was geographically cut off from the Czech-speaking lands and Sorbian survived as a smaller Slavic "island" in a largely German-speaking environment. This isolation helped preserve it as a distinct language instead of being absorbed into the Czech dialect continuum and standard language, but also made it vulnerable to gradual Germanization. By the 19th century, German had become culturally and administratively dominant, yet Sorbian speech and nicknames like Kućo persisted in the countryside, shaping the Germanized spellings Kutsche/Kutzsche found in parish records.

From the 17th century onward, as Sorbian names were increasingly recorded in German orthography, Kućo was adapted to fit German spelling conventions. Clerks typically replaced the palatal ć with tsch or tzsch and altered the final -o to -e. The ending -sche is typical of Germanized Slavic surnames. In the early 19th century, flatter simplified spellings like Kutsche were common, though by the mid-19th century a more consistent habit developed of using -tzsch- to capture the palatal quality of Sorbian ć/č more precisely, an indication that the Sorbian spoken form was still actively heard at the time, even as names were Germanized. The -tzsch- cluster is unusual in Germany and strongly tied to Lusatia/Saxony. Such variation in spelling was typical of the period and should not be seen as "mistakes." Before the 19th century, names had no single fixed form; spelling simply mirrored how local clerks heard the spoken nickname. The spoken name was primary, and the different written versions—Kutsche, Kutzsche, etc.—are best understood as phases in how the same Sorbian original was rendered in German writing. Compared to a modern standard German pronunciation of Kut(z)sche, the Sorbian form Kućo ends in a strong full vowel [ɔ], while German Kut(z)sche ends in a reduced schwa [ə]. The Sorbian affricate [t͡ɕ] is softer and more palatal (similar to Polish ć), whereas the German [t͡ʃ] is harder, comparable to English ch.

Some older dictionaries broadly attribute the surname to "Polish," but in Lusatia the origin is clearly Sorbian. German name dictionaries are often less precise in their treatment of Slavic names and often attribute such surnames broadly to "Polish." Onomast Hans Bahlow wrote that the name Kutsche, when found in the historical East Central German linguistic area, is "clearly of Slavic origin."

The root kuča ("house", "dwelling") is found across the Slavic languages (Sorbian kuča, Polish kuczka, dialectal Czech kuča, Slovak kučka, Slovene koča, Bosnian/Croatian/Serbian kuća (kȕća), Bulgarian къ́ща (kǎ́šta), Macedonian ку́ќа (kúḱa)). From it developed diminutive or nickname forms such as Sorbian Kućo, with close cognates in South Slavic (Koćo). In Dalmatia Italianized forms such as Cucci, Cuco, Cuci may be encountered. The West and South Slavic languages kept the "house" meaning much more clearly, while in East Slavic the word drifted semantically but survived in surnames through place-names and older dialectal meanings. Within West and South Slavic, the degree of transparency varies: Serbo-Croatian still uses kuća as the everyday word for "house," with the diminutive Koćo directly paralleling Sorbian Kućo; in Czech the root survives only in archaic or dialectal form, while in Polish it shifted toward diminutives (kuczka). The root kuča is derived from Proto-Slavic *kъtja (house).

In modern Lusatia, the Germanized forms of Sorbian surnames are generally understood as products of historical administrative practice rather than accurate reflections of Sorbian phonology. Within contemporary Sorbian cultural and linguistic contexts, it is common to acknowledge or reference the underlying Sorbian forms of surnames in general, even when the officially registered German spelling remains unchanged. This belongs to a broader trend in Sorbian communities of recognizing and, in some settings, reviving original Sorbian orthography as part of cultural identity.

== Similar names with different etymologies ==
Outside the Sorbian settlement area, some rare cases of the surname may potentially derive from the German noun Kutsche ("coach"), itself borrowed in the 16th century from Hungarian kocsi ("from Kocs"). The borrowing is relatively late in German, after surnames had typically stabilized, and surnames derived from it are uncommon; when they occur, they are more likely to be found in larger urban centers or regions with direct ties to long-distance transport.

== Distribution ==
Today the surname is relatively uncommon across Germany as a whole, but it is disproportionately found in Saxony and Brandenburg, especially in the historical Sorbian-speaking districts around Bautzen and Kamenz. This regional concentration supports a primarily Sorbian etymology in those areas, with the Hungarian/occupational explanation applying only to isolated occurrences elsewhere.

== People ==
People with variants of the surname include:

- Stefan Kutzsche (born 1954), Norwegian pediatrician
- Werner Kutzsche (1911–2000), German engineer and Professor of information technology
