= Brian King (epidemiologist) =

American epidemiologist (born 1982)

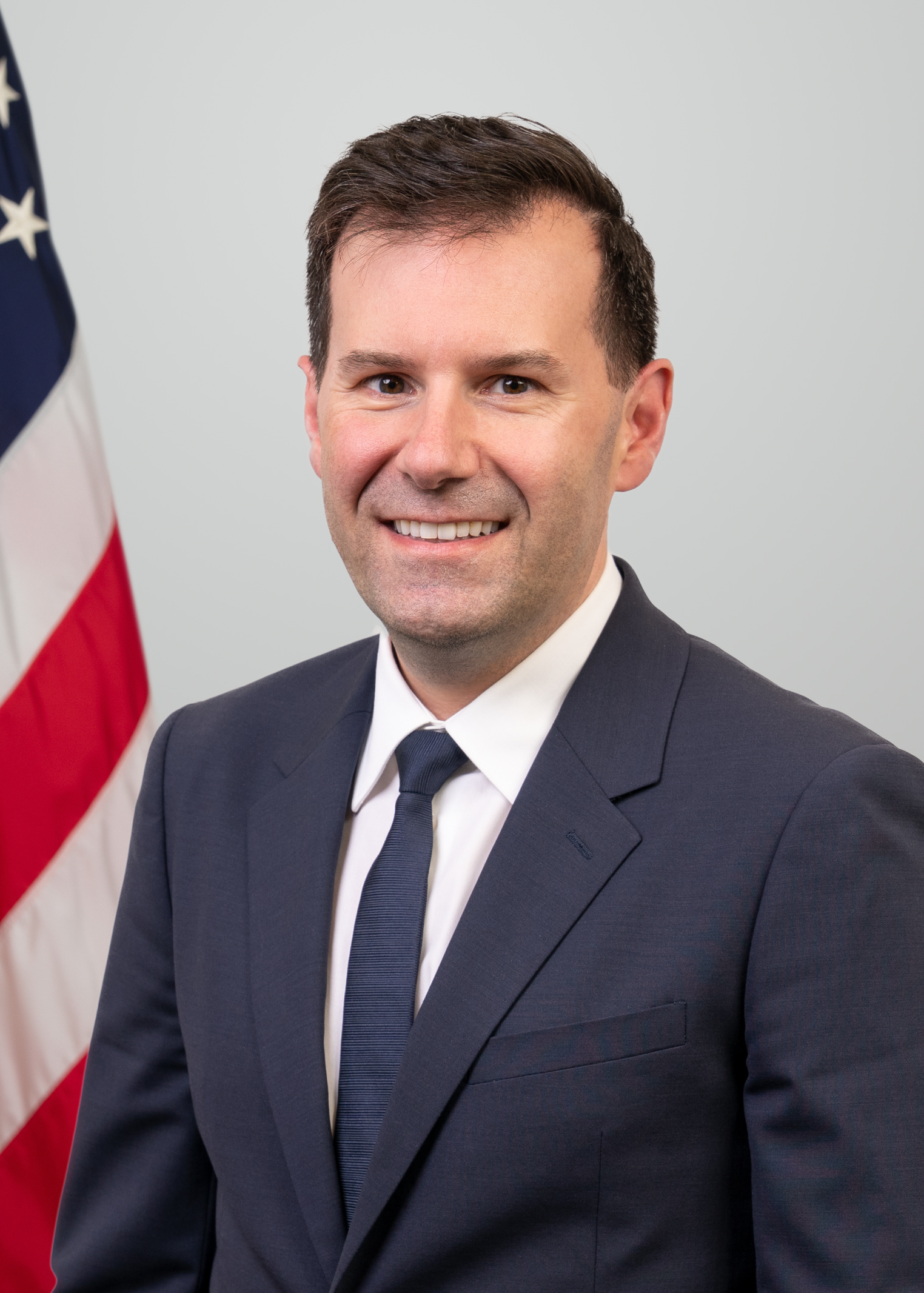
- Born: September 5, 1982 (age 44); Rochester, New York, U.S.
- Education: University at Buffalo (B.S., MPH, Ph.D.)
- Occupation: Executive Vice President for U.S. Programs
- Employer: Campaign for Tobacco-Free Kids
- Known for: Tobacco prevention and control
- Height: 5'10
- Website: https://tobaccofreekids.org

Brian King (born September 5, 1982) is an American epidemiologist who was the director of the Food and Drug Administration's Center for Tobacco Products (CTP) from July 2022 to April 2025. As the nation's top regulator for tobacco products, he championed a public health lens towards regulation, during which cigarette smoking among U.S. adults reached below 10 percent for the first time in recorded history and tobacco product use among U.S. youth reached a 25-year low, including the lowest levels of youth e-cigarette use in a decade. He is currently the executive vice president for U.S. Programs at the Campaign for Tobacco-Free Kids.

Prior to joining FDA, he served as the deputy director for research translation in CDC's Office on Smoking and Health, and more recently as the Executive Editor of CDC's Morbidity & Mortality Weekly Report Series and as leadership for the agency's response to various public health emergencies, including COVID-19. Prior to his tenure at CDC, he was a research affiliate in the Division of Cancer Prevention and Population Sciences at Roswell Park Comprehensive Cancer Center in Buffalo, New York.

He has authored more than 225 scientific journal articles related to tobacco prevention and control. He served as a senior editor for multiple U.S. Surgeon General's Reports on tobacco, including "Smoking Cessation: A Report of the Surgeon General" (2020). He was also lead author of CDC's 2014 evidence-based guide for states, "Best Practices for Comprehensive Tobacco Control Programs."

== Early life and education ==
Brian Alexander King was born on September 5, 1982, in Rochester, New York, to Elaine Louise (née Tripi; 1949–2020) and Geoffrey Walrath King (born 1946). He is the second of three children born to both parents. His father is a University at Buffalo (SUNY)-educated optical physicist who has held various positions in the field with Xerox and at the University of Rochester. King's mother, an alumna of University at Buffalo (SUNY), was a medical technologist at Monroe Community Hospital prior to full-time motherhood. He is the third generation of his family to earn a college degree.

King grew up in Webster, New York, a suburb of Rochester. He was an ambitious child interested in science, government, and the creative arts. In high school, he served as vice president of the school's chapter of the National Honor Society, and as captain of the varsity tennis team. He is also an accomplished pianist, and performed at numerous community events, including The Great New York State Fair. In 1997, he earned the rank of Eagle Scout with the Boy Scouts of America.

King attended Bishop Kearney High School in Irondequoit, New York (2000). After completing his primary and secondary studies, he was accepted to the University at Buffalo (SUNY), where he earned a Bachelor of Science degree in biological sciences with a minor in music. (2004). King went on to earn Master of Public Health (2006), and Doctor of Philosophy (2010) degrees in epidemiology at the University at Buffalo (SUNY). His doctoral dissertation advisor was Andrew Hyland, current chair of the Department of Health Behavior at Roswell Park Comprehensive Cancer Center in Buffalo, New York.

== Career ==
=== Roswell Park Comprehensive Cancer Center ===
In 2005, King was hired as a quitline counselor at the New York State Smokers' Quitline, which is housed at Roswell Park Comprehensive Cancer Center in Buffalo, New York. Concurrently, he was also working within the organization's Department of Health Behavior to complete the thesis for his Master of Public Health degree at University at Buffalo (SUNY); the thesis was focused on socioeconomic variation in tobacco product advertising across Western New York. In 2006, upon completion of his master's degree, he was hired as a research affiliate within the Department of Health Behavior, Division of Cancer Prevention and Population Sciences, at Roswell Park Comprehensive Cancer Center. The department was led at the time by Dr. K. Michael Cummings, and King reported directly to Dr. Andrew Hyland. Both had adjunct appointments at State University of New York at Buffalo, which enabled King to work at the Cancer Center concurrently to earning his PhD at the university.

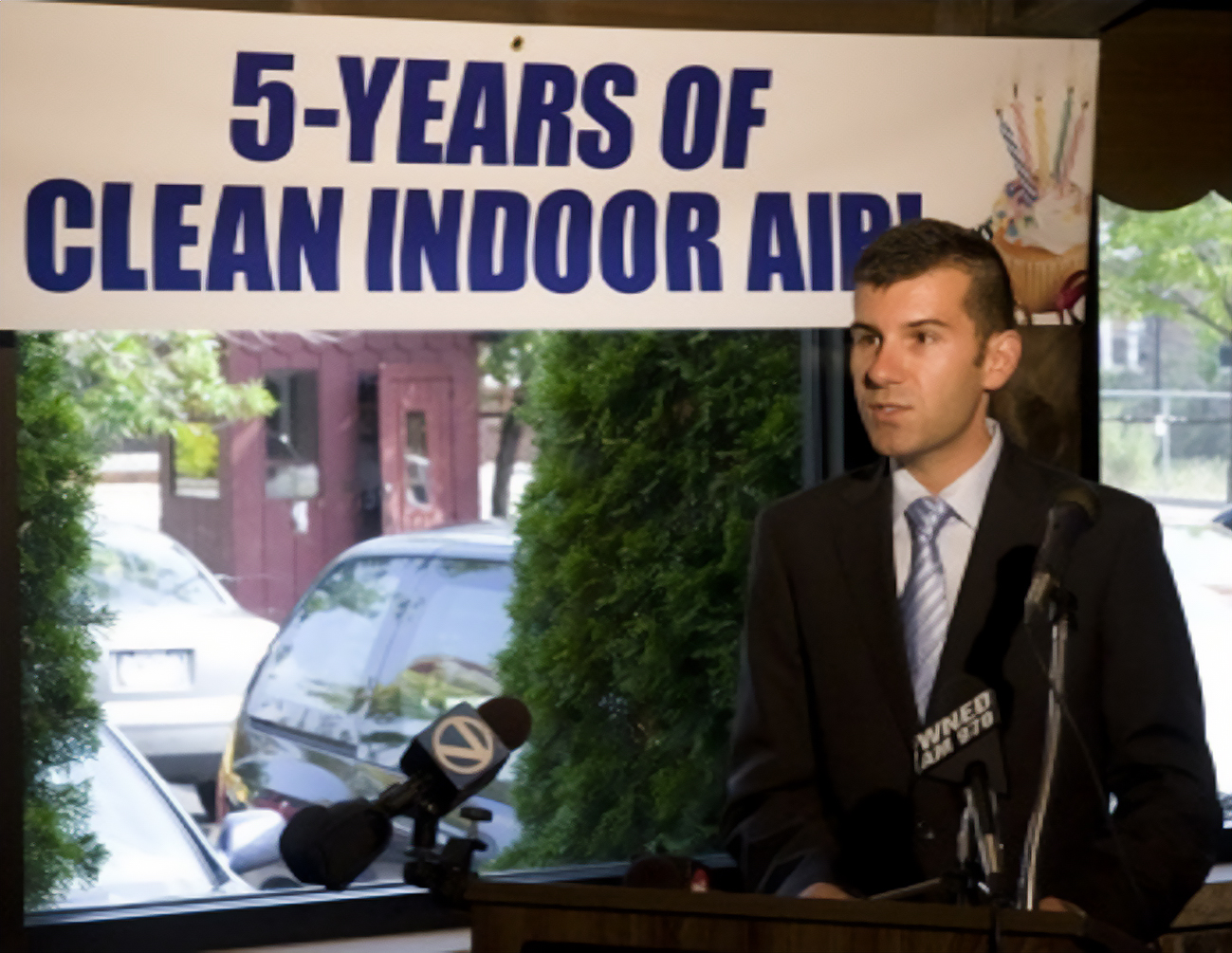
Dr. Brian King conducts a press conference to commemorate the 5-year anniversary of the 2003 New York State Clean Indoor Air Act.

During his time at Roswell Park, King led multiple projects, including those related to the observational assessment of tobacco advertising in retail venues, environmental assessments of particulate matter from secondhand smoke in indoor environments, and population-based collection of data on tobacco-related issues, including through the New York State Adult Tobacco Survey and the International Tobacco Control Survey. He also initiated seminal research on secondhand smoke exposure in multiunit housing, which was the first of its kind internationally. This included the first study to document secondhand smoke exposure between apartments in a single multiunit housing building using environmental assessments of airborne particulate matter.

While at Roswell Park, King served as principal investigator of multiple grants, including a grant from the Flight Attendant Medical Research Institute (FAMRI) to assess secondhand smoke in multiunit housing, and an R36 dissertation grant from the U.S. Centers for Disease Control and Prevention to assess an intervention for enhanced adoption of smoke-free multiunit housing policies.

King first gained media experience during his time at Roswell Park, including serving as the organization's primary spokesperson during a press conference in 2008 to commemorate the 5-year anniversary of the 2003 New York State Clean Indoor Air Act.

=== Centers for Disease Control and Prevention (CDC) ===
In July 2010, King joined the Epidemic Intelligence Service (EIS) at CDC. He served as an EIS Officer during 2010–2012, during which he was assigned to the agency's Office on Smoking and Health (OSH) in the National Center for Chronic Disease Prevention and Health Promotion. He led multiple field investigations, including a study of indoor air quality from secondhand smoke in hospitality venues throughout American Samoa, Guam, and the Commonwealth of the Northern Mariana Islands.

Following completion of EIS, he was hired as an epidemiologist in OSH, and promoted to senior scientific advisor in 2014. In 2015, he assumed the role of deputy director for research translation in OSH. In this role, King led the agency's efforts related to a variety of high profile matters, including the rise in e-cigarette use among U.S. youth, and the 2014 update to the evidence-based state guide, "Best Practices for Comprehensive Tobacco Control Programs". He also served a critical role in the development and implementation of the U.S. Department of Housing and Urban Development's 2016 rule that prohibited smoking in public housing nationwide. He is also credited with introducing the "Tobacco Control Vaccine" framework, which was featured on the cover of the scientific journal Tobacco Control in 2018.

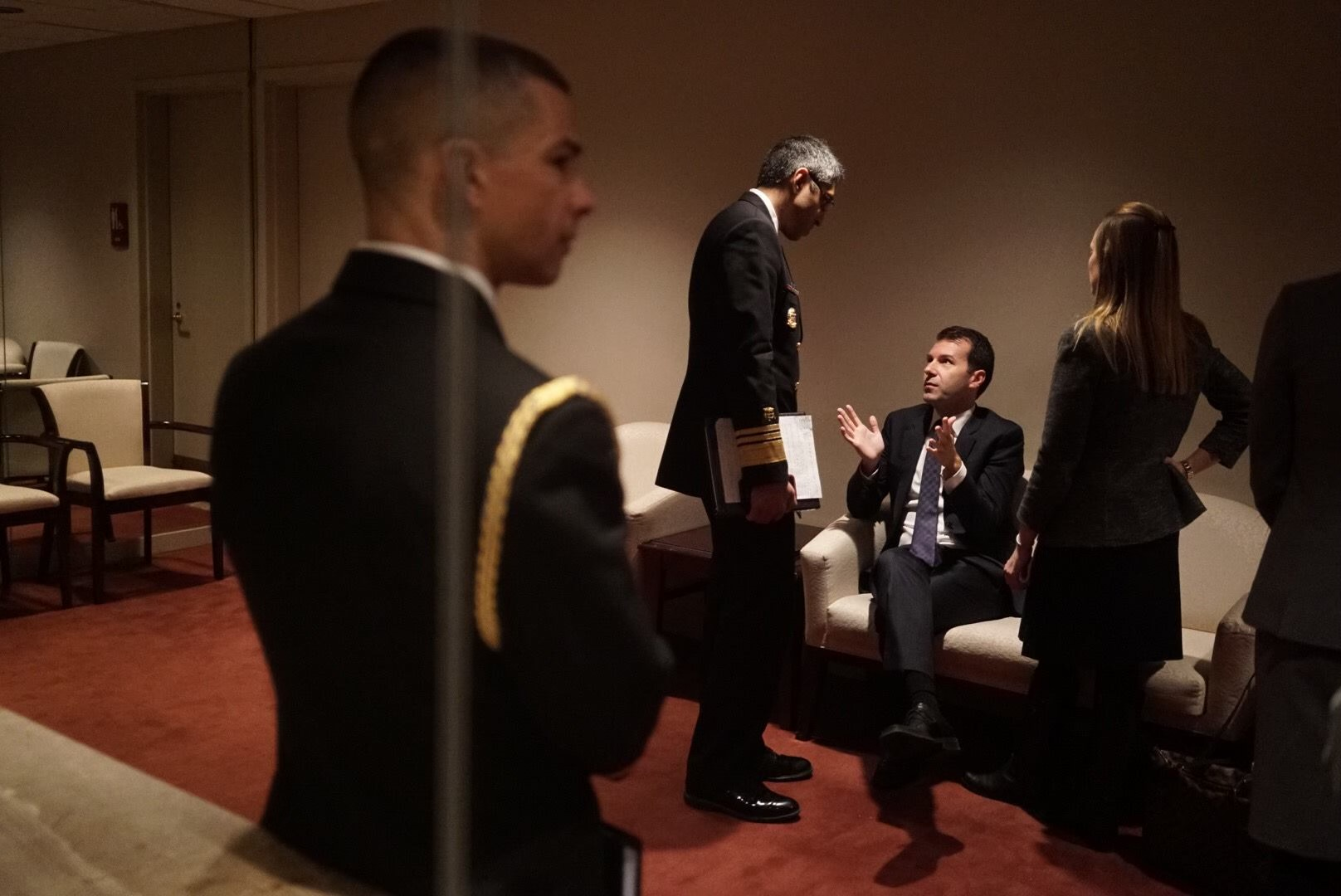
Dr. Brian King briefs U.S. Surgeon General Vivek Murthy prior to the release of the 2016 Surgeon General's Report on E-Cigarette Use Among Youth and Young Adults.

In his role as deputy director for research translation in OSH, King was also responsible for leading the U.S. Surgeon General's Reports on tobacco for the U.S. Government under multiple presidential administrations. He served as a reviewer for the 2012 Surgeon General's Report "Preventing Tobacco Use Among Youth and Young Adults"; an author of the 2014 Surgeon General's Report "The Health Consequences of Smoking-50 Years of Progress"; a senior editor of the 2016 Surgeon General's Report "E-cigarette Use Among Youth and Young Adults"; and a senior editor of the 2020 Surgeon General's Report "Smoking Cessation". He also led the 2018 Surgeon General's Advisory on E-cigarette Use Among Youth.

In March 2022, King was appointed the executive editor of CDC's Morbidity & Mortality Weekly Report series.

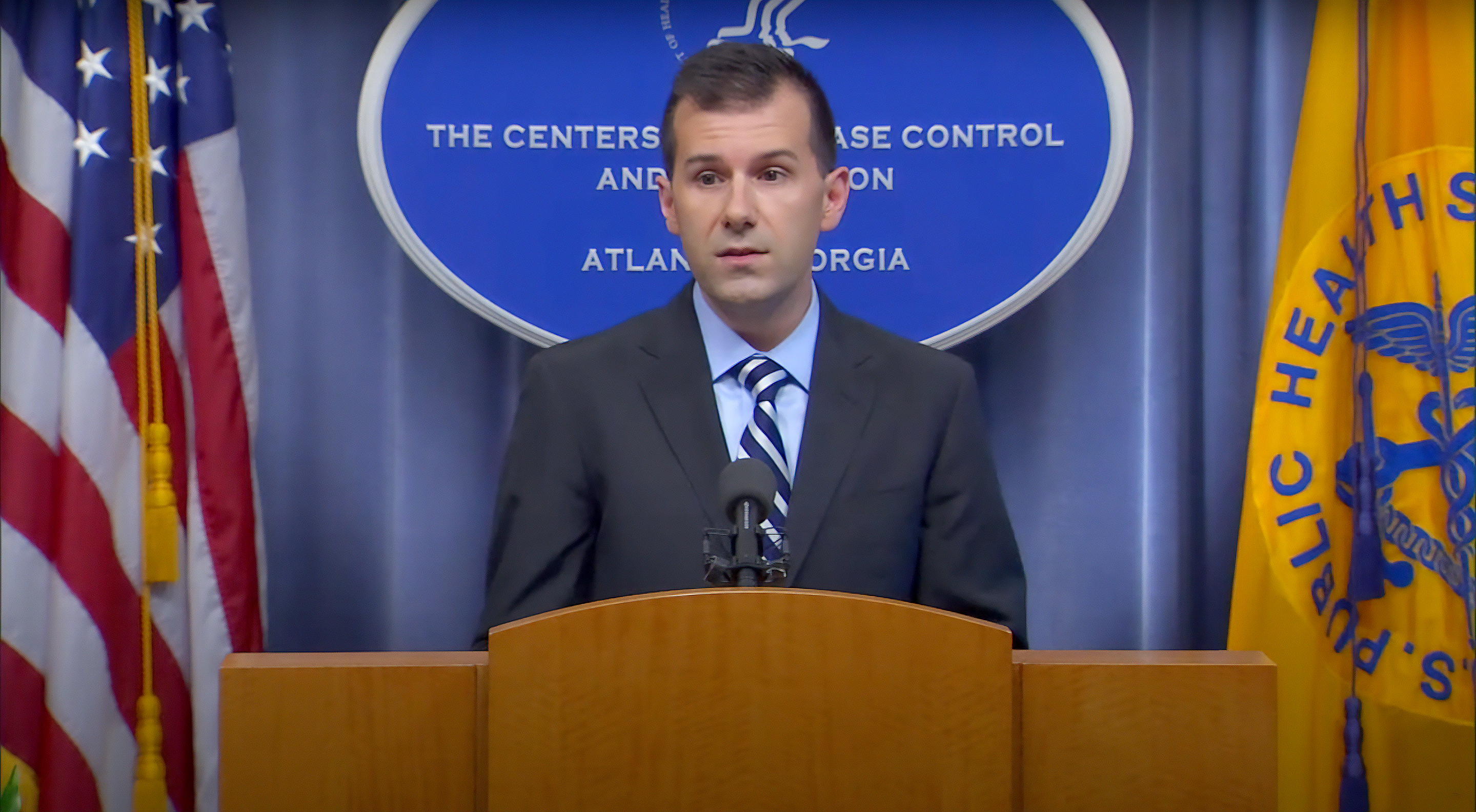
Dr. Brian King conducts a 2014 CDC press briefing on the Tips From Former Smokers Campaign.

During his tenure at CDC, King also served in various leadership capacities for the agency's responses to public health emergencies. He served as senior official for the agency's 2019 response to e-cigarette, or vaping, product use-associated lung injury (EVALI). During 2020-2022, he served in various capacities for the agency's response to coronavirus disease 2019 (COVID-19), including as deputy lead of the Chief Medical Officer Unit, deputy and then lead of the Strategic Science Unit, and finally as chief science officer.

King also served on various inter-agency committees during his tenure at CDC. During 2015–2022, King served as CDC's ex officio delegate to FDA's Tobacco Product Scientific Advisory Committee (TPSAC). During 2015-2022, he served as lead for Tobacco Use Objectives for Healthy People 2020 and Health People 2030.

King served as a primary spokesperson on tobacco-related issues for CDC during his tenure, and frequently participated in interviews with the news media from major national and international television, radio, and print outlets.

=== U.S. Food and Drug Administration (FDA) ===
In July 2022, King was appointed the director of FDA's Center for Tobacco Products (CTP) by FDA Commissioner Dr. Robert Califf. In this role, he served as the lead tobacco regulatory official for the United States, and was responsible for overseeing the implementation of the 2009 Family Smoking Prevention and Tobacco Control Act.

King was the first scientist to be appointed as CTP director, with his two predecessors being a medical doctor and a lawyer, respectively. King's appointment was applauded by public health organizations and the scientific community, and criticized by some industry organizations, most notably e-cigarette advocacy organizations. A few weeks after King's arrival as center director, the FDA commissioner requested an independent evaluation of the center's programmatic activities by the Reagan-Udall Foundation. Following the evaluation, a new strategic plan was released under King's leadership in December 2023.

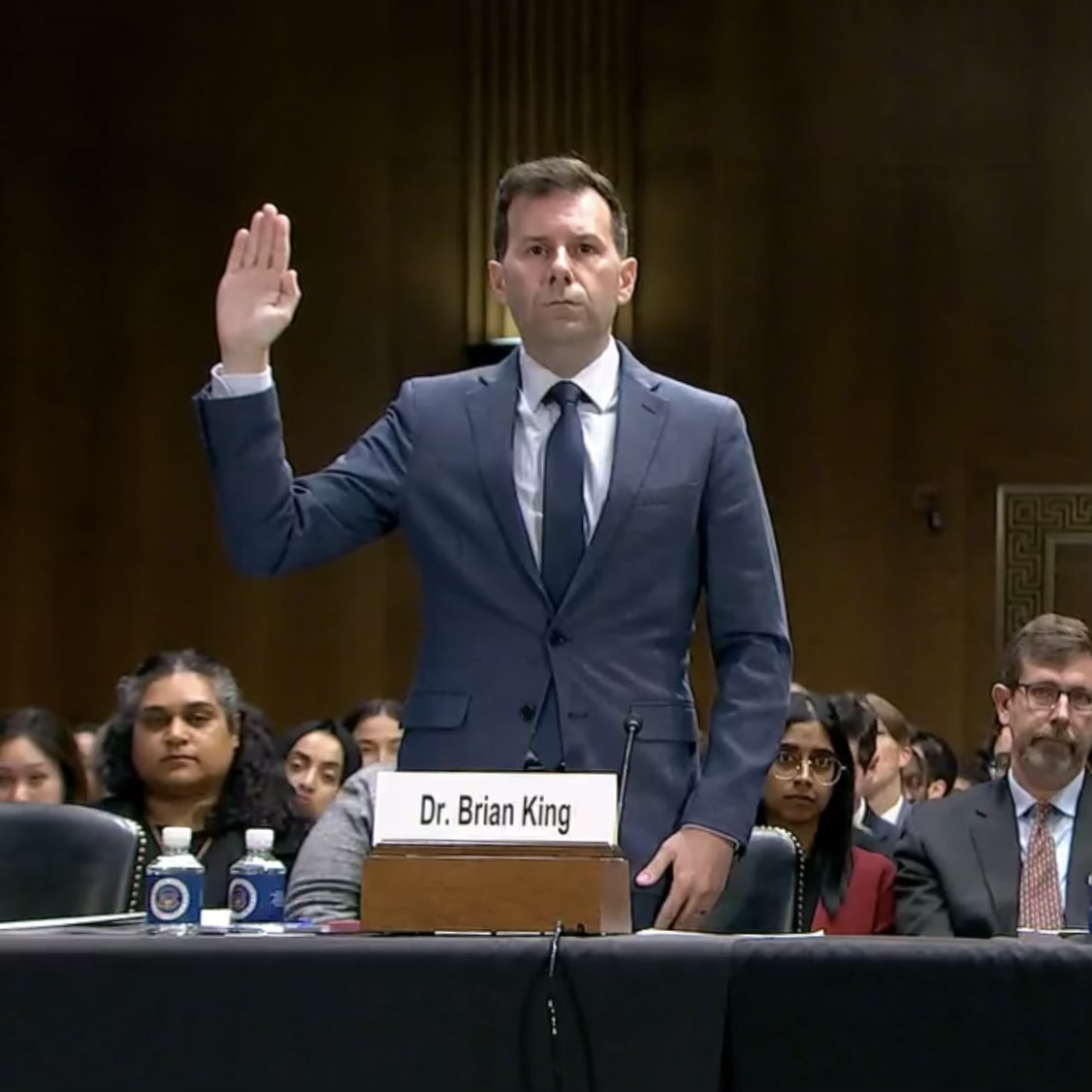
Director of the Food and Drug Administration's Center for Tobacco Products, Dr. Brian King, testifies before the Senate Judiciary Committee during a hearing on Capitol Hill, Wednesday, June 12, 2024, in Washington.

King assumed the role of CTP director during a period when FDA was embroiled in multiple high profile controversies, including the agency's decision to issue an administrative stay of its June 2022 marketing denial order to JUUL labs for its e-cigarette products; delays in the agency's review of premarket tobacco product applications, including its newly afforded authority by the U.S. Congress to regulate tobacco products containing synthetic nicotine; criticism over the agency's compliance and enforcement actions, particularly against e-cigarettes; and the resignation of CTP's Office of Science director, Dr. Matthew Holman, to assume a new role at Philip Morris International, the maker of Marlboro cigarettes. King publicly referred to his first several months at FDA as "baptism by blowtorch".

King's tenure as CTP director coincided with several high-profile efforts to push back on tobacco industry litigation against FDA; this included decisions by the U.S. Solicitor General to successfully appeal a decision by the U.S. Fifth Circuit in RJ Reynolds v. FDA that blocked FDA's rule to require graphic warning labels on cigarette packs in the United States, and to appeal a decision by the U.S. District Court for the District of Columbia in Cigar Association of America v FDA that vacated the agency's ability to regulate premium cigars. In July 2024, at the request of FDA, the U.S. Supreme Court agreed to hear the agency's defense of its premarket application decisions denying authorization of certain flavored e-cigarettes in FDA v Wages and White Lion. On April 2, 2025, the U.S. Supreme Court ruled unanimously in FDA's favor. Additionally, in October 2024, the U.S. Supreme Court agreed to hear RJ Reynolds Vapor Co. v FDA, in which the FDA challenged the company's use of "forum shopping" by strategically choosing to file suit in a circuit that is likely to be more favorable to them (i.e. the Fifth Circuit, which has been criticized for rulings undermining public health) rather than the most appropriate venue based on federal statute (i.e. the DC Circuit).

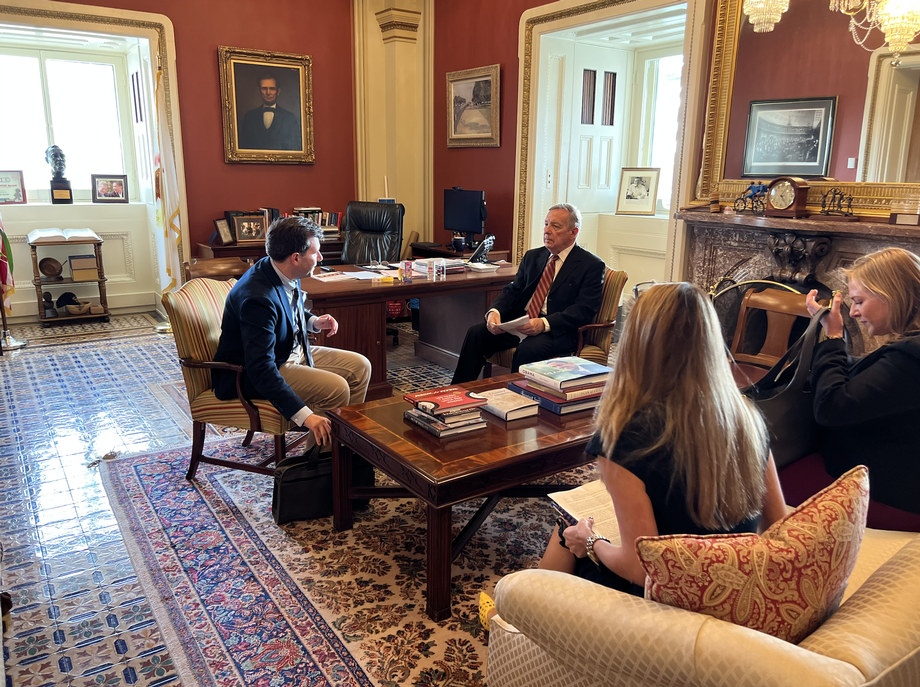
Dr. Brian King meets with U.S. Senator from Illinois and Senate Majority Whip, Dick Durbin, in 2022 at the U.S. Capitol.

During his time as CTP director, the center worked to finalize product standards to prohibit menthol in cigarettes and to prohibit all characterizing flavors in cigars, and to propose a rule to cap the maximum level of nicotine in cigarettes and certain other smoked tobacco products to nonaddictive or minimally addictive levels. The Biden administration chose not to proceed with the menthol and flavored cigars rules due to concerns that they could affect Biden's reelection prospects.

King also led the center to achieve several enforcement actions that were the first of their kind for the agency, including the issuance of the first injunctions, in coordination with the U.S. Department of Justice, filed against manufacturers for the sale of illegal e-cigarette products; the first civil money penalty complaints filed against e-cigarette manufacturers for the sale of illegal e-cigarette products; the agency's first marketing authorization decisions for menthol e-cigarettes, which were marketing denial orders for products by Logic that are presently under appeal by the company; the agency's first warning letters issued to retailers for selling illegal tobacco products since the agency's 2020 deadline for submission of premarket tobacco product applications; and the first judicial seizure of unauthorized e-cigarettes from a distributor in coordination with the U.S. Marshal's Service. In December 2023, King also oversaw the center's participation in a joint federal operation, in coordination with U.S. Customs and Border Protection, that resulted in the seizure of more than $18 million in illegal e-cigarettes at a cargo examination site at Los Angeles International Airport. Despite these activities, lawmakers remain critical of FDA's enforcement efforts. On June 12, 2024, King testified to the U.S. Senate Committee to the Judiciary, along with the U.S. Department of Justice. Earlier that week, both agencies announced the creation of a new interagency federal task force to address illicit e-cigarettes.

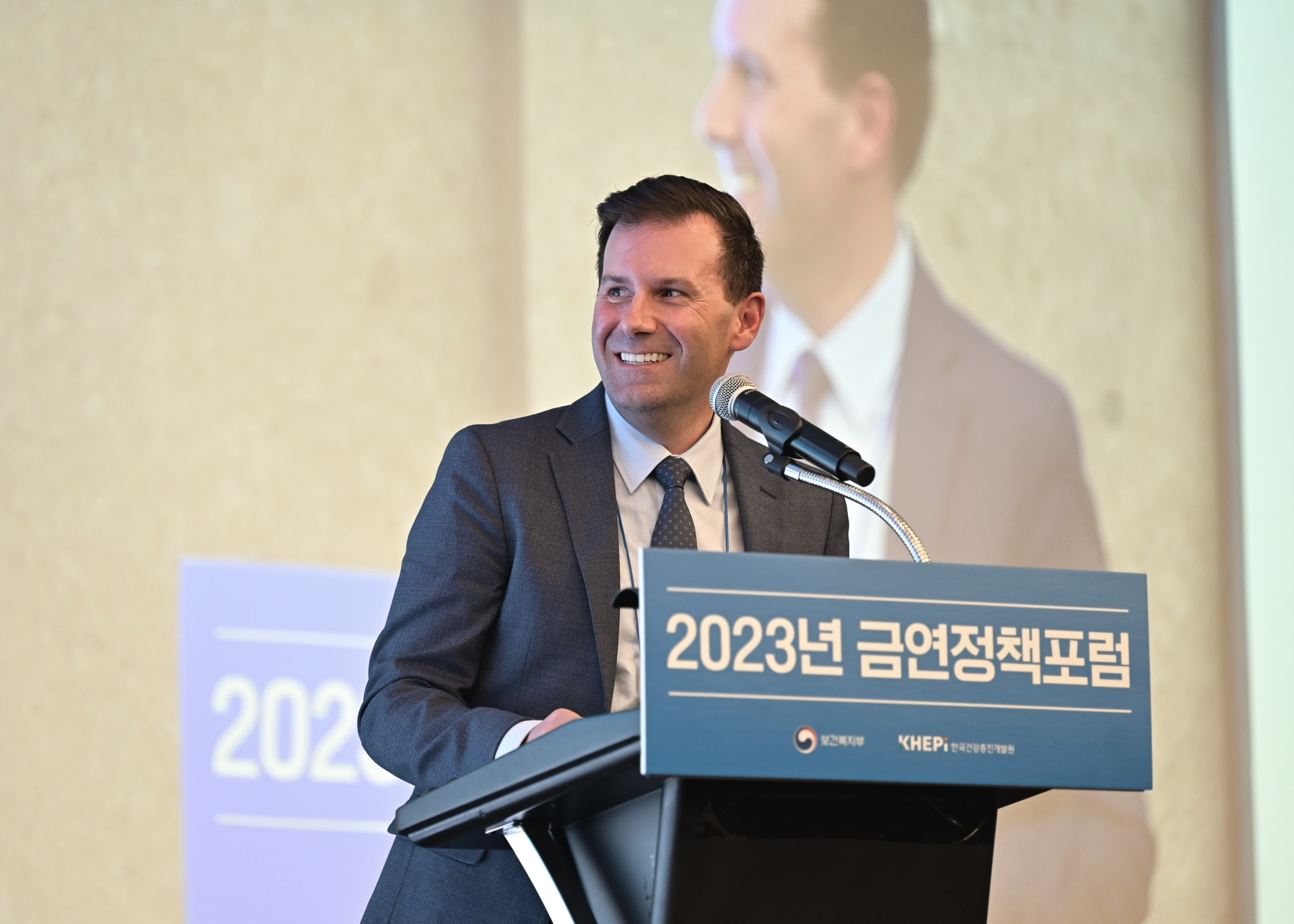
Dr. Brian King speaks to attendees of the 2nd Global Tobacco Control Policy Forum in February of 2023 hosted by the Ministry of Health and Welfare of South Korea in Seoul.

During King's tenure as director, the center completed acceptance review of 100% of the 1 million applications received for non-tobacco nicotine (e.g. synthetic nicotine) products following the April 2022 law clarifying FDA's authority to regulate the products. Despite resolving more than 99% of the nearly 27 million total applications received for tobacco and non-tobacco nicotine products, the center continues to receive criticism over its delays in reviewing all premarket tobacco product applications, including those court-ordered in American Academy of Pediatrics (AAP) v. FDA. King frequently reinforced that it takes time to ensure that the decisions are scientifically and legally defensible. He was also unapologetically blunt in response to critics of the agency's delay in review of the applications, stating the critiques are coming from the "cheap seats" and that the situation is "a very complex chess match, not a game of tic-tac-toe."

In addition to domestic tobacco regulatory activities, King also regularly engaged with international tobacco regulatory counterparts. In September 2023, he spoke at the 2nd Global Tobacco Control Policy Forum hosted by the Ministry of Health and Welfare of South Korea in Seoul, Korea. In February 2024, he was part of the U.S. Delegation to the 10th session of the Conference of the Parties to the World Health Organization's Framework Convention on Tobacco Control, which was held in Panama City, Panama.

==== Controversy surrounding departure from FDA ====
In February 2025, King was targeted by the American Accountability Foundation for his perceived support of diversity, equity, and inclusion initiatives. The conservative opposition research group placed King on their "DEI Watch List"; King's "DEI Offenses" included that he gave a talk on Martin Luther King Jr. Day highlighting the need to address the disproportionate burden of tobacco-related disease and death among African Americans. The DEI Watch List was largely decried as a tactic to intimidate career civil servants, with the executive director of the American Public Health Association calling it "half harassment, half intimidation."

On April 1, along with several other longstanding civil servant leadership across the Department of Health and Human Services, King was placed on administrative leave by the Trump administration and offered reassignment to the Indian Health Service. The reassignments offered were to remote medical clinics such as Alaska. Given that King is not a clinician, the reassignment was widely seen as a tactic to pressure him to resign given his longstanding efforts to reign in the tobacco industry, which donated heavily to the Trump campaign. RAI Services Co, a subsidiary of Reynolds American, was the biggest corporate donor to Trump's campaign and affiliated super PACs during the 2024 presidential race. Reynolds owns the companies that control well-known tobacco brands, including Newport, the top-selling menthol cigarette brand in the U.S., and Vuse, the top-selling e-cigarette brand in the U.S. During his tenure, King championed a ban on menthol cigarettes and FDA issued market denial orders for flavored Vuse e-cigarettes. In an e-mail to center staff telling them he had been placed on administrative leave, King stated: "I encourage you to hold your heads high and never compromise the guiding tenets that CTP has held dear since its inception. We obeyed the law. We followed the science. We told the truth."

On April 2, the U.S. Supreme Court ruled unanimously in FDA's favor in FDA v. Wages and White Lion, upholding the agency's approach to scientific review that led to the denied authorization of certain flavored e-cigarettes products. The court's decision was viewed by many as both ironic and timely vindication for King given that he advocated strongly for the approach during his leadership of the center.

On April 9, a former entry-level manager from the Center for Tobacco Product's stakeholder relations office criticized King in an interview with Fox News. The former FDA staffer, David Oliveira, has an apparent history of aggression towards government officials, including an alleged assault of a state lawmaker outside a youth basketball clinic. Oliveira's interview was criticized, even by those in the e-cigarette advocacy community to which he belongs.

On August 4, in a Fox News article, former senator Richard Burr (R-NC) took aim at King, falsely claiming that the center under King's leadership "not only didn't speak out against [illicit e-cigarettes], but they didn't make any attempt ... at enforcement." The article also cited a representative for King, who stated the allegation was "not consistent with the facts" and provided a list containing examples of several dozen enforcement actions taken and communicated to the public by FDA during 2023-2024 alone. The critique from Burr – who historically received substantive campaign contributions from the tobacco industry and now works as chair of the tobacco industry-funded "Coalition for Smarter Regulation of Nicotine" – was seen as ironic given that he consistently worked during his senate tenure to prevent FDA from obtaining necessary resources and authorities to address illicit e-cigarettes.

=== Campaign for Tobacco-Free Kids ===
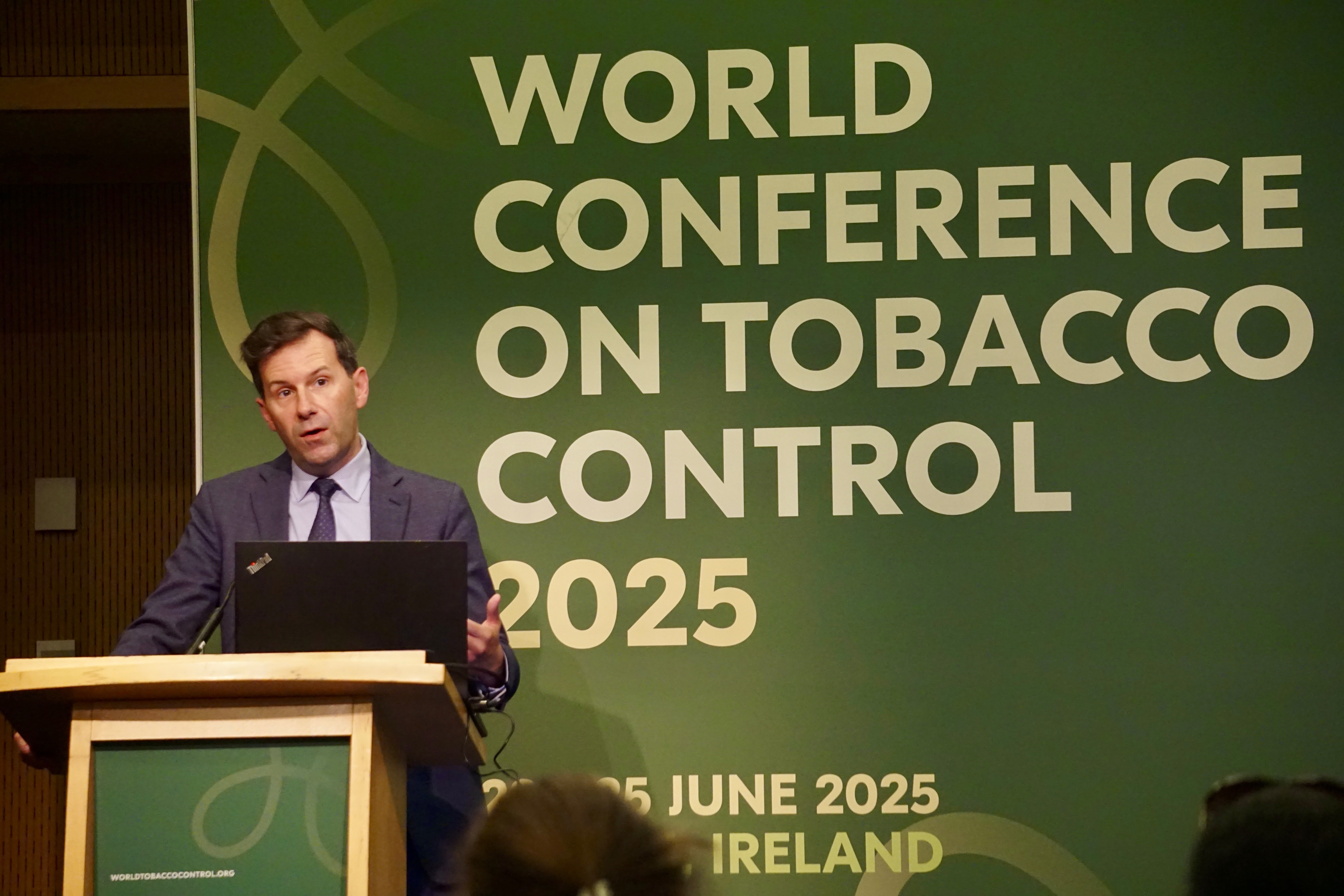
Dr. Brian King speaking at the 2025 World Conference on Tobacco Control (WCTC) in Dublin, Ireland.

On May 1, 2025, a matter of weeks after being pushed out of his FDA role, King was named the executive vice president of U.S. Programs at the Campaign for Tobacco-Free Kids, the leading advocacy organization to reduce tobacco use in the United States and around the world. His appointment was lauded by public health advocacy organizations and criticized by tobacco advocacy organizations. In this role, he speaks frequently to the media and at convenings across the country on issues related to tobacco prevention and control.

Under King's leadership, the Campaign for Tobacco-Free Kids has actively supported litigation protecting federal tobacco control staff. These efforts contributed to the reinstatement of most staff at the Center he formerly led at FDA, as well as the administrative retention of staff at the CDC's Office on Smoking and Health where he formerly served as a Deputy Director. The Campaign was also successful in ensuring Congress appropriated level funding for the Office on Smoking and Health in 2026, including distribution of grants to state tobacco control programs. In an environment of deregulatory actions at the federal level, the Campaign has also worked to successfully counter the tobacco industry and pass numerous tobacco control laws in states and communities across the country.

King has publicly criticized cuts to tobacco control by the U.S. Department of Health and Human Services under the leadership of Robert F. Kennedy Jr., who has been vocal about his intent to prioritize efforts to address chronic disease. In an interview with Politico, King said "Attempting to combat chronic disease without tobacco control is like attempting a triathlon without a bicycle. You're destined for failure before leaving the starting line."

King has also voiced concerns about the Administration’s efforts to loosen the tobacco regulatory posture of the FDA, which occurred after the tobacco industry made a multi-million dollar donation and attended a closed door meeting with President Trump at a Florida golf club in May 2026. After subsequent pressure on FDA by the President to take actions that were favorable to the tobacco industry, both the FDA Commissioner and a senior official at the Department of Health and Human Services resigned. At the time, King stated, "Political interference is the death knell of evidence-based regulation."

In August 2025, King spoke at the opening session of the National Conference on Tobacco or Health in Chicago, Illinois, after which he received a standing ovation from the crowd of more than 1,500 people in attendance.

In September 2025, King was named to the 2025 "Fierce 50" list, which celebrates influential individuals and organizations across healthcare, biopharma, and science, focusing on innovation, leadership, health equity, social impact, and breakthrough developments. He was honored as a "Social Impact" honoree for his work to prevent illness, death and the economic costs of smoking and tobacco use.

== Notable publications ==
- Califf, Robert M.; King, Brian A. (2023-01-17). "The Need for a Smoking Cessation "Care Package"". JAMA. 329 (3): 203–204. doi:10.1001/jama.2022.24398. ISSN 1538-3598. PMID 36580350. S2CID 255292817.
- King, BA (2020). "Flavors Are a Major Driver of the Youth E-Cigarette Epidemic". Am J Public Health. 110 (6): 773–774. doi:10.2105/AJPH.2020.305670. PMC 7204467. PMID 32374696.
- Kirkcaldy, RD; King, BA; Brooks, JT (2020). "COVID-19 and Postinfection Immunity: Limited Evidence, Many Remaining Questions". JAMA. 323 (22): 2245–2246. doi:10.1001/jama.2020.7869. PMC 8596300. PMID 32391855.
- King, BA; Jones, CM; Baldwin, GT; Briss, PA (2020). "The EVALI and Youth Vaping Epidemics - Implications for Public Health". N Engl J Med. 382 (8): 689–691. doi:10.1056/NEJMp1916171. PMC 7122126. PMID 31951683.
- King, BA; Gammon, DG; Marynak, KL; Rogers, T (2018). "Electronic Cigarette Sales in the United States, 2013-2017". JAMA. 320 (13): 1379–1380. doi:10.1001/jama.2018.10488. PMC 6233837. PMID 30285167.
- King, BA; Graffunder, C (2018). "The Tobacco Control Vaccine: a population-based framework for preventing tobacco-related disease and death". Tob Control. 27 (2): 123–124. doi:10.1136/tobaccocontrol-2018-054276. PMC 5850888. PMID 29475955.
- King, BA; Creamer, MR; Harrell, M; Kelder, S; Norman, L; Perry, CL (2018). "Surgeon General's Reports on Tobacco: A Continued Legacy of Unbiased and Rigorous Synthesis of the Scientific Evidence". Nicotine Tob Res. 20 (8): 1033–1036. doi:10.1093/ntr/ntx266. PMC 6023778. PMID 29300946.
- King, BA; Peck, RM; Babb, SD (2013). "Cost savings associated with prohibiting smoking in U.S. subsidized housing". Am J Prev Med. 44 (6): 631–4. doi:10.1016/j.amepre.2013.01.024. PMC 4572888. PMID 23683981.
- King, BA; Dube, SR; Tynan, MA (2012). "Current tobacco use among adults in the United States: findings from the National Adult Tobacco Survey". Am J Public Health. 102 (11): e93–e100. doi:10.2105/AJPH.2012.301002. PMC 3477973. PMID 22994278.
- King, BA; Travers, MJ; Cummings, KM; Mahoney, MC; Hyland, AJ (2010). "Secondhand smoke transfer in multiunit housing". Nicotine Tob Res. 12 (11): 1133–41. doi:10.1093/ntr/ntq162. PMC 3436457. PMID 20889473.

== Awards and honors ==
- 2025: Social Impact Honoree, Fierce Pharma
- 2020: Charles C. Shepard Award, Excellence in Assessment, U.S. Centers for Disease Control and Prevention
- 2016: George W. Thorn Award, UB Alumni Association, Status University of New York at Buffalo
- 2014: Alumni Inductee, Delta Omega Public Health Honor Society, Gamma Lambda Chapter, State University of New York at Buffalo
- 2010: Saxon Graham Award, School of Public Health and Health Related Professions, State University of New York at Buffalo
