= Torstein Hovig =

Norwegian pathologist

Torstein Hovig (3 January 1928 – 14 February 2015) was a Norwegian pathologist.

He took the cand.med. degree at the University of Oslo in 1954 and the dr.med. degree in 1965. He worked at Rikshospitalet from 1967, was promoted to docent in 1973 and professor in 1985.

Since 1993 he was a fellow of the Norwegian Academy of Science and Letters. Hovig was also a board member of the Norwegian Medical Association and the Norwegian Junior Doctors Association.

He resided at Haslum. He died from cancer in February 2015.
