= American Academy of Pediatrics =

American professional association

- Formation: 1930; 96 years ago
- Type: Professional association
- Headquarters: Itasca, Illinois, United States
- Coordinates: 42.0366°N 87.9827°W
- Members: 67,000
- Official language: English
- AAP President: Andrew Racine, MD, FAAP
- Staff: 390
- Website: www.aap.org

The American Academy of Pediatrics (AAP) is the largest professional association of pediatricians in the United States. It is headquartered in Itasca, Illinois, and maintains an office in Washington, D.C. The AAP has published hundreds of policy statements, ranging from advocacy issues to practice recommendations.

== Background ==
The Academy was founded in 1930 by 35 pediatricians to address pediatric healthcare standards. As of 2022, it has 67,000 members in primary care and sub-specialist areas. Qualified pediatricians can become fellows (FAAP). The Academy runs continuing medical education (CME) programs for pediatricians and sub-specialists. The Academy is divided into 14 departments and 26 divisions.

=== Publications ===
It has the largest pediatric publishing program in the world, with more than 300 titles for consumers and over 500 titles for physicians and other healthcare professionals. These publications include electronic products, professional references, medical textbooks, practice management publications, patient education materials, and parenting books. The AAP News is the academy's official news magazine, and Pediatrics is its flagship journal.

The AAP issues a weekly report on COVID-19 cases in the United States. States began reporting COVID-19 cases on September 17, 2020. The AAP tracked 587,948 child COVID-19 cases, 5,016 child hospitalizations, and 109 child deaths.

== The Julius B. Richmond Center ==
In 2006, the Academy received a grant from the Flight Attendant Medical Research Institute (FAMRI) to plan and establish a Center of Excellence dedicated to the elimination of children's exposure to tobacco and secondhand smoke. The Richmond Center was established to help institutionalize pediatric tobacco control activities at AAP and was named in honor of Julius B. Richmond, MD, Chair of the FAMRI Medical Advisory Board and former Surgeon General of the United States Public Health Service. The Center provides the education, training, and tools needed to protect children from tobacco and secondhand smoke.

== Policy positions ==
The Academy has published hundreds of policy statements, ranging from advocacy issues to practice recommendations. The academy's policy website contains all current Academy policies and clinical reports. The AAP policy regarding its statements is to give each statement a five-year life, after which the statement expires unless it is reaffirmed.

=== Abortion ===
The AAP is supportive of abortion rights and criticized the overturning of Roe v. Wade (1973). In June 2022, they stated that adolescents "should have the right to receive legal and confidential medical and surgical abortion care and counseling" and that "[Dobbs v. Jackson (2022)] means that in many places in the United States, this evidence-based care will be difficult or impossible to access, threatening the health and safety of our patients and jeopardizing the patient-physician relationship".

=== Age limit ===
The AAP has changed positions on its age limit throughout the years. In 1988, the American Academy of Pediatrics published a statement on the age limit of pediatrics that identified the upper age limit of pediatrics as age 21. The policy had a note that exceptions could always be made when the doctor and family jointly agree to an older age.

Recent studies have shown that the age of 21 years is just an arbitrary line for adolescence, because brain development does not fully reach adult levels of functioning until the early 30s. In a 2017 policy update, AAP changed its policy to discourage age limits of pediatric providers and instead have families reach an agreement with their pediatric provider as to when to transition care.

=== Asthma ===
In 2009, the national office and four of its State chapters provided training support to 49 pediatric practices to improve adherence to well-established asthma care guidelines. The percentage of patients at participating practices with well-controlled asthma (as defined by the National Heart, Lung, and Blood Institute) rose from 58 to 72 percent.

=== Car safety seats ===
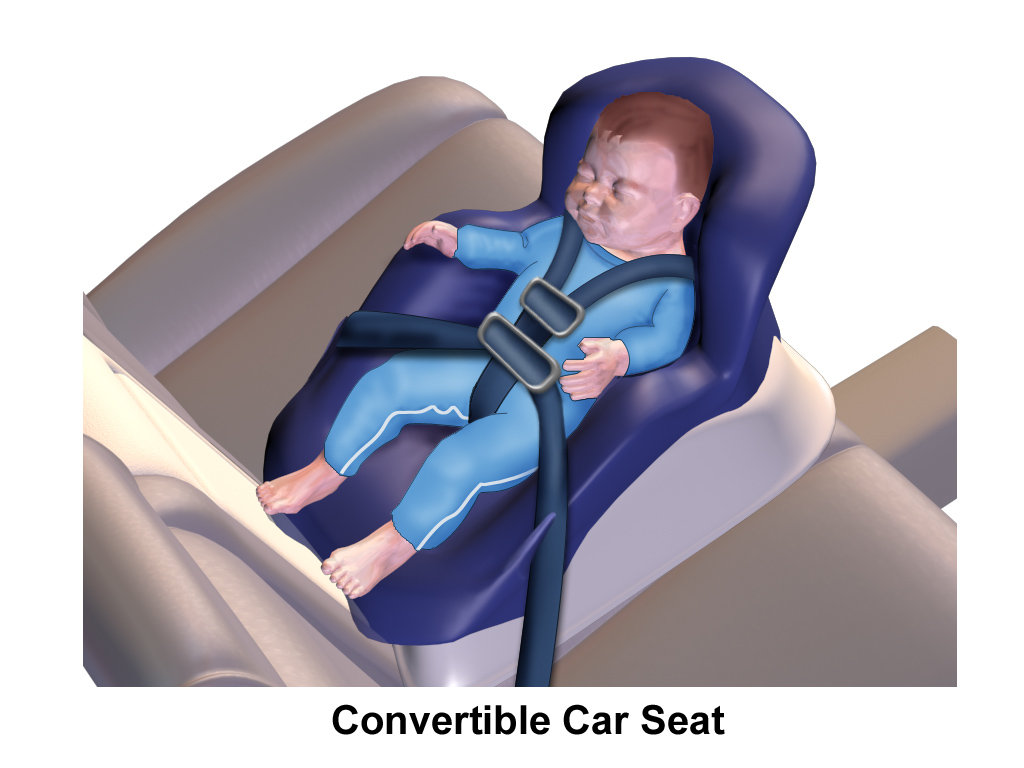
In 2018, the AAP began recommending that children be placed in rear-facing car seats until the child reached the maximum height or weight for the car seat, regardless of the child's age.

The AAP periodically issues guidance for child passenger safety, including policy recommendations for transitioning between rear-facing car seats, front-facing car seats, belt-positioning booster seats, and vehicle safety belts. These recommendations are typically published in the peer-reviewed scientific journal Pediatrics.

Previously, the AAP recommended that children remain rear-facing until they are two years of age. In response to updated crash test, simulation, and field data, the AAP revised their guidance to exclude the age guideline entirely. Current AAP Child Passenger Safety recommendations (as of February 12, 2026) state that children should remain in a rear-facing car seat for as long as possible, until they meet the maximum height or weight dictated by the car seat manufacturer. Once children have outgrow the rear-facing seat recommendations, they are required to use a forward-facing car seat with a harness, while also complying to the same requirements for the maximum height and weight for the seat based on the manufacturer. Same requirements apply when transitioning to the booster seat, where they should properly use the seat belts with the booster seat until the seat belts lap and shoulder straps sit correctly. A child should be seated in the back seats for optimal protection until they turn 13 years old. These requirements are based on the latest evidence of child safety related to seatbelts, and it is crucial that parents follow these regulations in order for optimal safety for their child.

=== COVID schooling in person ===
On June 29, 2020, AAP stated that it "strongly advocates that all policy considerations for the coming school year should start with a goal of having students physically present in school" as remote learning during the COVID-19 pandemic in the United States made it more difficult for education professionals to notice learning deficits, physical and sexual abuse, depression and suicidal ideation. The AAP argued that masks are probably not practical for children younger than middle school unless they can wear a mask without increased face touching. Teachers' unions opposed the AAP statement, however, saying "Our educators are overwhelmingly not comfortable returning to schools ... They fear for their lives, the lives of their students and the lives of their families." Two weeks later, the AAP walked back its support, under political pressure from teachers and other groups. Then-president Donald Trump cited AAP's original statement repeatedly, pressuring school leaders to reopen schools.

=== Digital advertising to children ===
In its 2020 statement in Pediatrics, the AAP called for banning all digital advertising that was targeted to children under the age of 7 and urged limits to advertising aimed at people under 17. This aimed to protect kids from digital tracking on social media, TV and video games.

=== Elective infant circumcision ===
Because the AAP's 2012 statement expired after five years without being reaffirmed, the AAP has not had any official position on circumcision since August of 2017, and as of 2025 they remain silent on the issue. In their prior 2012 position statement, the academy had stated that a systematic evaluation of the medical literature showed that the "preventive health benefits of elective circumcision of male newborns outweigh the risks of the procedure" and that the health benefits "are sufficient to justify access to this procedure for families choosing it and to warrant third-party payment for circumcision of male newborns", but "are not great enough to recommend routine circumcision for all male newborns". The academy previously took the position that parents should make the final decision about circumcision after appropriate information is gathered about the risks and benefits of the procedure.

=== Electronic nicotine delivery systems ===
Electronic nicotine delivery systems (electronic cigarettes, e-hookahs, vape pens, others) are highly addictive and often candy-flavored products that are rapidly rising in popularity among middle and high school students, and appear to be serving as a gateway to other forms of tobacco, and threaten to addict a new generation to nicotine.

=== Gun violence ===
The American Academy of Pediatrics says that although firearms-related deaths in the US have dropped since the 1990s, guns were used in more than 80 percent of teen homicides in 2009 and were the most common suicide method among US teens. The AAP believes pediatricians should discuss guns and gun safety with parents before babies are born and at children's annual exams. It also advocates for, among other things, more background checks, an assault weapons ban, and more federal research on gun violence.

=== Marijuana ===
The AAP warns of possible marijuana damage to children and adolescents. In states that have already legalized marijuana, the Academy recommends that pediatricians and regulators treat it as they would tobacco. The Academy supports "decriminalization" of marijuana (reductions in the penalties for its use and possession) in combination with an increased commitment to substance-abuse treatment. The Academy recommends changing marijuana from a DEA Schedule I to a DEA Schedule II to facilitate research into pharmaceutical uses.

=== School start times for adolescents ===
Recognizing that insufficient sleep in adolescents is an important public health issue that significantly affects the health and safety, as well as academic success, the American Academy of Pediatrics strongly supports efforts of school districts to optimize sleep in students and urges high schools and middle schools to aim for start times no earlier than 8:30 a.m., to allow students the opportunity to achieve optimal levels of sleep (8.5–9.5 hours) and to improve physical and mental health, safety, academic performance, and quality of life. Although the AAP acknowledges that numerous factors may impair the amount and/or quality of sleep in adolescents—among them, biological changes in sleep associated with puberty, lifestyle choices, and academic demands—it considers school start times before 8:30 a.m. ("earlier school start times") to be a key modifiable contributor to insufficient sleep, together with circadian rhythm disruption. It also recognizes that a substantial body of research has demonstrated that delaying the start of the school day is an effective countermeasure to chronic sleep loss and has a wide range of potential benefits to the physical and mental health, safety, and academic achievement of students—including reduced obesity risk, rates of depression, and drowsy driving crashes as well as improved academic performance and quality of life. Later start times also result in less frequent tardiness.

=== Abusive head trauma ===
There is limited medical controversy surrounded the AAP regarding abusive head trauma (AHT), also called shaken baby syndrome in infants. The current skepticism is not whether violent shaking or shaking with slamming is dangerous to infants and children, but of how the scientific information is used in the legal processes. The AAP updated its policy paper in 2020. In the updated policy paper, the APP states "The AAP continues to affirm the dangers and harms of shaking infants, continues to embrace the 'shaken baby syndrome' diagnosis as a valid subset of the AHT diagnosis, and encourages pediatric practitioners to educate community stakeholders when necessary."

=== Statins for high cholesterol in children ===
In 2008, the AAP and the American Heart Association recommended statins for children as young as eight years with high lipid concentrations and for children as young as two years with major cardiovascular risk factors, if weight management, dietary changes, and additional physical exercise were not sufficient to reduce the risk of heart disease. The organizations were criticized by bloggers and the editorial board of The New York Times, who expressed "fear that it will open the way for drug companies to bombard anxious parents with ads promoting these and other products and increase the number of parents insisting on prescriptions for their children. The ease of popping pills should not distract parents, health professionals, or policy makers from the more arduous tasks of cutting back on junk foods, promoting healthy diets, and putting physical education back into the schools."

=== Tobacco ===
AAP recommends that tobacco control programs should change the image of tobacco by telling the truth about the substance. This includes prohibiting tobacco advertising and promotion that is accessible to children, as well as point of sale advertising, product placements in movies and other entertainment media, and promotion in print or internet-based media accessible to youth. Advertising and promotion has been shown to be a cause of tobacco use initiation in adolescents.

AAP supports a minimum purchasing age of 21 years for tobacco products. Increasing age of purchase has been shown to decrease youth smoking rates. Younger age of starting tobacco use leads to lower rates of ever stopping tobacco use.

=== Trans rights ===
According to Block (2023), the AAP and other American medical professional groups have becoming increasingly aligned in supporting gender affirming care for gender dysphoria, which may include gonadotrophin releasing hormone analogues (GnRHa) to suppress puberty; oestrogen or testosterone to promote secondary sex characteristics; and surgical removal or augmentation of breasts, genitals, or other physical features.

In 2018, the AAP issued a policy statement putting forward a model of gender affirmative care, by Dr Jason Rafferty, noting that "Dr Rafferty conceptualized the statement, drafted the initial manuscript, reviewed and revised the manuscript, approved the final manuscript as submitted, and agrees to be accountable for all aspects of the work". Dr. Rafferty defines gender affirmative care as based on the idea that transgender identities and diverse gender expressions do not constitute a mental disorder, that variations in gender identity and expression are normal aspects of human diversity, and binary definitions of gender do not always reflect emerging gender identities, that gender identity evolves as an interplay of biology, development, socialization, and culture, and that if a mental health issue exists, that mental health issue most often stems from stigma and negative experiences rather than being intrinsic to the child.

In 2023, the AAP issued a further policy statement reiterating the Board's confidence in the 2018 policy, while authorizing its first systematic review of evidence. According to the statement "the AAP will invite members and other stakeholders to share input" in the interests of transparency and inclusivity. Neither that call for input nor any research protocol has been published by the AAP since that date (as of January 5, 2026).

The AAP describe conversion therapy as "unsuccessful", "deleterious" and "outside the mainstream of traditional medical practice". Finally, the AAP recommends that youth identifying as transgender have access to comprehensive and development-appropriate healthcare provided in safe and inclusive clinics but also that family based therapy be available. The AAP also recommend that the medical field and federal government prioritize research that is dedicated to improving the quality of evidence-based care for transgender youth.

The AAP supports allowing transgender athletes to compete in sports that align with their gender identity and considers attempts to ban trans athletes from sports to be harmful to their mental and physical health as well as discrimination.

== Programs ==
=== Brush, Book, Bed ===
Brush, Book, Bed (BBB) is an American Academy of Pediatrics program aimed at improving children's health by creating a nighttime routine of brushing the child's teeth, reading together, and setting a bedtime. It was developed to help pediatricians communicate a simple message to families.

== See also ==
- American Pediatric Society
- Academic Pediatric Association
- European Academy of Paediatrics
- Society for Pediatric Research
- Sheppard–Towner Act
