= Rolf Schøyen =

Norwegian physician and medical microbiologist

Rolf Schøyen (born 30 March 1936 in Tønsberg) is a Norwegian physician and medical microbiologist. He was President of the Norwegian Association of Senior Hospital Physicians from 1988 to 1991 and a member of the executive board of the Norwegian Medical Association during the same term. He was also Chairman of the Norwegian specialty committee for medical microbiology 1986–1989. He was President of the Association of Older Physicians for six years until 2015.

He graduated as cand.med. at the University of Oslo in 1961 and became a specialist in medical microbiology in 1970. After serving as a military doctor in the Royal Norwegian Navy 1964–1965, he joined the Norwegian Institute of Public Health. In 1969 he joined the microbiological department at Ullevål Hospital. He became senior consultant and medical director at the microbiological department at Vestfold Hospital in 1972.

He is author of the textbook Mikroorganismer og sykdom and several articles.

== Bibliography ==
- Mikroorganismer og sykdom, Gyldendal Norsk Forlag Akademisk, 2011, ISBN 9788205405622
