= Norwegian Association of Senior Hospital Physicians =

The Norwegian Association of Senior Hospital Physicians (Norwegian: Norsk overlegeforening) is a Norwegian medical association and trade union. It is one of the largest associations within the Norwegian Medical Association and mainly organises consultants at hospitals. It is thus a parallel to the Norwegian Junior Doctors Association which mainly organises residents. The Norwegian Association of Senior Hospital Physicians was founded on 15 February 1961 and its first president was Johan Haffner, who later also became president of the Norwegian Medical Association. It publishes the magazine Overlegen ("The Consultant").
