= Bryan King =

Bryan King may refer to:

- Bryan King (Australian footballer) (born 1935), Australian rules footballer
- Bryan King (footballer, born 1947), English footballer
- Bryan King (politician) (born 1968), member of the Arkansas Senate
- Bryan King (baseball) (born 1996), American baseball player

== See also ==
- Brian King (disambiguation)
