= European Academy of Paediatrics =

- Formation: 1961
- Type: Medical society
- Location: Europe
- President: Berthold Koletzko
- Website: eapaediatrics.eu

The European Academy of Paediatrics is a European professional association for pediatricians, and acts as the pediatrics branch of the European Union of Medical Specialists. It was founded in 1961, holding its first meeting in Siena, Italy.

The current President of the academy is German Professor, Berthold Koletzko.

== Member societies ==
Affiliated societies

- European Society of Paediatric neonatal and Intensive Care
- European Society of Paediatric Radiology
- European Scientific Working group on Influenza
- Permanent Working Group of European Junior Doctors
- European Confederation of Primary Care Pediatricians (ECPCP)
- European Society for Paediatric Infectious Diseases
- European Association for Paediatric Education
- European Society for Neonatology
- Berufsverbands der Kinder – und Jugendärzte

National societies

- Öster Ges. für Kinder und Jugendheilkunde
- Belgian Society of Pediatrics
- Association Bulgare de Pédiatrie
- Croatian society of paediatric cardiology and rheumatology
- Cyprus Pediatric Society
- Czech Pediatric Society
- Danish Paediatric Society
- Estonian Pediatric Association
- Finnish Pediatric Association
- French society of paediatrics
- Georgian Pediatric Association
- Deutsche Gesellschaft für Kinder- und Jugendmedizin
- Hellenic Paediatric Association
- Hungarian Pediatric Association
- Icelandic Pediatric Association
- Royal College of Physicians of Ireland
- Società Italiana di Pediatria
- Lithuanian Paediatric Association
- Société Luxembourgeoise de Pédiatrie
- Pediatric Society of Macedonia
- Pediatric Association of the Netherlands
- Norwegian Society of Pediatricians
- Polskie Towarzystwo Pediatryczne
- Sociedade Portuguesa de Pediatria
- Société Roumaine de Pédiatrie
- Slovenia Paediatric Society
- Slovak Pediatric Society
- Asociacion Espanola de Pédiatria
- Swedish Paediatric Society
- Swiss Paediatric Society
- Turkish National Pediatric Society
- Royal College of Paediatrics and Child Health

== Presidents ==
- J. van Espen (Belgium), 1964–1971
- W. van Zeben (The Netherlands), 1977–1980
- G. van den Berghe (Belgium), 1987–1988
- R. Kurz (Austria), 1997–1998
- Peter Hoyer (Germany), 2005–2007
- Max Zach (Austria), 2007–2009
- Patricia Hamilton (UK), 2009–2011
- Alfred Tenore (Italy), 2011–2013
- Tom Stiris (Norway), 2013–2018
- Adamos Hadjipanayis (Cyprus), 2019 - 2023
- Berthold Koletzko (Germany) 2023 - current
