= Torstein Lyberg =

Norwegian surgeon (1947–2021)

- Born: 2 June 1947
- Died: 12 October 2021 (aged 74)
- Scientific career
- Fields: Maxillofacial surgery
- Institutions: Oslo University Hospital

Torstein Lyberg (2 June 1947 – 12 October 2021) was a Norwegian maxillofacial surgeon and medical researcher. He was a research director at Oslo University Hospital and authored around 300 papers in medical journals. According to Google Scholar he is cited around 12,000 times in scientific literature and has an h-index of 60. He was described in the Journal of the Norwegian Medical Association as "one of the giants of Norwegian maxillofacial surgery and research."

== Career ==
He graduated as a dentist in 1971 and as a physician in 1975, and earned the dr.med. research doctorate in 1984. He became head of maxillofacial surgery at Ullevål University Hospital in the same year. He introduced modern craniofacial surgery in Norway, as well as several other new treatment methods. From 1992 he worked with research full-time as research director at Ullevål University Hospital, and published around 300 research articles, mainly on the cell biology of thromboplastin, coagulation, fibrinolysis, thrombosis mechanisms, septic shock, experimental surgery and jaw surgery topics. He received Ullevål's prize for outstanding research in 1992. He turned down professorships at the University of Oslo due to the associated teaching requirement, to continue with research full time.
