= European Society for Paediatric Infectious Diseases =

Medical society in West Lothian, Scotland, UK

The European Society for Paediatric Infectious Diseases (ESPID) is a non-profit medical association registered in Germany that focuses on paediatric infectious diseases. Since its founding in 1983, it has grown to include over 2300 members. The majority (77% in 2025) were from Europe, the remainder from Asia, Americas, Oceania and Africa. ESPID forms the basis for clinicians and scientists interested in all aspects of infectious diseases in children and their prevention. The society is engaged in a number of activities including the organization of multicentre trials, international exchange of paediatric infectious disease fellows, educational activities, and an annual scientific conference.

== Mission ==
ESPID promotes "excellence in paediatric infectious diseases and child health."

== Activities ==
ESPID offers several grants and fellowship awards to facilitate information exchange, education, and research in the field of paediatric infectious diseases. The exact scope of each of these awards varies. The Small Grant Award and the Young Investigator Award fund individual research projects. The former focuses on projects designed to acquire preliminary data, while the latter funds researchers under 40 years of age. ESPID also supports research through its Collaborative Research Meeting Scheme, which funds projects conducted by members of more than one European nation. ESPID funds two sets of fellowship awards. The ESPID Fellowships Awards provide funding for basic research or clinical research.

More recently further awards have been introduced to its members and the full list of awards available are:

- Fellowship Award
- General Travel Award
- Postgraduate Teaching Visits to Resource Poor Countries
- Small Grant Award
- Training Course and Workshop Award
- Clinical Training Fellowship
- Young Investigator Award
- Collaborative Research Meeting Award
- ESPID Annual Meeting Travel Award
- Research Training Fellowship
- ESPID/INOPSU Infection Surveillance Research Grant
- ESPID-PIDJ Award
- ESPID Supported Speaker Award

The criteria for each award is reviewed regularly and further updated information can be found at www.espid.org/awards.aspx?Group=awards

The association also supports projects designed to educate medical professionals. It funds training sessions for clinical trainees and continuing medical education for qualified physicians with its Training Course and Workshop Award. Additionally, the ESPID Postgraduate Teaching Visits to Resource Poor Countries encourages members to teach paediatric infectious disease techniques in countries with low or lower-middle income.

The ESPID Annual Meeting, held every year since 1983, consists of various workshops, lectures, and symposia to help healthcare professionals learn the latest scientific information about the diagnosis, treatment, and prevention of paediatric infectious diseases. The meeting is organized jointly with the ESPID Foundation. ESPID also hosts regional training sessions and educational workshops in various European countries. ESPID Travel awards are available to allow members to travel both to the Annual Meeting and to relevant scientific congresses in general, ESPID Lectures and presentations are often recorded by ESPID for use on the association's website. The site currently has presentations available for members

== Publications ==
The Pediatric Infectious Disease Journal is the official journal of ESPID. The Pediatric Infectious Disease Journal is published monthly and offers original studies and case reports, peer reviews of articles, different perspectives on pediatric practices, and updated information on drugs, treatments, and diseases. It is published by Lippincott Williams & Wilkins

== Governance ==
The current ESPID Board consists of the following members:

President: Adilia Warris, Term of office 2025 - 2028

Secretary: Nicole Ritz, Term of office 2025 - 2028

Treasurer: Cihan Papan, Term of office 2023 - 2026

Board Member: Dana Danino, Term of office 2025 - 2028

Board Member: Simon Drysdale, Term of office: 2024 - 2027

Board Member: Olaf Neth, Term of office 2023 - 2026

Young ESPID Representative: Eleni Vergadi, Term of office 2023 - 2026

Young ESPID Representative: Danilo Buonsenso, Term of office 2024 - 2027

The current ESPID committees consist of the following members:

Committee for Scientific Affairs & Awards (CSAA)

Committee Chair: Lilliam Ambroggio, Term of office 2024-2027

Committee Member - Board Representative: Simon Drysdale, Term of office 2024-2027

Committee Member: Richard Malley, Term of office 2024-2027

Committee Member: Bridget Freyne, Term of office 2024-2027

Committee Member: Patrick Meyer Sauteur, Term of office 2023-2026

Young ESPID Representative: Kevin Meesters, Term of office 2025-2028

Young ESPID Representative: Ergenc Zeynep, Term of office 2025-2028

Committee for Research (CfR)

Committee Chair: Ulrich von Both, Term of office 2023-2024

Committee Member - Board Representative: Dana Danino, Term of office 2025-2028

Committee Member: Flor Munoz-Rivas, Term of office 2023-2026

Committee Member: Marieke Emonts, Term of office 2023-2026

Committee Member: David Burgner, Term of office 2023-2026

Committee Member: Jethro Herberg, Term of office 2023-2026

Committee Member: Marieke van der Zalm, Term of office 2024-2027

Young ESPID Representative: Annalie Shears, Term of office 2024-2027

Young Espid Representative: Ourania Kolliniati, Term of office 2023-2026

Committee for Education (CfE)

Committee Chair: Michael Buettcher, Term of office 2024-2027

Committee Member - Board Representative: Olaf Neth, Term of office 2023-2026

Committee Member: Sarah Prentice, Term of office 2024-2027

Committee Member: Anu Goenku, Term of office 2025-2028

Committee Member: Petra Zimmerman, Term of office 2024-2027

Committee Member: Ilias Iosifidis, Term of office 2024-2027

Committee Member: Despoina Gkentzi, Term of office 2024-2027

Committee Member: Ceri Evans, Term of office 2023-2026

Committee Member: Karen McCarthy, Term of office 2023-2026

Committee Member: Anna Stanzelova, Term of office 2023-2026

Young ESPID Representative: Jorge Rodrigues, Term of office 2023-2026

Young ESPID Representative: Petar Velikov, Term of office 2023-2026

Committee for Sustainability (CfS)

Committee Chair: Pablo Rojo, Term of office 2023-2026

Committee Member - Board Representative: Simon Drysdale, Term of office 2024-2027

Committee Member: Ina Beeretz, Term of office 2023-2026

Committee Member: Christina Karastathi, Term of office 2023-2026

Committee Member: Maria Kourti, Term of office 2023-2026

Young ESPID Representative: Nina Schobi, Term of office 2023-2026

Committee for Guidelines (CfG)

Committee Chair: Nigel Curtis, term of office 2025-2026

Committee Member - Board Representative: Dana Danino, term of office 2025-2028

Committee Member: Amanda Gwee, term of office 2025-2026

Committee Member: John Kopsidas, term of office 2025-2026

Committee Member: Liat Ashkenazi-Hoffnung, term of office 2025-2028

Young ESPID Representative: Deirdre Foley, term of office 2022-2025

Young ESPID Representative: Rumeysa Yalcinkaya, term of office 2025-2028

Young ESPID Representative: Malik Aydin, term of office 2025-2028

== See also ==
- European Society of Clinical Microbiology and Infectious Diseases
- Pediatrics
- Infectious disease
