= Murder of Brian King =

Officer of the Royal Canadian Mounted Police

Thomas Brian King
- Born: March 29, 1938
- Died: April 25, 1978 (aged 40); Saskatoon, Saskatchewan
- Cause of death: two shots to the head
- Occupation: Constable of the Royal Canadian Mounted Police
- Years active: 1971–1978

Thomas Brian King (March 29, 1938 – April 25, 1978) was a constable of the Royal Canadian Mounted Police in Saskatoon, Saskatchewan, who was ambushed, overpowered, tortured, and shot to death by local high school students Darrell Crook and Gregory Fischer in 1978.

== Background ==
On the afternoon of April 24, 1978, Gregory Fischer and Darrell Crook were in Lloydminster dealing with an income tax form and while there they impulsively decided to kill a police officer. It did not matter to them who it would be or from which police agency. They told friends that they were going to "get a cop". None of their friends took them seriously and therefore no police departments were warned. Fischer and Crook removed the licence plate and broke a tail light on Fischer's 1964 Rambler. This was the bait.

== Murder ==
On the evening of the incident, King was on duty in Warman, Saskatchewan. Constable Doug Rushlow (RCMP Saskatoon detachment) was also on duty that night. As the evening became dark the two officers decided that they would both drive their two cruisers to the RCMP station on 8th street where they would team up for the remainder of their shift. Both police cruisers were driving south along Idylwyld Drive on the outskirts of the north end of the city. Ruslow was some distance in front of King.

At Idylwyld Drive and 51st Street, Ruslow radioed King (who was down the road behind him) that he was about to pull over a vehicle. King was approximately 1/4 mile away and indicated that he too was about to stop a vehicle. It was Fischer's Rambler with a broken tail light and no plate.

As King was pulling the Rambler over, Crook threw a half-filled beer bottle out the window and into the ditch. King got out of his car and walked into the ditch to retrieve the 'exhibit'. As he got in the ditch Fischer jumped him. During the struggle Crook managed to relieve King of his .38 revolver. During the fight to retain his weapon, King managed to open the cylinder enough to allow three rounds to fall out, but three still remained. Once Crook had the weapon, he fired one round in the air. They were now in control. Rushlow heard the shot in the distance as he talked to the man he pulled over, but thought someone's car had backfired. He could see King's RCMP cruiser and Fischer's Rambler some distance away, but had no reason to believe anything was wrong. At the same time, Saskatoon Police K-9 officer CST. Glenn Thomson passed King's traffic stop and had a passing glance, also finding no reason to believe anything was wrong.

Overpowered and disarmed, King was handcuffed behind his back and forced into the trunk of Fischer's Rambler. They drove away and left the cruiser running with its lights still flashing. Rushlow, upon clearing his traffic stop, turned around and drove to King's cruiser, where he did not see anyone around. Fischer and Crook drove to a few bars to show King to their friends and tell them of their intentions as they beat and tormented him. The friends told them that they wanted nothing to do with the situation. Fischer and Crook then drove down Spadina Crescent, through downtown and to the Queen Elizabeth Power Station. Once there, King was removed from the car, walked down to the South Saskatchewan River, and executed with two shots to the head by Fischer. His body was then mutilated and dumped in the river, after which Fischer and Crook returned to the city.

At this time, Rushlow suspected something was wrong. The only description of the suspect's vehicle was from Constable Thompson. As RCMP and Saskatoon Police were on alert for the Rambler, suspecting the occupants had something to do with the abandoned cruiser, Saskatoon Police constables Jim Bracken and Rick Penny gave chase to a car fitting the description. After a short chase, Bracken chased Fischer down an alley on foot off of Avenue G and 21st Street, managing to tackle and detain him. As Penny and Bracken helped Fischer to his feet, they noticed that he was covered in blood. Fischer then told the full story and took them to where they had dumped the body. A few hours later, Crook was arrested at a roadblock at 51st Street and Idylwyld Drive.

In 2011, Gregory Fischer was arrested by the Warman RCMP for impaired driving, on Highway 7 near Saskatoon. Fischer is on lifetime parole and was returned to prison for 2 years.

== See also ==
- List of kidnappings: 1950–1979
