= Werner Kutzsche =

Werner Kutzsche (14 May 1911 – 1 February 2000) was a German engineer, who was known for his work in the fields of radio-frequency engineering and electroacoustics.

Kutzsche was born in Niederlößnitz near Radebeul. He was Professor and Director of the Institute for radio-frequency engineering and electroacoustics at the Hochschule für Elektrotechnik Ilmenau from 1957 and 1958, respectively, and Professor of information technology at the same institution from 1969.

He received an honorary doctorate at the Hochschule für Verkehrswesen in 1966, received the National Prize of East Germany in 1968, became a corresponding member of the Academy of Sciences of the GDR in 1974 and received the Humboldt Medal in Gold in 1976. He died in Dresden, aged 88.
