= Ingunn Rise Kirkeby =

Norwegian handball player (born 1961)

- Born: 27 May 1961 (age 65)
- Other name: Ingunn R. Rise
- Education: University of Oslo
- Scientific career
- Fields: Neurosurgery
- Workplaces: Oslo University Hospital
- Thesis: Cerebral blood flow during high intracranial pressure and blood loss (1999)

Ingunn Ragnhild Rise Kirkeby (born 27 May 1961), formerly Ingunn R. Rise, is a Norwegian neurosurgeon, medical researcher and former handball player who played on the Norwegian national team in the early 1980s.

== Neurosurgery ==
She graduated as a medical doctor in 1986. She is a specialist in neurosurgery and earned her PhD degree in neurosurgery at the University of Oslo in 1999, with the dissertation Cerebral blood flow during high intracranial pressure and blood loss. She works as a consultant neurosurgeon at Oslo University Hospital and has published several papers in medical journals. As a researcher she has often collaborated with her current husband, neurosurgeon Ole Jørgen Kirkeby, who was also her doctoral advisor. In 2001 she was appointed by the King-in-Council as a member of a government committee overseeing combat sport.

== Handball ==
Ingunn Rise Kirkeby
Sport
- Sport: Handball

Senior clubs
- Years: Team
- –: Os TF
- 1982–1990: IL Vestar
National team
Years	Team	Apps	(Gls)
1980–1983	Norway	64	(49)

She played 64 matches and scored 49 goals for the Norwegian national team between 1980 and 1983. She participated at the 1982 World Women's Handball Championship, where the Norwegian team placed seventh. She currently coaches a girls handball team.
