= Lars J. Bjertnæs =

Norwegian physician and professor

Lars Jakob Bjertnæs
- Born: 1941 (age 84–85)
- Scientific career
- Fields: Emergency medicine, anesthesiology
- Institutions: University of Oslo, University of Tromsø

Lars Jakob Bjertnæs (born 1941) is a Norwegian physician and professor emeritus of emergency medicine and anesthesiology at the University of Tromsø. He was appointed by the King-in-Council as professor (chair) of medicine at the university in 1983, has been head of emergency medicine and anesthesiology at the University Hospital of North Norway and central in the research field in Norway since the 1980s.

== Career ==
Bjertnæs graduated as a medical doctor in Germany in 1966 and earned his research doctorate at the University of Oslo in 1980. He became a docent (reader) at the University of Tromsø in 1980 and was appointed as a professor of medicine at the same university by the King-in-Council in 1983. He was also head of emergency medicine and anesthesiology at the University Hospital of North Norway. He has been described as one of the well-known professors of medicine in northern Norway. He was a visiting researcher at the Center for Lung Research at Vanderbilt University (1993–1994) and the Investigational Intensive Care Unit at the University of Texas (1998–1999). He has been active in research on respiratory and cardiovascular physiology, extracorporeal membrane oxygenation, endotoxin-induced lung injury research and several other fields.

He was awarded the Order of the Archangel Michael for his efforts in the development of good Norwegian-Russian medical cooperation in anesthesia and intensive care medicine in 2007.
