= Acta Anaesthesiologica Scandinavica =

- Discipline: Anesthesiology
- Language: English
- Edited by: Michael Haney

Publication details
- History: 1957–present
- Publisher: Wiley-Blackwell
- Frequency: 10/year
- Open access: Hybrid
- Impact factor: 2.105 (2020)

Standard abbreviations
- ISO 4: Acta Anaesthesiol. Scand.

Indexing
- CODEN: AANEAB
- ISSN: 0001-5172 (print); 1399-6576 (web)
- OCLC no.: 604547799

Links
- Journal homepage; Online access

Acta Anaesthesiologica Scandinavica is a peer-reviewed medical journal covering research in the field of anaesthesia, intensive care, pain, and emergency medicine. The editor-in-chief is Michael Haney (Umeå University).

Journal was established in 1957 and is the official publication of the Scandinavian Society of Anaesthesiology and Intensive Care Medicine. According to the Journal Citation Reports, the journal has a 2020 impact factor of 2.105, ranking it 26th out of 33 journals in the category "Anesthesiology".
