= Tom Stiris =

Norwegian pediatrician (born 1954)

Tom Arne Stiris (born 10 March 1954 in Oslo) is a Norwegian pediatrician. He is Professor of Pediatrics at the University of Oslo and has been President of the European Academy of Paediatrics since 2013. He was also President of the European Society for Pediatric Research 2004–2008, a board member of the International Pediatric Research Foundation 2008–2012 and Vice President of the European Academy of Paediatrics 2011–2013. Stiris has been a senior consultant pediatrician at the Department of Neonatal Intensive Care at Oslo University Hospital, Ullevål since 1994, became Medical Director in 2014 and Professor of Pediatrics at the University of Oslo in 2018. He qualified as a doctor in Dublin in 1979 and earned a research doctorate in medicine at the University of Oslo in 1992. He was a professor at the Autonomous University of Madrid from 1991. Stiris is a son of the physician Gabriel Philip Stiris and Gertrud Schwarzman, and is of Litvak descent.
