= Neonatology (journal) =

- Discipline: Neonatology
- Language: English
- Edited by: H. L. Halliday, C. P. Speer

Publication details
- Former names: Biologia Neonatorum; Biology of the Neonate
- History: 1959–present
- Publisher: Karger Publishers
- Frequency: 8/year
- Impact factor: 2.6 (2023)

Standard abbreviations
- ISO 4: Neonatology

Indexing
- CODEN: 34MCAZ
- ISSN: 1661-7800
- OCLC no.: 76838237

Links
- Journal homepage

Neonatology (formerly Biology of the Neonate) is a peer-reviewed medical journal covering the fields of fetal and neonatal research and is published by Karger Publishers. It was established in 1959 as Biologia Neonatorum and renamed to Biology of the Neonate in 1970, obtaining its current name in 2006. Developmental Pharmacology and Therapeutic was incorporated into the Biology of the Neonate in 1996. Its editors-in-chief are H. L. Halliday (Queen's University Belfast) and C. P. Speer (University of Würzburg). Its former editors are A. Minkowski (1959–1985) and J.-P. Relier (1986–2003). According to the Journal Citation Reports, the journal has a 2020 impact factor of 4.035.
