= Board for Licensing Matters and Foreign Medical Practitioners =

The Board for Licensing Matters and Foreign Medical Practitioners (Norwegian: Utvalget for lisenssaker og utenlandsmedisinere) was a public body in Norway, formed in the 1960s and tasked with matters relating to recognition of medical education from outside Norway and licensing of foreign medical practitioners. As a result of the EEA Agreement, its scope was narrowed to matters relating to medical practitioners from outside the European Economic Area in the 1990s, thus excluding most of western Europe and the new EU members from 2004. The body was dissolved in December 2007 and its responsibilities transferred to the Norwegian Board of Health Supervision. The board was appointed by the University of Oslo, which had been delegated the responsibility for foreign medical practitioners.
