= Monroe Community Hospital =

Local 566-bed hospital

Coordinates: 43°6′47″N 77°37′5″W

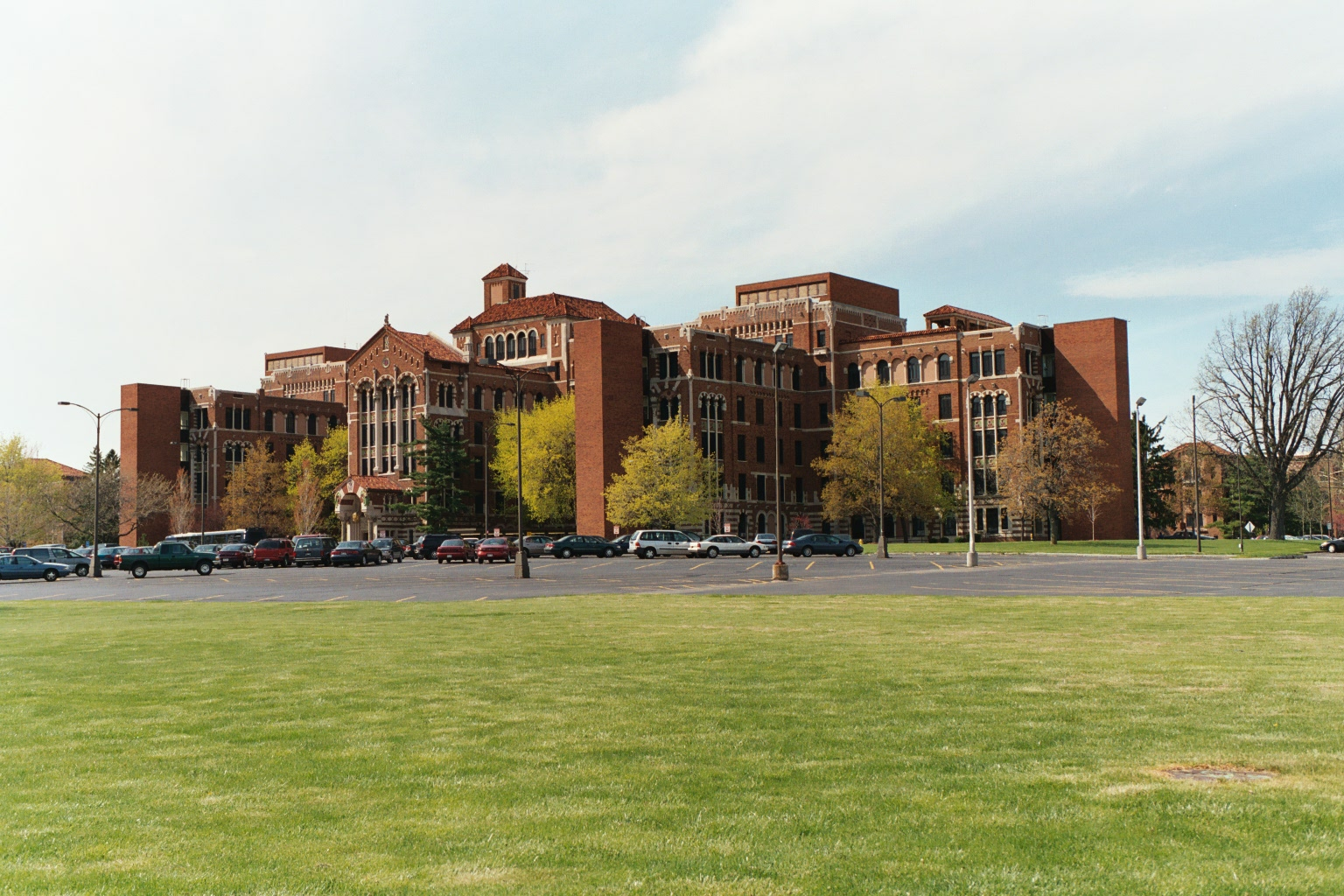
- Monroe County Community Hospital at the East Henrietta Road, designed by the Rochester architect Siegmund Firestone (2002)

Geography
- Location: Rochester, New York, United States

Services
- Beds: 566

History
- Opened: 1933

Links
- Lists: Hospitals in New York State

Monroe Community Hospital is a chronic-care center in Rochester that is operated by Monroe County. They also have a Skilled Nursing Facility

== History ==
The nonprofit 566-bed hospital's roots can be traced to the 1933-built Monroe Community Home and Infirmary, which was a replacement for the 1820s-built Monroe County Almshouse. The Community Home structure "was designed by local architect Sigmund Firestone." Firestone employed Thomas Wilson Boyde Jr. (1905-1981), who later became "Rochester's first Black architect." Boyde's "decorative architectural elements added to" Firestone's design.

Some of the 190-year-old facility's attending physicians are "affiliated with the University of Rochester's Strong Memorial Hospital."

== Controversy ==
In 2017 a local newspaper headlined "Two lawsuits in a month against Monroe Community Hospital." They had publicly fired their director in 2013.
