= Flight Attendant Medical Research Institute =

American research-funding body

FAMRI, or the Flight Attendant Medical Research Institute is a non-profit research funding body. It was created as part of the settlement of a class action lawsuit brought against the tobacco industry on behalf of non-smoking flight attendants.

FAMRI funds research into smoking-related and secondhand smoke related cancers. This is primarily through grants to principal investigators and American universities but also through the Julius B. Richmond Center of Excellence at the American Academy of Pediatrics and the FAMRI Center of Excellence at Johns Hopkins.

Norma Broin was the lead plaintiff in the class action case, Broin v. Philip Morris.
