= Clinical Teacher =

American medical journal

- Language: English

Publication details
- Publisher: John Wiley & Sons

Standard abbreviations
- ISO 4: Clin. Teach.

Indexing
- ISSN: 1743-4971 (print); 1743-498X (web)

Links
- Journal homepage

The Clinical Teacher is a medical journal published by John Wiley & Sons. Established in 2004, the journal focuses on clinical education in the health professions. It is abstracted and indexed in Medline and Scopus, and the editor-in-chief is Aileen Barrett. The journal was established in 2004.

== Editorial board ==
Editor in Chief

- Aileen Barrett, Waterford, Ireland

Editorial Office

- Susmitha Raghubabu, Senior Associate Editor, Oxford

Senior Associate Editor

- Sharon Buckley, Birmingham, UK

Associate Editors

- Madawa Chandratilake, Veyangoda, Sri Lanka
- Richard Conn, Belfast, UK
- Gail Jensen, Omaha, USA
- Jennifer Weller-Newton, Melbourne, Australia

Associate Editor, Social Media

- Simon Fleming, London

Production Editor

- Sheryl Acorda, Manila

Editorial Advisory Group

- Monica Moran, Perth, Australia
- Angela Towle, Vancouver, Canada
- Jamie Read, Plymouth, UK
- Vishna Nadarajah, Kuala Lumpur, Malaysia
- Lawrence Tan, Sydney, Australia
- Yvonne Botma, Bloemfontein, South Africa
- Andy Whallett, Dudley, UK

Sub-Editors, Visual Abstracts

- Aqua Asif, Leicester
- Oliver Burton, Newcastle upon Tyne
