= Thrombosis Research =

Cardiology journal

- Discipline: Cardiology
- Language: English
- Edited by: Shannon Bates, Henri Versteeg

Publication details
- History: 1972–present
- Publisher: Elsevier
- Frequency: Monthly
- Open access: Hybrid

Standard abbreviations
- ISO 4: Thromb. Res.

Indexing
- CODEN: THBRAA
- ISSN: 0049-3848 (print); 1879-2472 (web)
- OCLC no.: 00985997

Links
- Journal homepage; @Elsevier

Thrombosis Research is an international peer-reviewed medical journal published by Elsevier with a goal of rapid dissemination of new information on thrombosis, hemostasis, and vascular biology to advance science and clinical care. The journal publishes peer-reviewed original research, along with reviews, editorials, and opinions and critics. Both basic and clinical studies are published. Publication of research which will lead to novel approaches in diagnosis, therapy, prognosis and prevention of thrombotic and hemorrhagic diseases is given high priority.

Its impact factor as of 2025 is 3.4, and its Citescore is 5.8. It has an average review time to first decision of 35 days and an average publication time, from the moment of submission, of 79 days. The journal was established in 1972 by A.L. Copley.

Editors: S.M. Bates, H.H. Versteeg

Senior Editor: F.A. Klok

Associate Editors: C. Bagot, S. Barco, B. Bikdeli, S. Gando, Y. Hisada, M. Lordkipanidzé, M. Lim, H. Schulze, E. Stavrou, V. Tagalakis, G. Young.
