= Specialty committees (Norway) =

The Specialty Committees of the Norwegian Medical Association are advisory committees on matters of specialist education and training as well as continuing medical education and professional development. They are appointed by the professional board of the Association and work closely with the different educational departments of the Association's administration and issue statements and recommendations through this administration. The Specialty Committees are regulated by the bylaws of the Norwegian Medical Association, § 3-10-1 Lover for Den norske legeforening (legeforeningen.no): within each of the approved medical specialties there shall be a Specialty Committee acting as an expert- and advisory body for the Association's professional board in matters concerning specialist education and training as well as continuing medical education and professional development.

There are 46 Specialty Committees that each consists of five members and three alternate members. At least one member must be employed at a university-affiliated clinic, preferably in an academic position. One member and an alternate member must be a physician under training in the given specialty. All members must be active practitioners within their specialty. Each member is appointed for a period of 4 years.

The Norwegian Medical Association, through its Specialty Committees, have a statutory role as a professional advisor to the Directorate of Health on matters concerning specialist education and certification. Statements and recommendations given through this role will be in the public domain and are subject to the right of access in accordance with the Public Administration Act and the Public Access to Information Act.
