= Norwegian Junior Doctors Association =

Logo.

The Norwegian Junior Doctors Association (Norwegian: Yngre legers forening) is a vocational organisation in Norway.

It organizes younger physicians, and is a body of the Norwegian Medical Association. It was founded on 5 November 1911.
